= Stortyskarna =

Swedish steam locomotives

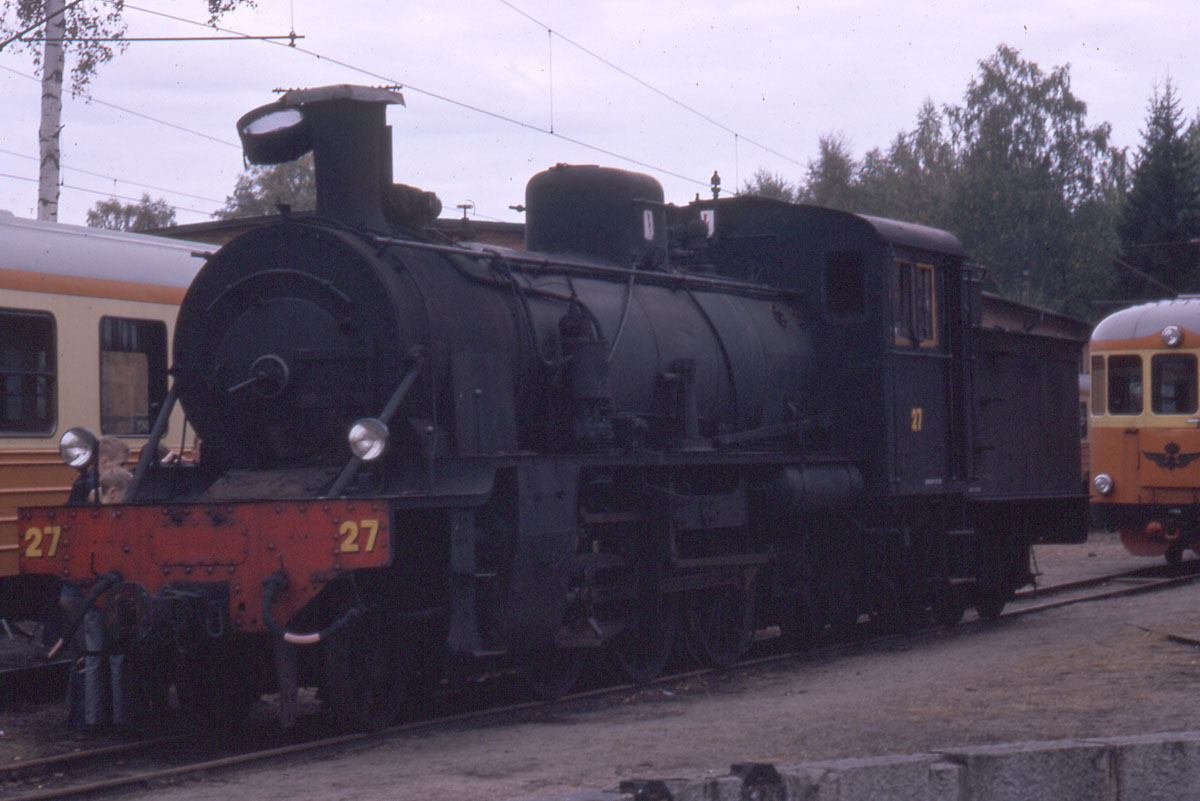
- SRJ 27 in Rimbo in 1962.
Type and origin
- Power type: Steam
- Builder: Henschel & Son
- Build date: 1920
Specifications
- Configuration
  - Whyte: 2-6-2
  - UIC: 1′C1' h2
- Gauge: 891 mm (2 ft 11 3/32 in) Swedish three foot
- Leading dia.: 800 mm (2 ft 7 in)
- Driver dia.: 1,300 mm (4 ft 3 in)
- Trailing dia.: 800 mm (2 ft 7 in)
- Loco weight: 40.75 tonnes (40.11 long tons; 44.92 short tons)
- Total weight: 65.25 tonnes (64.22 long tons; 71.93 short tons)
- Fuel type: Coal
- Fuel capacity: 3 tonnes (3.0 long tons; 3.3 short tons)
- Water cap.: 10 m^{3} (2,200 imp gal; 2,600 US gal)
- Cylinders: Two
Performance figures
- Maximum speed: 69 km/h (43 mph)
Career
- Operators: Stockholm–Roslagens Järnvägar
- Number in class: 3

The passenger train locomotives number 27–29 of Stockholm–Roslagens Järnvägar, usually referred to as stortyskarna (literally "the Great Germans"), were the largest steam locomotives ever built for the Swedish three foot gauge railways. Initially used in fast passenger trains from Stockholm to Rimbo and Hallstavik, they were moved to freight service after the Stockholm–Rimbo Line was electrified in 1946. They hauled iron ore from Dannemora mine and transporter wagons from Uppsala, but were replaced by diesel locomotives during the 1950s. Two locomotives were leased at different times to the narrow-gauge network in Västergötland. Their last service was between Rimbo and Hallstavik in 1960. SRJ 28 has been preserved.

== History ==
Number 27–29, delivered in 1920 from Henschel & Son in Kassel, Germany, were the last steam locomotives ordered by SRJ. Prices were low in Germany at the time, and several Swedish railways bought locomotives from Henschel and other German manufacturers. The 2-6-2 locomotives had superheaters, relatively large bogie tenders, and were initially equipped with feedwater heaters, but the latter were removed as being too difficult to maintain. They were the largest and heaviest steam locomotives ever built for the 891 mm gauge. Intended for fast passenger trains, they were capable of considerably higher speeds than the official 69-kilometre-per-hour (43 mph) limit, but the railway itself only allowed 60 km/h (37 mph).

The locomotives were mostly used on from Stockholm to Rimbo and Hallstavik, occasionally from Rimbo to Norrtälje, although tank locomotives dominated on the latter line due to the turntable being too short for tender locomotives. The trains between Stockholm and Rimbo sometimes had fourteen carriages, including direct carriages to Norrtälje and Hallstavik. Express trains were introduced in June 1928, running the 57 km between Rimbo and Stockholm in one hour and five minutes. The purchase of the locomotives was partly due to an expected increase in traffic after Faringe–Gimo Järnväg was opened, but they were hardly ever used on that railway before the Second World War, except in the very first train.

SRJ already operated electric local trains near Stockholm, and wartime difficulties with obtaining coal made them extend the electrification, reaching Rimbo in 1946 and Norrtälje in 1949. The need for large passenger train locomotives was now drastically reduced. SRJ considered rebuilding number 27–29 to 2-6-4 tank locomotives, and NOHAB offered to do so at a cost of 34,500 Swedish crowns for one locomotive or 89,400 crowns for all three, but it was never done. Instead they were moved to freight service between Rimbo and Hallstavik and iron ore trains between Dannemora and Hargshamn. They were still used in some passenger trains, including a Sunday evening train from Gimo to Rimbo that sometimes had ten bogie carriages.

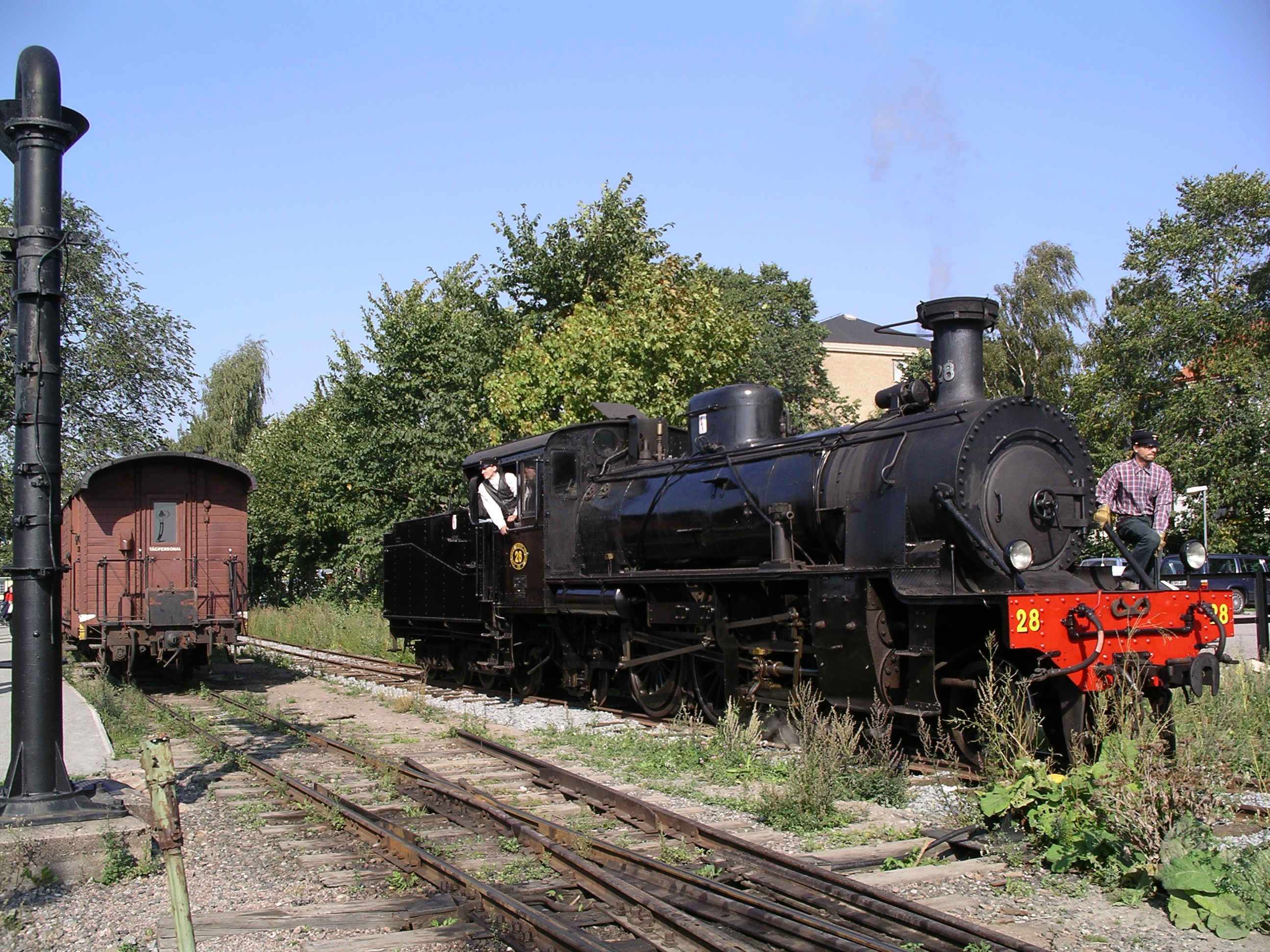
SRJ 28 in Uppsala in 2004.

At this time Västergötland–Göteborgs Järnvägar (VGJ) were in need of more locomotives on its large network in Västergötland. SRJ 28 was leased to VGJ in 1947–1948; after returning to SRJ it was overhauled and equipped with roller bearings in the tender bogies. SRJ 27 was leased to the Swedish State Railways (SJ) in 1952–1955 for use on the now nationalized VGJ network. While in Västergötland it received a six-wheeled tender from an SJ locomotive, B2p number 3105, and this tender was also used on SRJ until number 27 was scrapped in 1962.

Transporter wagons were introduced in freight trains from Uppsala to Norrtälje and Hallstavik in 1955, enabling direct transports to the normal-gauge network. This caused a large increase in freight traffic via Uppsala, and SRJ 27–29 were generally used in these trains. Smaller steam locomotives hauling trains with transporter wagons were prone to get stuck at a gradient near Faringe. Diesel locomotives were however introduced during the 1950s, and steam locomotives were hardly ever seen on the Uppsala–Rimbo line after 1958, but SRJ 28 was used on the line to Hallstavik until the autumn of 1960. That locomotive was then preserved in Faringe before being transferred to the Swedish Railway Museum in 1970. It was returned to Faringe in 1987 on loan to the heritage railway Upsala-Lenna Jernväg. The other two locomotives were scrapped in 1962.

== Preservation ==
SRJ 28 Is being restored at Upsala-Lenna Jernväg, although the date when it will be finished is not clear, It has been delayed by at least 2 years so far. As SRJ 27 and SRJ 29 were both scrapped.
