= Upsala–Lenna Jernväg =

Railway in Sweden

Coordinates: 59°51′30″N 17°38′55″E

Upsala–Lenna Järnväg (ULJ) (lit. 'Upsala–Lenna Railway'), also nicknamed "Lennakatten", is a narrow-gauge heritage railway in Uppsala County, Sweden. It is 33 km (21 mi) long and is a part of the once extensive Roslagen narrow-gauge network. The gauge is the 891 mm (2 ft 11 3/32 in), unique to Sweden. The railway is run by the society SRJmf.

== History ==
The railway between Uppsala and Lenna (old spelling of Länna) was opened in 1876 and was the first of all 891 mm (2 ft 11 3/32 in) railways in the region. It was built to serve the ironworks at Länna with a connection to the 1,435 mm (4 ft 8 1/2 in) standard gauge railroad network. The choice of gauge was somewhat of a compromise, 600 mm (1 ft 11 5/8 in) would have sufficed for the ore and steel traffic but with only a slight increase in budget allowed the greater capacity to carry passengers, mail and other goods. Two years later the Dannemora–Harg railroad (DHJ), also 891 mm, started to operate in the north of the county. That railway was built to connect the mines in Dannemora with the harbour at Hargshamn. In 1884, ULJ was linked with the coast by the Lenna–Norrtelje Railroad (LNJ). The following year that line was connected through Rimbo with Stockholm by the Stockholm–Rimbo Railroad (SRJ).

SRJ acquired LNJ in 1905 and ULJ in 1908. In 1909, the company's name was changed to Stockholm–Roslagens Järnvägar (Stockholm–Roslagen Railroad), which enabled it to keep its signature (SRJ); Roslagen is the historical name of the coastal district north of Stockholm. SRJ was also involved in the building of a new line northwards from Rimbo which was finished in Hallstavik in 1915. In 1920, DHJ (by then a subsidiary of SRJ) was connected with the rest of the system by the Faringe–Gimo line.

As of 1895, the line from Stockholm (including branch lines) were electrified. This project was finished in 1949 when Rimbo–Norrtälje was electrified. After World War II, most railways started to decline. SRJ/DHJ was nationalised in 1951, and eight years later the network was absorbed into the Swedish State Railways (SJ). During the early 1950s, all three freight-only branch lines to DHJ (to Lövstabruk, Ramhäll and Fagervik by Lake Vällen) were closed. In 1960, passenger traffic ceased on the Dannemora–Harg and Faringe–Gimo lines as well as all the traffic from Stockholms östra railway station to Engelbrektsplan in the centre of Stockholm. The latter was a city line with regular tram tracks, and for this reason freight trains never ran there, and steam engines only rarely. Six years later, in 1966, the commuter line Stocksund–Långängstorp was closed. That line was initially built with standard gauge, but was converted in 1934 to narrow-gauge, 891 mm, for practical reasons. In 1966, passenger traffic closed on the line Uppsala–Rimbo–Hallstavik, and in 1969, only twenty years after its electrification, the line Rimbo–Norrtälje was closed. The same year, freight traffic closed south of Rimbo.

However, freight traffic was still quite busy on some parts of the network. The Dannemora mines still exported iron ore through the harbour at Hargshamn, and freight trains with transporter wagons took freight to and from the paper mill at Hallstavik via Uppsala–Rimbo. For this reason, the national railway board decided to convert the former DHJ into standard gauge. The conversion was completed in 1970. At the same time, all traffic was closed on the line Faringe–Gimo. A newly built standard gauge extension was built from Hargshamn to Hallstavik in 1977 and the transporter-waggon traffic Hallstavik–Rimbo–Uppsala ceased.

In 1972, the Storstockholms Lokaltrafik (SL) took over the remaining lines with passenger traffic, i.e. the lines south of Rimbo, which now was effectively disconnected from the northern network including present-day Upsala–Lenna Järnväg. SL closed the branch line Djursholms Ösby–Eddavägen in 1976, and in 1981, the former railroad junction at Rimbo lost all its railways when the Kårsta–Rimbo line was closed, making the village of Kårsta with some 200 inhabitants the new northern terminus. What is still used nowadays goes under the name Roslagsbanan and is now an essential part of Stockholm commuter traffic.

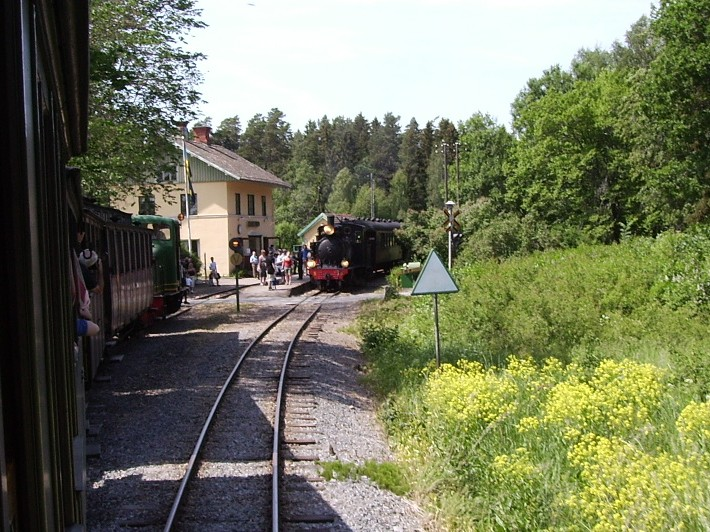
Marielund railway station in 2006.

Almunge station (video) 2015.

== SRJmf ==
The society SRJmf was formed in 1968 with the main purpose of saving rolling stock from the SRJ/DHJ network for excursion traffic. Initially, the society was based in Stockholm and ran excursions on different parts of the network. As the SJ started to close parts of the network discussions about converting various parts to heritage railway was discussed. Finsta–Syninge on the Rimbo–Norrtälje branch, closed in 1967, was a strong candidate as was Faringe–Gimo. As SJ in the early 1970s started to construct the new standard gauge line from Hargshamn to Hallstavik, the society realized that the Uppsala–Rimbo–Hallstavik line would no longer be used for freight traffic, providing the society the opportunity to start traffic on the scenic line close to Uppsala.

With the aid of the Municipality of Uppsala, traffic started on Sundays in the summer of 1974 when freight trains did not run. Three years later the Hargshamn–Hallstavik line was opened and all traffic ceased on the Uppsala–Rimbo–Hallstavik line. The society could then take over the line Uppsala–Länna–Faringe, with the City of Uppsala as owner of the track and with the former junction Faringe serving as the headquarters with workshop facilities. The tracks between Faringe and Rimbo were removed in 1978.

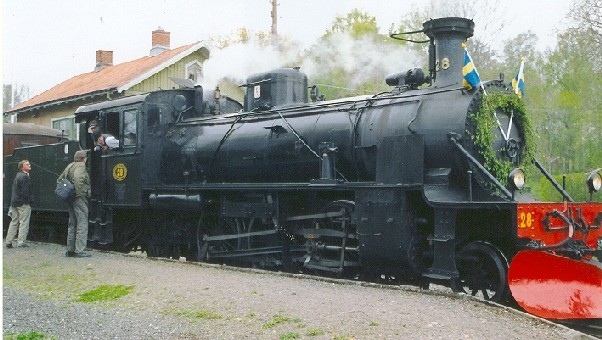
SRJ 28 Stortysken at Lenna Station (in Länna) in June 2005. This is the last of a series of three of the biggest steam locomotives ever built for 891 mm rail gauge.

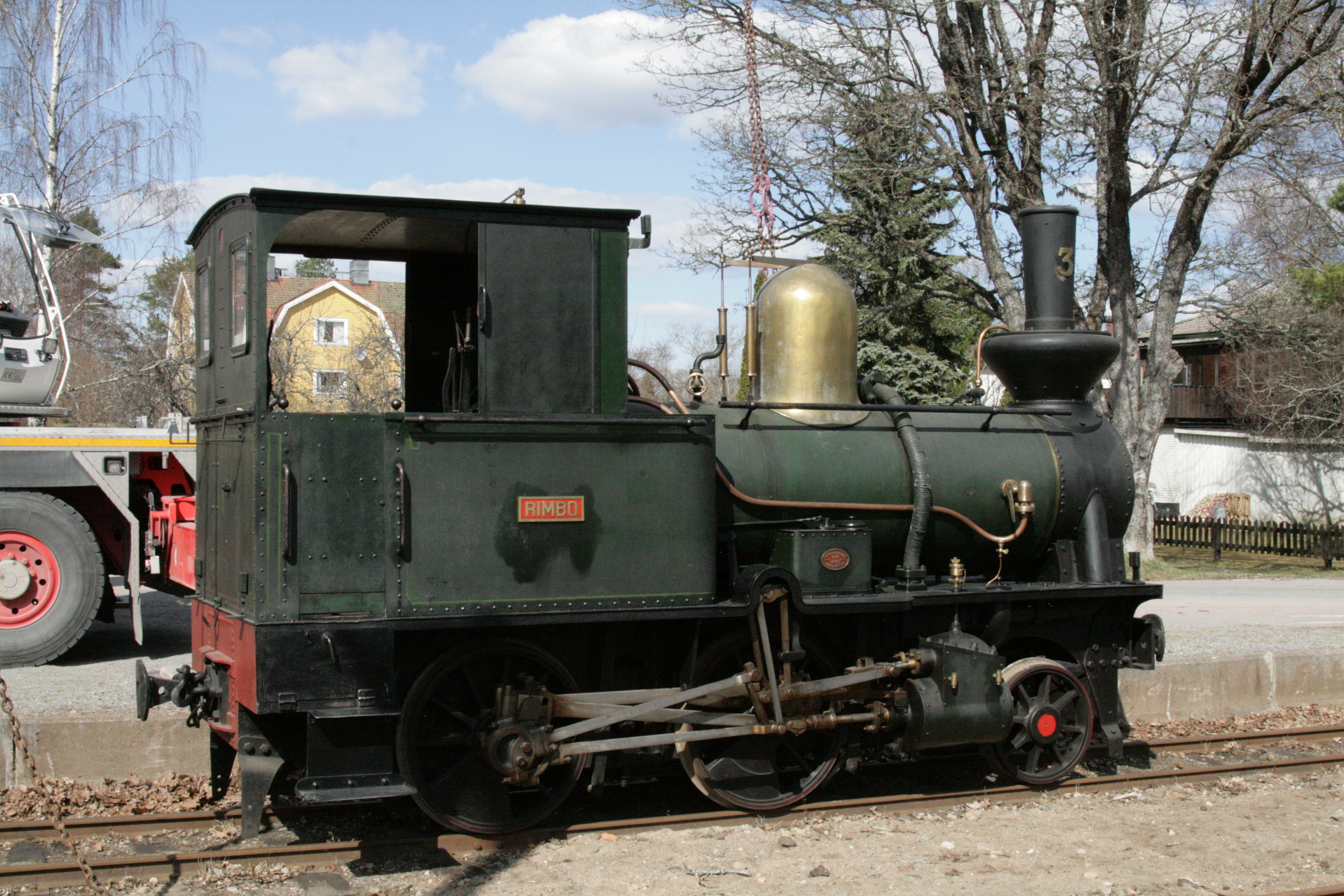
SRJ 3 Rimbo at Faringe. The oldest (1884) extant locomotive from the SRJ.

== Current traffic ==
Presently traffic is run Sundays in June to early September, expanded to four days a week in July; a great number of school excursions and other charters are run in late May and throughout the year.

A typical Sunday sees two steam-hauled trains and one motorcar train, augmented by veteran buses transiting to Fjällnora open air baths.

Weekdays mostly resemble Sundays; one of the steam-hauled trains might be replaced by a diesels. However, there is usually an early extra connection to Faringe and the Thun's outlet store.

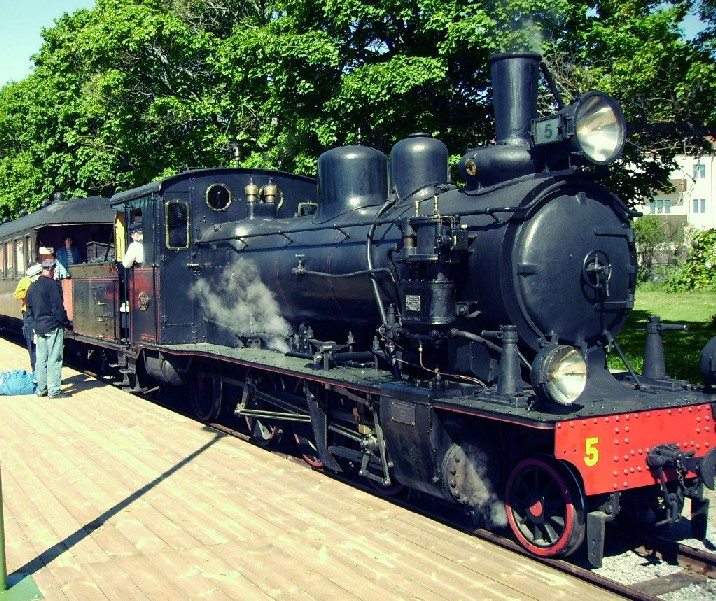
BLJ 5 Thor at Uppsala Ö in June 2006

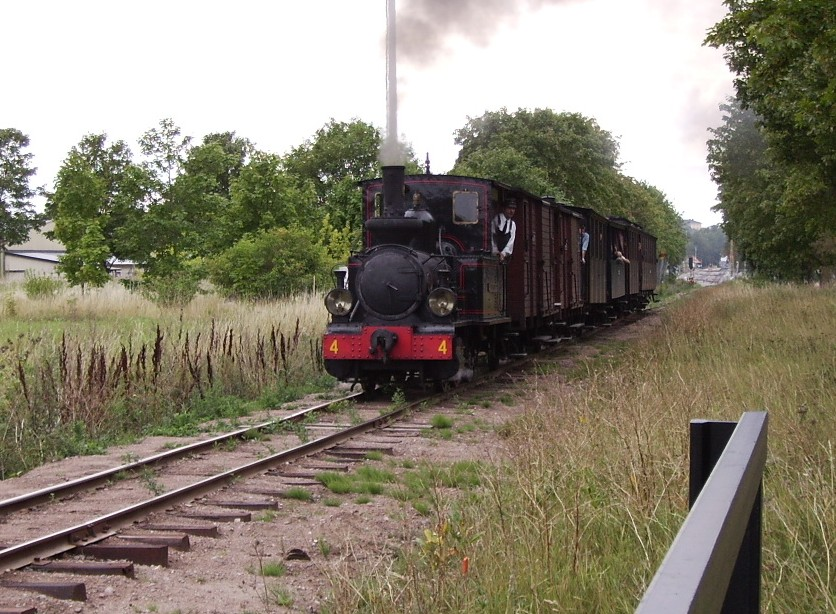
BLJ 4 Långshyttan leaving Uppsala Ö in September 2006

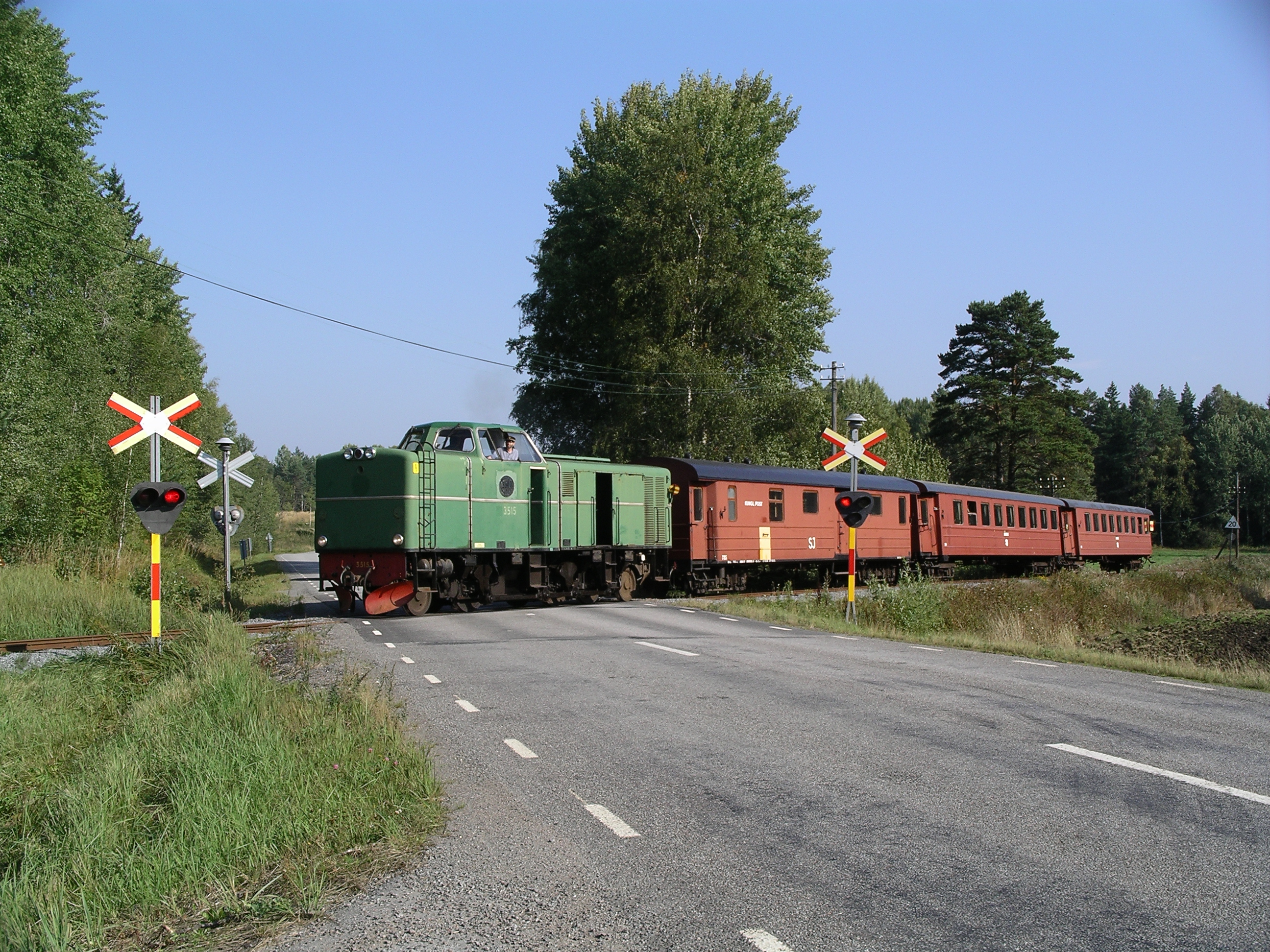
Tp 3515 leaving Faringe

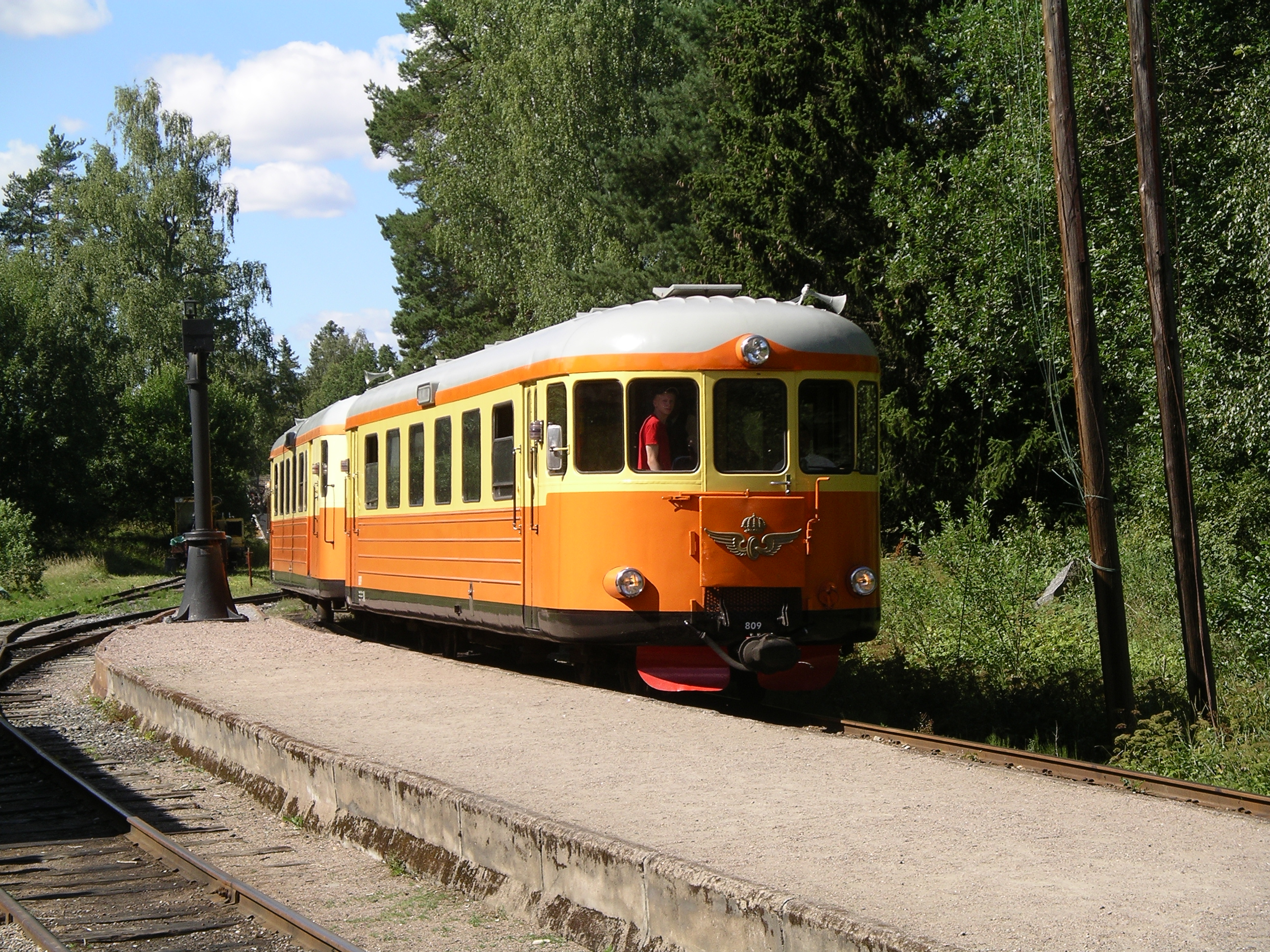
Motorcars arriving at Marielund

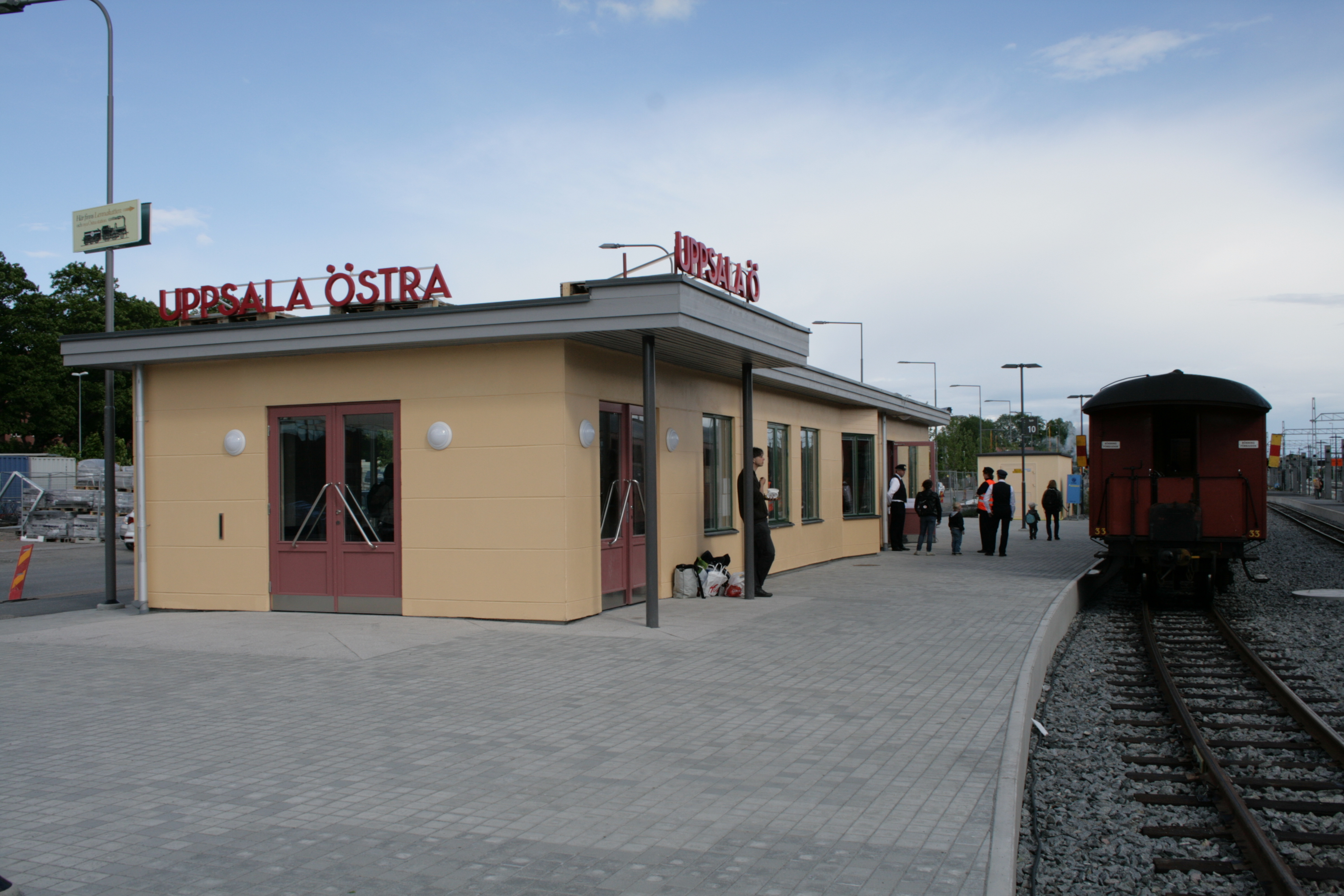
Uppsala station

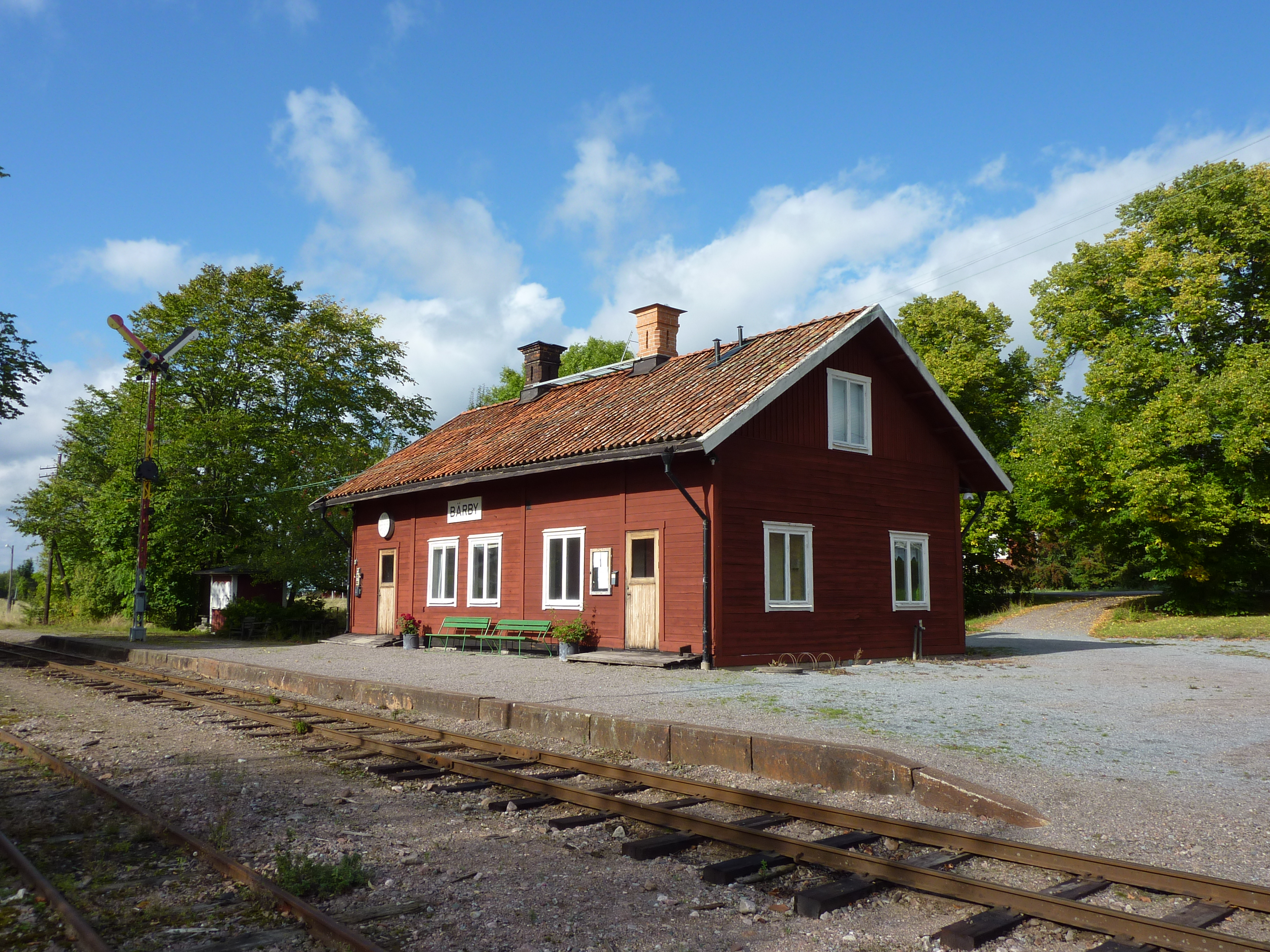
Bärby station

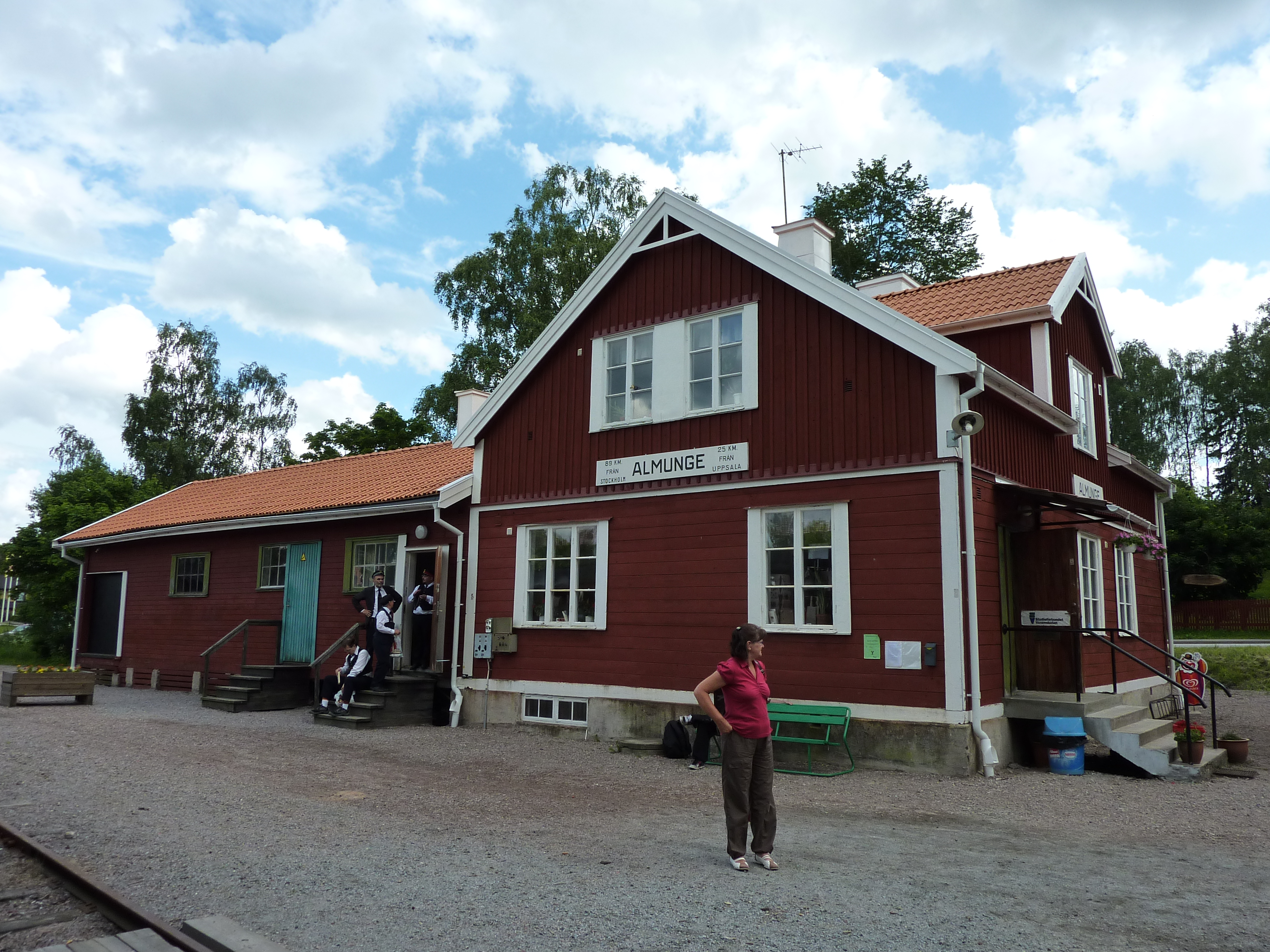
Almunge station

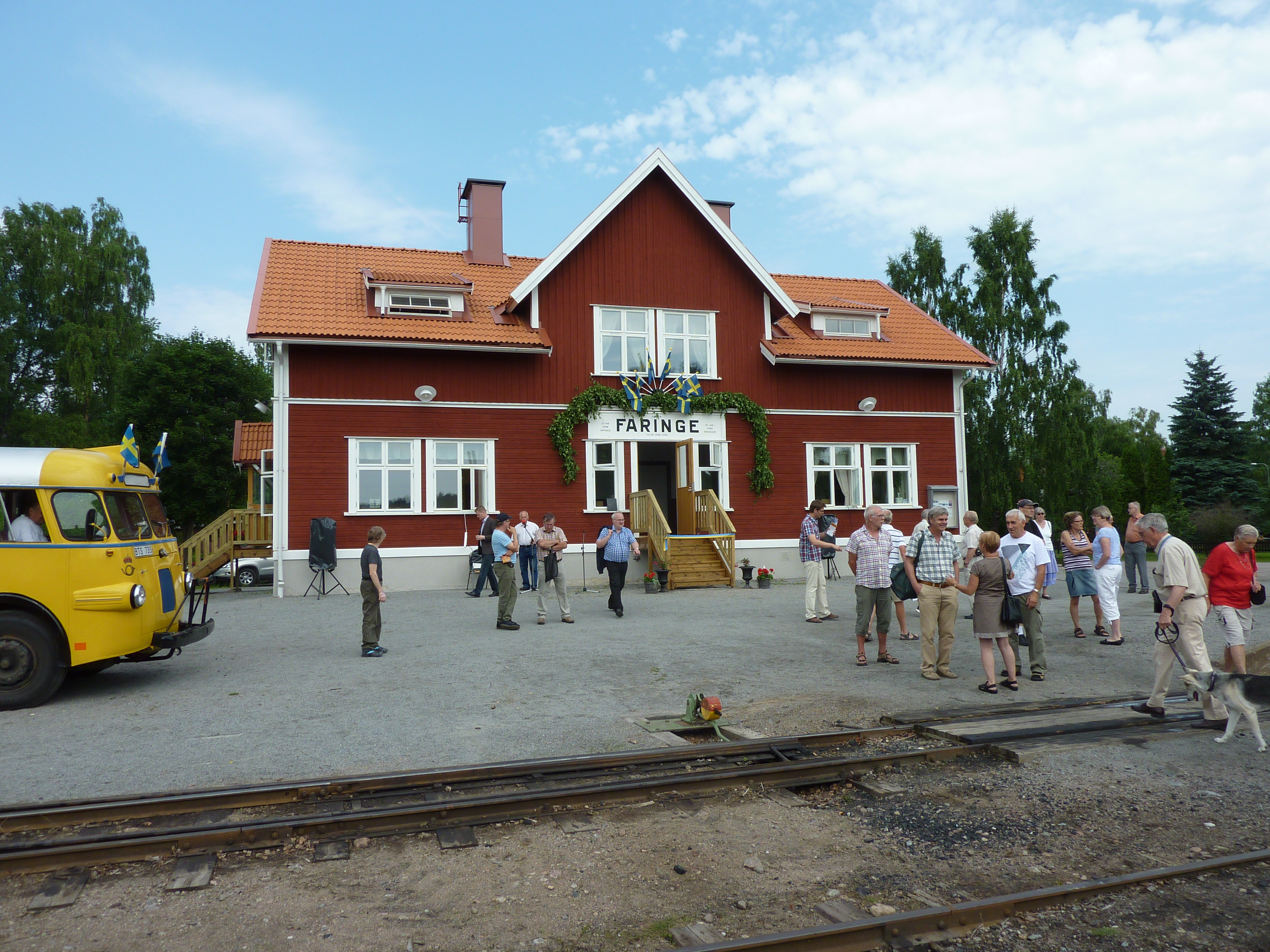
Faringe station

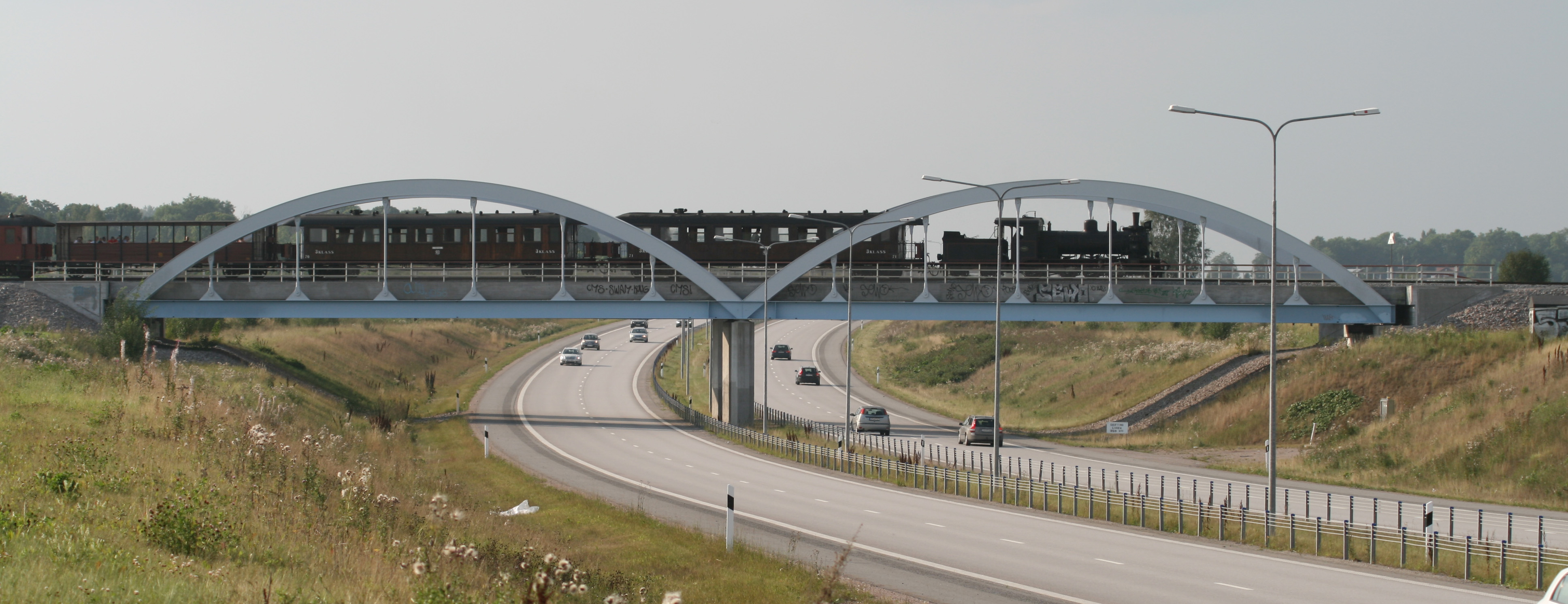
Thor crossing the E4 bridge

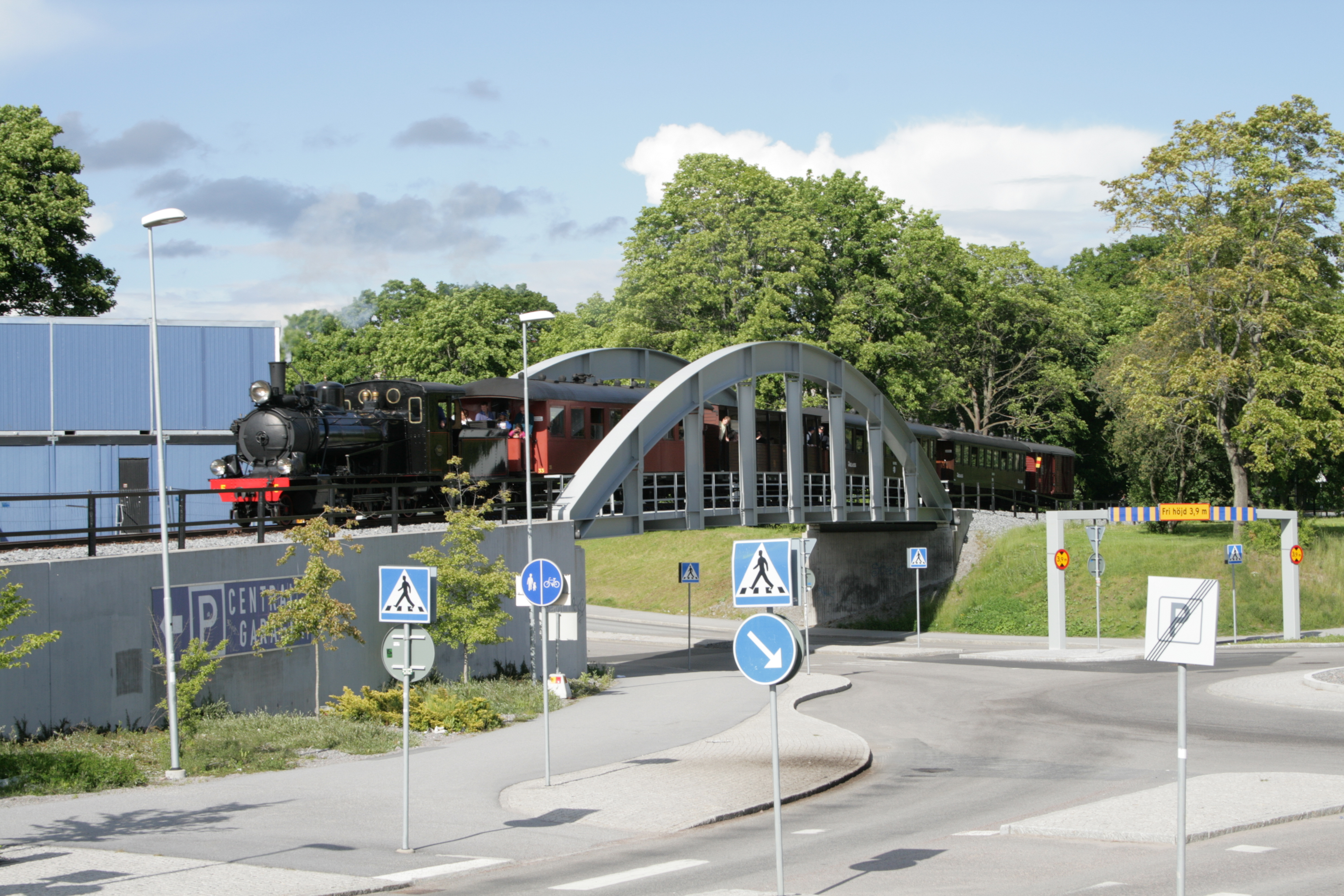
Thor arriving at Uppsala Ö

== See also ==
- List of heritage railways
- Roslagsbanan
