= Stockholm–Roslagens Järnvägar =

Swedish railway company

Stockholm–Roslagens Järnvägar (SRJ) was a private railway company in Sweden 1885–1951, running a vast network of narrow gauge railways in Roslagen north of Stockholm. The company was taken over by Swedish State Railways in 1951, formally combined into Swedish State Railways in 1959.

Parts of the SRJ network closest to Stockholm is now used for commuter traffic and called Roslagsbanan, owned by Storstockholms Lokaltrafik (SL). The line between Hargshamn and Dannemora has been converted to standard gauge and made part of the national, government owned network. Another part close to Uppsala is used as a heritage railway and called Upsala–Lenna Jernväg. All other parts are now closed.

== History ==
The SRJ network became a large narrow gauge system throughout Roslagen and east Uppland through mergers and acquisitions, connecting Stockholm and Uppsala with ports, smaller towns and parts of the countryside and used for both freight and passenger transports.

The first parts of what became the total network were inaugurated in 1876 as the Uppsala–Lenna railway. In 1885 the line from Stockholms östra railway station (Stockholm) to Rimbo opened, what is now the longest part of Roslagsbanan and originally built and run by the private enterprise Stockholm–Rimbo Järnväg (SRJ). These lines were connected, making Rimbo a junction on the first railway connection between Stockholm and Uppsala (the government owned standard gauge mainline straight from Stockholm C to Uppsala C was not inaugurated until some years later). In 1909 SRJ changed its name to Stockholm–Roslagens Järnvägar (with the same abbreviation) following the take-over of companies running adjacent lines, such as the Uppsala–Lenna railway and Djursholmsbanan (DjB). The total SRJ network, all with the same narrow gauge, at its largest covered large parts of Roslagen, hence its name.

Parts of the network made up one of the oldest electrified railway lines for public transport in Europe: the first Stockholm–Djursholm suburban part was electrified in 1892. and this line was at the time drawn further in to the centre of Stockholm on a tram track, ending at Engelbrektsplan next to Humlegården, allowing for just a short walk to the city centre or to inner city tram lines and busses; since 1960 this line now also ends at the Stockholms östra railway station.

In the beginning of the 20th century and well into the 1950s, Djursholms Ösby, a junction station on the network, was one of the busiest railway stations in Sweden with a train stopping every three minutes and three different lines dividing from there, transporting people and goods.

In the years following World War II, more and more of Swedish railways were taken over by the government through Swedish State Railways (SJ), a fate also shared by the SRJ network. In 1969 the Stockholm Landsting took over the southern network (Stockholm–Rimbo, which is what now goes under the name Roslagsbanan) from SJ, since then using it for passenger use only, with the newly formed commuter transport company SL managing the railway. The northern network (Uppsala–Rimbo and Rimbo–Hallstavik) was kept for freight use only by SJ.

When SL took over the southern part of the railway network and renamed it Roslagsbanan, it had many problems, but it has since been modernized. The Djursholm branch (Eddavägslinjen) was closed by SL in 1976. In 1977 the most northern line, Dannemora–Hargshamn which had been already converted into a standard gauge freight line (1970), was extended to Hallstavik by SJ and the remaining northern narrow gauge network was abandoned and dismantled, except for the oldest line, Uppsala–Lenna, which is kept as a heritage railway with tourist traffic in summertime. It has no connection to the commercially run Roslagsbanan anymore.

=== Pictures of formerly used parts ===
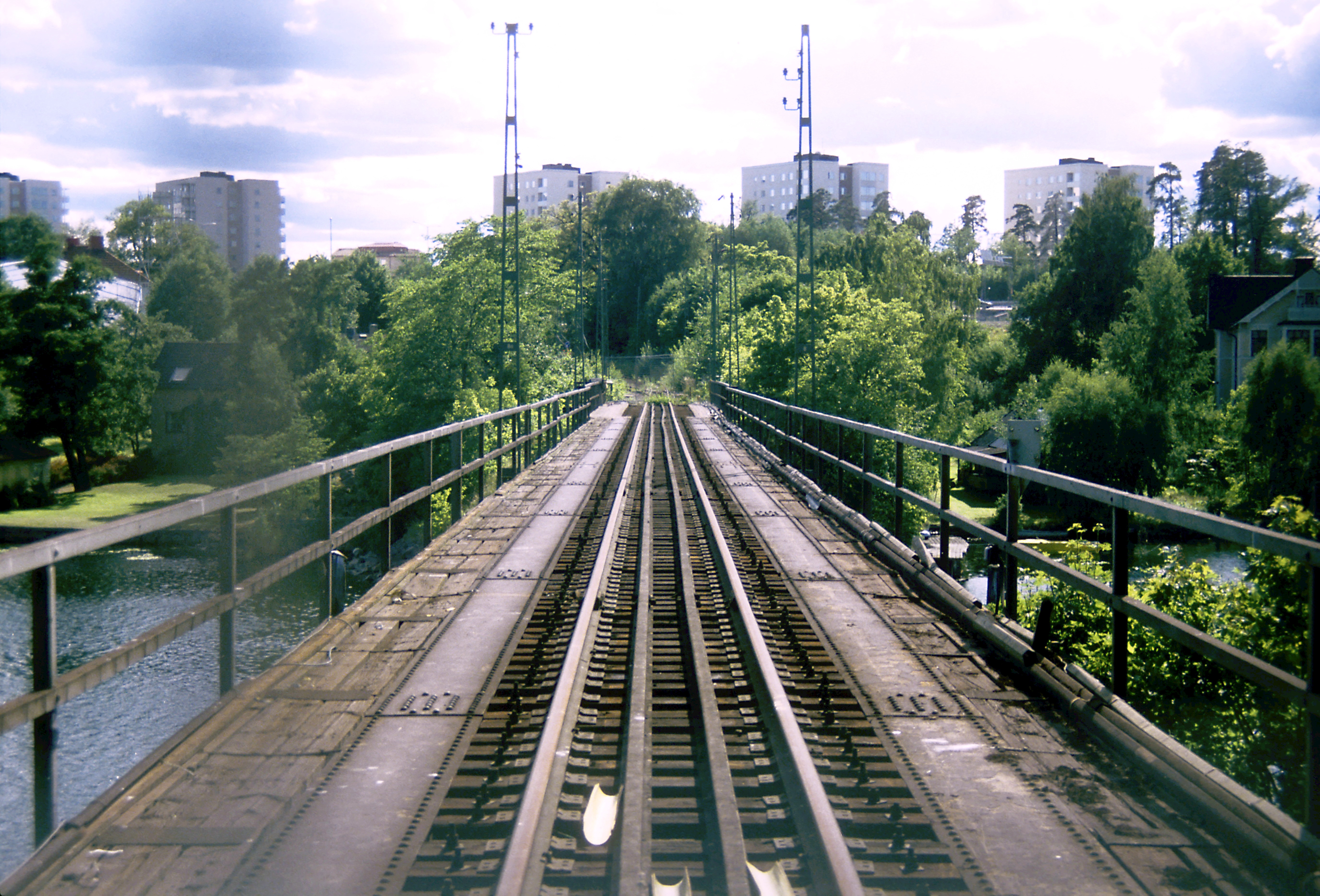
Old bridge of Stocksund, dismantled in 1997

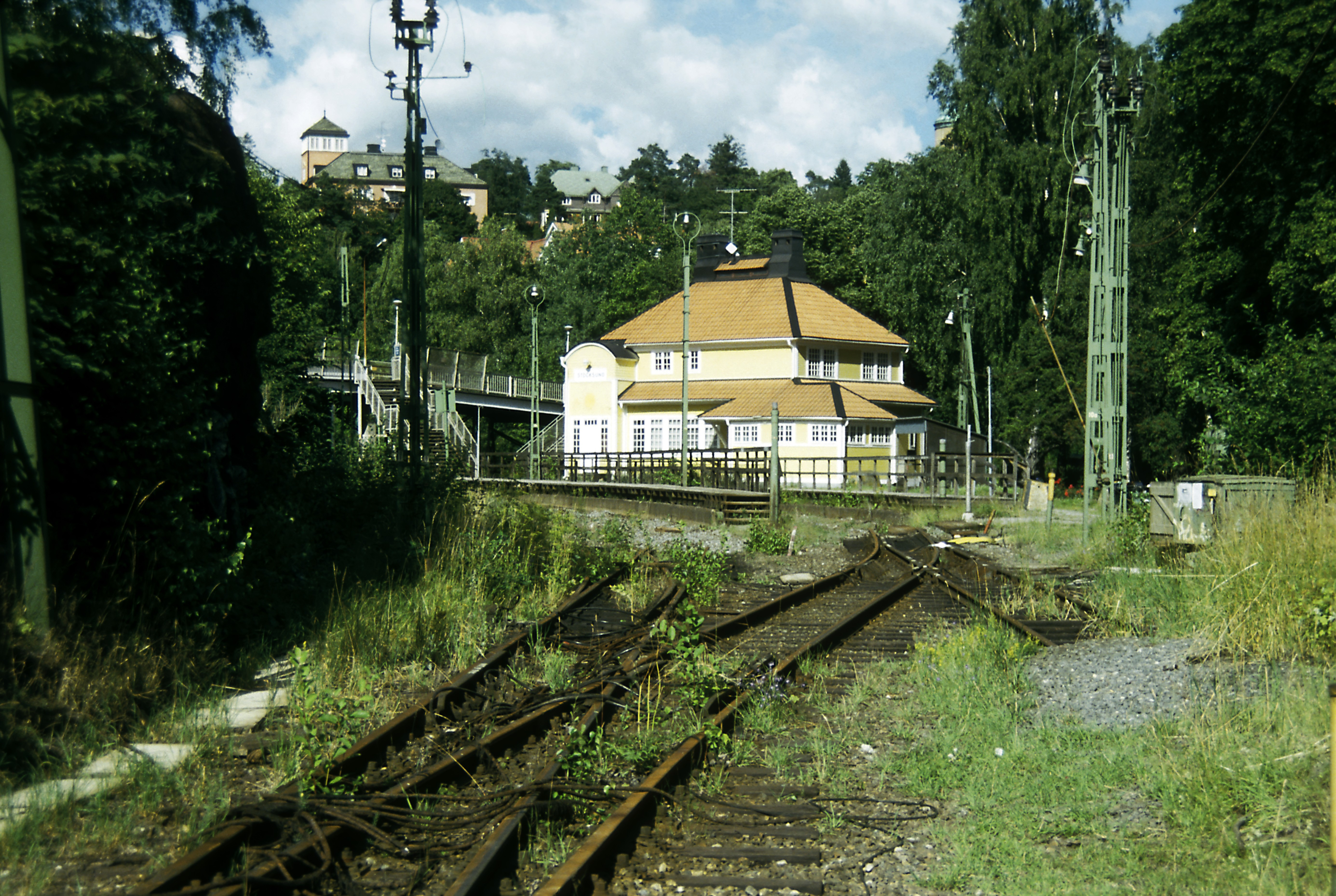
Old station of Stocksund, now replaced with a station some hundred metres to the north-west, where the rails goes straighter allowing for higher speed.

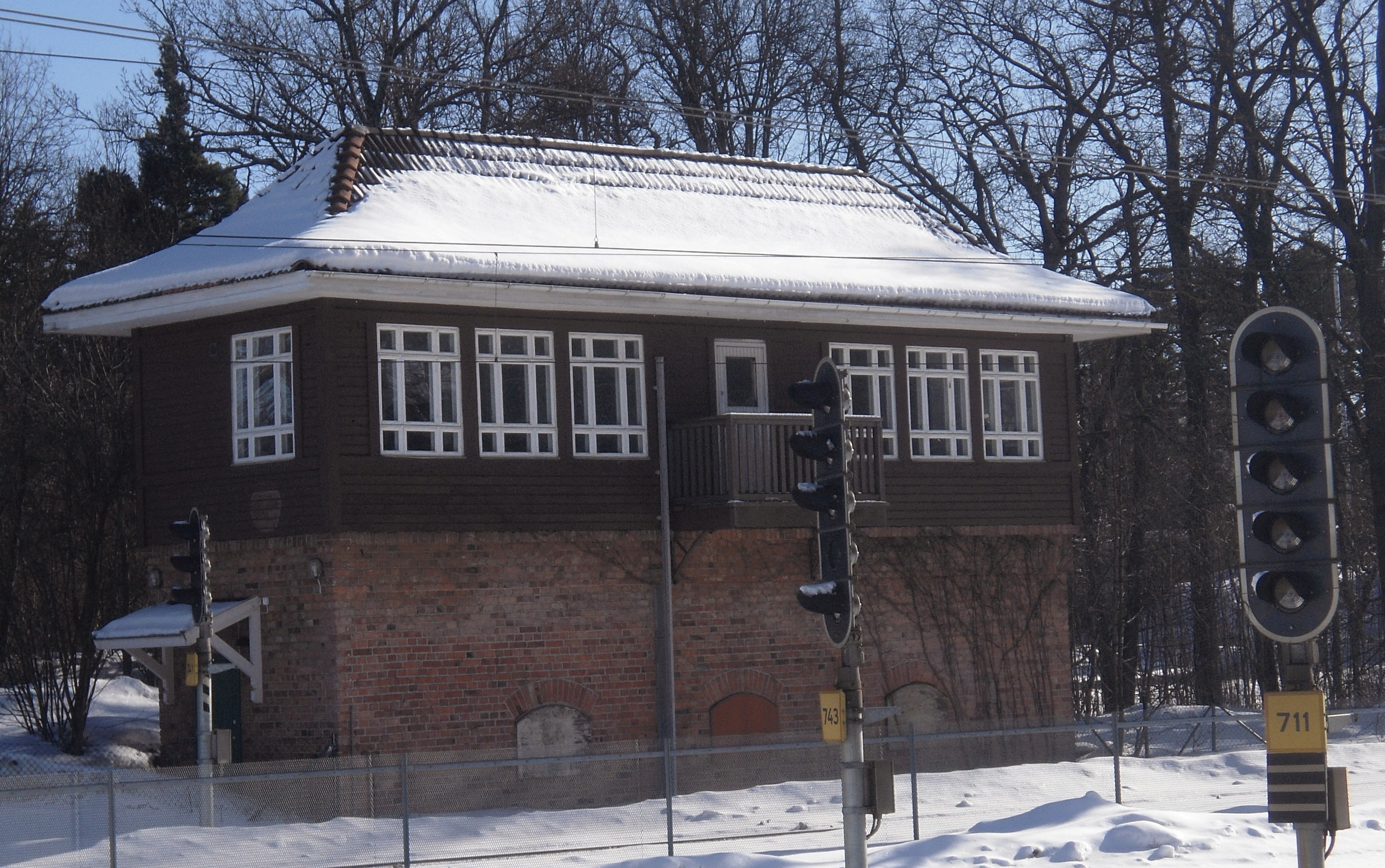
Old signal box at Djursholms Ösby

=== Current networks ===
These were previously connected to each other.

- Roslagsbanan, used as a modern commuter railway for the north-east suburbs of Stockholm
- Uppsala–Länna–Faringe (opened in 1876 to Länna, 1885 to Faringe); Tourist traffic only, see Upsala–Lenna Jernväg
- Dannemora–Gimo–Hargshamn–Hallstavik (Opened 1878; Dannemora–Hargshamn turned to standard gauge in the 1970s and extended in to Hallstavik 1977; SJ/Green Cargo freight only; connected to Upptåget commuter rail at Örbyhus, before Dannemora)

=== Closed parts of the network ===
- Faringe–Gimo (1921–1960)
- Rimbo–Norrtälje (1884–1969)
- Uppsala–Rimbo–Hallstavik (1884–1977)
- Stocksund–Långängen (1915-standard gauge tram) line, then turned to narrow gauge in 1934, closed in 1966)
- Stockholms östra–Engelbrektsplan (1895–1960)
- Djursholms Ösby–Edddavägen (1890–1977)
- Kårsta–Rimbo (1885–1981)
