= SRJ =

SRJ could mean:

- Stockholm–Roslagens Järnvägar, a defunct private railway company in Sweden
- Serbia and Montenegro, known as Federal Republic of Yugoslavia from 1992 to 2003 (Serbian: Savezna Republika Jugoslavija)
- Spherical Rolling Joint, a high precision ball joint consisting of a spherical outer and inner race separated by ball bearings
