= SJ Tp =

Tp
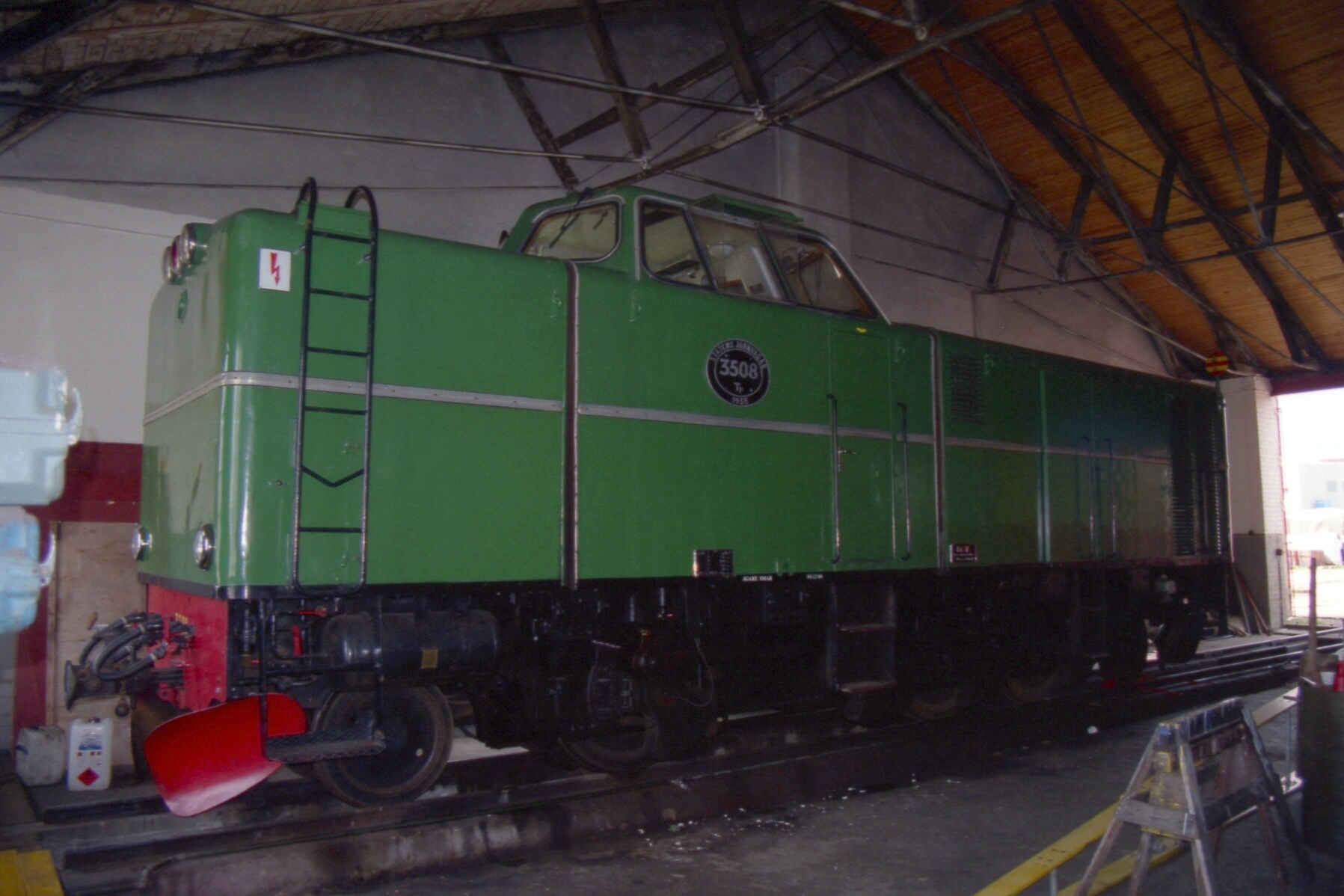
- Tp 3508 Skara 01.06.00
Type and origin
- Power type: Diesel-hydraulic
- Builder: Maschinenbau Kiel; Svenska Järnvägsverkstäderna
- Build date: 1953–1954
- Total produced: 25
Specifications
- Configuration
  - UIC: 1'C1' (Tp); D (T23)
- Gauge: 891 mm (2 ft 11 3/32 in) (Tp); 1,435 mm (4 ft 8 1/2 in) (T23)
- Length: 10,700 mm (35 ft 1 1/4 in)
- Loco weight: 46 tonnes (45 long tons; 51 short tons) tare weight
- Transmission: Hydraulic
Performance figures
- Maximum speed: 80 km/h (50 mph)
- Power output: 550 kW (740 hp)
Career
- Operators: Statens Järnvägar
- Numbers: 3500-3524

Tp was a diesel-hydraulic locomotive operated by Swedish State Railways (Swedish: Statens Järnvägar, SJ) for hauling freight trains on its 891 mm (2 ft 11 3/32 in) narrow gauge railways. 25 were built in total, 20 by Maschinenbau Kiel and five on licence by Svenska Järnvägsverkstäderna (The Swedish Railway Workshops).

During the 1960s most of the narrow gauge railways were converted to standard gauge, and SJ chose to rebuild the locomotives to this gauge, and also change the axle system to D, giving them the designation T23. Of the remaining ten Tps, six were scrapped in the 1970s while the last four remained in service until the 1980s. The latter have all been preserved.
