= Swedish three-foot–gauge railways =

Railway track gauge (891 mm)

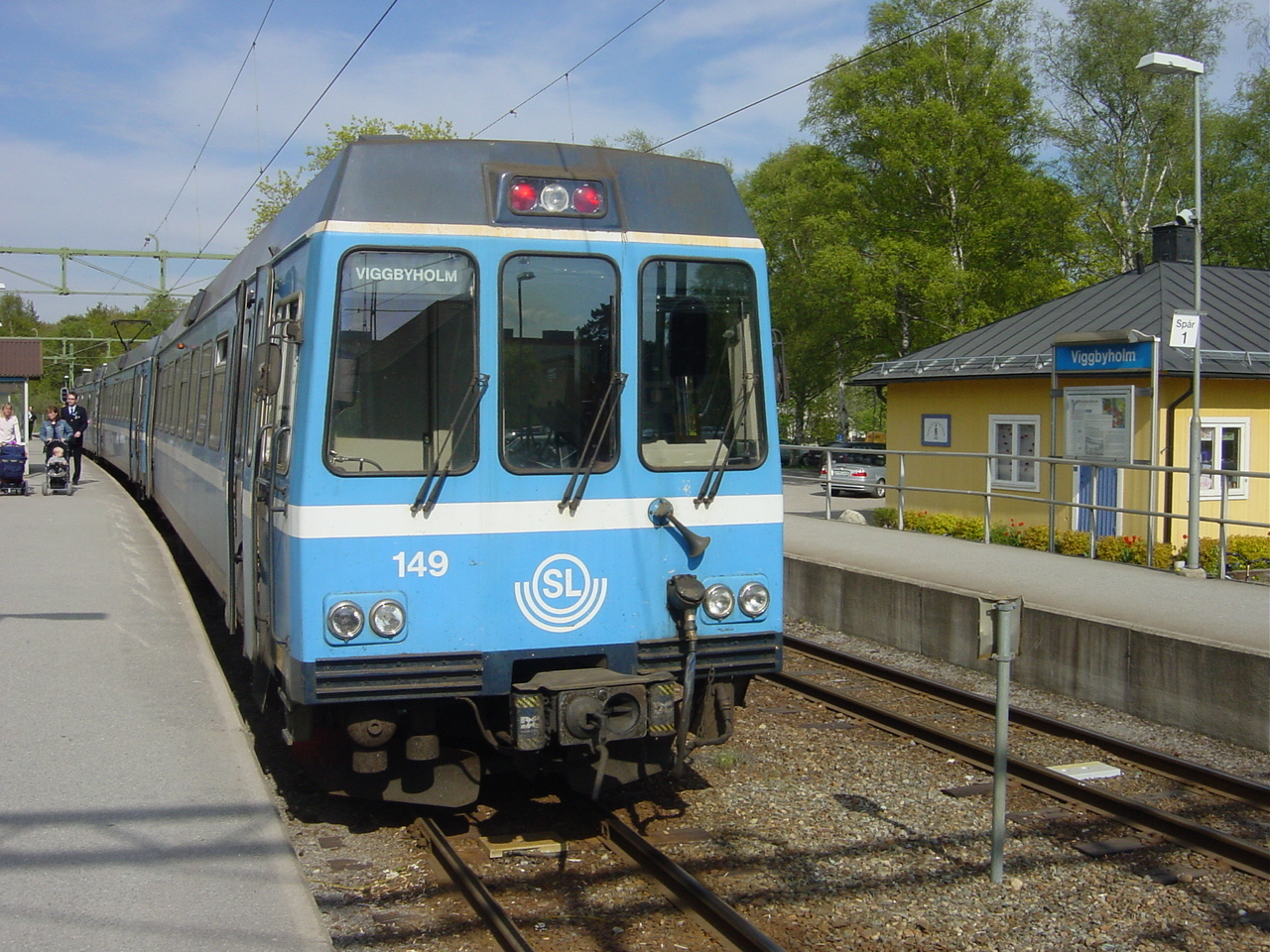
The Roslagen railway, a suburban railway north of Stockholm using the Swedish three-foot gauge

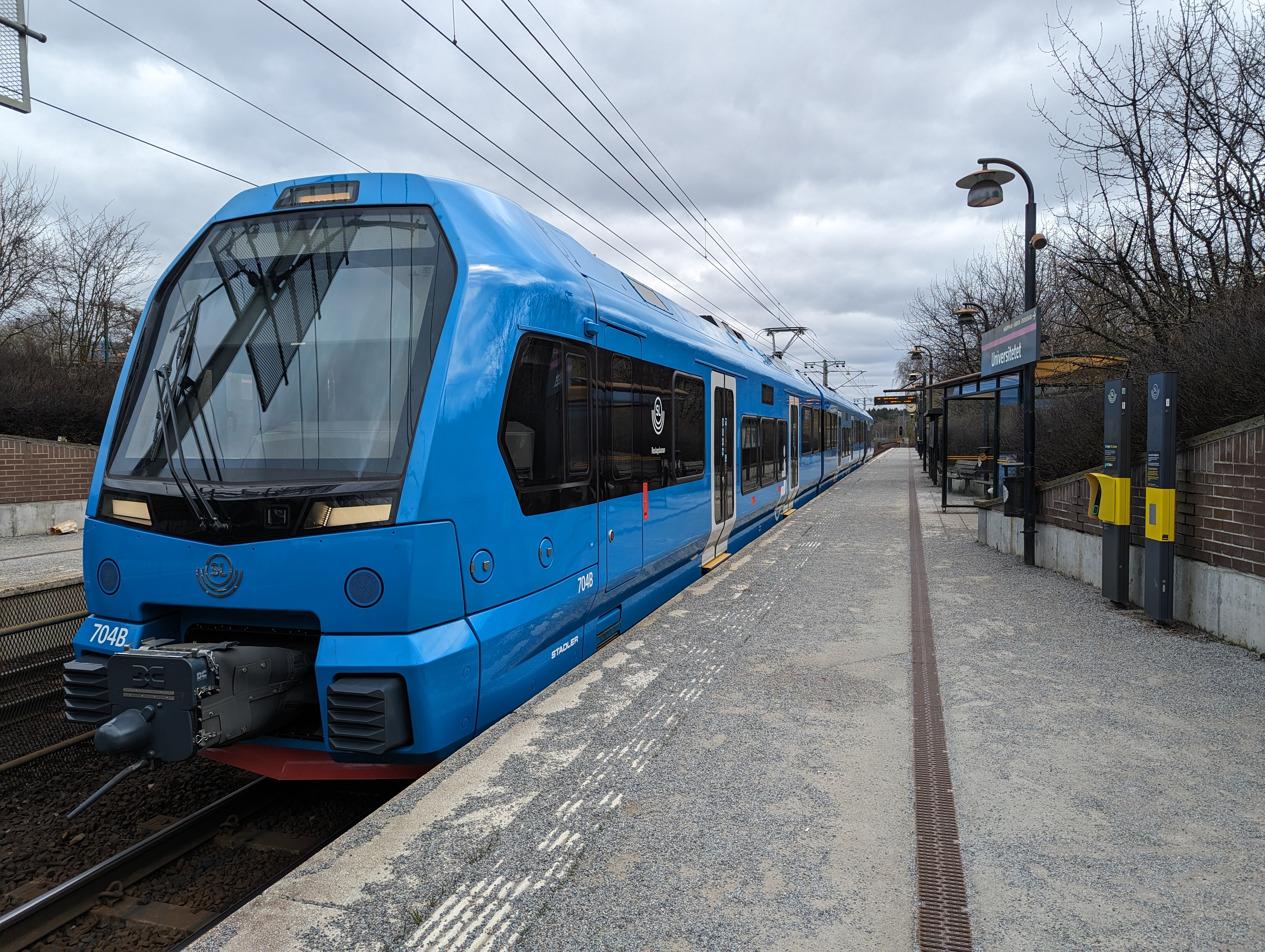

Swedish three-foot–gauge railways (Swedish: "trefotsbanor") are railways with the gauge 891 mm (2 ft 11 3/32 in), or 3 Swedish feet in the old Swedish measurement system. Railways with this gauge have only existed in Sweden. This was the most common narrow gauge in Sweden. As of 2016, the total network with this gauge is 65 km (40 mi), all of which is electrified (excluding lines which only remain as heritage railways).

Sweden once had some fairly extensive narrow-gauge railways, but most are now closed. Some were converted to standard gauge (the latest one was KBJ, Kalmar–Berga Järnväg, between Berga and Kalmar in the 1970s) and some remain as heritage railways.

The only commercial Swedish three-foot–gauge railway still in use is the suburban railway Roslagsbanan ('the Roslagen Railway') in north-eastern Stockholm. The parts of this railway which are still in use will be in continual use in the foreseeable future, with new trains delivered in 2023 and there are even plans for a new line to connect this railway to Arlanda Airport.

A branch line of Roslagsbanan, Långängsbanan, was built in 1911 and ran for some years as an isolated 1,435 mm (4 ft 8 1/2 in) standard gauge tramway in anticipation of a planned conversion of the main line to raise its capacity, but those plans came to naught and the branch was rebuilt to narrow gauge in 1934; it is closed since 1966.

The Nordmark-Klarälvens Järnväg (NKlJ) was a 175 km (109 mi) network issued from different lines built from 1873. It was electrified in 1920, with 15 AEG-locomotives. A new class of 5 locomotives (ASEA) went in 1961. The network was dismantled in 1990. Only Karlstad-Skoghall was regauged to standard gauge and transferred to SJ.

The longest remaining Swedish three-foot–gauge railway is the 126 km (78 mi) heritage line from Åseda to Virserum, Hultsfred and Västervik. 70 km (43 mi) between Hultsfred and Västervik are served by daily tourist trains in the summer, including 4 km (2.5 mi) of dual-gauge track. Tourist railbuses also run along the southernmost 27 km (17 mi) (Åseda–Virserum), albeit less frequent. The middle section (Virserum–Hultsfred, 29 km (18 mi), is only used by draisines or not at all.

The Vadstena–Fågelsta narrow-gauge railway was part of a larger network in Östergötland.

The gauge difference to the internationally much more used 900 mm (2 ft 11 7/16 in) is small, only 9 mm (3/8 in), and some used 900 mm vehicles have been brought to Sweden and given a slight wheel adaptation (reducing the flange by 4 mm or 0.157 in using turning).

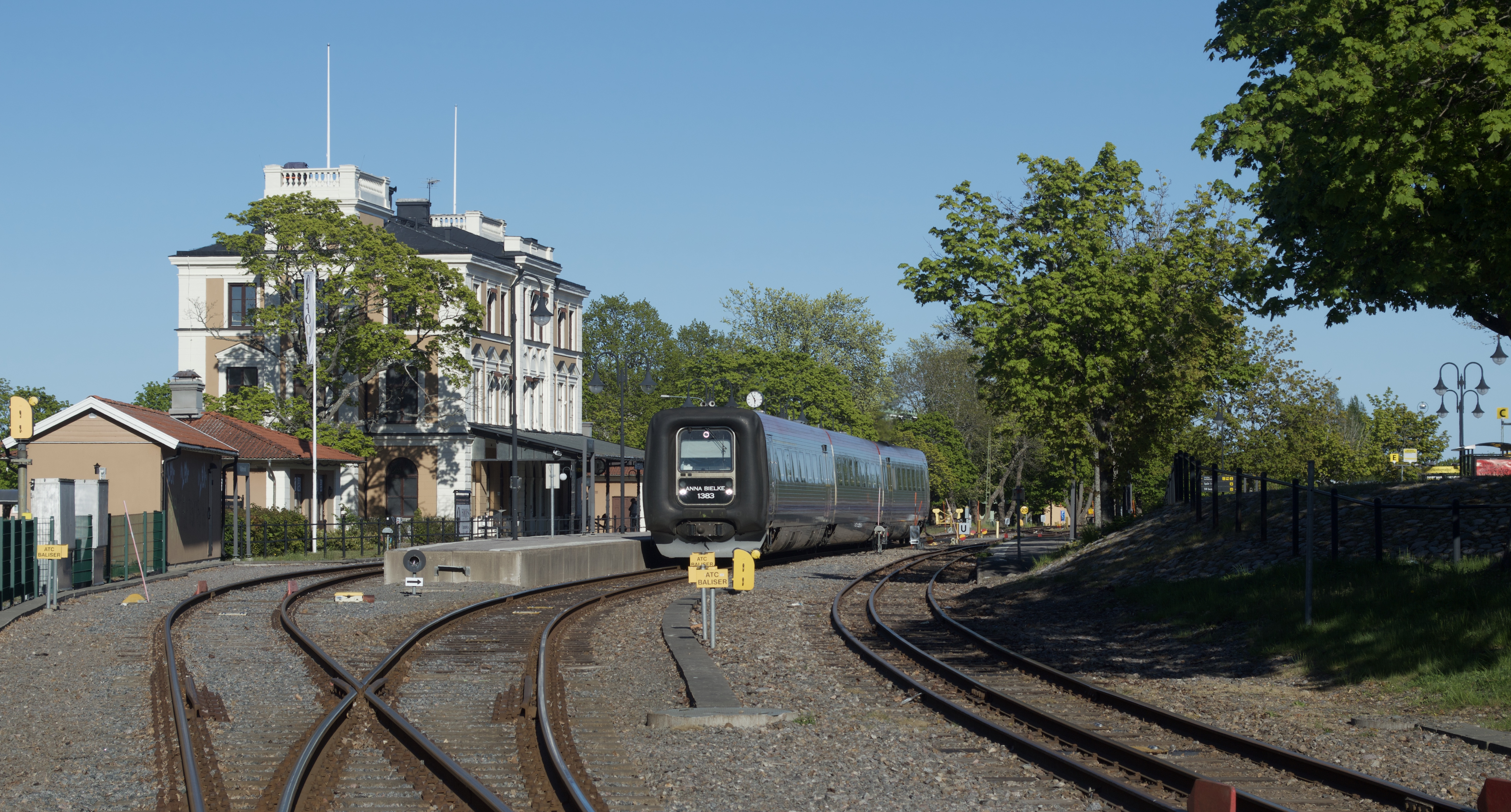
Västervik Y2R 1383/ IC3 train, dual-gauge 1,435 mm (4 ft 8 1/2 in) and 891 mm (2 ft 11 3/32 in)

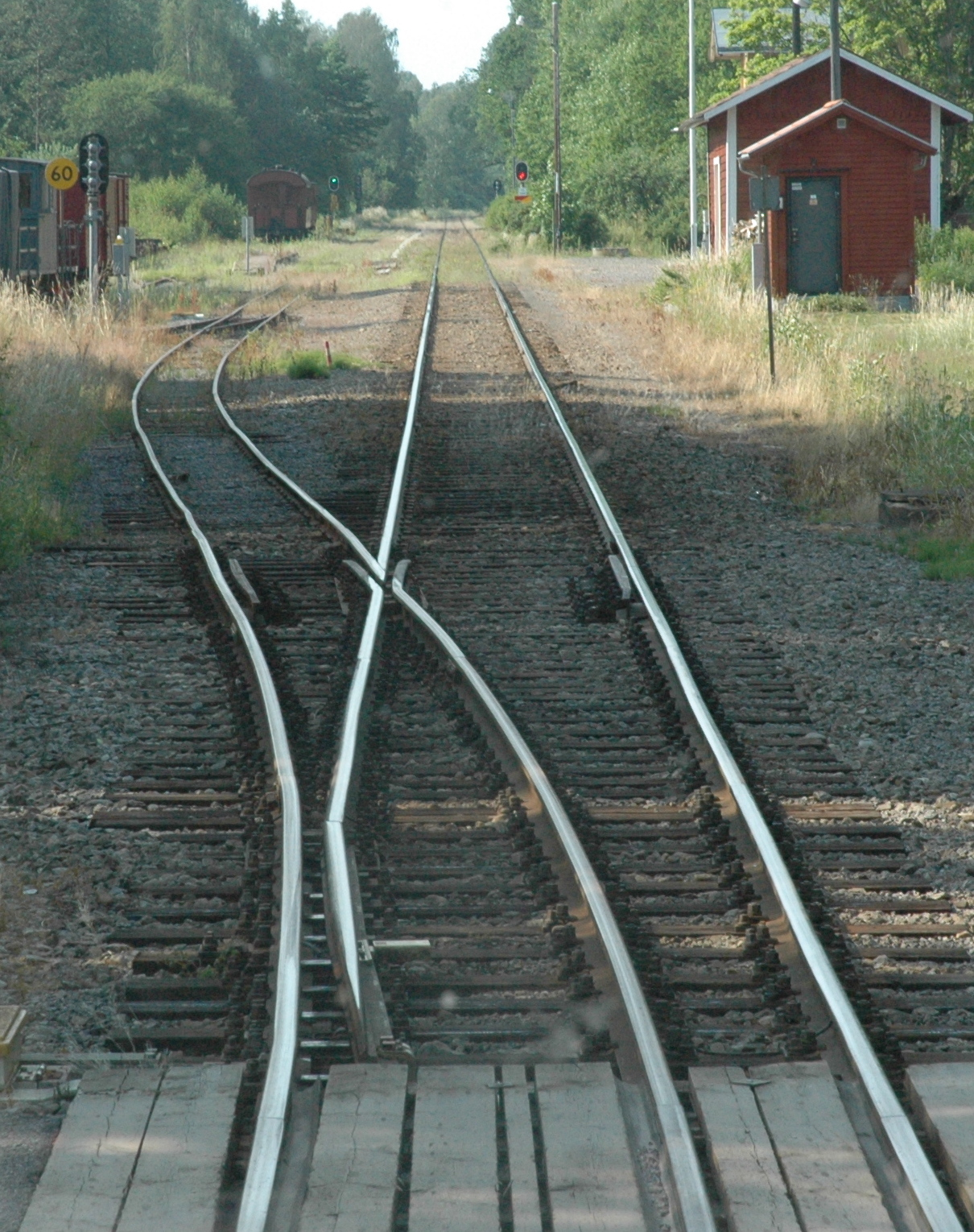
Dual-gauge 1,435 mm (4 ft 8 1/2 in) and 891 mm (2 ft 11 3/32 in) and turnout at Jenny, Sweden

== See also ==
- Narrow-gauge railways in Sweden
- Swedish units of measurement
- Djursholmsbanan
- Gotland Hesselby Railway
- Roslagsbanan
- Stockholm–Roslagens Järnvägar
- Stortyskarna
- Sundsvall–Torpshammar Railway
- Upsala–Lenna Jernväg
