= Gimo, Sweden =

Gimo
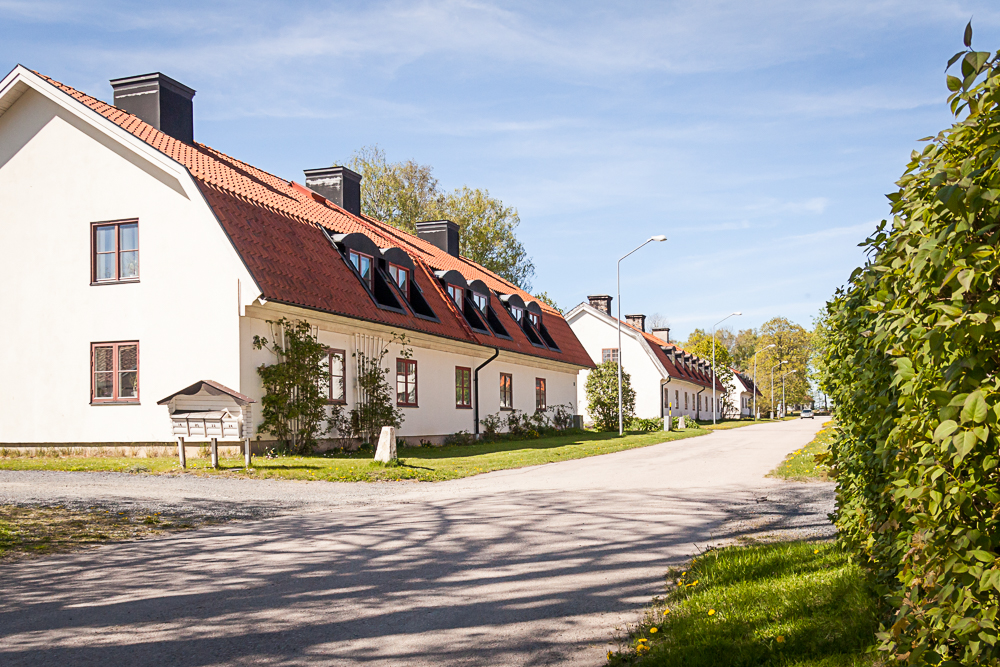
- A street in Gimo (Stenhusgatan)

- Location within Uppsala Location within Sweden
- Coordinates: 60°11′N 18°11′E
- Country: Sweden
- Province: Uppland
- County: Uppsala County
- Municipality: Östhammar Municipality

Area
  - Total: 3.13 km^{2} (1.21 sq mi)

Population (31 December 2020)
  - Total: 2,796
  - Density: 893/km^{2} (2,310/sq mi)
- Time zone: UTC+1 (CET)
  - Summer (DST): UTC+2 (CEST)

Gimo (Swedish pronunciation: [ˈjǐːmʊ]) is a small town situated in Östhammar Municipality, Uppsala County, Sweden with 2,765 inhabitants in 2017. The town is located about 20 km west of the Baltic Sea coast and 50 km north of Uppsala. Gimo is best known for the production plant of Sandvik Coromant with 1,500 employees (2019).

== History ==
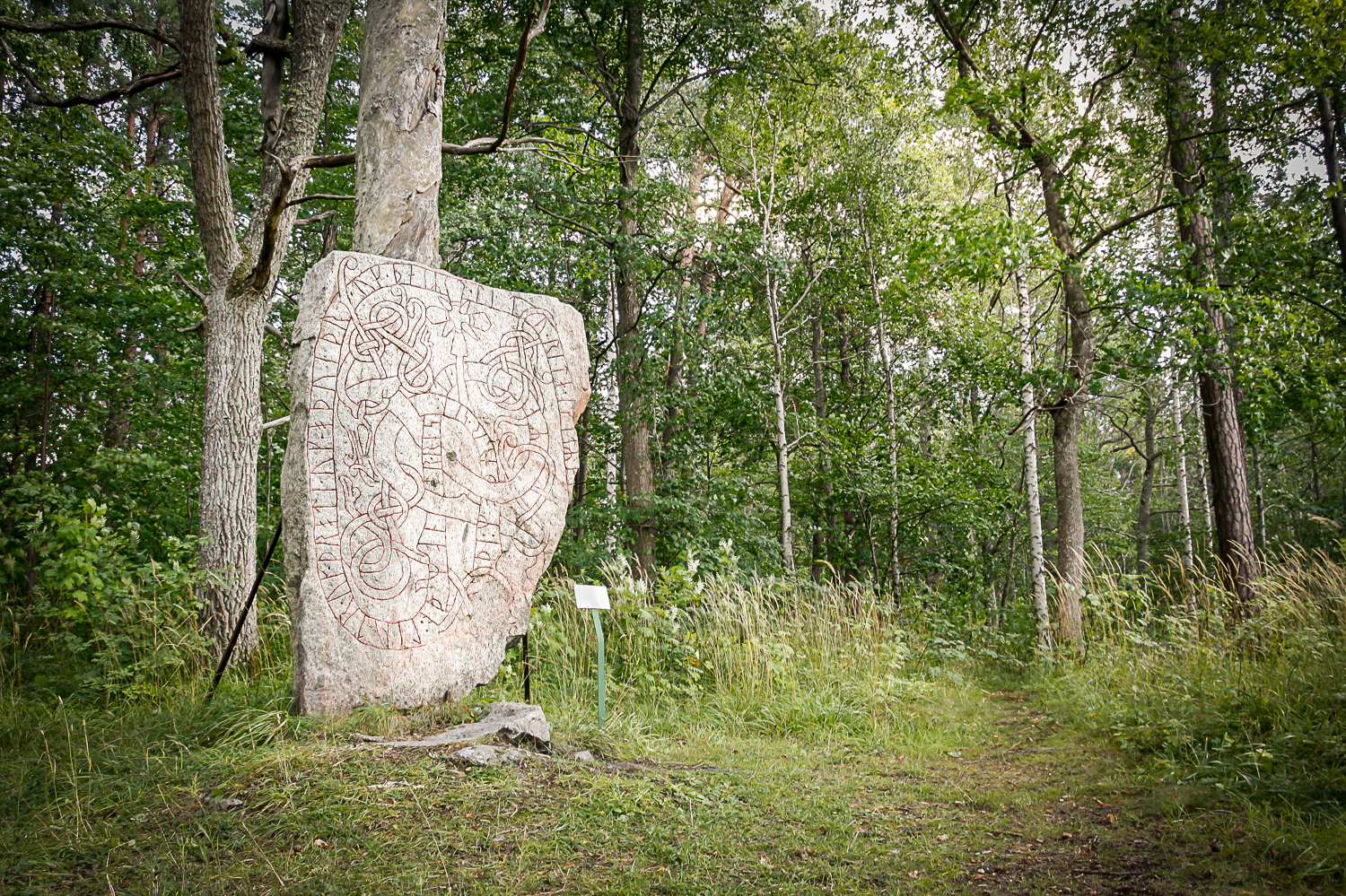
The runestone in Gimo, Sweden

Little is known about the early history of Gimo. A rune stone from the 10th century is located near the reservoir Gimo Damm. The first mention of the place was in the years 1375–1376 when it was described as the village "Gimmu". The church in Gimo is called "Skäfthammar kyrka" and was probably built in the late 15th century.

The ironworks of the area has a thousand year long history. No one knows exactly when the ironworks of Gimo was founded, but the first written records are from 1615 when Hans Sifversson built iron works on behalf of the crown. Louis De Geer bought the iron works in 1643 and expanded the business. The present main building of the Gimo mansion was completed in 1767. Gimo was connected 1876 by railroad through Stockholm-Roslagens Järnvägar (Dannemora-Gimo-Hargshamn-Hallstavik 1876 and Faringe-Gimo 1921).

== Industrial heritage ==
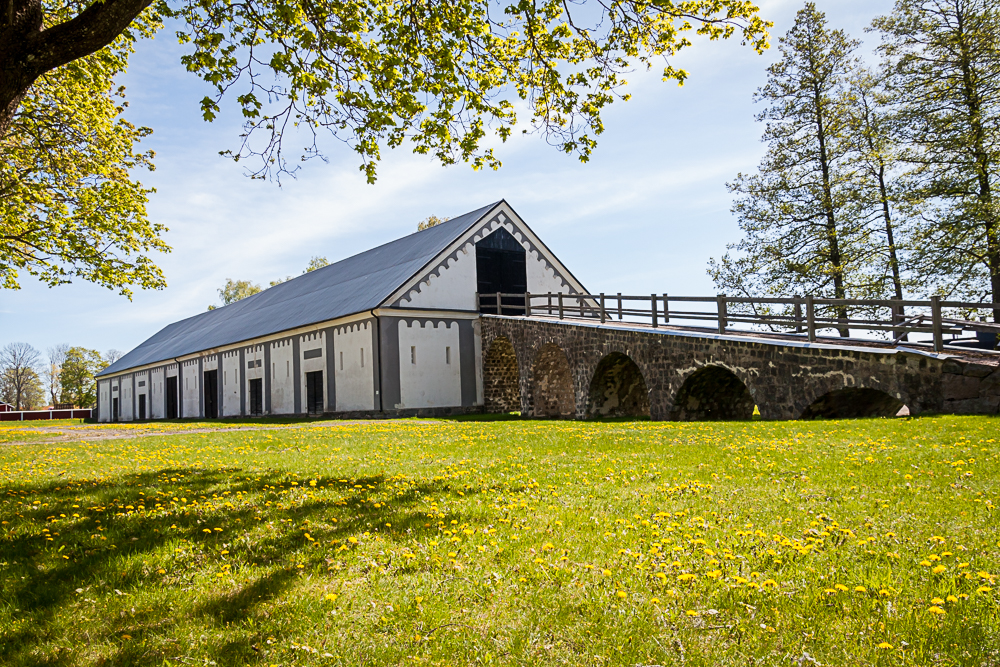
Charcoal storage in Gimo

Gimo has a long industrial heritage that is usually taken to date from 1615 when the Swedish Crown built a foundry here. After being ennobled, Louis de Geer was then given permission to purchase the Gimo works, which he had originally leased. Under de Geer's direction, the facility in Gimo was developed into an ironworks with both a blast furnace and hammer. The de Geer family owned the works until 1756 when it was acquired by the businessmen John Jennings and Robert Finlay.

The ironworks was founded by the Swedish Crown and operated from 1615 to 1945 under the ownership of the Reuterskiöld family. It was restructured into a joint-stock company in the early 1900s and finished operating around 1920. In the 1940s Wilhelm Haglund became responsible for developing the manufacture of hard metal tools at Sandvikens Jernverks (the equivalent of today's Sandvik). Under his direction, a suitable location for a new factory was sought and Gimo was chosen. In 1951 the facility was established here and has since developed into the world leader in the industry that it is today. Today (2017) there are 1500 employees producing metal cutting tools for industrial purposes.

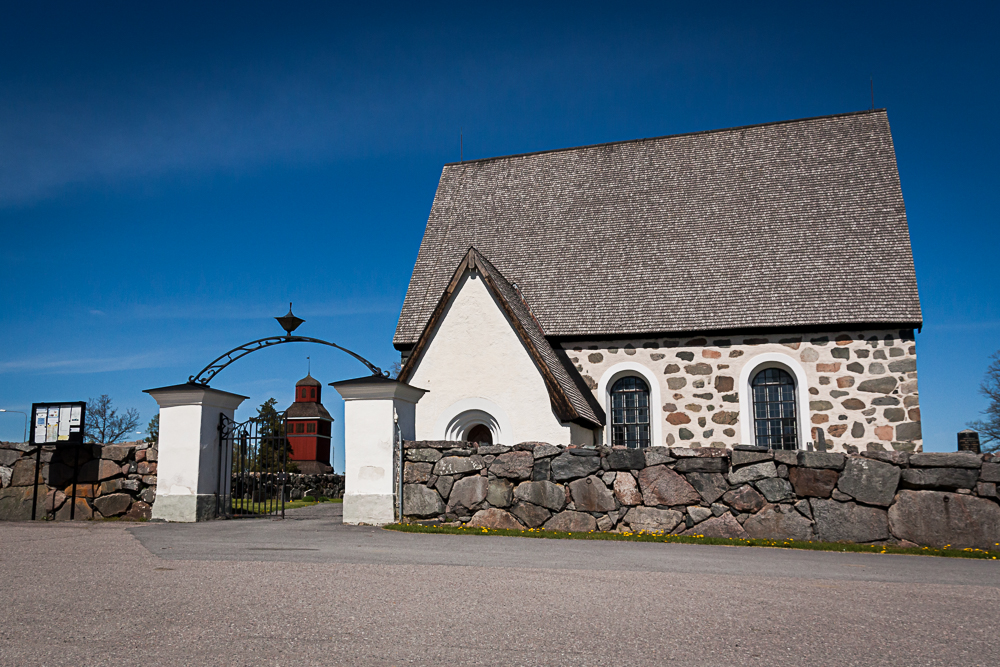
The Skäfthammar church in Gimo

Gimo Mansion, which was built in the 1700s, is currently used as a hotel and conference centre and is a popular place to visit.

== Trade and industry today ==
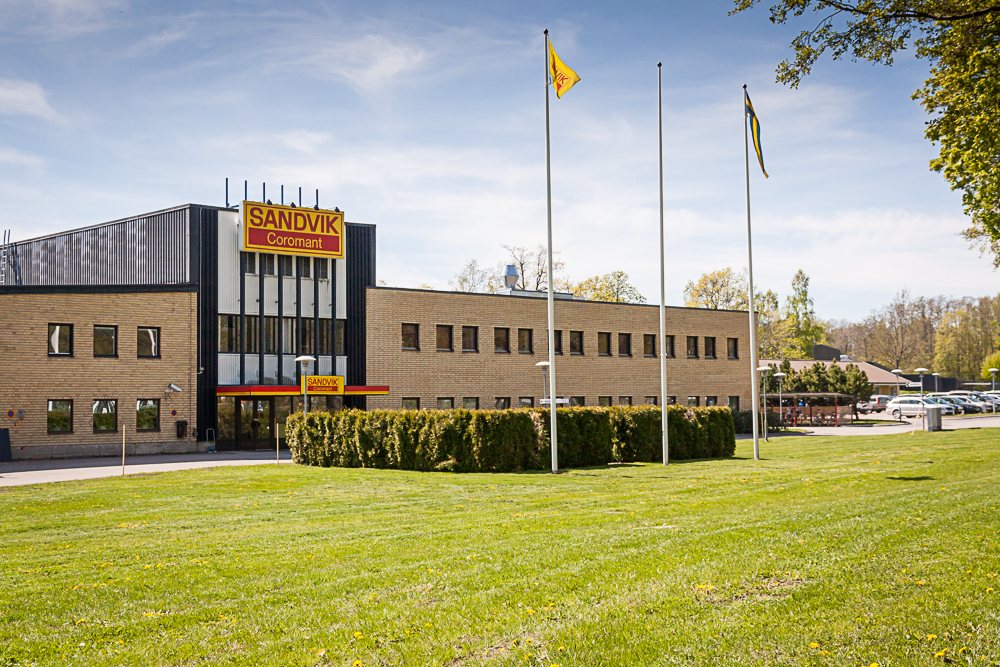
Sandvik Coromant in Gimo, Sweden

Today the village is dominated by the hard metal industry in the form of Sandvik Coromant, which employs approximately 1,500 (2019). Extremely hard metal blades are manufactured here and exported throughout the world. The blades are manufactured from powdered metal that is sintered together under high pressure. The company's activities are divided into two plants, one manufacturing the blades themselves and the other manufacturing the holders in which the blades are housed.

== The village ==
There are several sporting facilities in Gimo: ice rink, swimming pool, football pitches, riding school, rooms for martial arts and a ski centre with artificial snow. Lake Gimodamm has a beach. The village has two preschools, three primary and lower secondary schools and two sixth-form colleges. The two sixth-form colleges are Gimo Bruksgymnasium and Wilhelm Haglunds Gymnasium. Wilhelm Haglunds is an industrial engineering college that is 91% owned by Sandvik Coromant.

== Society ==
Gimo has several schools up to secondary schools (gymnasium). There are facilities for a number of sports (swimming), skating, skiing, soccer, horse riding, etc. The beach by lake Gimo Damm is a popular place for outdoor swimming.

Images from Gimo
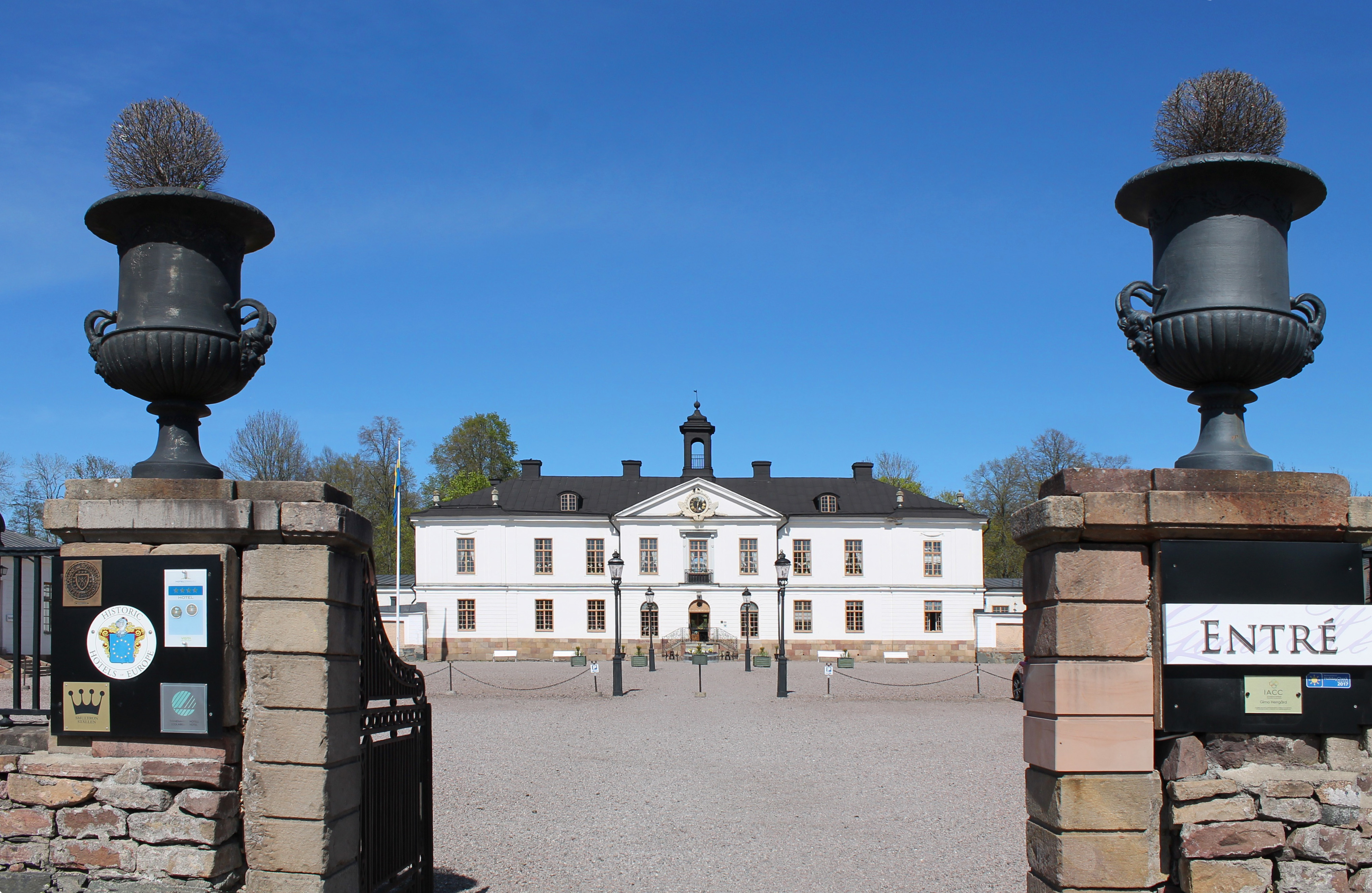
Gimo mansion

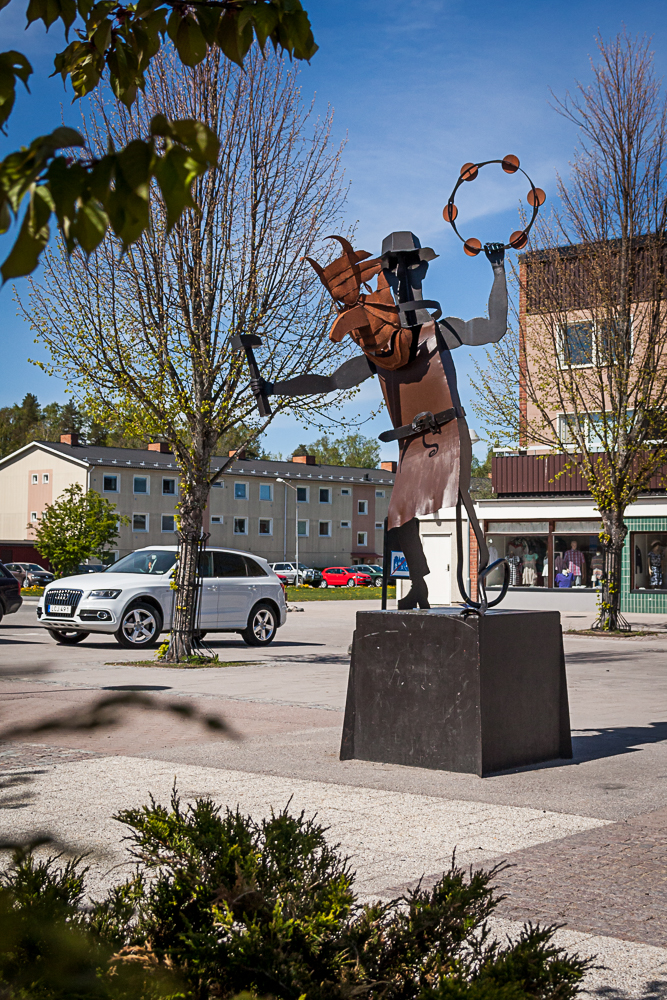
Sculpture at Gimo torg (the main square)

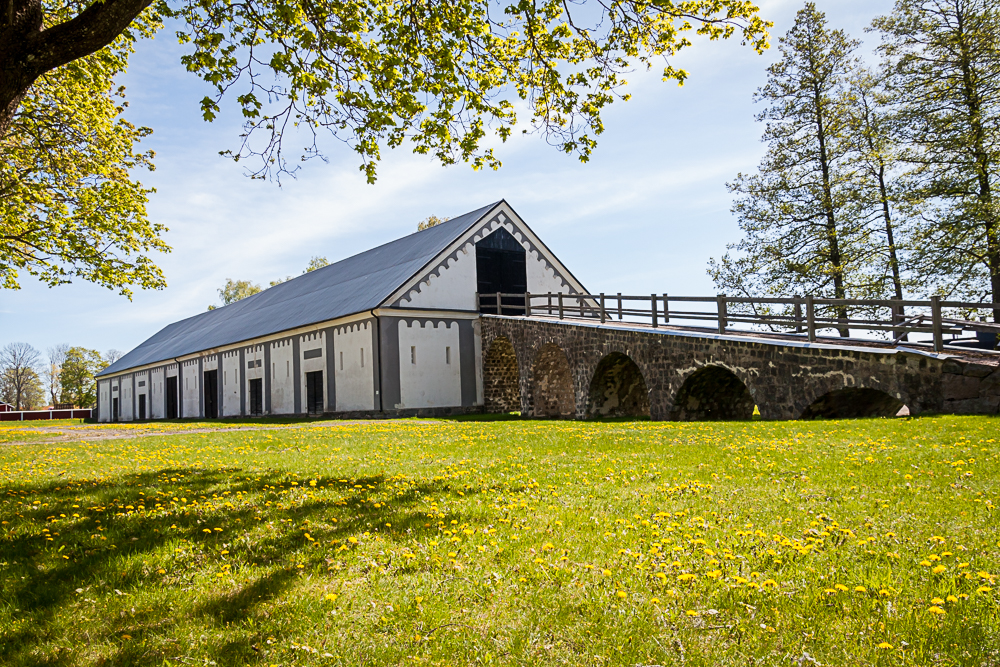
Coal storage

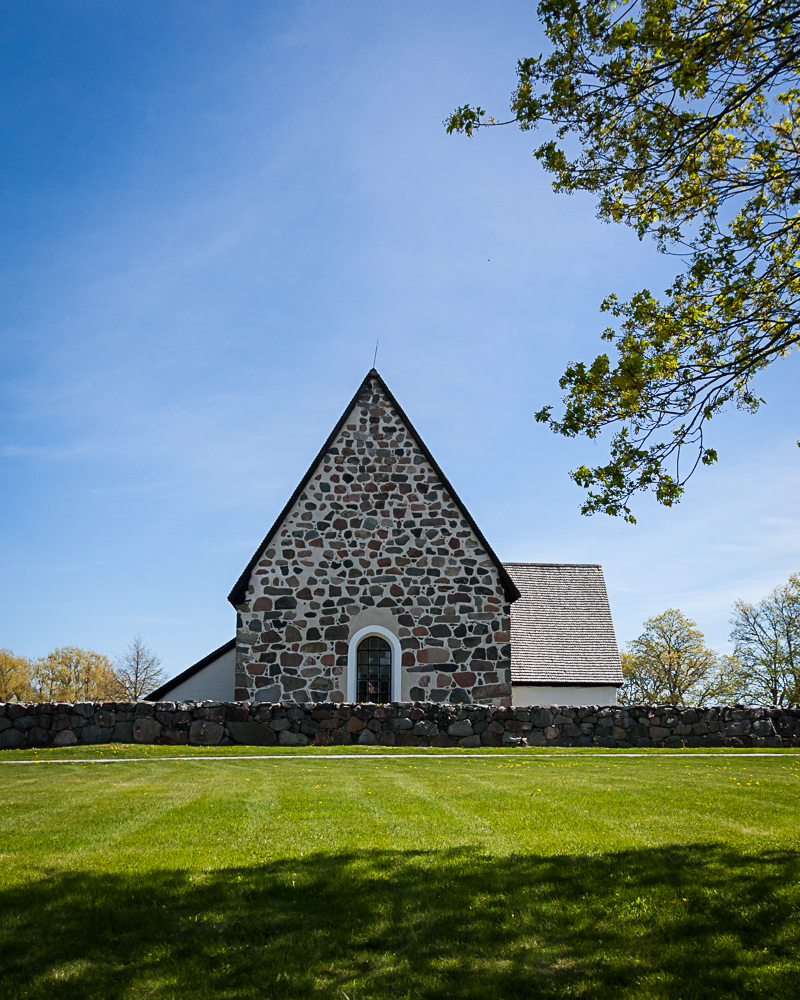
The church of Skäfthammar

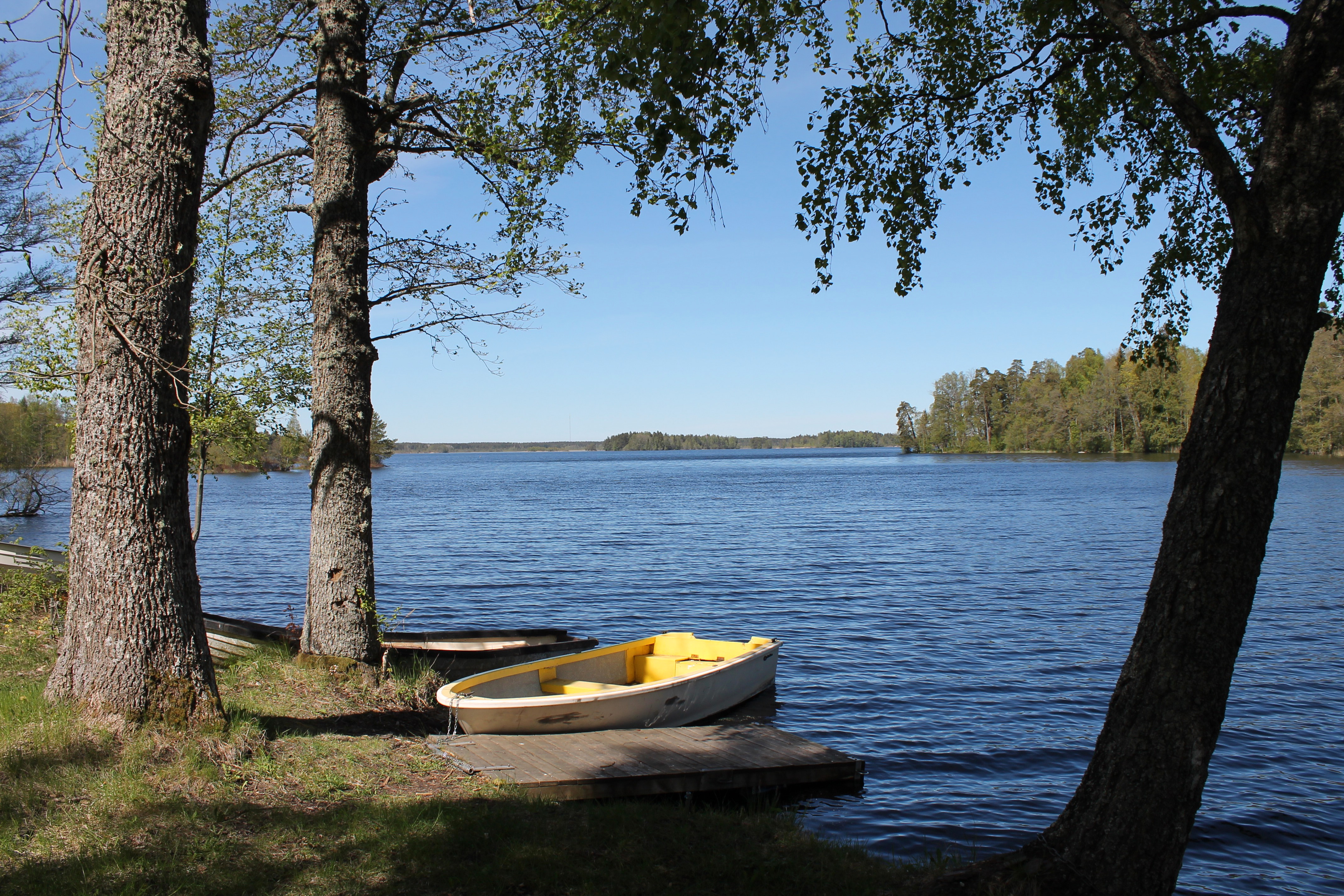
The lake Gimo damm worked as a reservoir for the iron works.

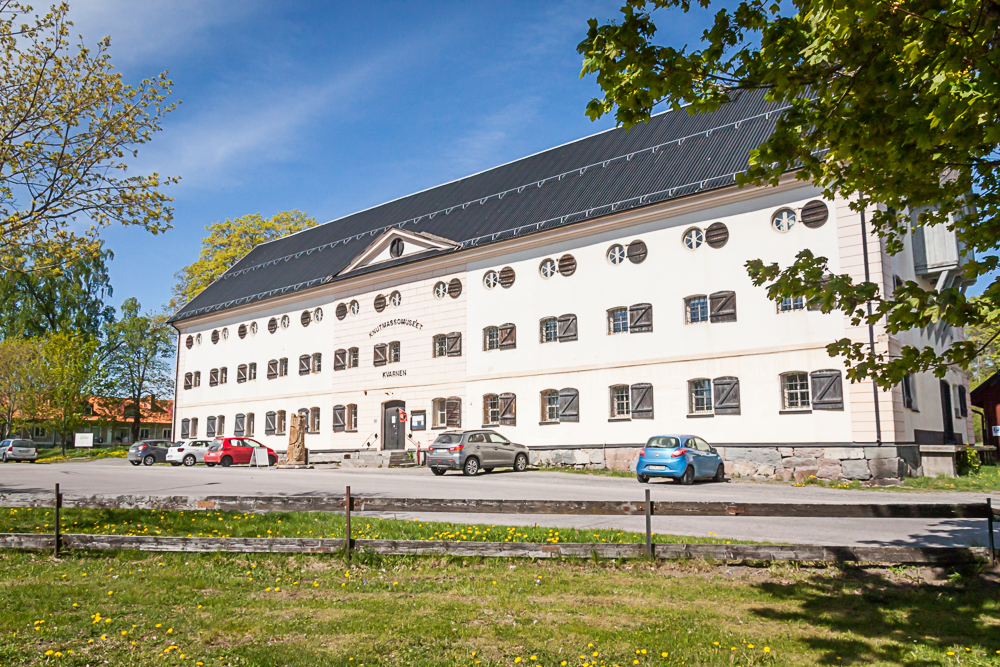
The museum of Gimo

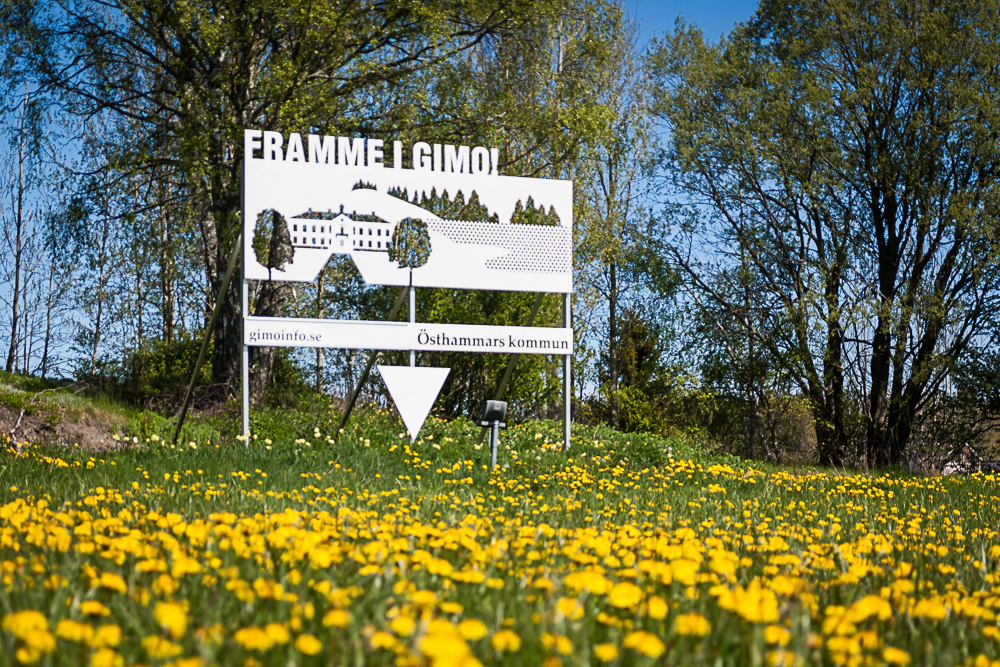
Welcome to Gimo sign

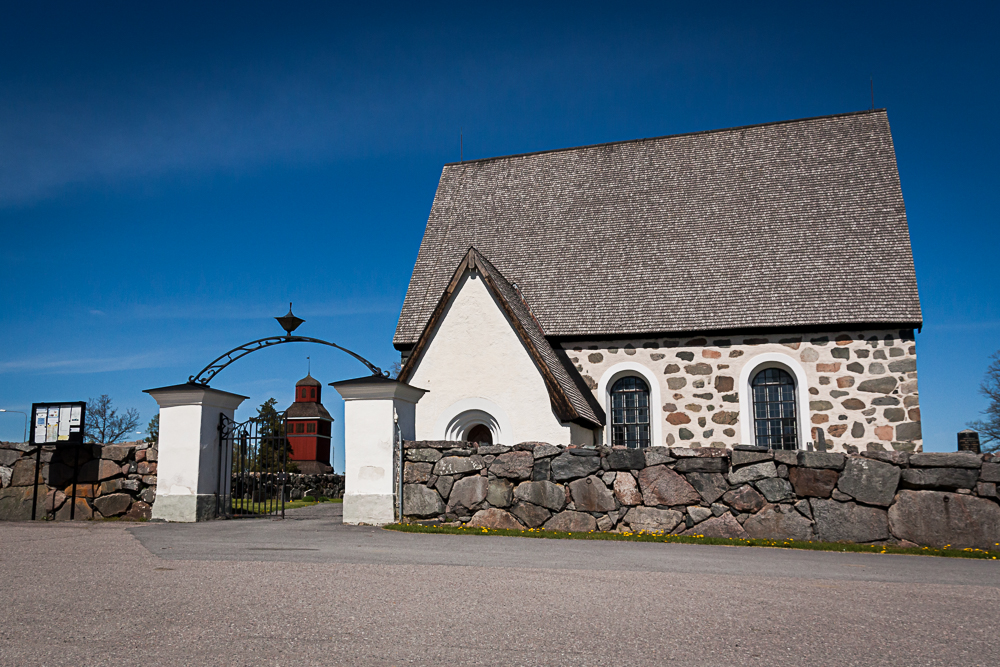
Entrance of Skäfthammar church.
