= Rimbo =

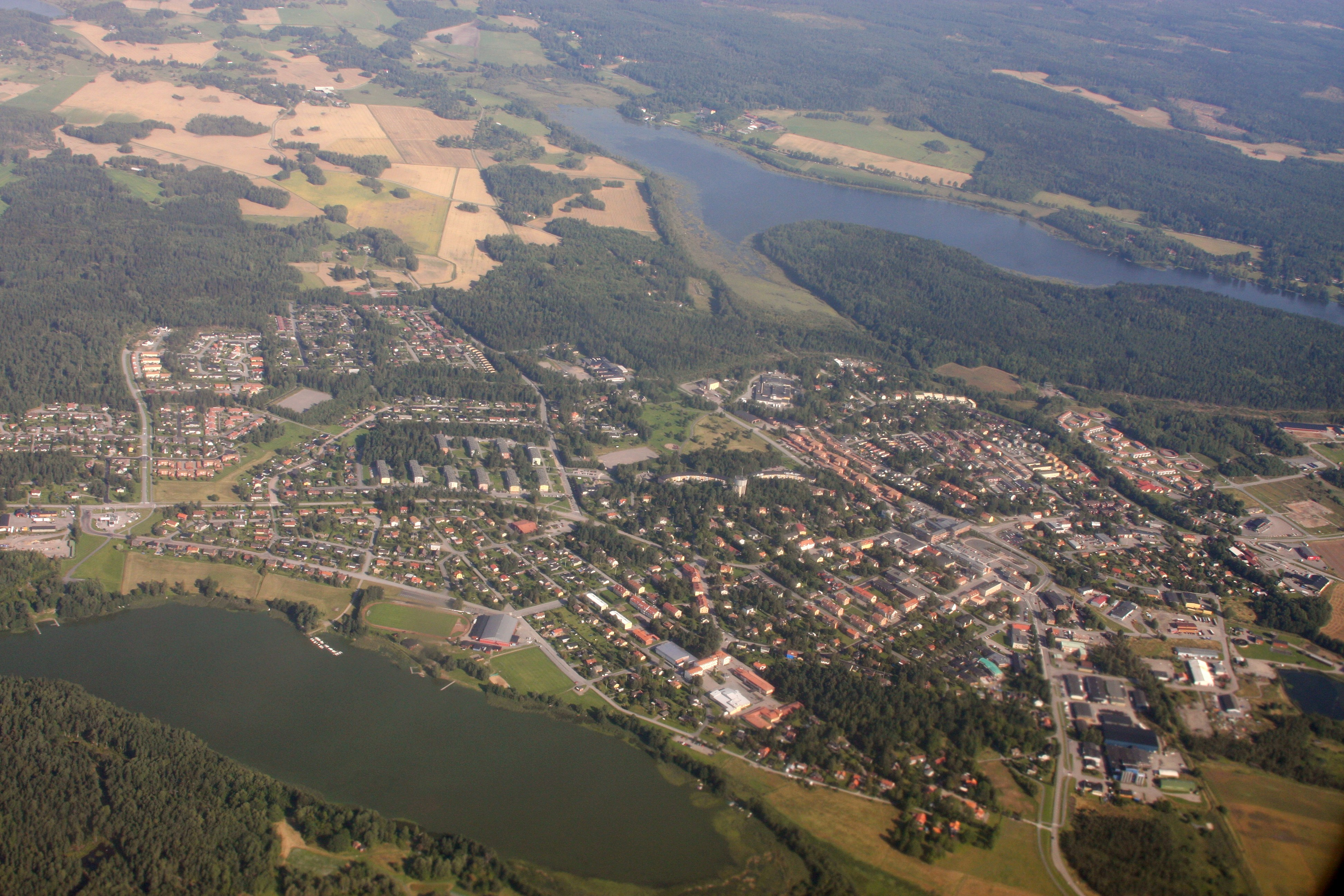
- Aerial view from South

- Location within Stockholm Location within Sweden
- Coordinates: 59°44′40″N 18°22′07.2″E
- Country: Sweden
- Province: Uppland
- County: Stockholm County
- Municipality: Norrtälje Municipality

Area
  - Total: 2.57 km^{2} (0.99 sq mi)

Population (31 December 2020)
  - Total: 5,223
  - Density: 2,030/km^{2} (5,260/sq mi)
- Time zone: UTC+1 (CET)
  - Summer (DST): UTC+2 (CEST)

Rimbo (Swedish pronunciation: [ˈrɪ̌mːbʊ]) is a locality situated in Norrtälje Municipality, Stockholm County, Sweden, with 4,629 inhabitants in 2010. Rimbo is located about 20 km (12 mi) west of the municipal seat of Norrtälje.

Rimbo grew up as a railhead at the junction between the narrow gauge railways to Uppsala and Norrtälje (1884), Stockholm (1885) and Hallstavik (1896). The last line (to Stockholm, part of Roslagsbanan) was closed in 1981. A formal decision has been taken to reopen the 14 km line to Kårsta (the present northern terminus of Roslagsbanan), but no funds have been allocated.

Rimbo has a successful men's handball team, Rimbo HK Roslagen, which played in the first tier of the Swedish handball system (Elitserien (men's handball)) in the 2013–2014 season.
