= Hargshamn =

- Location within Uppsala Location within Sweden
- Coordinates: 60°10′N 18°28′E
- Country: Sweden
- Province: Uppland
- County: Uppsala County
- Municipality: Östhammar Municipality

Area
  - Total: 0.84 km^{2} (0.32 sq mi)

Population (31 December 2020)
  - Total: 292
  - Density: 350/km^{2} (900/sq mi)
- Time zone: UTC+1 (CET)
  - Summer (DST): UTC+2 (CEST)

Hargshamn is a locality situated in Östhammar Municipality, Uppsala County, Sweden with 312 inhabitants in 2010. In 1878 a narrow-gauge railway was built between the port and Dannemora, to the west, which was a center of iron mining. The port became important for export of iron ores. Much of their product was sent to England, where the ore was highly valued. In 2012 the mine at Dannemora was reopened.
