= Hallstavik =

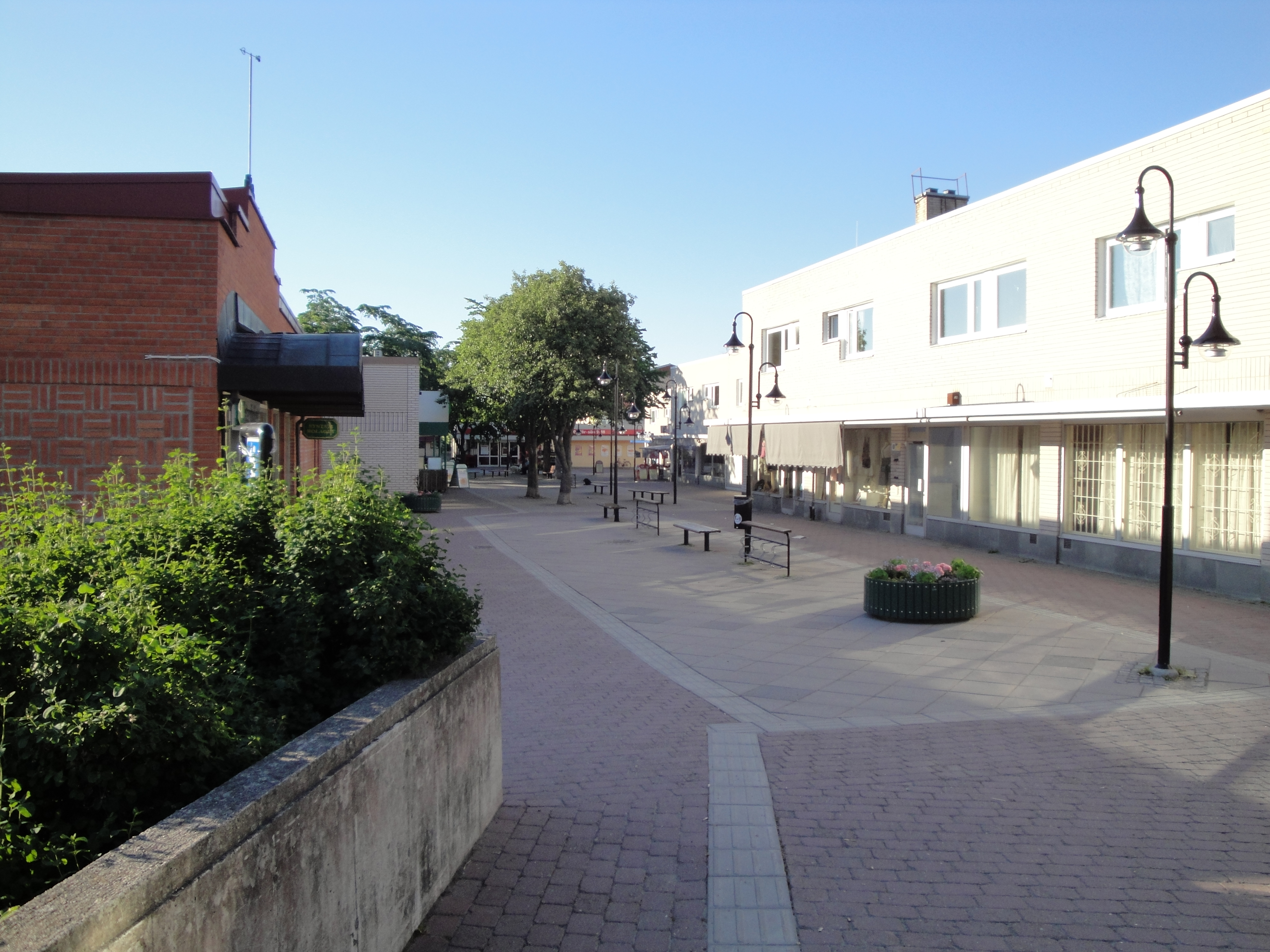
- Central Hallstavik

- Location within Stockholm Location within Sweden Location within European Union
- Coordinates: 60°03′N 18°36′E
- Country: Sweden
- Province: Uppland
- County: Stockholm County
- Municipality: Norrtälje Municipality

Area
  - Total: 4.69 km^{2} (1.81 sq mi)

Population (31 December 2020)
  - Total: 4,741
  - Density: 1,010/km^{2} (2,620/sq mi)
- Time zone: UTC+1 (CET)
  - Summer (DST): UTC+2 (CEST)

Hallstavik is a locality situated in Norrtälje Municipality, Stockholm County, Sweden with 4,476 inhabitants in 2010. The town is famous for its papermill and the Speedway team Rospiggarna.

== The modern Hallstavik ==
An established project organization, Hallstaviks Network, coordinates everything that happens in and around Hallstavik. Outdoor swimming was completed and inaugurated in 2010. Other projects are meeting places for the youth and Skebo Rivers, focused on sportfishing for trout.

Holmen Paper is a business area within the Holmen Group with paper mills in Norrköping and Hallstavik. The Group also owns forest and power assets. A feasibility study was done to investigate taking advantage of waste heat from the paper mill in Hallstavik.

Hallstavik's Minnah Karlsson came second in the Swedish Idol 2010. She was one of the few Idol participants world over who was voted out, then came back and got to the final.

== Image gallery ==
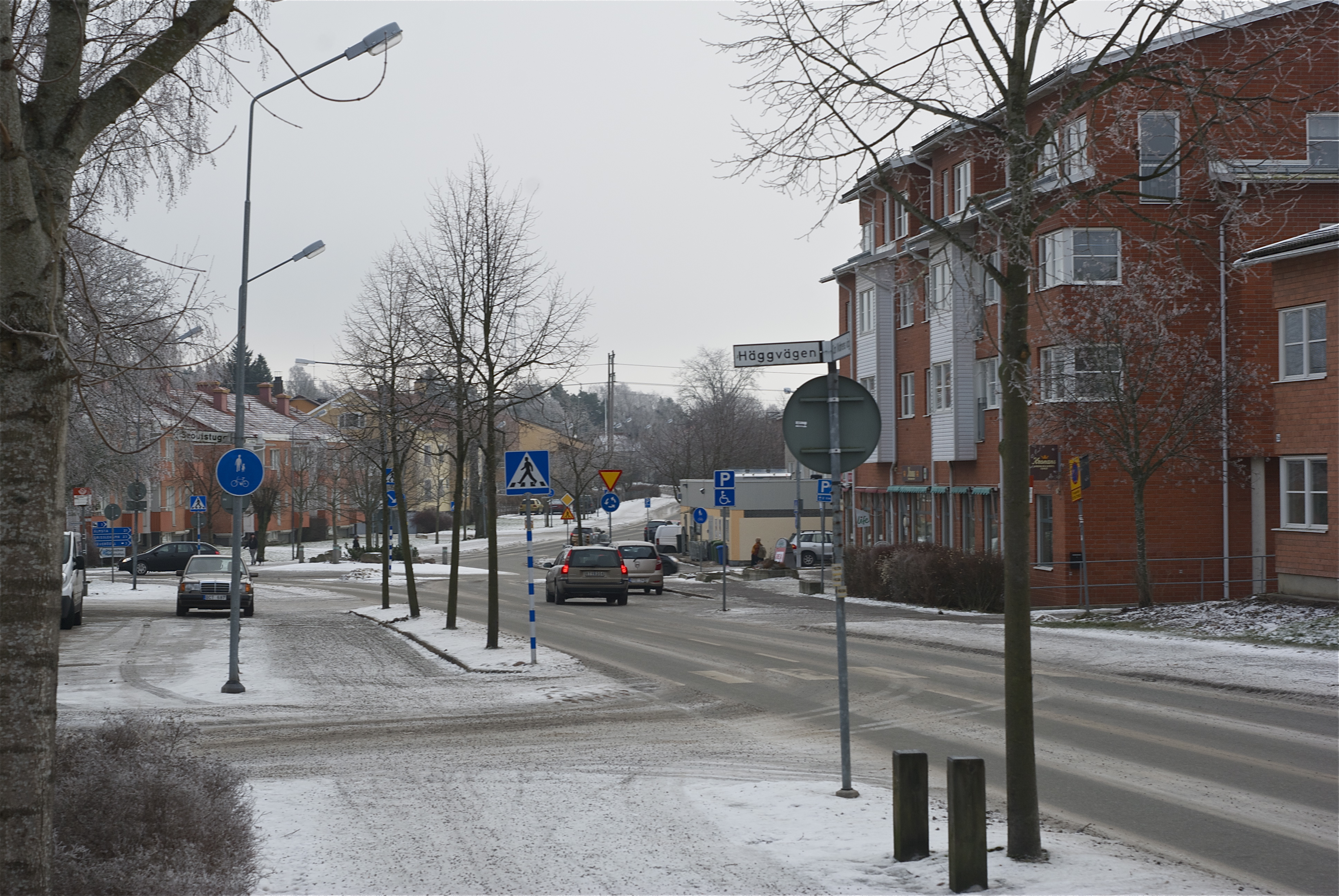
Central Hallstavik

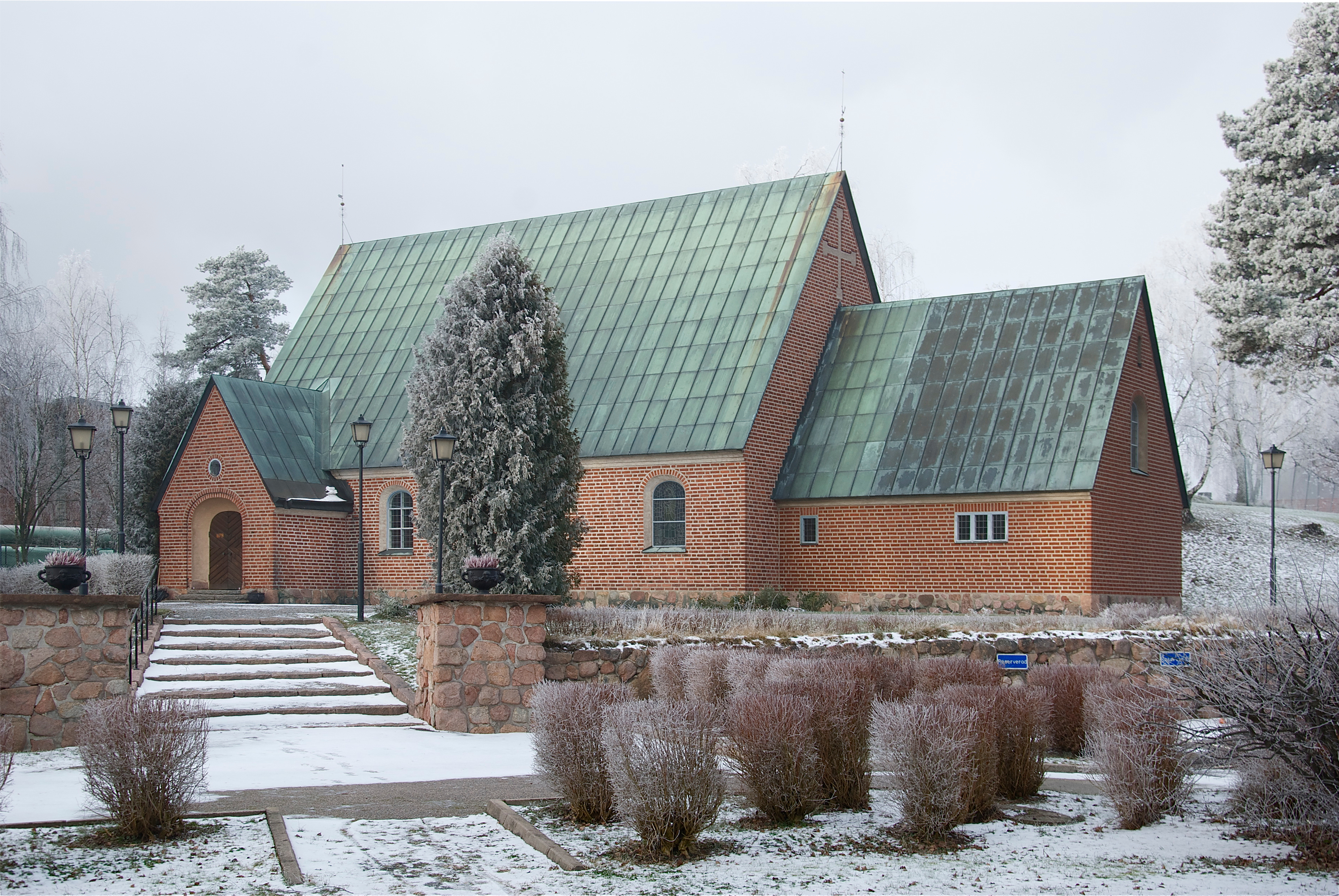
Hallstavik church

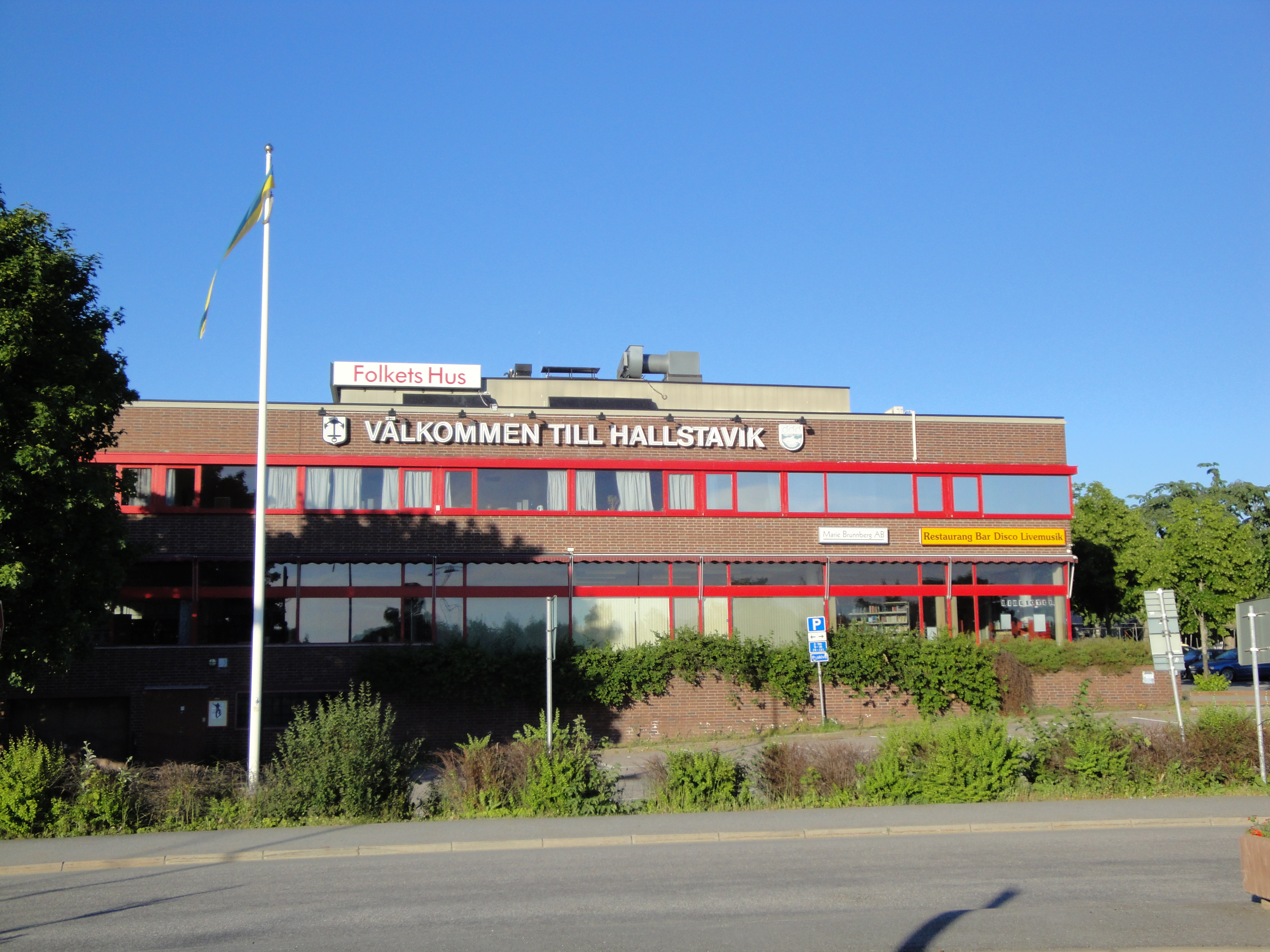
Folkets Hus
