= Ekeby =

Ekeby may refer to:

== Places ==
=== Sweden ===
- Ekeby, Bjuv, locality situated in Bjuv Municipality, Skåne County
- Ekeby, Djursholm, locality situated in Danderyd Municipality, Stockholm County
  - Djursholms Ekeby railway station on Roslagsbanan
- Ekeby, Gotland, a settlement on the island of Gotland
- Ekeby, Kumla, locality situated in Kumla Municipality, Örebro County
- Ekeby, Munsö socken, locality in Ekerö Municipality, Stockholm County
- Ekeby, Södertälje, locality situated in Södertälje Municipality, Stockholm County,
- Ekeby, Upplands Väsby, locality situated in Upplands Väsby Municipality, Stockholm County
- Ekeby-Almby, locality situated in Örebro Municipality, Örebro County
