= Framnäsviken =

Bay of Stora Värtan in Djursholm, Sweden

Coordinates: 59°24′23″N 18°5′38″E

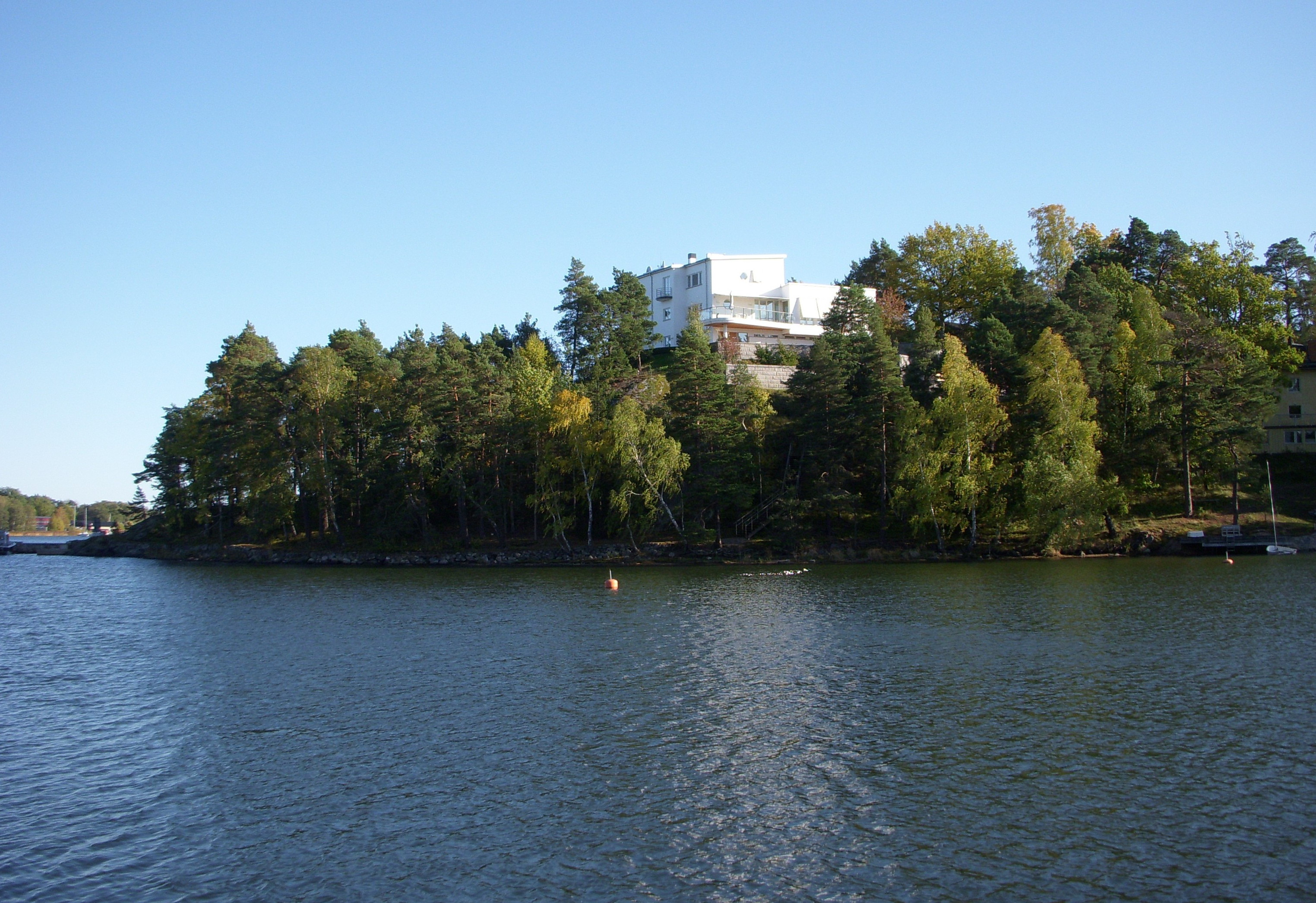
Framnäsviken 2008

Framnäsviken is the name of a small bay of Stora Värtan in Djursholm between the neighbourhoods Germania and Svalnäs.

Until 1976 there was a railway stop here called Djursholms Framnäsviken ("Framnäsviken of Djursholm") at the eastern Djursholmsbanan, a part of Roslagsbanan which was closed that year. Station code: Djf. Originally, this railway stop was the northern end station and goods were reloaded between railway and ship transport here, Framnäsviken at the time being a commercial harbour. The bridge and the old railway bank is now used for pedestrians and bicycles and for skiing in the winter time.
