= Djursholms Restaurant =

Former restaurant in Djursholm, Sweden

Coordinates: 59°23′48.1″N 18°5′24.84″E

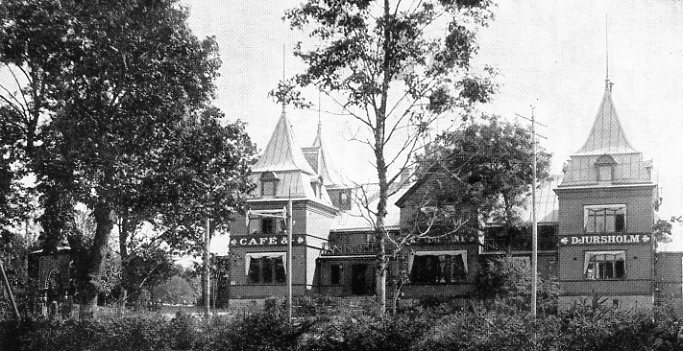
Djursholms Restaurant in the 1890s

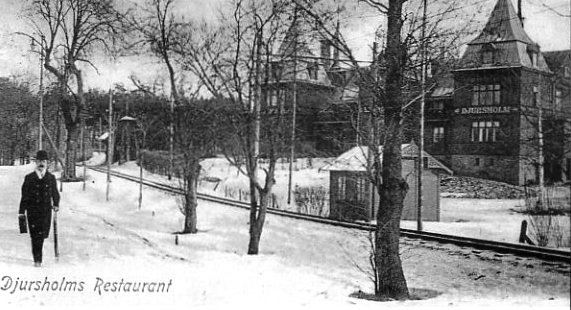
Djursholms restaurant at the railway stop Restauranten. Postcard from ca 1900.

Djursholms Restaurant was a restaurant and meeting hall which, during 1890 to 1956, was a social meeting point in the garden town Djursholm north of Stockholm.

== Origin ==
The restaurant was started by källarmästare Wilhelm Strandberg, who was 25 years old at the time and had experience from Berns salonger in Stockholm, Sweden. The restaurant building was a villa at a property owned by Stockholm-Rimbo Järnvägsaktiebolag in the block Gandvik, close to Samsöviken in Stora Värtan.

August Strindberg lived in Djursholm for a short period 1891–92 and drew up plans for a theatre in the restaurant's large dining room. However, Strandberg still needed the room for the restaurant, so the plans were never realized.

== History ==
The restaurant got a new design in 1895 and another in 1902, both drawn by architect Gustaf Lindgren.

Strandberg left in 1898 to open the restaurant Metropol at Norrmalmstorg. The locations were used for a traditional restaurant, for private and public parties and for municipal meetings.

The restaurant was closed between 1919 and 1921. The railway company then sold to newly founded company Djursholms Restaurangaktiebolag, co-owned by Djursholms AB, the railway company and private investors. This company later changed its name to Fastighetsaktiebolaget Gandvik. For the in August 1922 opening the spot was redesigned. The architect was Victor Fagerström.

== Demise and closing ==
Over time, the restaurant became less prosperous and the social life in Djursholm went through changes. Because of this, the restaurant closed in 1956. The building was burnt down in controlled forms by the fire department in 1963. A new restaurant (Djursholms värdshus) and a family hotel was built at the premises in 1968, designed by architect Bertil Falck at FFNS.

== Railway stop ==
Restauranten was also a name for a railway stop at Djursholmsbanan on the Djursholms Ösby-Eddavägen line. The stop was next to the restaurant and named for it. It was situated at the street Henrik Palmes allé. In 1968, the railway stop was renamed Djursholms torg. The railway line was however disbanded in 1976 and replaced by buses.
