= Galoppfältet railway station =

Railway station in Täby, Sweden

Galoppfältet
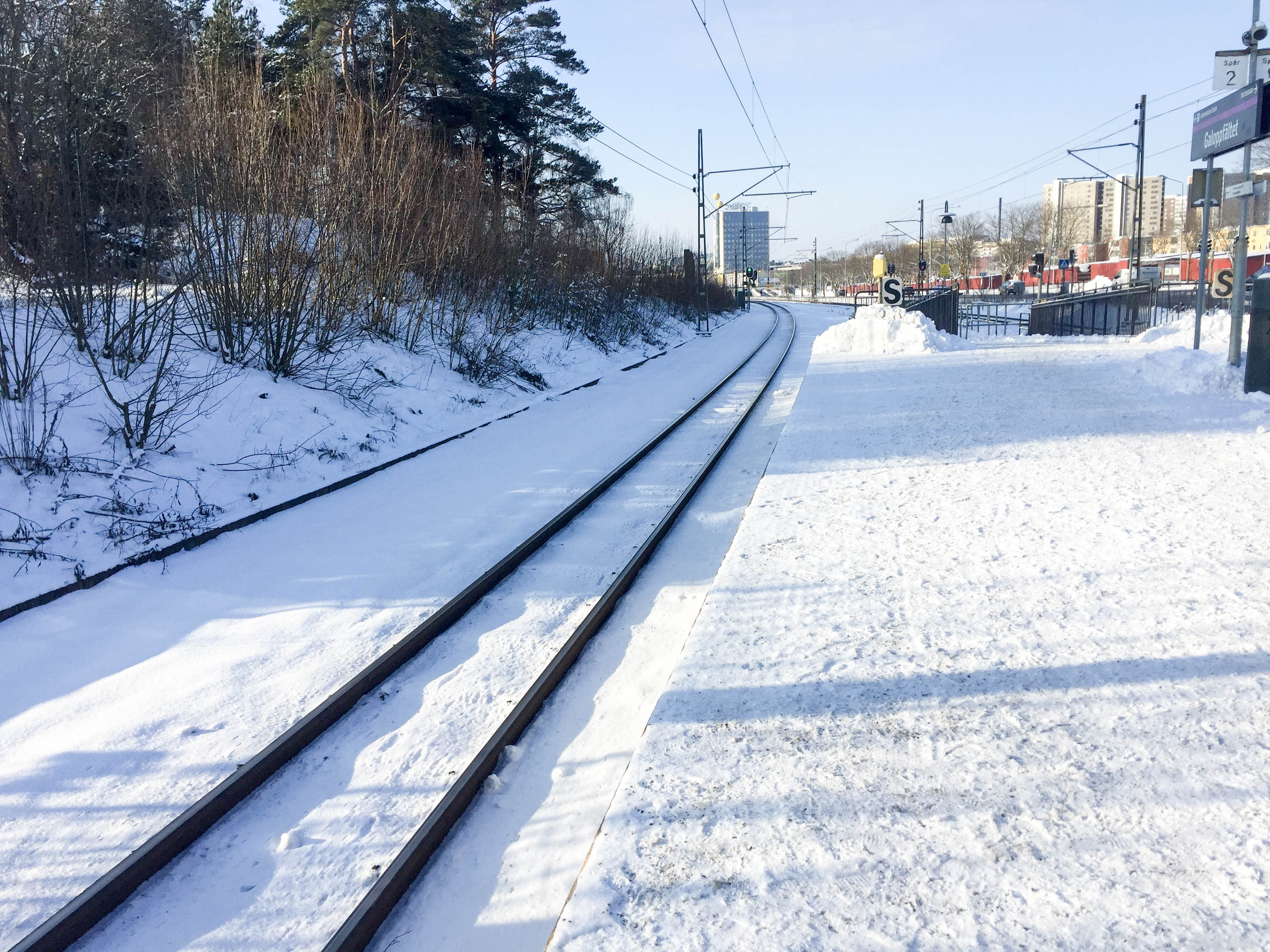

General information
- Location: Täby Municipality; Sweden
- Coordinates: 59°26′49″N 18°5′7″E
- System: Roslagsbanan railway station
- Line: Roslagsbanan
- Platforms: 1 island platform

Construction
- Structure type: At grade
- Accessible: Yes

History
- Opened: 1913

Passengers
- 2019: 1,300 boarding per weekday

Services
Preceding station	SL Local & Light Rail	Following station
Täby centrum towards Stockholms östra	Roslagsbanan Line 28	Viggbyholm towards Österskär
Location

Galoppfältet is a Swedish railway station connected by Roslagsbanan in Täby municipality. Named after the nearby Täby Racecourse (Täby Galopp), the station is located about 13 km from Stockholms östra railway station. It consists of a middle platform with entrances from both sides.

== History ==
The railway stop of Galoppfältet was established in 1913 and was then called Åkerby. Since the establishment of Täby Galoppe Field next to the station, the name was changed in 1960. In 1993, the Roslagsbanan line was improved with double tracks from Roslags Näsby railway station and after the Galoppfältet the line is converted to a single track. In August 2010, the double track was extended until Viggbyholm station.

== Area ==
Within 500m radius of the stop area, a high school and a business park and a large bus garage and a hotel were built. There are several clubs in the area such as Täby Transmitters radio club and two large tenants associations with a total of 1700 apartments and approximately 3,500 inhabitants.

== Projects ==
Täby Galoppe Field is planned to be replaced with a big project for houses and other buildings. This project is expected to increase the significance of the stop. The new district planned in the area has been named Täby park. Whether or not the station will be renamed is not yet decided, but the Galopp Field name may be perceived as misleading in the near future.
