= Roslagsbanan =

Narrow-gauge electrified suburban rail system in Stockholm, Sweden

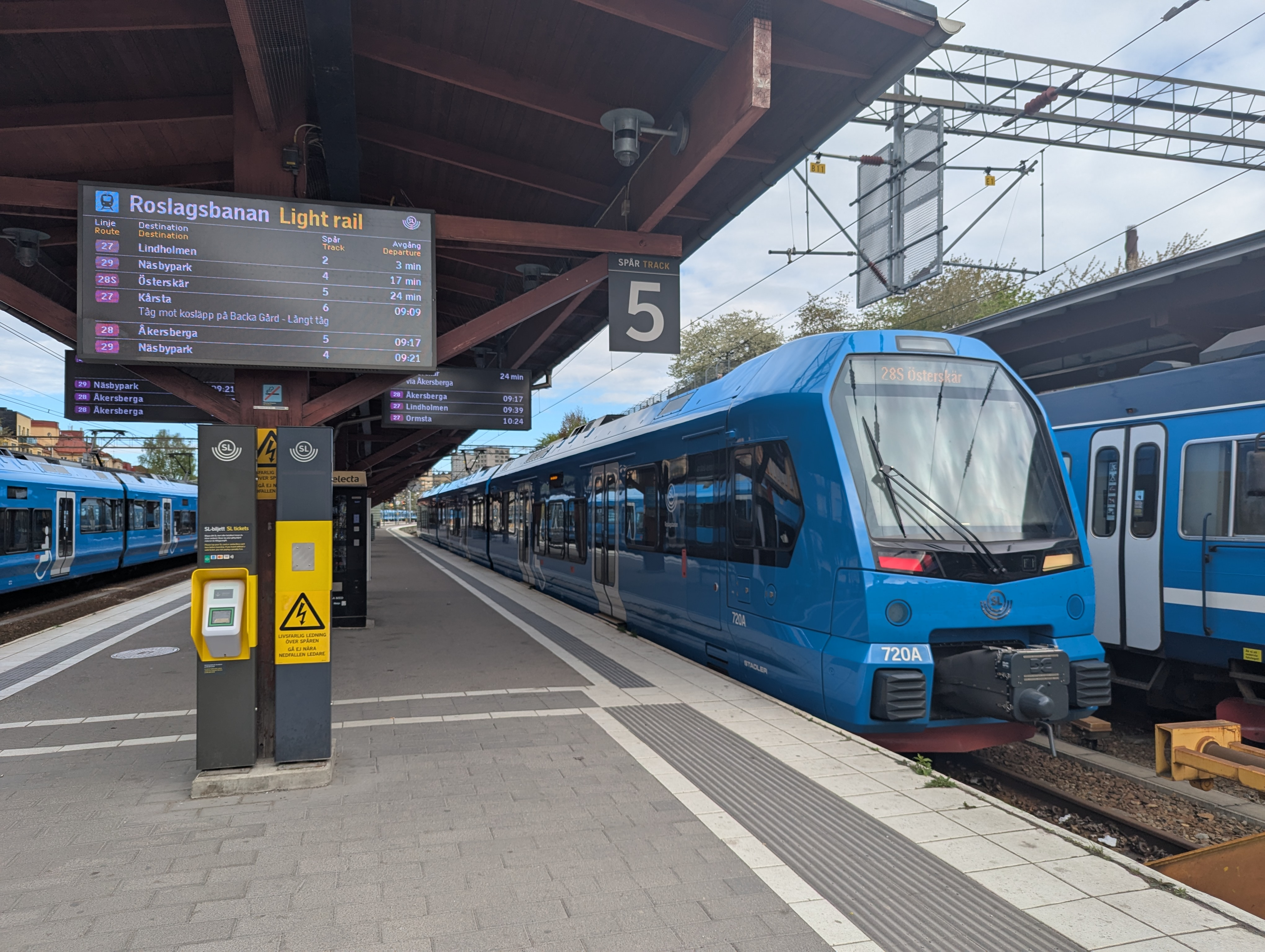
- Trains at Stockholms östra station

Overview
- Native name: Roslagsbanan
- Owner: Storstockholms Lokaltrafik
- Locale: Stockholm County, Sweden
- Termini: Stockholms östra; Näsbypark/Österskär/Kårsta
- Stations: 39

Service
- Type: Narrow-gauge railway, Commuter Rail
- Services: 27 to Kårsta; 28 to Österskär; 29 to Näsbypark
- Operator: Transdev
- Rolling stock: Current: X10p/UBxp/UBp, X15p
- Daily ridership: 53,400 boardings (2019)

History
- Opened: 1885

Technical
- Line length: 65 km (40 mi)
- Num of tracks: 1 or 2
- Track gauge: 891 mm (2 ft 11 3/32 in)
- Electrification: 1,500 V DC from overhead catenary
- Operating speed: 100 km/h (62 mph)
System map
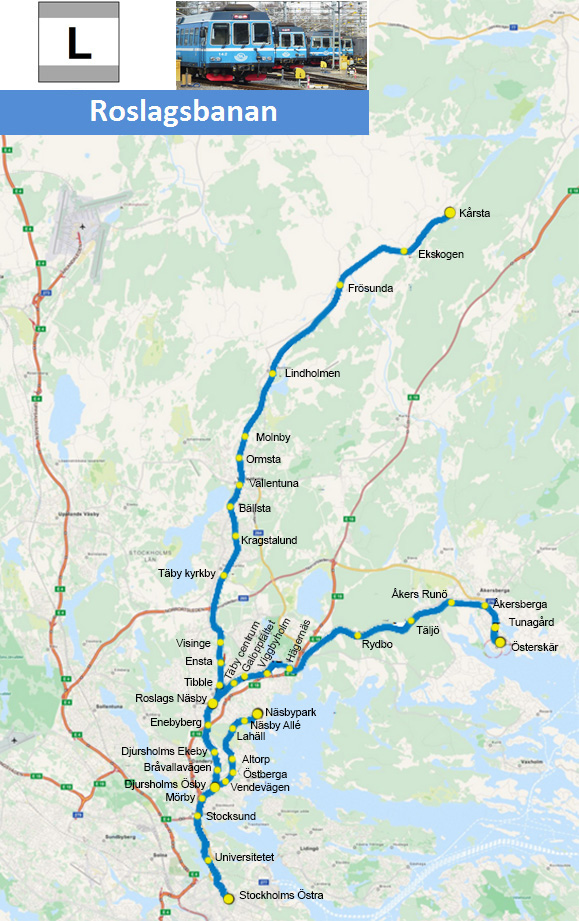

Roslagsbanan (lit. 'the Roslagen Line') is a narrow-gauge suburban rail system serving Stockholm and the Roslagen area of Stockholm County, Sweden. The system has 38 stations and the combined route length is 65 kilometres (40 miles).

It is built to the Swedish three foot (891 mm or 2 ft 11 3/32 in) gauge. Storstockholms Lokaltrafik (SL) classifies it as "light rail" in its maps.

The line starts in Stockholm at Stockholms östra railway station. It goes north and splits into three branch lines at the junction stations Djursholms Ösby and Roslags Näsby; the three branches terminate at Näsbypark, Österskär and Kårsta.

Since 2010, 22 kilometers of track have been upgraded to double track. The 27 and 28 lines now have double tracks to Vallentuna and Viggbyholm stations respectively, along separate sections between Hägernäs and Arninge, and Rydbo and Åkersberga. There are also passing loops at multiple stations throughout the network.

Following a 2017 agreement between the Swedish state, Stockholm County, and the affected municipalities, the line will be extended to the centrally located underground hub T-Centralen, with construction to begin in approximately 2028.

== History ==
The present Roslagsbanan was once just the southern part of a large narrow-gauge system throughout Roslagen and eastern Uppland, connecting Stockholm and Uppsala with ports, smaller towns and parts of the countryside and used for both freight and passenger transport.

In 1885 the line from Stockholms östra railway station to Rimbo was opened, today the longest branch of Roslagsbanan although the northernmost part between Kårsta and Rimbo has been shut down. It was originally built and operated by the private enterprise Stockholm-Rimbo Järnväg (SRJ). In 1909 SRJ changed its name to Stockholm–Roslagens Järnvägar (with the same abbreviation) following the take-over of companies running adjacent lines.

Roslagsbanan is one of the oldest electrified railway lines for public transport in Europe. The first Stockholm–Djursholm suburban section, Djursholmsbanan, was electrified in 1892, and at the time continued into the city center by way of the tram network, ending at Engelbrektsplan next to Humlegården.

In the beginning of the 20th century and well into the 1950s, Djursholms Ösby, a branch station on Roslagsbanan, was one of the busiest railway stations in Sweden with trains stopping every three minutes with three different branches dividing from there, transporting people and goods.

In the years following World War II, more and more of Swedish railways were nationalised through Statens Järnvägar (SJ), a fate also shared by Roslagsbanan. In 1969 Stockholm County took control over the Stockholm–Rimbo network (now referred to as 'Roslagsbanan') from SJ with the public transport company SL managing the railway.

In 1960 the Djursholmsbanan tracks to Engelbrektsplan were closed, making Stockholms östra railway station the system's terminus, thus passengers wishing to travel on with the Stockholm Metro have had to transfer to the adjacent Tekniska högskolan metro station since 1973. One of the two Djursholm branches (Eddavägslinjen) was closed by SL in 1976.

When SL took over the railway it had many problems. It was narrow-gauge and not connected to the rest of the rail network in any way. It was slow, being outperformed by buses, especially to the areas near the end of line, and it was mostly single-track and had low capacity. Because of this there was a strong political interest to close the railway and replace it with buses and a metro line to Täby. The public opinion was much against this and after a referendum in 1980 the county decided to save the Roslagsbanan and invest in new trains and modernize the infrastructure and formed a new company SLJ to run Roslagsbanan. Despite this the northernmost portion, Kårsta–Rimbo was closed in 1981, and the plan was to close the part Lindholmen–Kårsta as well, but it was temporarily kept due to the poor roads in the area which would be problematic for bus transport. Even though the roads have been improved the line to Kårsta is still in use today and there are currently no plans to close it. In January 2010 the Frescati station was closed to avoid congestion and the Universitetet station was moved 500 metres (550 yards) north to better serve Stockholm University.

== Ownership and present use ==
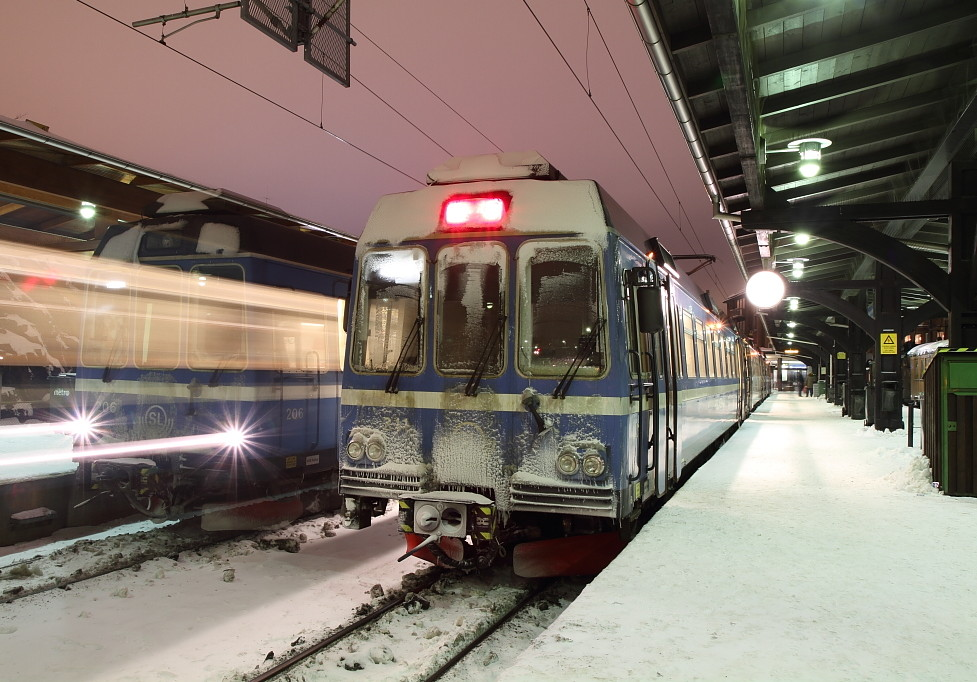
At Stockholms östra in winter

The railway, owned by the Stockholm County Council through the public transport company Storstockholms Lokaltrafik (SL), is not part of the nationally owned network. It is the only narrow-gauge railway in Sweden still in use for commercial traffic.

Roslagsbanan is part of the Stockholm public transport system. It is operated under contract by Transdev Sverige AB from 15 April 2022. Transdev took over operations from Arriva Sverige who had operated the network since 7 January 2013. Arriva Sverige in turn took over took over from the previous contracted company Roslagståg AB, which was a joint venture by the Danish DSB and Tågkompaniet.

Despite its age and non-standard gauge, it is one of the most used railways in Sweden. Since the late 1980s, the railway has constantly but slowly been upgraded to a modern standard with modernised rolling stock, higher platforms and straighter and double tracks allowing for increased speeds and more departures.

There are 15 departures to and from Stockholms östra during the morning and evening peak hours respectively. In 2019, the railway had a ridership of 53,400 boardings per day.

== Future ==
Roslagsbanan is to be diverted to a new terminus at T-Centralen via a new tunnel from Universitetet station to Odenplan commuter rail station and metro station, and then parallel to the Stockholm City Line. This will allow passengers to commute faster within the city, as T-Centralen is served by all lines of the Stockholm Metro, all lines of the Stockholm Commuter Rail, as well as Spårväg City and is connected to Stockholm Central Station. When the extension is completed, Stockholms östra will become obsolete and close down. The stretch of track from Universitetet to the old terminus will be dismantled to make way for 500 apartments. The line will gain much more importance, and a further 1,500 flats are planned to be built along the line in Täby and Vallentuna municipalities, aiming to ease the ongoing housing crisis in Stockholm. The project is estimated to cost 12 billion kronor. Construction of work tunnels is estimated to start in 2028, while the construction of the railway tunnels will start 2030. Service is currently estimated to start in 2038.

A feasibility study into extending the Roslagsbanan to Arlanda Airport was completed in 2010, followed by a public consultation in 2012.

== Network ==
Roslagsbanan is now used by Storstockholms Lokaltrafik (SL) for commuter transport. The present network comprises most of the southern part of what was once a much bigger network, made up of privately owned railways all over Roslagen, connecting Stockholm and Uppsala with the countryside and used for passenger and freight trains. See the § History section of this article.

| Line | Route | Length | Stations | Map | Notes |
|---|---|---|---|---|---|
| 27 | Stockholms östra – Djursholms Ösby – Roslags Näsby – Vallentuna – Lindholmen – Kårsta | 41.5 km (25.8 mi) | 23 | | Opened 1885 |
| 28 | Stockholms östra – Djursholms Ösby – Roslags Näsby – Åkersberga – Österskär | 29.5 km (18.3 mi) | 20 | | Opened 1901 to Åkersberga, 1906 to Österskär |
| 29 | Stockholms östra – Djursholms Ösby – Lahäll – Näsbypark | 11.5 km (7.1 mi) | 12 | | Opened 1928 to Lahäll and 1937 to Näsbypark |
| Total | | 65 km (40 mi) | 39 | | |

The line are only displayed on some trains; others only have the destination displayed.

In the timetables of Samtrafiken, the lines do not have the numbers as stated above, but the numbers 121 for the line to Kårsta, 122 for the line to Österskär and 123 for the line to Näsbypark.

=== Current networks previously connected to Roslagsbanan ===
Some of the northern parts of the once bigger network are still in use, but these are not formally called Roslagsbanan. These two parts are

- Uppsala–Länna–Faringe (opened in 1876 to Länna, 1885 to Faringe); Tourist traffic only, see Upsala-Lenna Jernväg.
- Dannemora–Gimo–Hargshamn–Hallstavik (Opened 1878; Dannemora–Hargshamn turned to normal gauge in the 1970s and extended into Hallstavik 1977; SJ freight only).

=== Closed parts of Roslagsbanan (south of Rimbo) ===
- Stocksund – Långängen (1915-standard–gauge tram) line, then converted to narrow gauge in 1934, closed in 1966)
- Stockholms östra– Engelbrektsplan (1895–1960)
- Djursholms Ösby – Eddavägen (1890–1977)
- Kårsta – Rimbo (1885–1981)

== Stations ==
| Section | Station | km | Opened | Closed |
|---|---|---|---|---|
| Kårsta (Rimbo) branch | Rimbo | 56 | 1884 | 1981 |
| Kårsta (Rimbo) branch | Rö | 50 | 1885 | 1981 |
| Kårsta (Rimbo) branch | Sparren | 48 | 1885 | 1981 |
| Kårsta (Rimbo) branch | Kårsta | 41.7 | 1885 | |
| Kårsta (Rimbo) branch | Ekskogen | 38.5 | 1885 | |
| Kårsta (Rimbo) branch | Frösunda | 34.6 | 1885 | |
| Kårsta (Rimbo) branch | Lindholmen | 28.8 | 1885 | |
| Kårsta (Rimbo) branch | Molnby | 25.5 | 1885 | |
| Kårsta (Rimbo) branch | Ormsta | 24.1 | | |
| Kårsta (Rimbo) branch | Vallentuna | 22.7 | 1885 | |
| Kårsta (Rimbo) branch | Bällsta | 21.5 | | |
| Kårsta (Rimbo) branch | Kragstalund | 19.9 | 1993 | |
| Kårsta (Rimbo) branch | Byle | 19.0 | 1910 | 1993 |
| Kårsta (Rimbo) branch | Täby kyrkby | 18.8 | 1885 | |
| Kårsta (Rimbo) branch | Visinge | 14.2 | 1986 | |
| Kårsta (Rimbo) branch | Ensta | 13.2 | 1911 | |
| Kårsta (Rimbo) branch | Tibble | 11.9 | | |
| Österskär branch | Österskär | 29.4 | 1906 | |
| Österskär branch | Tunagård | 28.6 | 1919 | |
| Österskär branch | Åkersberga | 27.2 | 1901 | |
| Österskär branch | Åkers Runö | 25.5 | 1901 | |
| Österskär branch | Täljö | 23.2 | 1928 | |
| Österskär branch | Rydbo | 20.2 | 1901 | |
| Österskär branch | Arninge | 17.2 | 2021 | |
| Österskär branch | Hägernäs | 15.6 | | |
| Österskär branch | Viggbyholm | 14.3 | 1907 | |
| Österskär branch | Galoppfältet | 13.1 | 1913 | |
| Österskär branch | Täby Centrum | 12.5 | 1968 | |
| Main line | Roslags Näsby | 11.0 | 1885 | |
| Main line | Enebyberg | 9.9 | 1909 | |
| Main line | Djursholms Ekeby | 8.3 | 1885 | |
| Main line | Bråvallavägen | 7.4 | | |
| Näsbypark branch | Näsbypark | 11.7 | 1937 | |
| Näsbypark branch | Näsbyallé | 11.0 | 1937 | |
| Näsbypark branch | Lahäll | 10.2 | 1928 | |
| Näsbypark branch | Altorp | 8.5 | | |
| Näsbypark branch | Östberga | 7.8 | 1910 | |
| Näsbypark branch | Vendevägen | 7.2 | 1910 | |
| Svalnäs branch (closed) | Svalnäs | 12.9 | 1912 | 1933 |
| Svalnäs branch (closed) | Eddavägen | 12.1 | 1901 | 1976 |
| Svalnäs branch (closed) | Vikingavägen | 10.7 | 1901 | 1976 |
| Svalnäs branch (closed) | Djursholms Framnäsviken | 9.9 | 1890 | 1976 |
| Svalnäs branch (closed) | Germania | 9.5 | 1890 | 1976 |
| Svalnäs branch (closed) | Restauranten | 8.7 | 1890 | 1976 |
| Svalnäs branch (closed) | Djursholms Sveavägen | 8.3 | 1890 | 1976 |
| Svalnäs branch (closed) | Bragevägen | 7.5 | 1890 | 1976 |
| Main line | Djursholms Ösby | 6.7 | 1890 | |
| Main line | Mörby | 5.6 | 1906 | |
| Main line | Stocksund (new) | 4.6 | 1996 | |
| Långängen branch (closed) | Långängen | | 1911 | 1966 |
| Långängen branch (closed) | Stockby | | 1911 | 1966 |
| Långängen branch (closed) | Stocksund (original) | 4.5 | 1885 | 1996 |
| Main line | Ålkistan | 3.5 | 1885 | 1923 |
| Main line | Freskati | 3.0 | 1885 | 2009 |
| Main line | Universitetet (new) | 2.5 | 2010 | |
| Main line | Universitetet (original) | 1.7 | | 2009 |
| Main line | Stockholms östra | 0.0 | 1885 | |
| Main line | Engelbrektsplan | 1 | 1895 | 1960 |

== Rolling stock ==
=== X10p ===
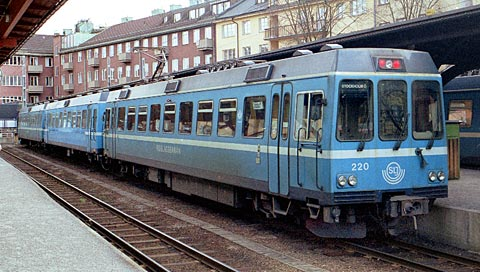
X10p at Stockholms östra railway station with UBp and UBxp in 2007

The present train sets were manufactured by ABB Railcar (now Bombardier) and delivered in 1988–1995. The train sets are owned by SL, but maintained and operated by Transdev. After refurbishment until 2016, it is planned to keep them in service at least until 2025.

The trains are made up of three different bogie vehicle types:

- Motor coach X10p Number of vehicles: 35, Seating capacity: 72, Length: 19.9 metres (65 ft 3 in), Weight: 27.7 tonnes (27.3 long tons; 30.5 short tons), Power rating: 400 kW (540 hp), Maximum speed: 80 km/h (50 mph)
- Driving trailer UBxp Number of vehicles: 34, Seating capacity: 76, Length: 19.9 metres (65 ft 3 in), Weight: 16.3 tonnes (16 long tons; 18 short tons)
- Intermediate trailer UBp Number of vehicles: 32, Seating capacity: 80, Length: 19.9 metres (65 ft 3 in), Weight: 16 tonnes (15.7 long tons; 17.6 short tons)

The trains were completely refurbished in 2012–2016 with new seatings, LED illumination, and electronic destination displays. The intermediate carriages were rebuilt with low floors, enabling wheelchair and pram access, but reducing seats from 80 down to 66 including some folding seats next to the new and wider doors. The refurbishment also included the exterior painting, where the surrounding white stripe is lower now.

The other problem with the old rolling stock: the trains are also very noisy, especially considering the railway mostly goes through built up suburban areas. The SL experimented with shrouds ("skirts") around the wheels between spring 2008 and spring 2010 to reduce noise. However, the attempt did not turn out well because the covers hit support rails. Instead, it was decided to build noise barriers of reinforced concrete, which today can be found along several stretches that pass through densely built-up areas, including Djursholm and Österskär.

=== X15p ===
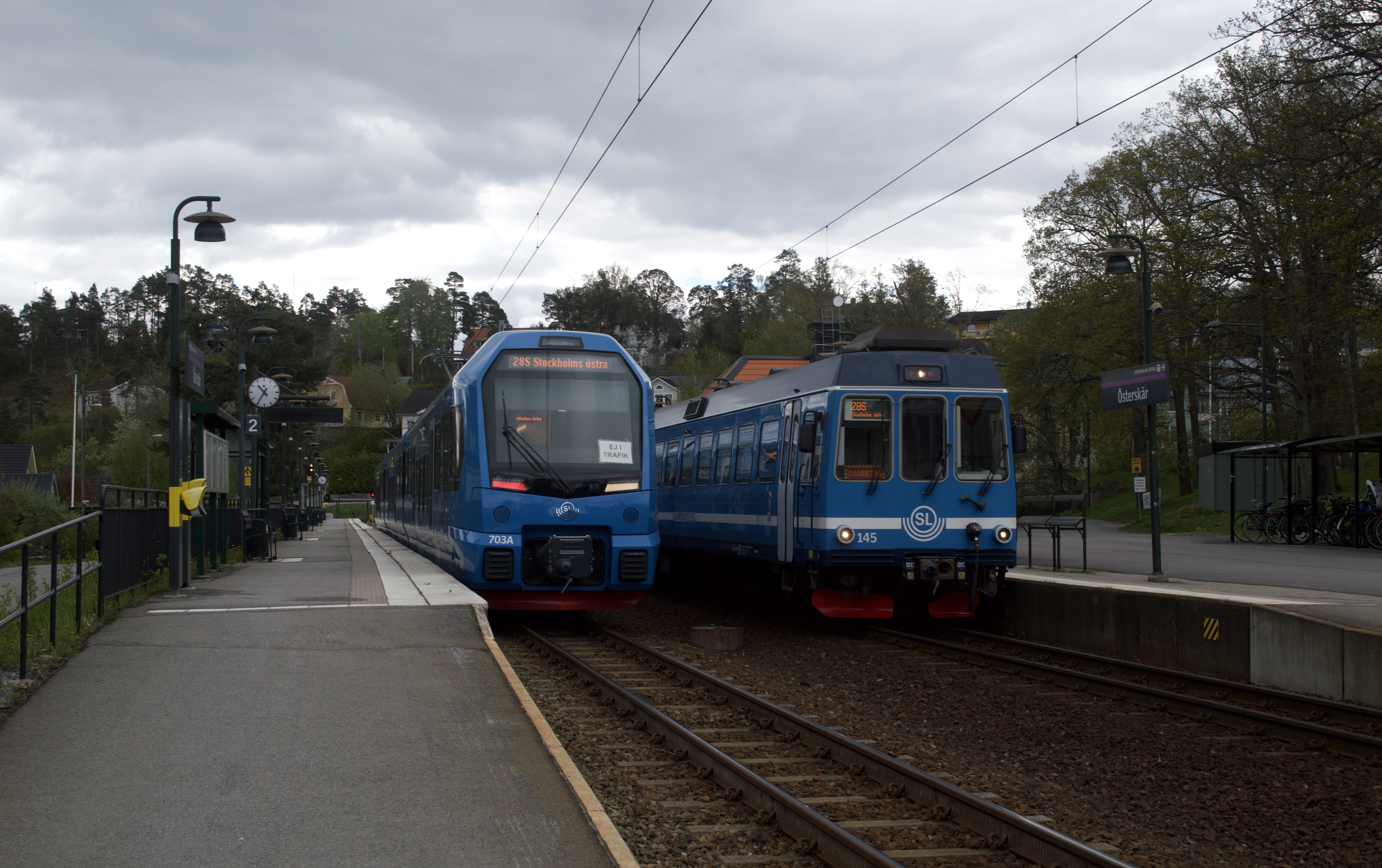
New X15p (left) and refurbished X10p 145 at Österskär in 2022

In addition, in 2010 SL began the process of finding a company from which to order modern, less noisy and less vibrating trains to meet the rising demand for departures on Roslagsbanan and reduce the impact on the surrounding population. 22 new trains were ordered from Stadler Rail in August 2016 with an option for a further 45 more. The new EMU type is named X15p, with a new depot, Vallentunadepån, having been built just north of Vallentuna in 2020. The trains are designed for a speed of 120 km/h (75 mph) and can accommodate 312 passengers, with seating for 162. Although the top speed in revenue service is set to 100 km/h. The EMU is equipped with multiple-unit train control and will run in a triple-train configuration in the future, after all platforms have been extended to 180 metres (590 ft 7 in). The first vehicle was delivered to Sweden in October 2020 and used for extensive test drives between Lindholmen and Kårsta from February to summer 2021 during evenings. The first train entered service on 31 October 2023. Four trains were re-ordered at the beginning of 2022.

=== Older trains ===
The trains which were still in use until the early 1990s contained some vehicles dating from near the beginning of the 20th century. Some of these old brown and wooden wagons have been saved, the oldest ones being from 1914. They are owned by Spårvägsmuseet (Stockholm Tramway Museum) and are managed by Roslagsbanans Veterantågsförening (RBV) ("the Veteran Train Club for Roslagsbanan"), and can be chartered for events.

Some old trains have also been sold to other Swedish three foot gauge railways, which are now only heritage railways, where they are used for tourists.

== Gallery ==
=== Present day ===
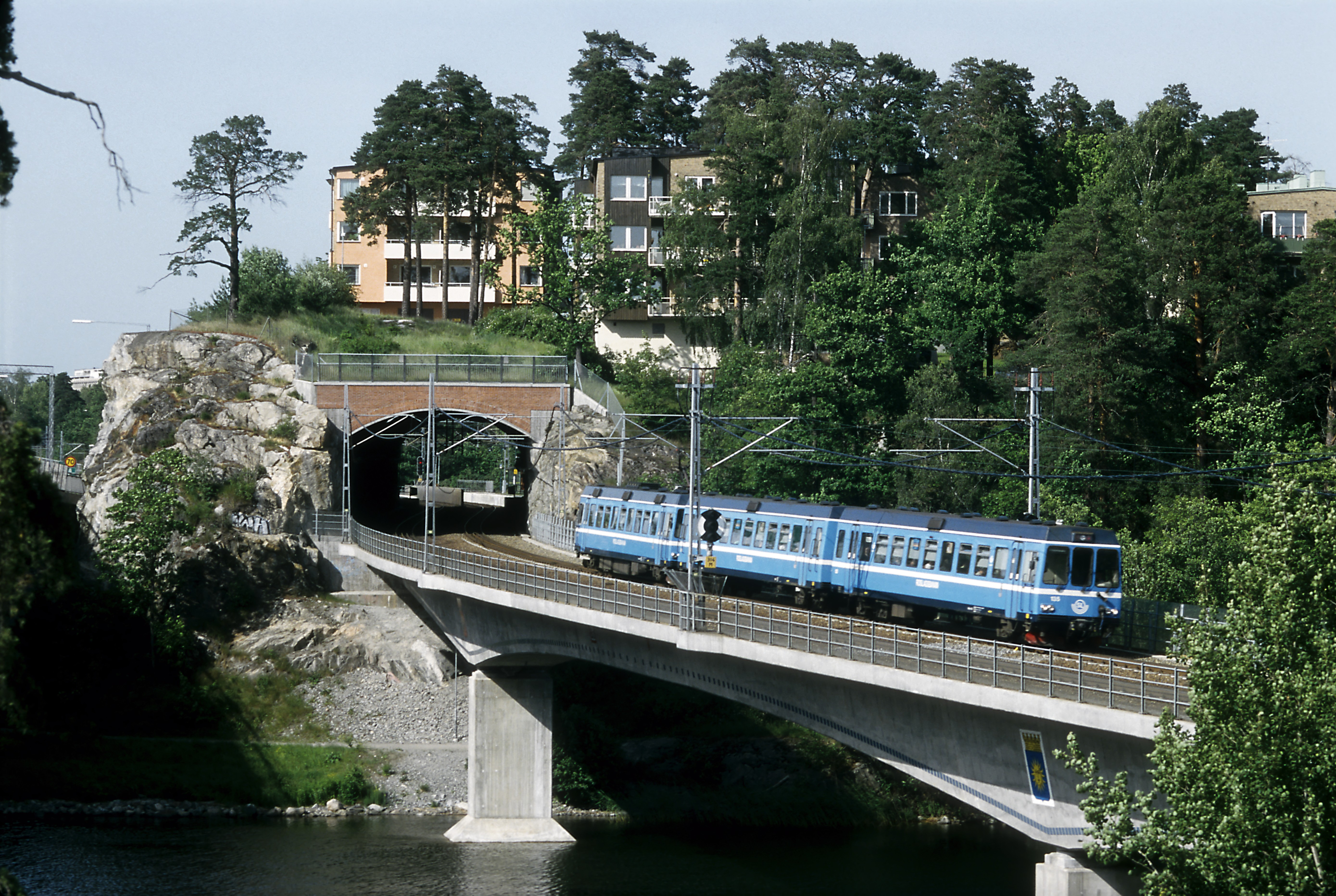
New bridge of Stocksund, inaugurated in 1996, with the new station on the other side of the tunnel

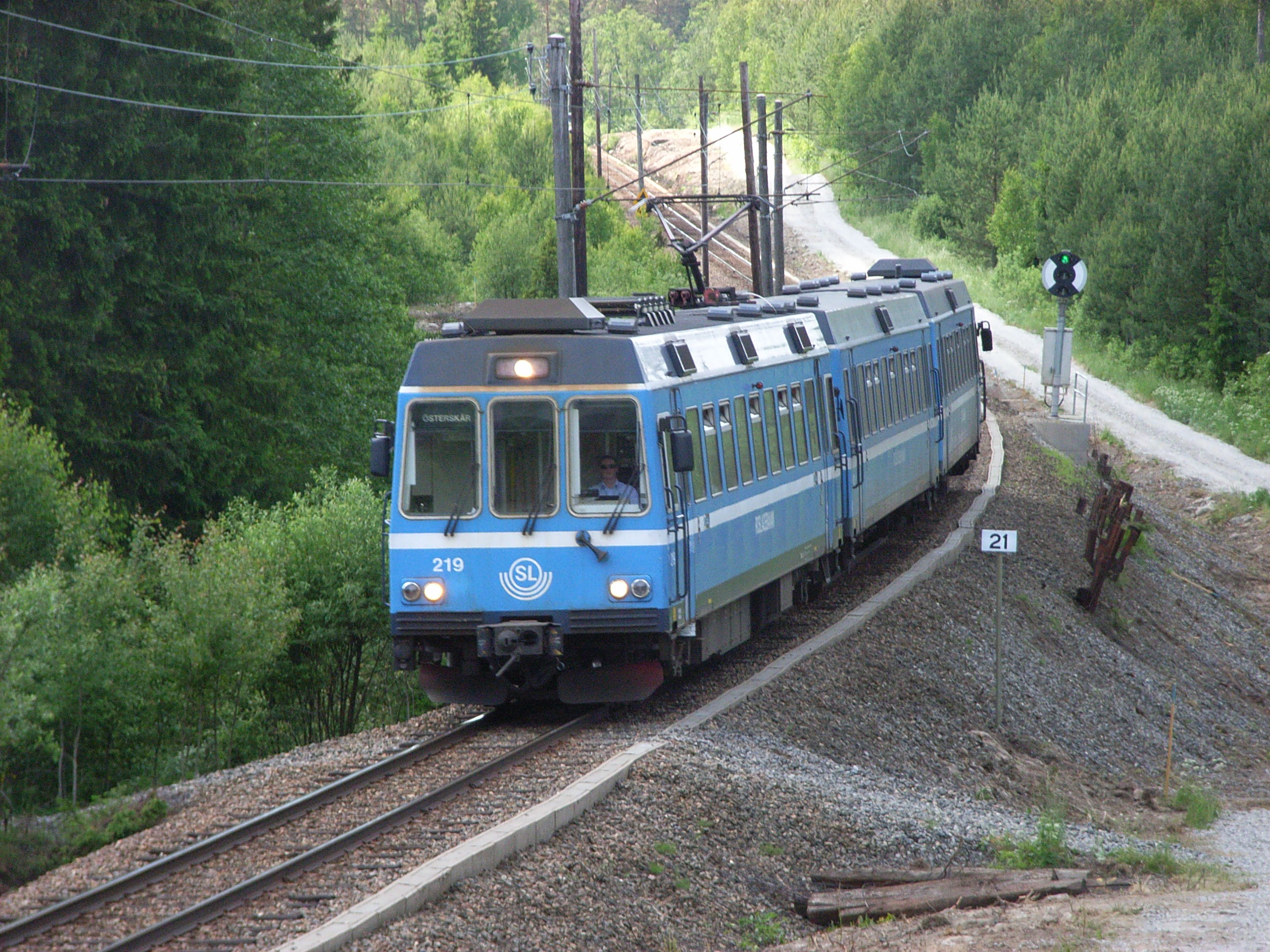
Train at Rydbo

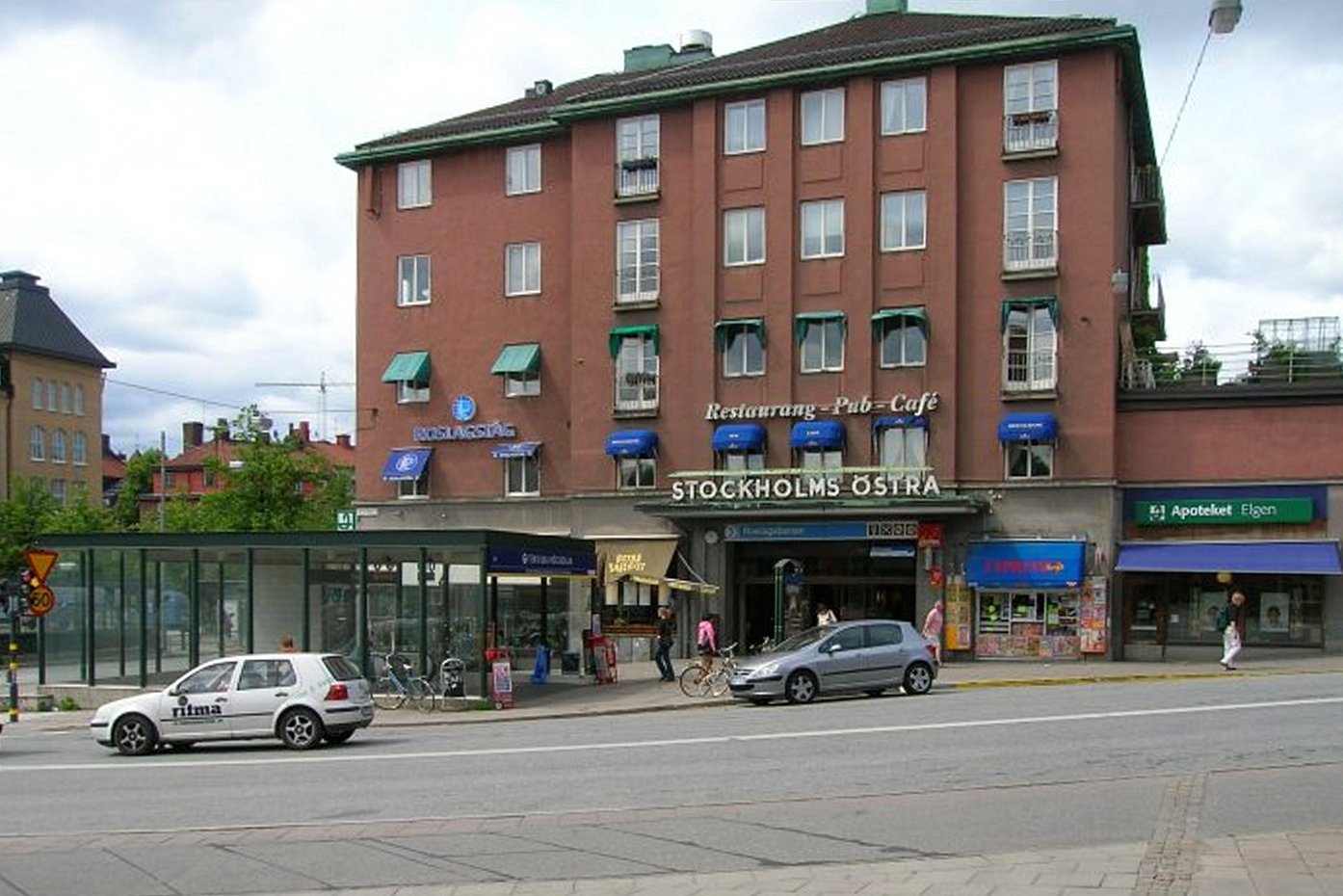
The red building of Stockholms östra railway station and the entrance to the Stockholm Metro in front of it to the left

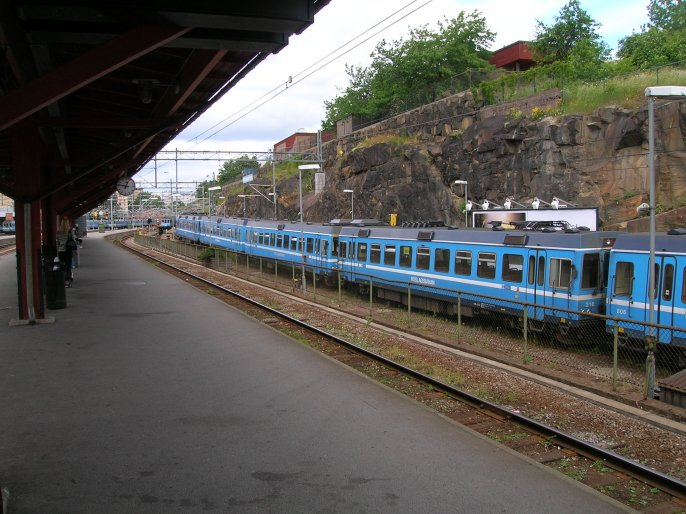
Platforms at Stockholms östra railway station

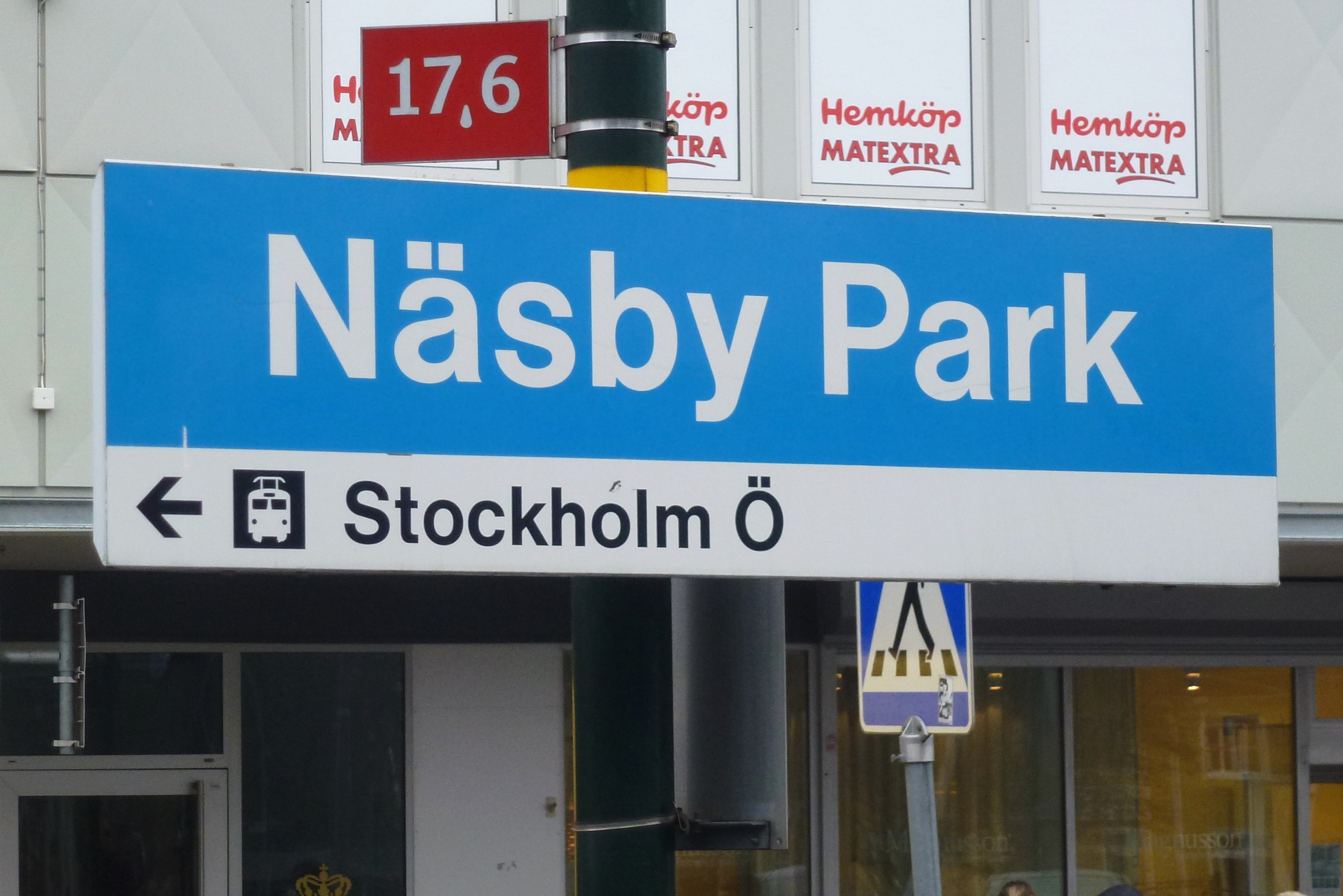
Näsby Park is one of the four systems termini.

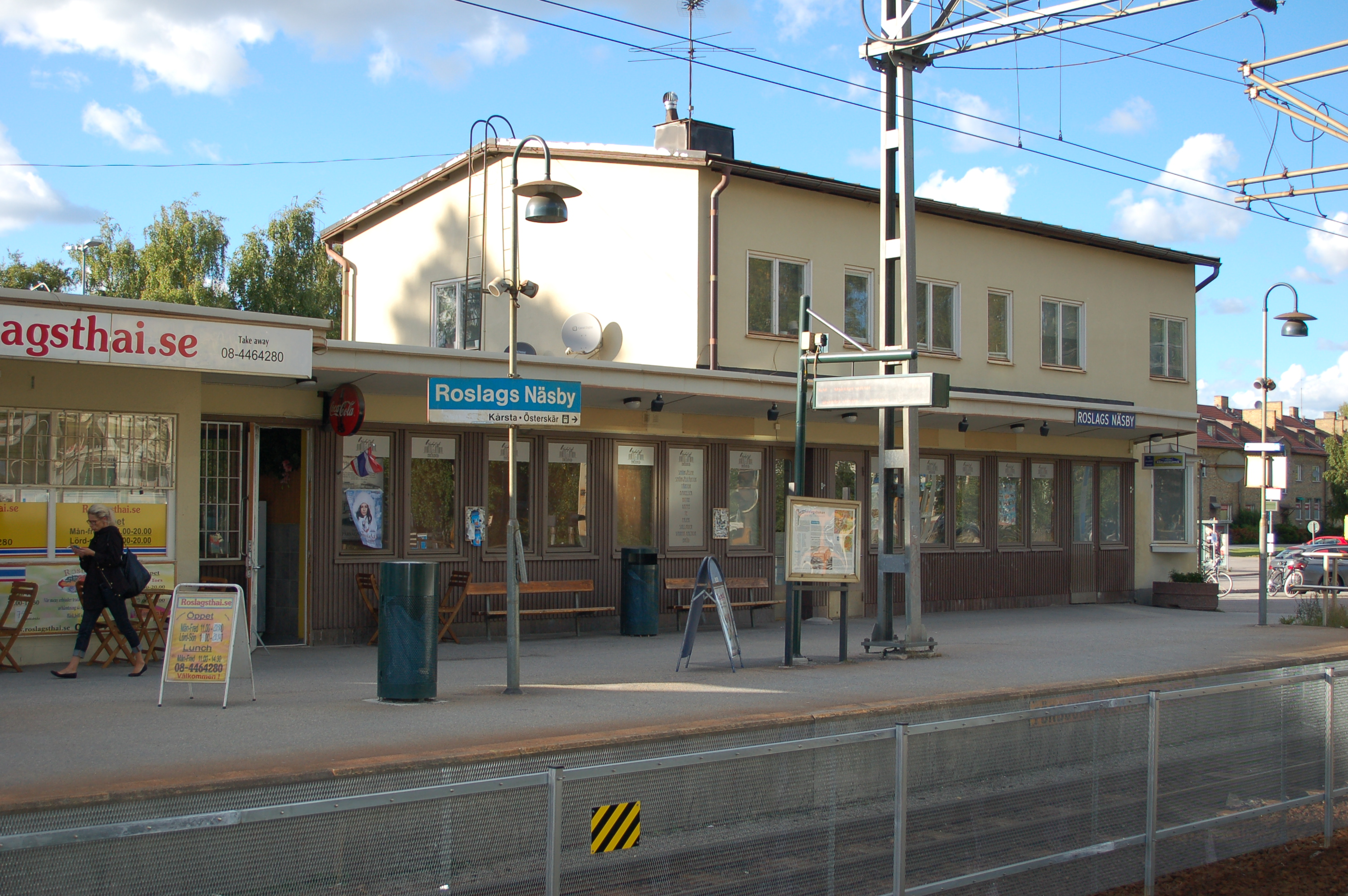
Roslags Näsby is, together with Stockholms östra railway station and Djursholms Ösby one of the three junctions of the system.

=== Historical ===
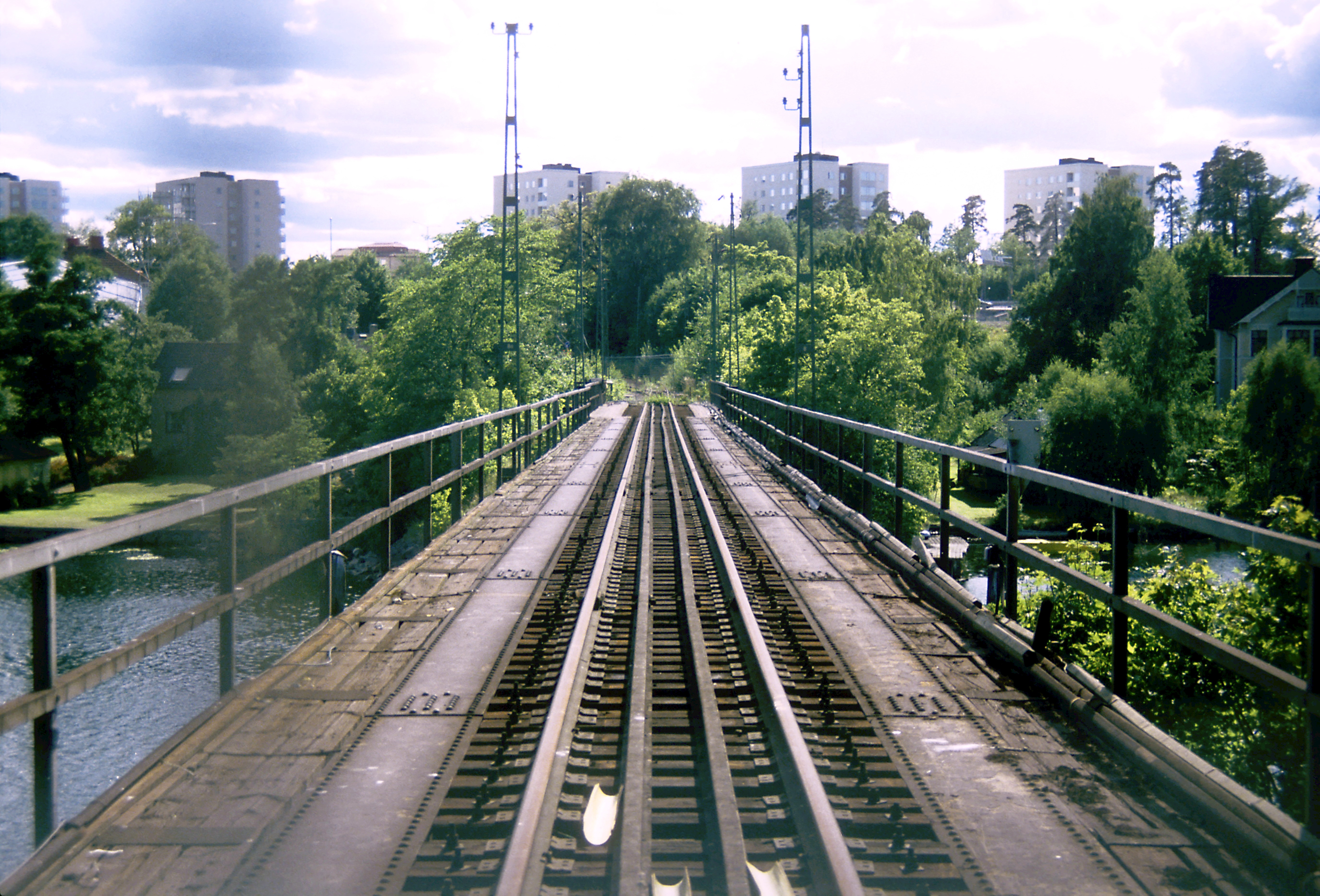
Old bridge of Stocksund with the swing span visible in the end, during dismantling in 1997

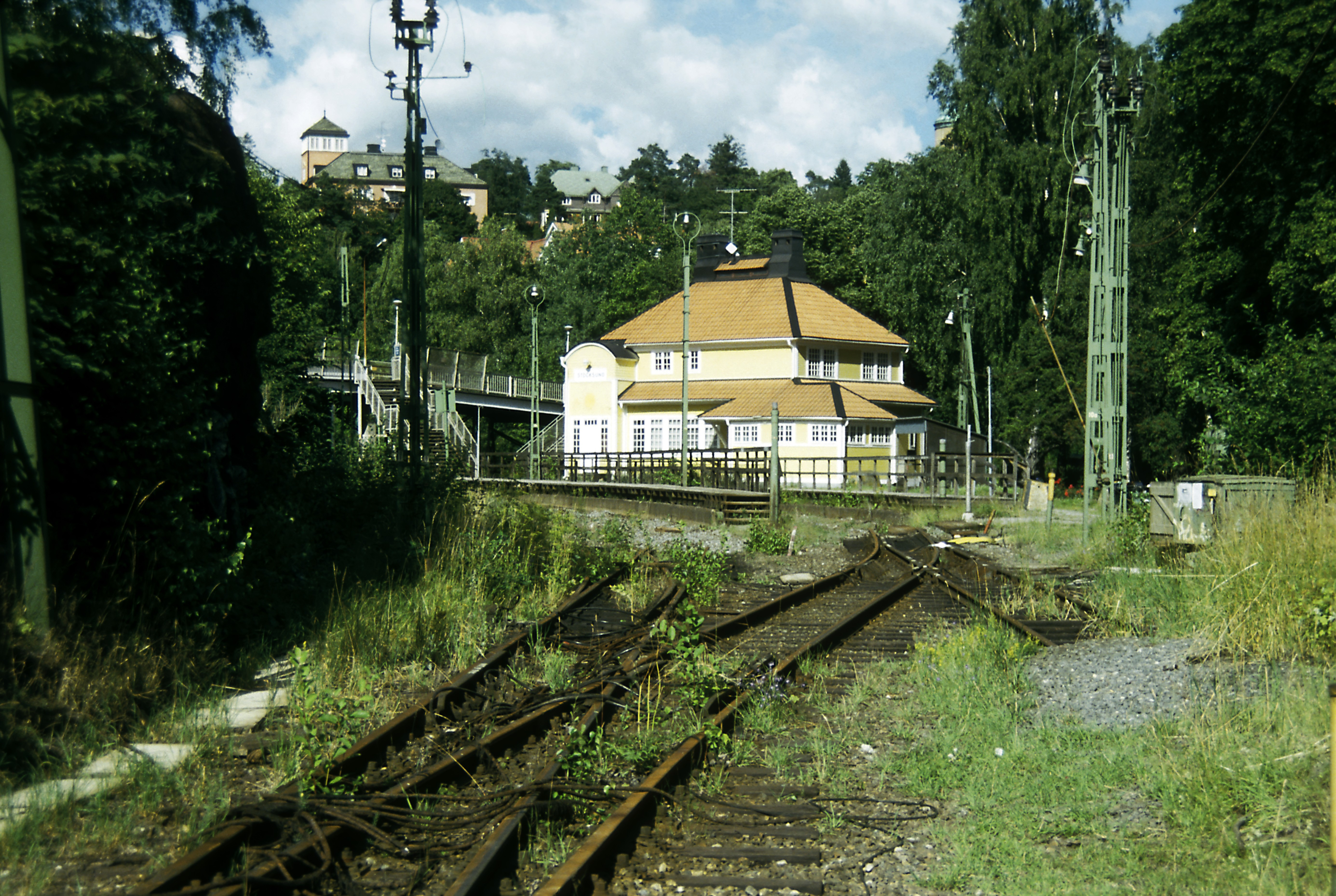
Old station of Stocksund, now replaced with a station some hundred metres to the north-west, where the rails go straighter allowing for higher speed

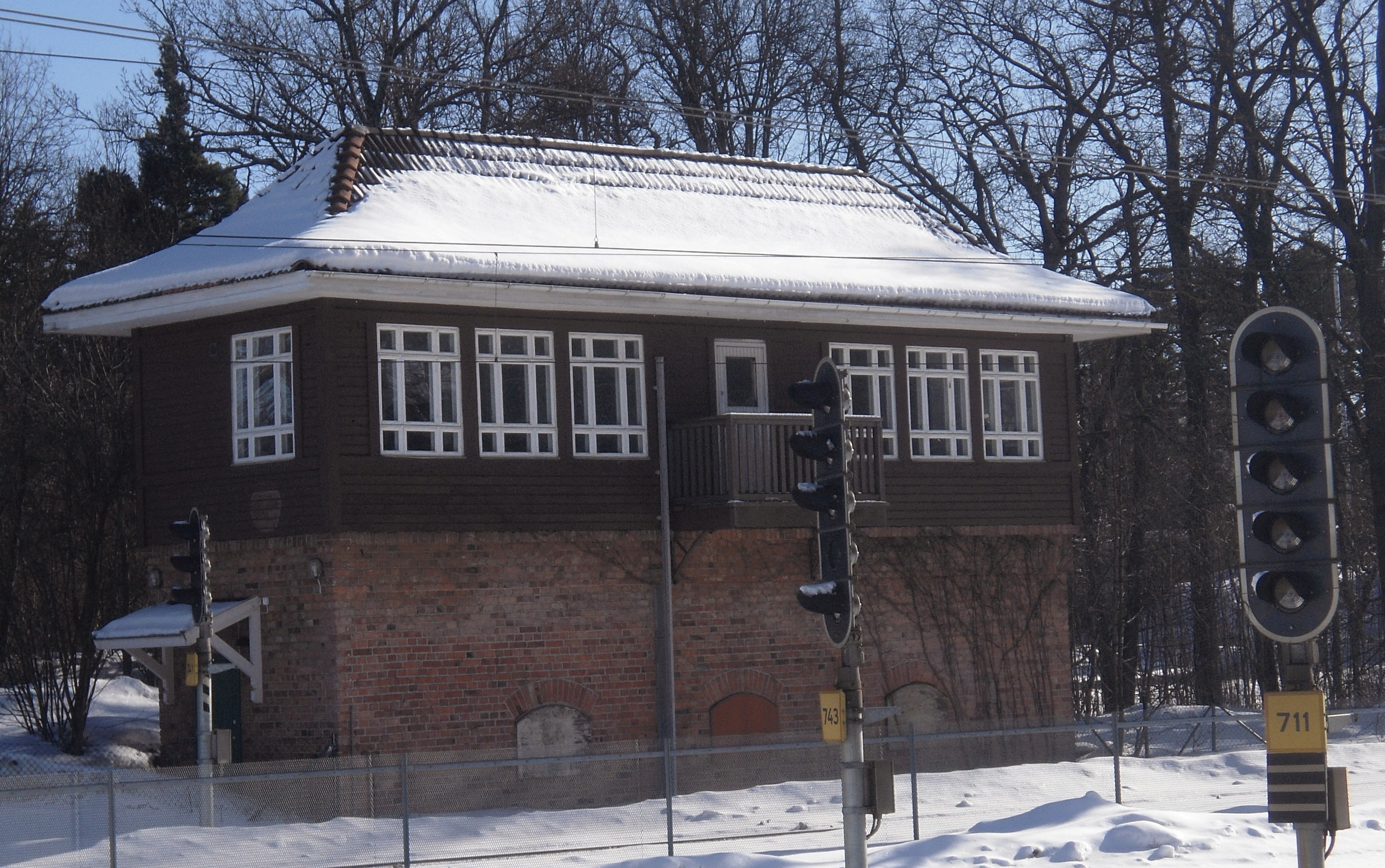
Old signal box at Djursholms Ösby

== See also ==
- History of rail transport in Sweden
- Public transport in Stockholm
- Rail transport in Sweden
