= Bragevägen railway station =

Coordinates: 59.3960°N 18.0732°E

Bragevägen railway station used to be a railway station of the Djursholmsbanan, a part of the Roslagsbanan which was discontinued in 1976. The station was situated at the intersection of Bragevägen and Valevägen in Djursholm, next to Djursholms församlingsgård. When coming from Stockholm Ö, it was the first stop after Djursholms Ösby and was followed by Djursholms Sveavägen.

Station code: Bvg
