= Germania, Djursholm =

Part of Djursholm in Danderyd Municipality, Sweden

Coordinates: 59°23′57″N 18°5′46″E

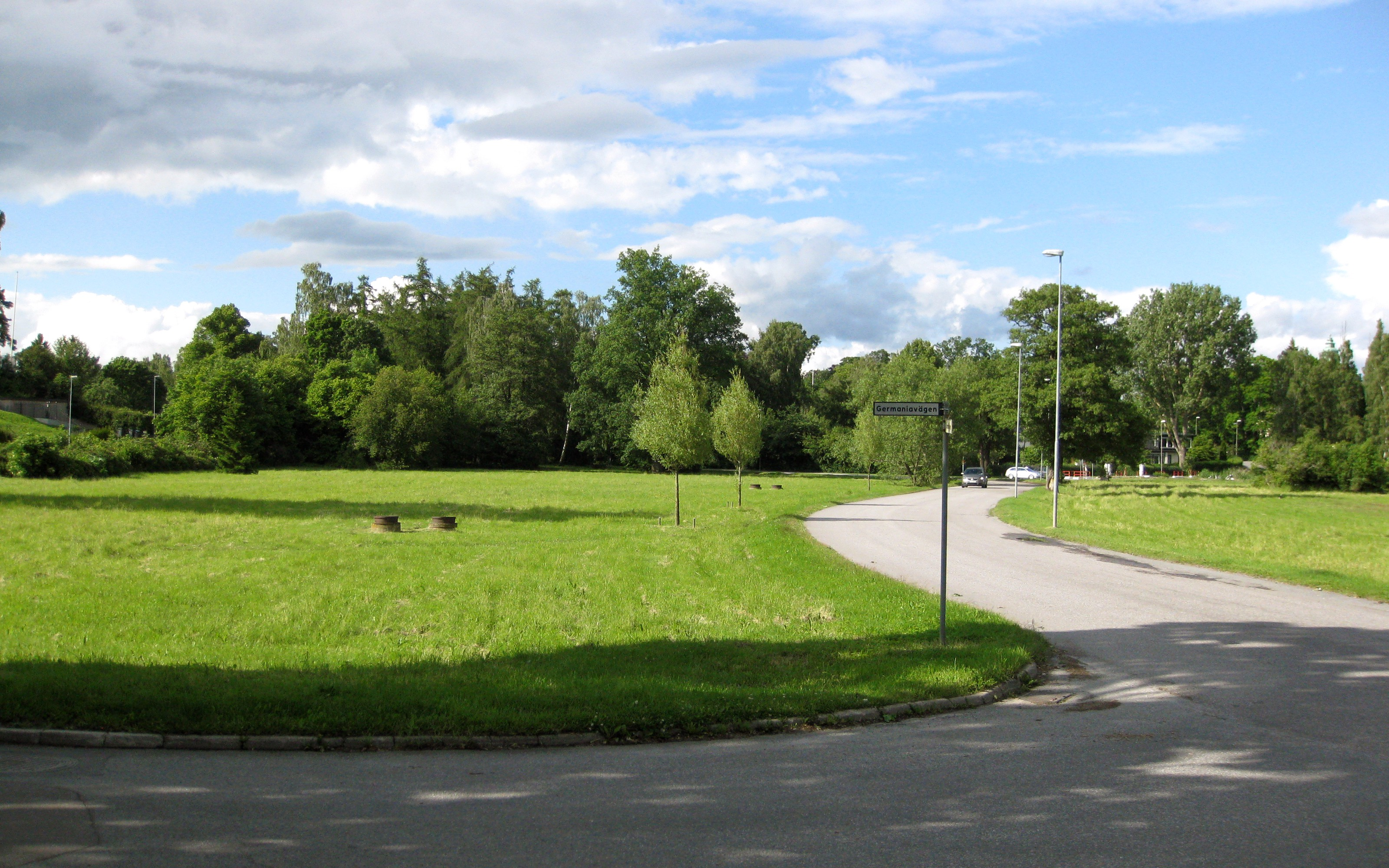
Germaniaparken.

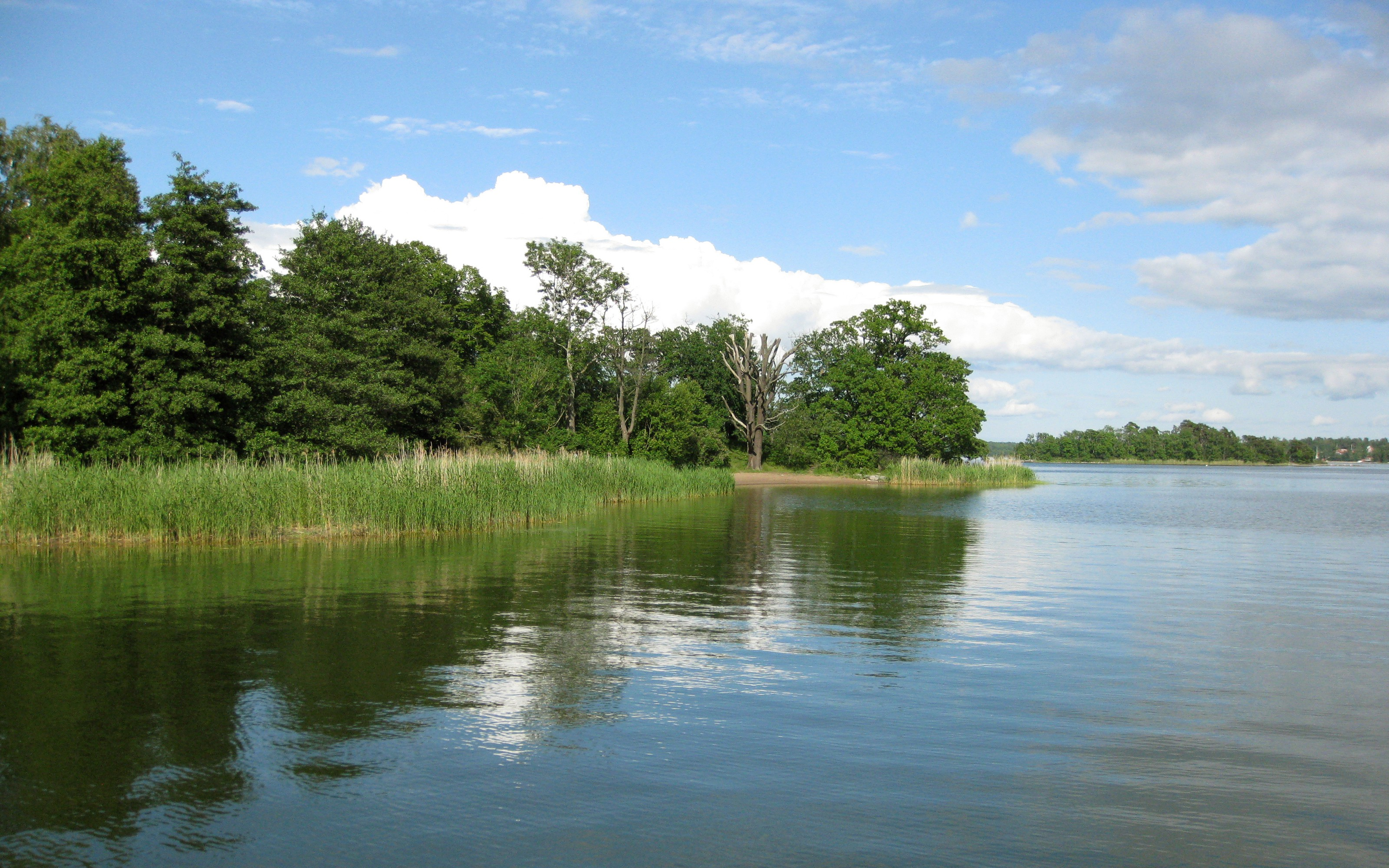
Germaniaviken.

Germania is the name of a part of Djursholm in Danderyd Municipality north of Stockholm. There is a small bay of Stora Värtan called Germaniaviken, a street called Germaniavägen and the park Germaniaparken.

Until 1976 there was a railway stop called Germania at a part of Roslagsbanan (Djursholmsbanan) which was closed that year. This railway stop was originally called Germaniavägen. Station code: Gem.

Djursholm was created as a garden town in the late 19th century, and streets and blocks were given names from ancient Norse mythology. The name Germania, referring to a people in northern Europe, was established in 1889 in the first zoning plan for the new garden town. Many buildings in the oldest parts of Djursholm also refers to a Norse-inspired romantic nationalism. One house in this particular area was also called Germania, situated at Germaniavägen 7. The poet Alice Tegnér lived in Villa Tegnabo between 1890 and 1912, a building which used to be at Germaniavägen 5 but now is replaced.

Older names for Germaniaviken were Österviken and before that Sielviken.
