= Täby kyrkby =

Urban district in Täby municipality, Sweden

Coordinates: 59°29.5′N 18°04′E

Täby kyrkby ("Village of Täby church"), is the northernmost part of Täby Municipality in Sweden. It also forms part of Vallentuna urban area, which is a statistical, non-administrative, unit.

The village was originally named Täby, and has given Täby Municipality its name. Täby kyrkby is situated in the northern part of the municipality, close to Vallentuna Municipality and Lake Vallentuna. Täby kyrkby forms part of the Vallentuna urban area (tätorten Vallentuna). In June 2020, there were 8334 inhabitants in Täby kyrkby.

== History ==
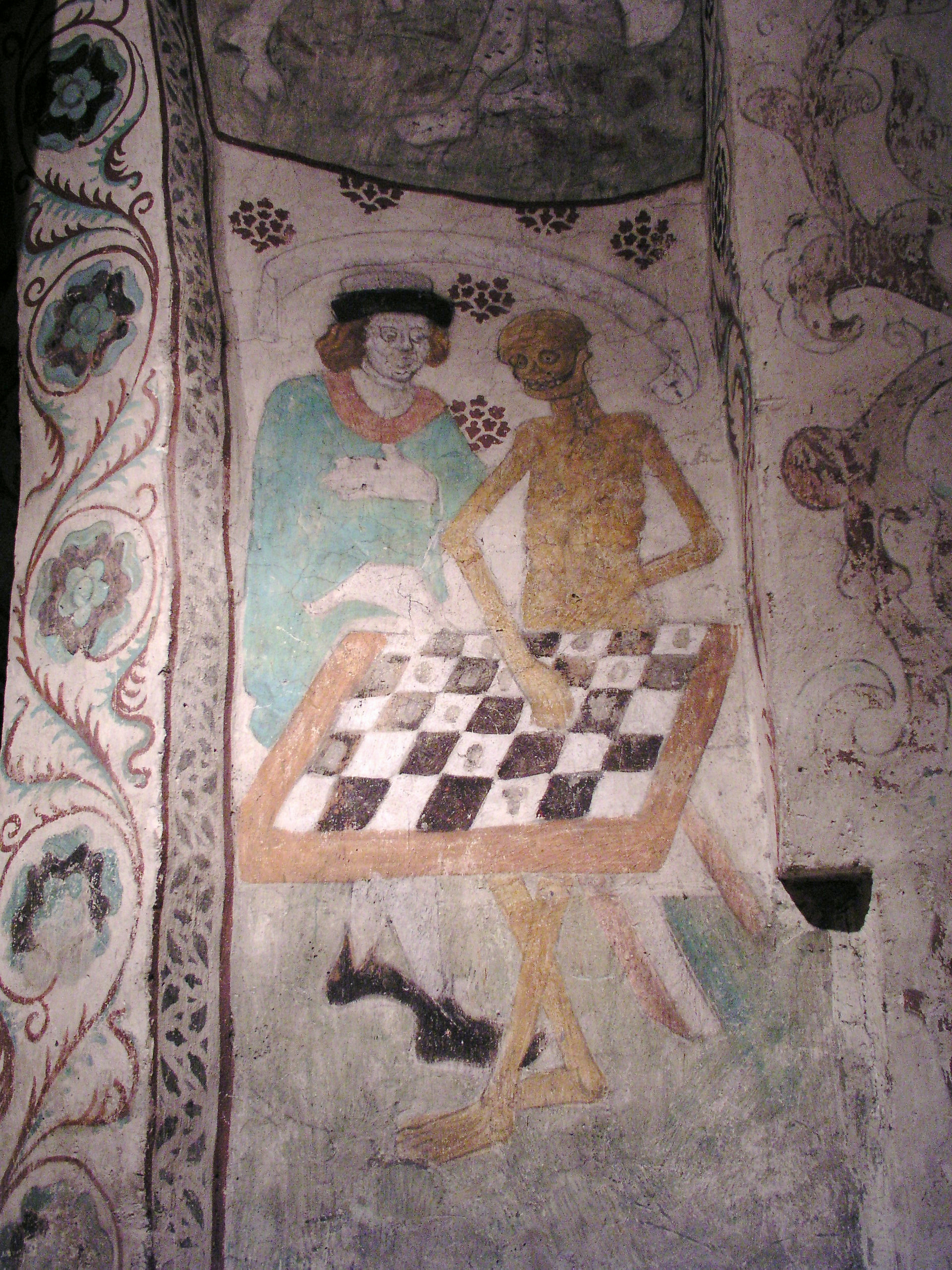
Medieval painting of Death playing chess from Täby Church

The name Täby stems from Tä, which means bridge or paved road. The Tä from which Täby derives its name might have been a bridge that was built in the 11th century and financed by a wealthy Viking named Jarlabanke . "Kyrkby" derives from Täby kyrka (Täby church) which was built in the mid-13th century. The church is well known for its beautiful and colorful paintings by Albertus Pictor, including a motif of Death playing chess. This image provided inspiration for Ingmar Bergman’s movie The Seventh Seal.

Visitors may walk along an ancient path which winds its way through the land south of the priest's house. Along this path, one can see the remains of house terraces, graves, walls and paved roads. These structures were built by farmers who cultivated the land in the Iron Age, almost 2000 years ago.

In the beginning of the 20th century, the construction of the Roslagsbanan (the train line of Roslagen) made it popular to build summer houses by the train line. A well-known Swedish opera singer, Adolf Lemon, bought land that he sectioned and sold.

In 1950, a new city hall was built in Roslags Näsby, which, has become a more central part of Täby in the twentieth century. The administration of the town was moved to the new city hall at this time. In 1968, when the new Täby center was built, Täby was renamed Täby kyrkby, and the town was named Täby.

During the 1960s, as part of the Million Programme (the building of a million new and modern apartments), a series of high-rise apartments was planned for Täby kyrkby. The plans had to be abandoned after only one eight-story apartment was built, because it was discovered that the ground, which used to be the bottom of a lake, was not suitable for large structures. The one building was sinking as a result of the unstable ground.

During the 1960s, several Åsa-Nisse movies, set in the county of Småland in the southern part of Sweden, were filmed in Täby kyrkby.

Täby Kyrkby has four schools: Byleskolan, Midgårdsskolan, Kyrkskolan and Skolhagenskolan. There is a shopping center with grocery stores, a convenience store, a bank, a few restaurants, and a bakery. There are two golf courses. The southern part of Täby kyrkby is home to an area of light industries.

The train Roslagsbanan is the quickest way to get to Stockholm from Täby kyrkby. Täby kyrkby has its own Scouts and a football (soccer) team, IK Frej.

Official site of Täby Municipality
