= Värtan =

Värtan may refer to:

- Lilla Värtan ("Little Värtan") a strait in Stockholm, Sweden
- Stora Värtan ("Big Värtan"), a bay of the Baltic Sea located in the Stockholm archipelago north of the city of Stockholm, Sweden
- Värtans IK, Swedish football club in Stockholm
