= BVG =

BVG may refer to:

== Acronyms and initialisms ==
- Berliner Verkehrsbetriebe (BVG), the main public transport company of Berlin
- Bundesverfassungsgericht (BVG or BVerfG), Federal Court of Justice of Germany
- Bayview Glen School (BVG), a private school in Toronto
- Bremer Vorortbahnen (BVG), a public transport company of Bremen, Germany
- Buena Vista Games, former name of a video game publisher named after Disney Interactive Studios
- Bundes-Verfassungsgesetz (B-VG), the centerpiece of the Constitution of Austria
- BVG, a group to which English singer Sian Charlesworth briefly belonged

== Codes ==
- Berlevåg Airport, Norway (IATA code: BVG)
- Bonkeng language of Cameroon (ISO code: bvg)
- Bragevägen railway station, a former railway station in Stockholm (station code: Bvg)
