= Djursholms Ekeby railway station =

Railway station in Danderyd, Sweden

Djursholms Ekeby
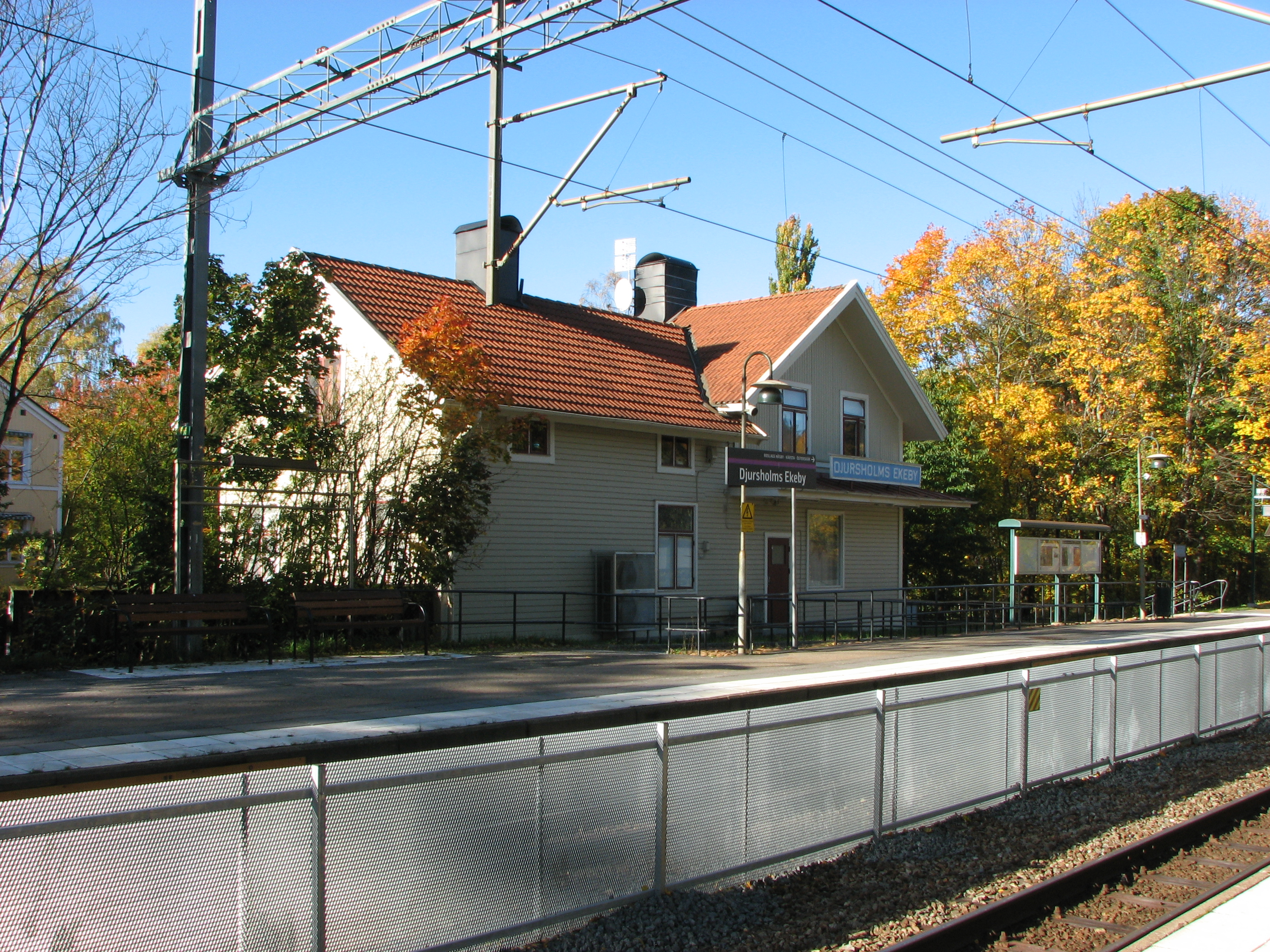

General information
- Location: Danderyd Municipality; Sweden
- Coordinates: 59°24′46″N 18°3′27″E
- System: Roslagsbanan railway station
- Line: Roslagsbanan
- Distance: 8.3 km (5.2 mi) from Stockholms östra
- Platforms: 2 side platforms
- Tracks: 2

Construction
- Structure type: At grade
- Accessible: Yes

History
- Opened: 1885

Passengers
- 2019: 400 boarding per weekday

Services
Preceding station	SL Local & Light Rail	Following station
Bråvallavägen towards Stockholms östra	Roslagsbanan Line 28	Enebyberg towards Österskär
Location

Djursholms Ekeby is a railway station at Roslagsbanan in Sweden. It serves Ekeby in Djursholm in Danderyd Municipality and is 8.3 km from Stockholms östra railway station.

The station was built at the same time as the railway, in 1885. Its original name was Djursholm, since it was situated close to Djursholm, but the name was changed to Danderyd in 1890, when the name Djursholm was transferred to the station which nowadays is called Djursholms Ösby. In 1915 the name was changed again, this time to Djursholms Danderyd, because Djursholm had become a town. The station was then renamed Djursholms Ekeby in 1935.
