= Engelbrektsplan =

Square in Stockholm, Sweden

Coordinates: 59°20′15″N 18°04′14″E

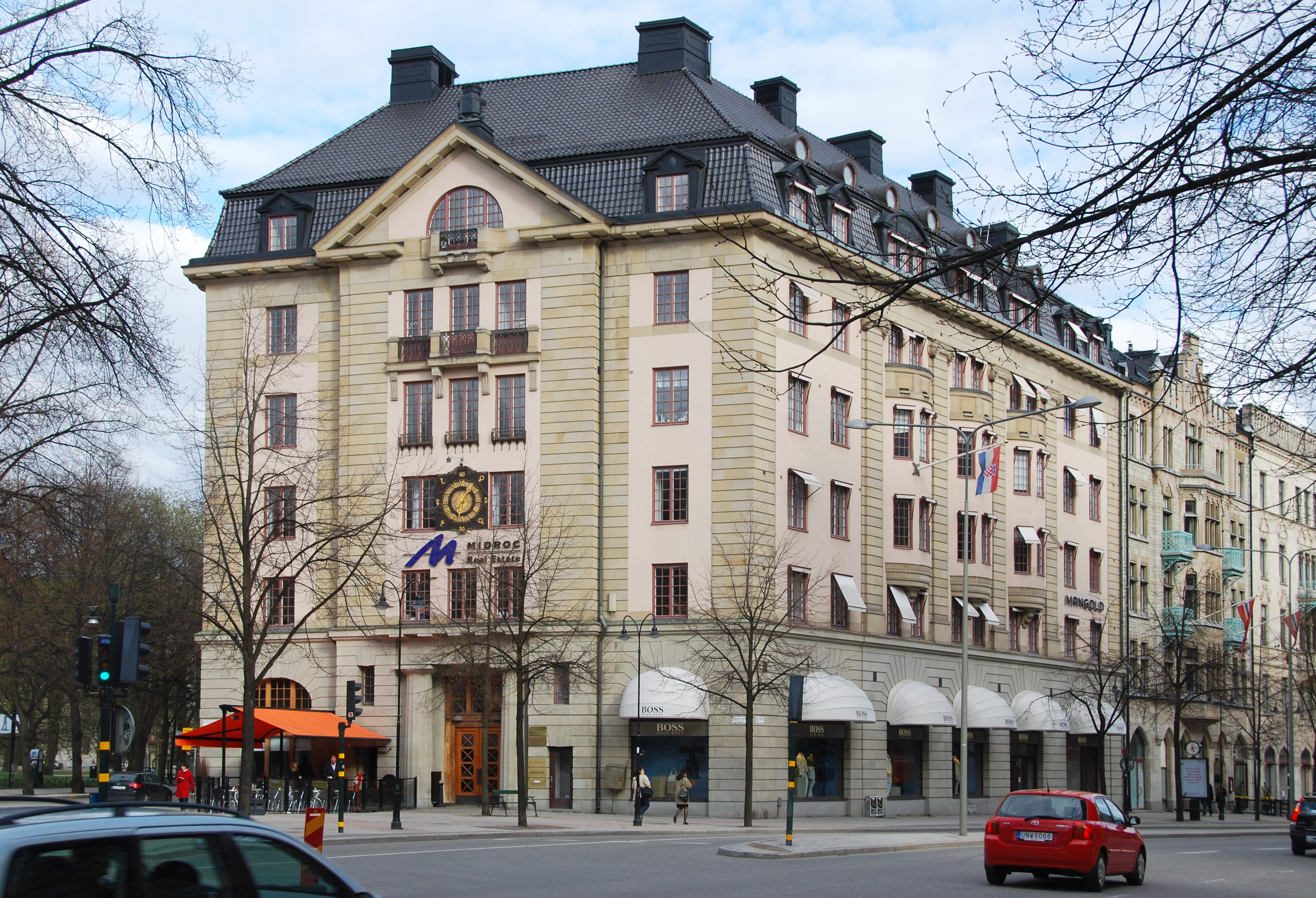
The Stockholm-Roslagen Railways building at Engelbrektsplan

Engelbrektsplan is a town square in Stockholm, Sweden. It is located at the southern end of Engelbrektsgatan in Östermalm and is situated next to Humlegården.

== History ==
Engelbrektsplan was first planned in 1884 when Landbyska, a former brewery, was demolished. The southern part of the site is dominated by the large corner house. It was built in 1914 for the private railway company Stockholm–Roslagens Järnvägar after drawings by architect firm Hagström & Ekman. For most of the 20th Century, this was the terminal station for trains at the tramway Djursholmsbanan, a part of the Roslagsbanan rail system. Between 1885 and 1960, Djursholmsbanan and Roslagsbanan had their terminus here.
