= Viggbyholm =

Neighborhood in Täby Municipality, Greater Stockholm, Sweden

Coordinates: 59°26′57″N 18°06′15″E

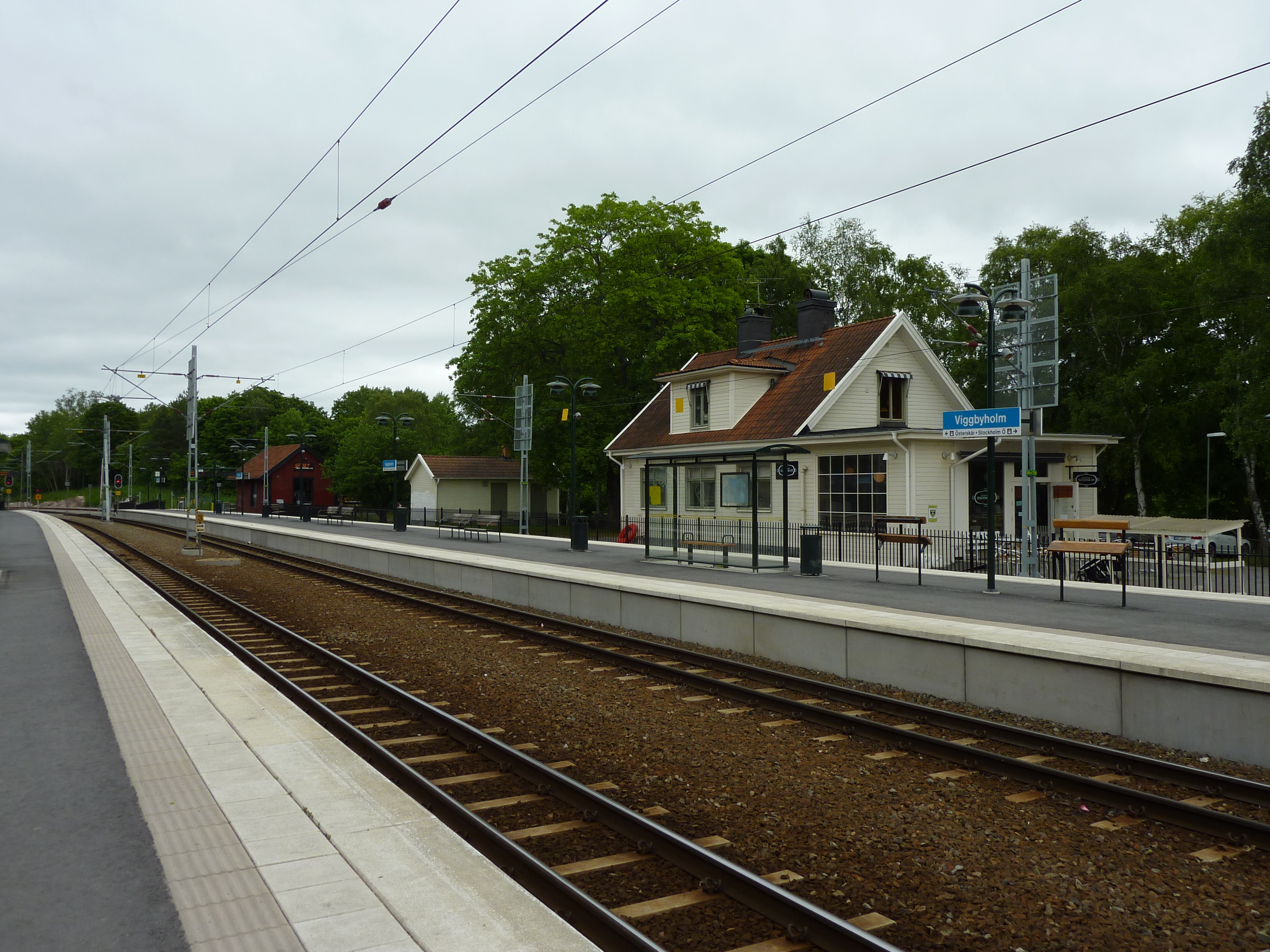
Viggbyholm train station in 2010

Viggbyholm is a neighborhood in Täby Municipality, in Greater Stockholm, Sweden. It is located in the northeast of the municipality, bordering Stora Värtan, an inlet of the Baltic Sea. To the north it borders on Hägernäs, to the west Gribbylund and to the south Näsby Park. Viggbyholm is divided into a northern and a southern district by the E18 motorway and is next to the lake Rönningesjön.

The heart of Viggbyholm consists of the Viggbyholm train station which is trafficked by route 28 of the Roslagsbanan and the charter school Futuraskolan International Bergtorp next to it.
