= Rydbo =

- Location within Stockholm Location within Sweden Location within European Union
- Coordinates: 59°28′N 18°11′E
- Country: Sweden
- Province: Uppland
- County: Stockholm County
- Municipality: Österåker Municipality

Area
  - Total: 0.35 km^{2} (0.14 sq mi)

Population (31 December 2020)
  - Total: 580
  - Density: 1,700/km^{2} (4,300/sq mi)
- Time zone: UTC+1 (CET)
  - Summer (DST): UTC+2 (CEST)

Rydbo is a locality situated in Österåker Municipality, Stockholm County, Sweden with 582 inhabitants in 2010. It is situated about 20 km north-east of Stockholm and is served by Roslagsbanan narrow gauge suburban railway. Near Rydbo is Rydboholm Castle.
