= Djursholms Sveavägen railway station =

Railway station in Danderyd, Sweden

Coordinates: 59°23′37″N 18°04′57″E

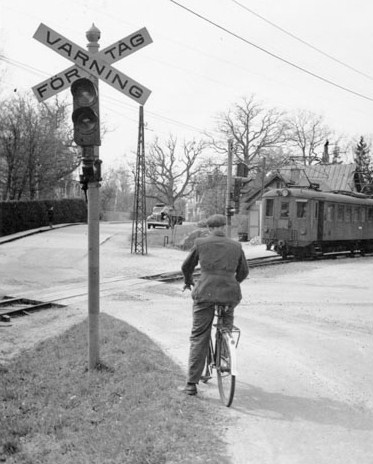
Djursholms Sveavägen seen from across Sveavägen, with the roof of the station building seen behind the train. The biker stands waiting at Henrik Palmes allé, the car is parked on Stockholmsvägen.

Djursholms Sveavägen used to be a railway stop at Djursholmsbanan, a part of Roslagsbanan which was discontinued in 1976. The station was situated at Sveavägen in Djursholm. The place name was added to the street name (with a genitive s) to avoid confusion with Sveavägen in Stockholm.

Station code: Djs
