= Ekskogen =

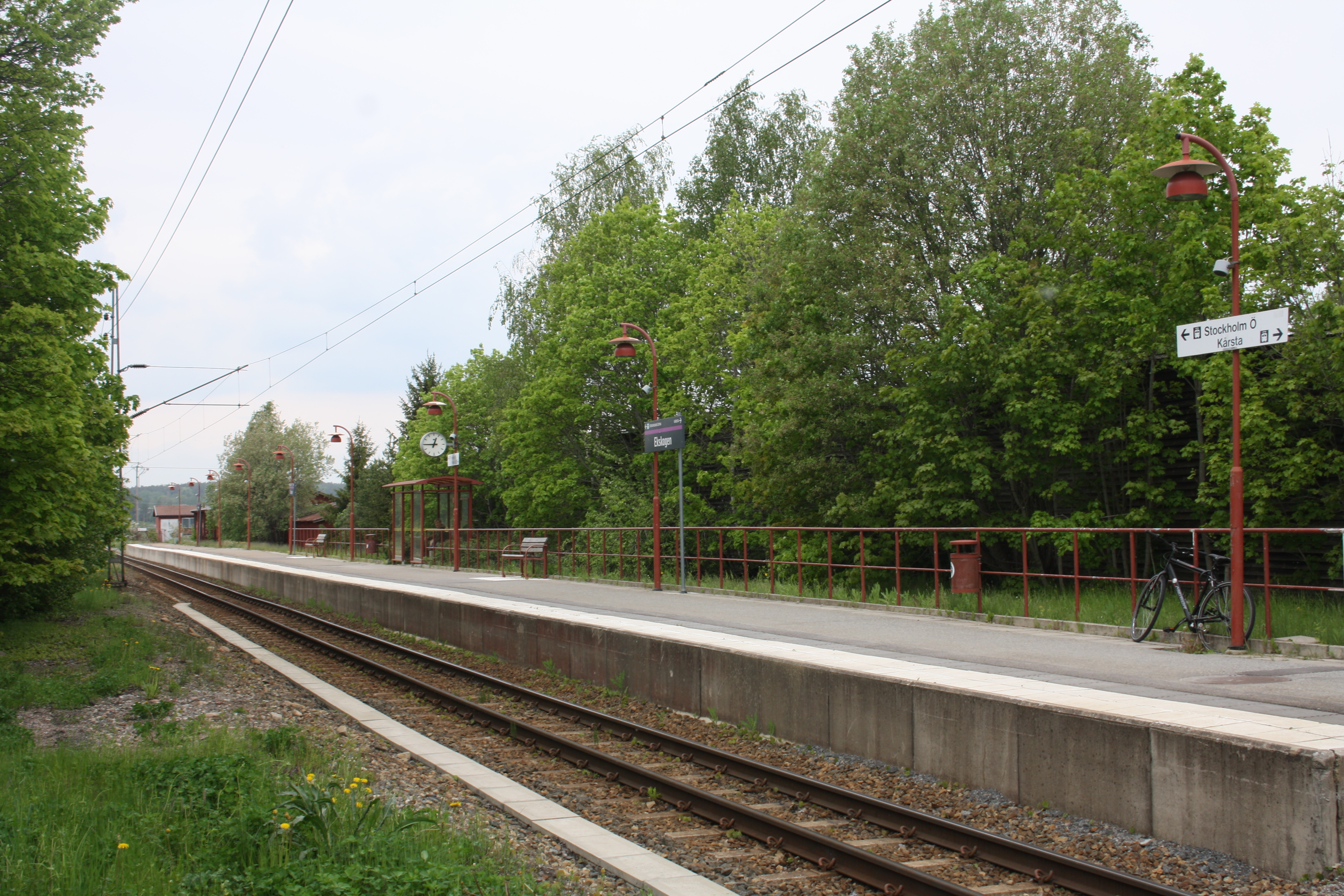
- Roslagsbanan's station in Ekskogen

- Location within Stockholm Location within Sweden Location within European Union
- Coordinates: 59°38′22″N 18°13′31″E
- Country: Sweden
- Province: Uppland
- County: Stockholm County
- Municipality: Vallentuna Municipality

Area
  - Total: 0.61 km^{2} (0.24 sq mi)

Population (2020)
  - Total: 263
  - Density: 430/km^{2} (1,100/sq mi)
- Time zone: UTC+1 (CET)
  - Summer (DST): UTC+2 (CEST)

Ekskogen is a locality situated in Vallentuna Municipality, Stockholm County, Sweden with 263 inhabitants in 2020. The narrow gauge railway line Roslagsbanan has a stop in Ekskogen, with roughly one train per hour per direction. Ekskogen is also served by two bus lines, 661 and 666.
