= Kårsta =

- Location within Stockholm Location within Sweden Location within European Union
- Coordinates: 59°39′N 18°15′E
- Country: Sweden
- Province: Uppland
- County: Stockholm County
- Municipality: Vallentuna Municipality

Area
  - Total: 0.44 km^{2} (0.17 sq mi)

Population (31 December 2020)
  - Total: 513
  - Density: 1,200/km^{2} (3,000/sq mi)
- Time zone: UTC+1 (CET)
  - Summer (DST): UTC+2 (CEST)

Kårsta is a locality situated in Vallentuna Municipality, Stockholm County, Sweden with 457 inhabitants in 2010. Kårsta is since 1980, when the line to Rimbo was cut, the northern terminus of Roslagsbanan narrow gauge suburban railway.

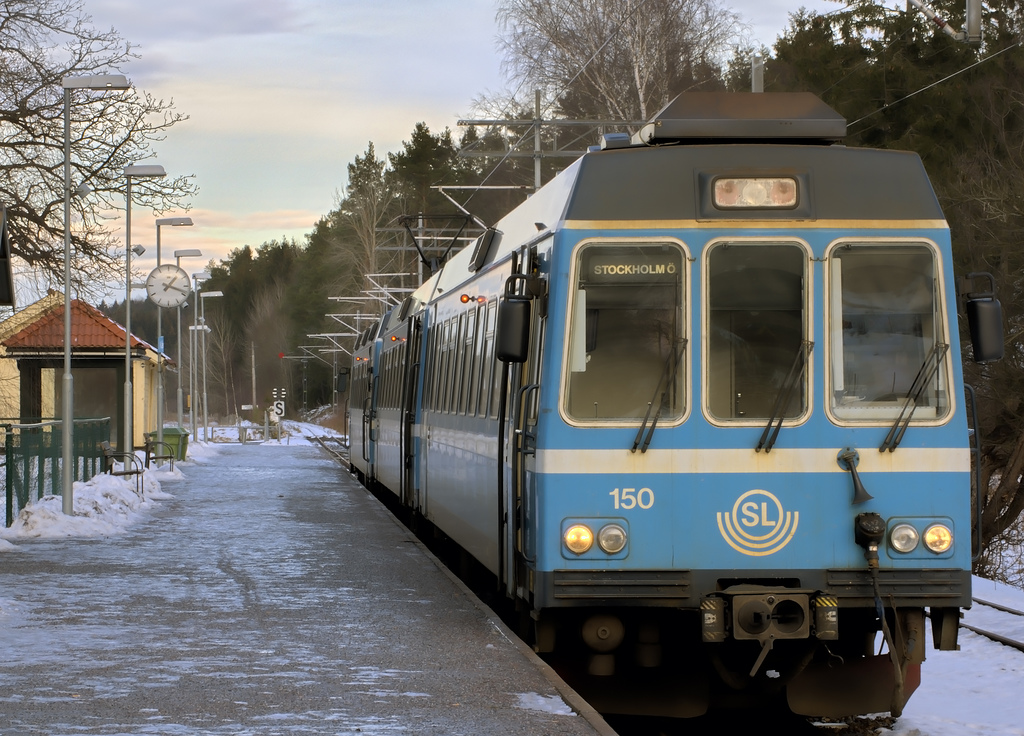
Kårsta Roslagsbanan station
