= Österskär =

Residential area in Sweden

Coordinates: 59.46156°N 18.31100°E

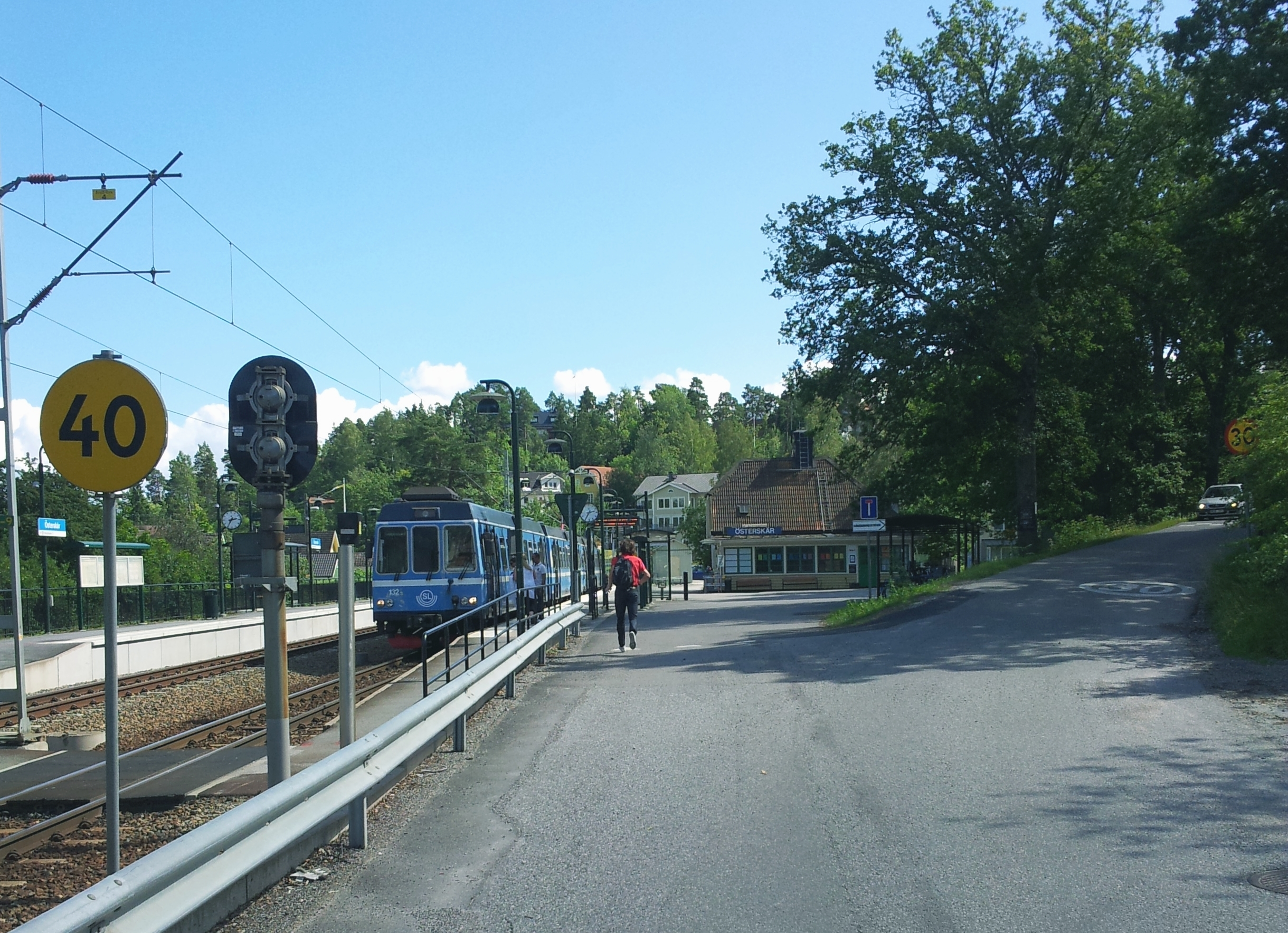
Österskär railway station

Österskär is the eastern part of Åkersberga, Österåker Municipality, in Sweden. It hosts the terminal station of the Stockholm suburban railway Roslagsbanan. The area is located in a hilly peninsula between Tunaviken and Sätterfjärden, northwest of Trälhavet. Many Stockholmers have their boats in one of Österskär's many marinas. There is a residents association.

== History ==
In 1906, Roslagsbanan opened to Österskär for freight traffic. Among other things in Österskär, there was a smaller feldspar and quartz mine as well as a mansion ("Tuna Gård"). During the 1900s, plans to make Österskär an exclusive suburb was settled, and several large villas were built along the coastline. Influences came from Djursholm and Saltsjöbaden. At the time a beach, Österskärs Havsbad (more popularly known as Solbrännan) was built and Österskärs steam boat jetty was completed in 1912. During the 1920s and 30s, more and more holiday homes were built and became a summer residence for many Stockholmers.

== Today ==
The big expansion of full-time residents took off in the 1970s and now more or less the entire peninsula is built on. Österskär is one of northern Stockholm's most exclusive suburbs, and has relatively high real estate prices compared to rest of Sweden.

== People ==
- Jesper Parnevik
- Bosse Parnevik
- Peg Parnevik
- Olle Helander
- Pär Nuder
- Stig Järrel
- Marianne Fredriksson
- Carina Berg

== See also ==
- Österåker
- Åkersberga
- Trälhavets Båtklubb
