= Djursholms Ösby railway station =

Railway station in Danderyd, Sweden

Djursholms Ösby

General information
- Location: Djursholm, Danderyd; Sweden
- Coordinates: 59°23′53″N 18°03′32″E
- Operator: Storstockholms Lokaltrafik/Arriva
- Line: Roslag Railway
- Connections: Bus: 509

History
- Opened: 1890

Passengers
- 2019: 1,000 boarding per weekday

Services
Preceding station	SL Local & Light Rail	Following station
Mörby towards Stockholms östra	Roslagsbanan Line 27	Roslags Näsby towards Kårsta
Mörby towards Stockholms östra	Roslagsbanan Line 28	Bråvallavägen towards Österskär
Mörby towards Stockholms östra	Roslagsbanan Line 29	Vendevägen towards Näsbypark
Location

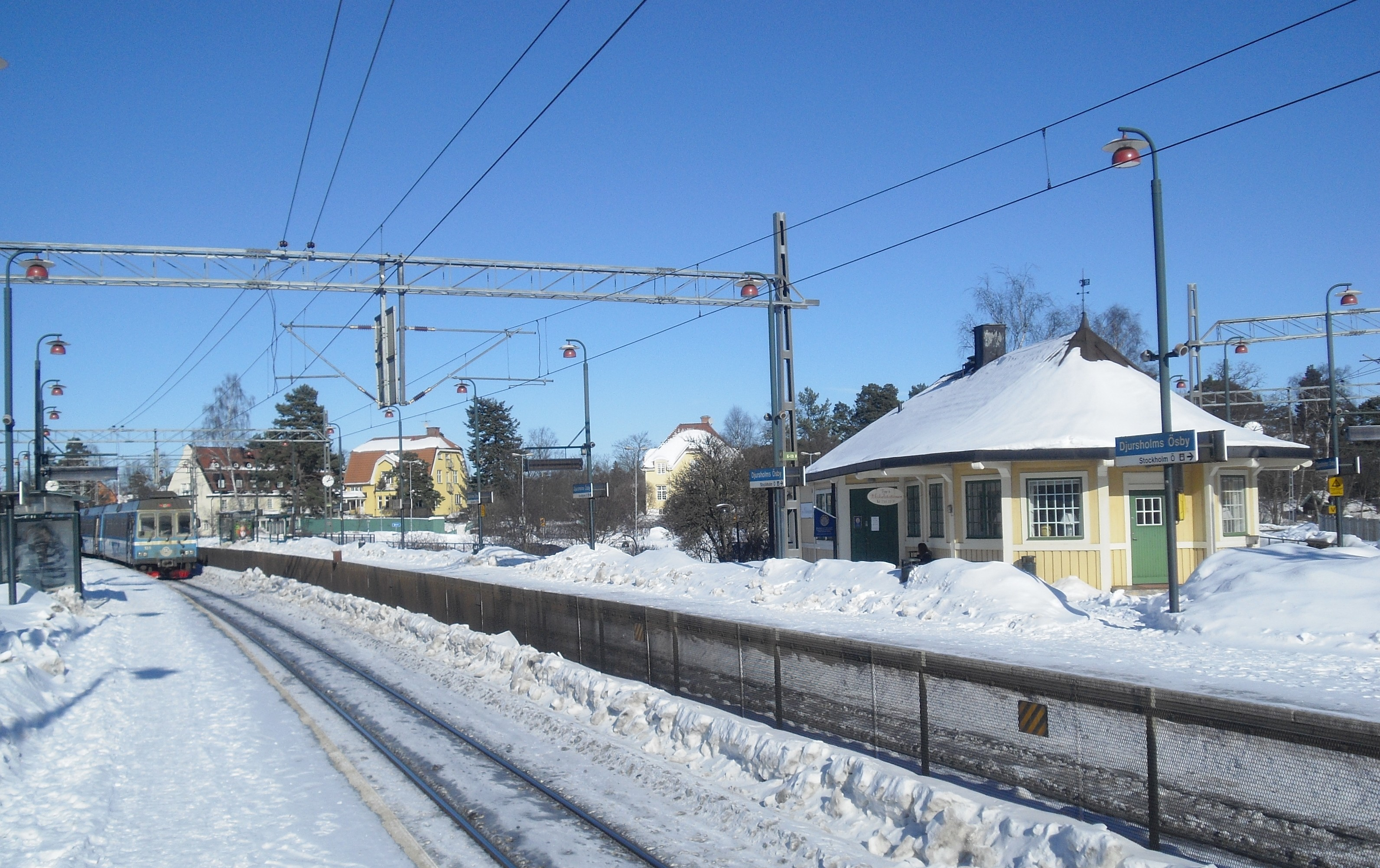
Djursholms Ösby in March 2010, showing the old station building

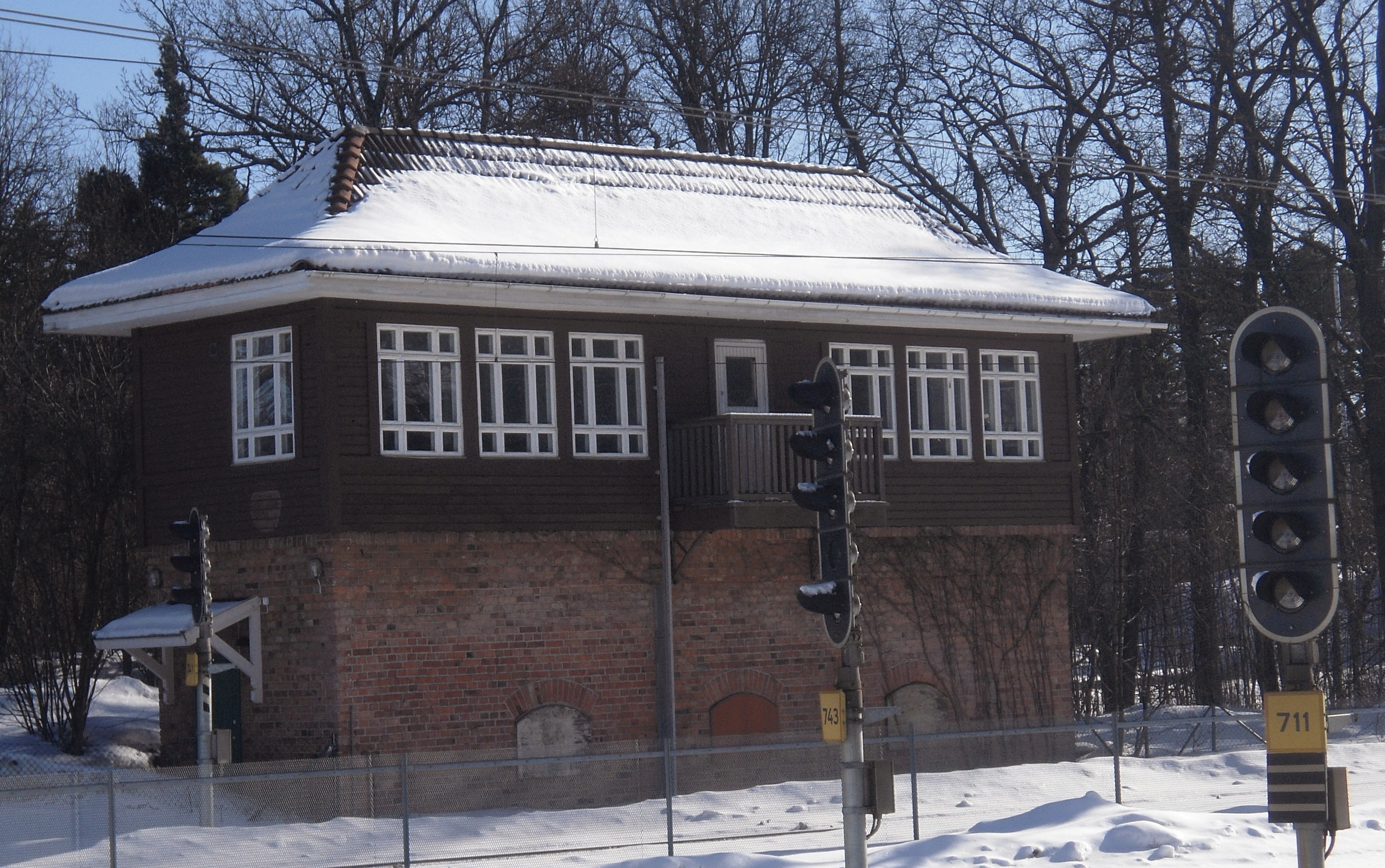
Old signal box at Djursholms Ösby used until 1984

Djursholms Ösby is a branch railway station on Roslagsbanan, a suburban commuter railway north of Stockholm in Sweden. It serves Ösby in Djursholm in Danderyd Municipality and is 6.6 km from Stockholm östra railway station.

The station opened in 1890 when Djursholmsbanan line was inaugurated, at the site where this line branched off from the tracks to Rimbo, and was originally called Djursholm. From 1893 to 1920 the name of the station was Ösby and since then it has been Djursholms Ösby. The line was electrified on 15 May 1895. In 1910 another branch was opened, also from this site, first to Altorp, later extended to Lahäll and Näsbypark. With local traffic in four directions, the station became very busy, with approximately 340 trains per day in the early 1950s, making it one of Sweden's busiest railway stations at the time. It originally had a train shed for Djursholmsbanan.

The original Djursholmsbanan (the Eddavägen branch line) was closed in 1976, and during the 1970s and 1980s the whole Roslagsbanan was threatened with closure, but in the late 1990s Djursholms Ösby station was completely renovated.

There are four platforms: two for the Kårsta and Österskär lines and two for the Näsbypark line. The old station building remains in the middle, and is now rented by a private tenant. A signal box, which was still in use into the 1980s, also remains.
