= Ekeby, Munsö socken =

- Smaller locality
- Interactive map of Ekeby, Munsö socken
- Coordinates: 59°21′46″N 17°35′40″E
- Country: Sweden
- County: Stockholm County
- Municipality: Ekerö Municipality
- Time zone: UTC+1 (CET)
  - Summer (DST): UTC+2 (CEST)

Ekeby, Munsö socken is a village (smaller locality) in Ekerö Municipality, Stockholm County, southeastern Sweden.
