= Ekeby, Upplands Väsby =

Ekeby
- Location in Upplands Väsby Municipality in Stockholm County Ekeby (Stockholm)
- Coordinates: 59°35′N 17°56′E
- Country: Sweden
- Province: Uppland
- County: Stockholm County
- Municipality: Upplands Väsby Municipality

Area
  - Total: 0.29 km^{2} (0.11 sq mi)

Population (31 December 2010)
  - Total: 258
  - Density: 891/km^{2} (2,310/sq mi)
- Time zone: UTC+1 (CET)
  - Summer (DST): UTC+2 (CEST)

Ekeby was a locality situated in Upplands Väsby Municipality, Stockholm County, Sweden with 258 inhabitants in 2010.
