= Roslags Näsby =

Urban district in Täby, Sweden

Coordinates: 59°25′55″N 18°3′41″E

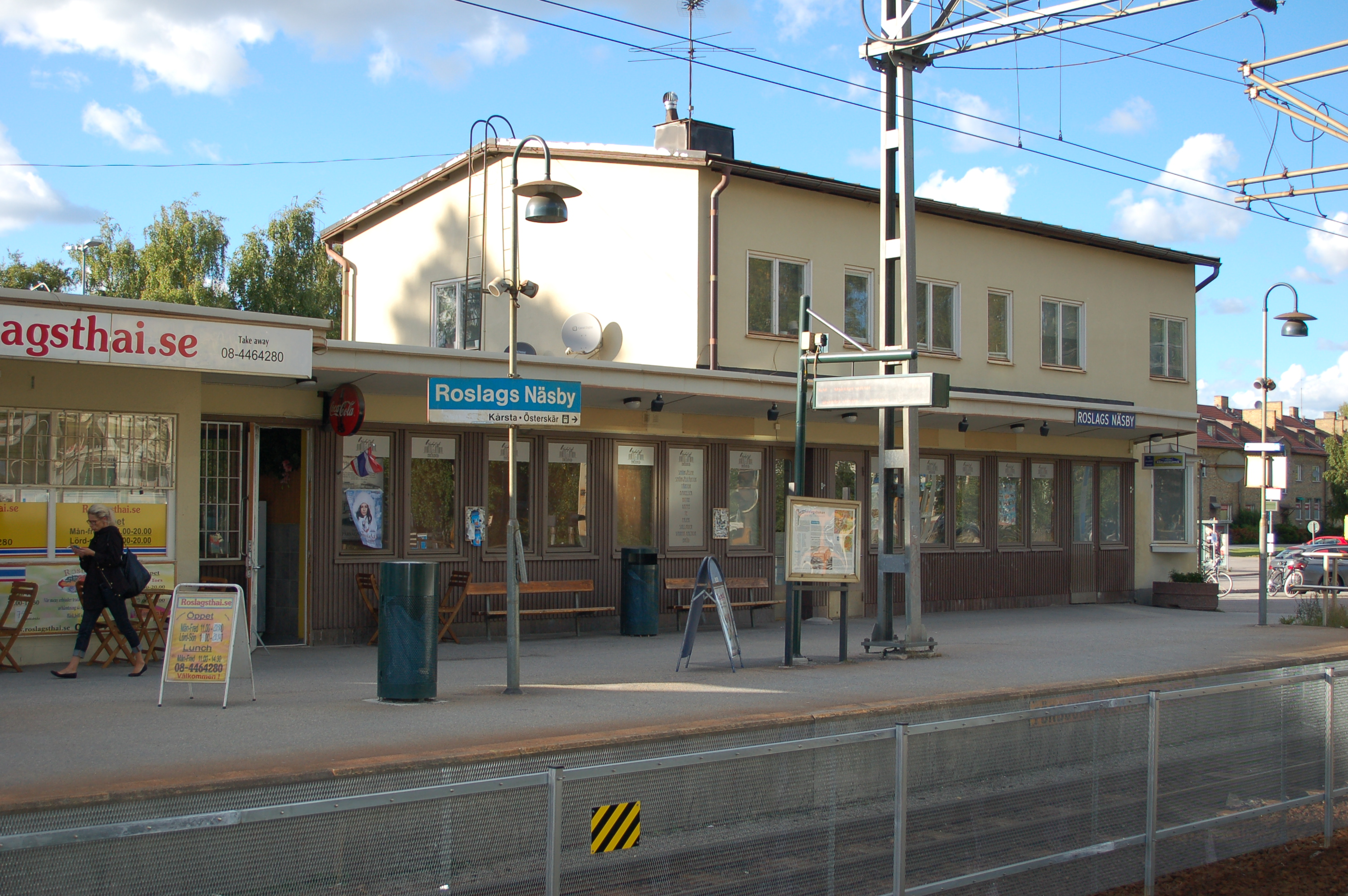
Roslags Näsby railway station

Roslags Näsby is a neighbourhood in the southern part of Täby Municipality, north of Stockholm. It is dominated by detached single-family houses. As of 2018, a plan to redevelop the area has been approved. The present railway station (Roslagsbanan) will be demolished and replaced by a new one a bit further north. Most of the present buildings on the western side of the station will also be replaced by 1,400 new dwellings in multistory apartment buildings.
