= Täby =

- Location within Stockholm Location within Sweden
- Coordinates: 59°26′N 18°05′E
- Country: Sweden
- Province: Uppland
- County: Stockholm County
- Municipality: Täby Municipality, Danderyd Municipality and Sollentuna Municipality

Area
  - Total: 25.81 km^{2} (9.97 sq mi)

Population (31 December 2012)
  - Total: 65,364
  - Density: 2,374/km^{2} (6,150/sq mi)
- Time zone: UTC+1 (CET)
  - Summer (DST): UTC+2 (CEST)

Täby (Swedish pronunciation: [ˈtɛ̌ːbʏ]) was previously a trimunicipal locality, with 76,700 inhabitants in 2024. However, as from 2016, Statistics Sweden has amalgamated this locality with the Stockholm urban area. It is the seat of Täby Municipality in Stockholm County, Sweden. It was also partly located in Danderyd Municipality (the Enebyberg area) and a very small part in Sollentuna Municipality.

Täby kyrkby in the northern part of Täby Municipality forms on the other hand part of the Vallentuna urban area.

The population as of 2000
Municipality	Population in T.	Other urban areas	Other	Total	% of municipality population
Täby	53,122	6,767	308	60,197	88.25
Danderyd	4,701	24,817	52	29,570	15.90
Sollentuna	11	57,934	103	58,048	0.02
Total	57,834	89,518	463	147,815	39.13
