= Stora Värtan =

Inlet of the Baltic Sea in Sweden

Coordinates: 59°24′58″N 18°08′13″E

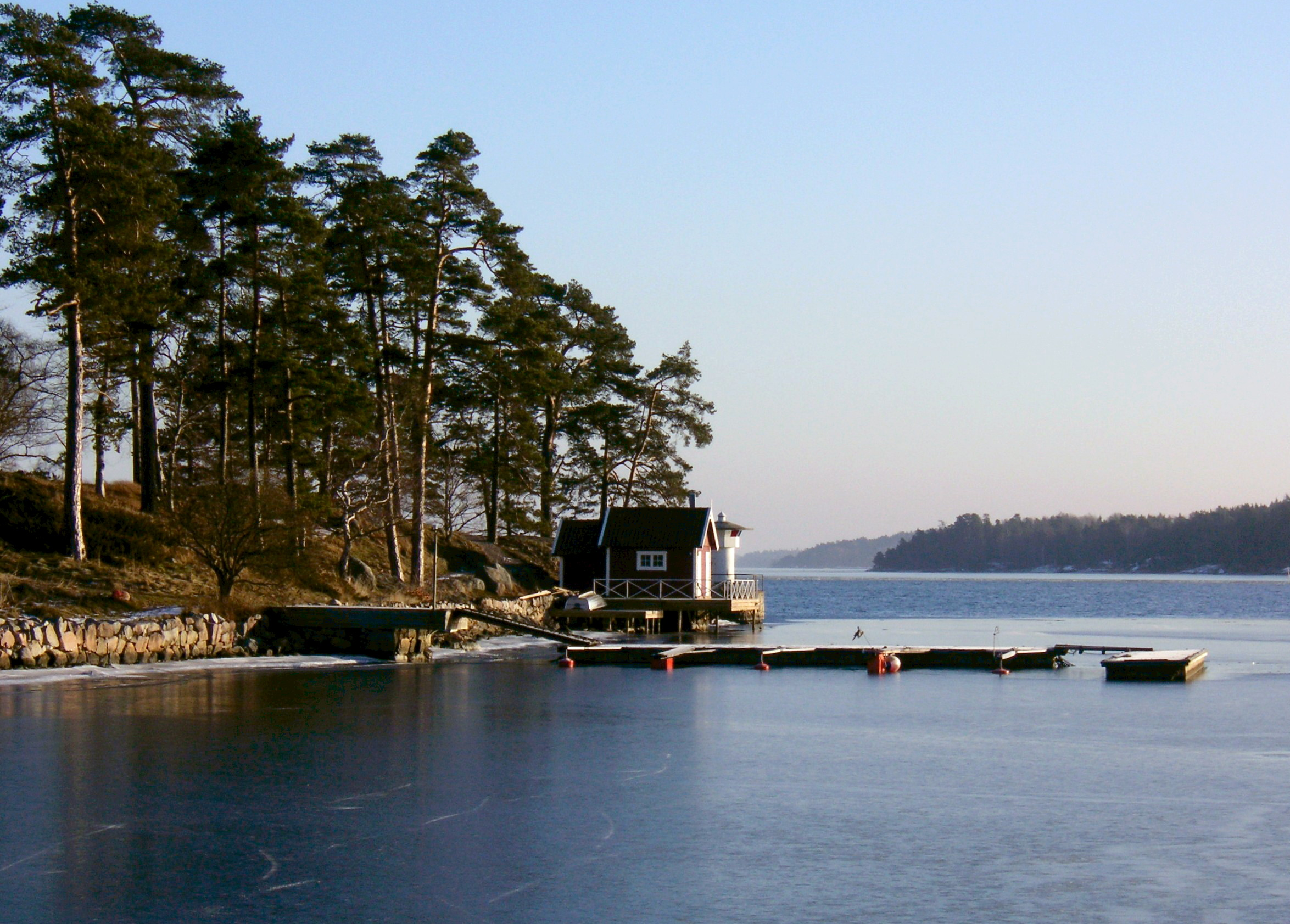
View of Stora Värtan from Djursholm.

Stora Värtan is an inlet of the Baltic Sea located in the Stockholm archipelago north of the city of Stockholm, Sweden. It is bordered to the west by the municipalities of Täby and Danderyd, to the south by the municipality of Lidingö, to the north by the municipality of Österåker and to the northeast by the municipality of Vaxholm.

Stora Värtan is about three kilometers wide from east to west and approximately six kilometers wide north to south. The inlet connects to Lilla Värtan in the southwest, Kyrkfjärden in the northeast and Askrikefjärden in the southeast. The inlet's western beaches, near the towns of Djursholm and Täby, are heavily populated, while the eastern waterfront is relatively undeveloped.

Many bays surround the Stora Värtan and it also contains a number of islands, including Tornön, Bastuholmen, Lilla Skraggen, Stora Skraggen – which houses an active shipyard – and Storholmen, where the inlet flows into Askrikefjärden. Although it lacks road access, Storholmen is inhabited year-round. The islet of Råholmen – where the boundaries of Danderyd, Täby, Vaxholm and Österåker municipalities all meet – is also located in the Stora Värtan.
