= Djursholmsbanan =

Railway line in Sweden

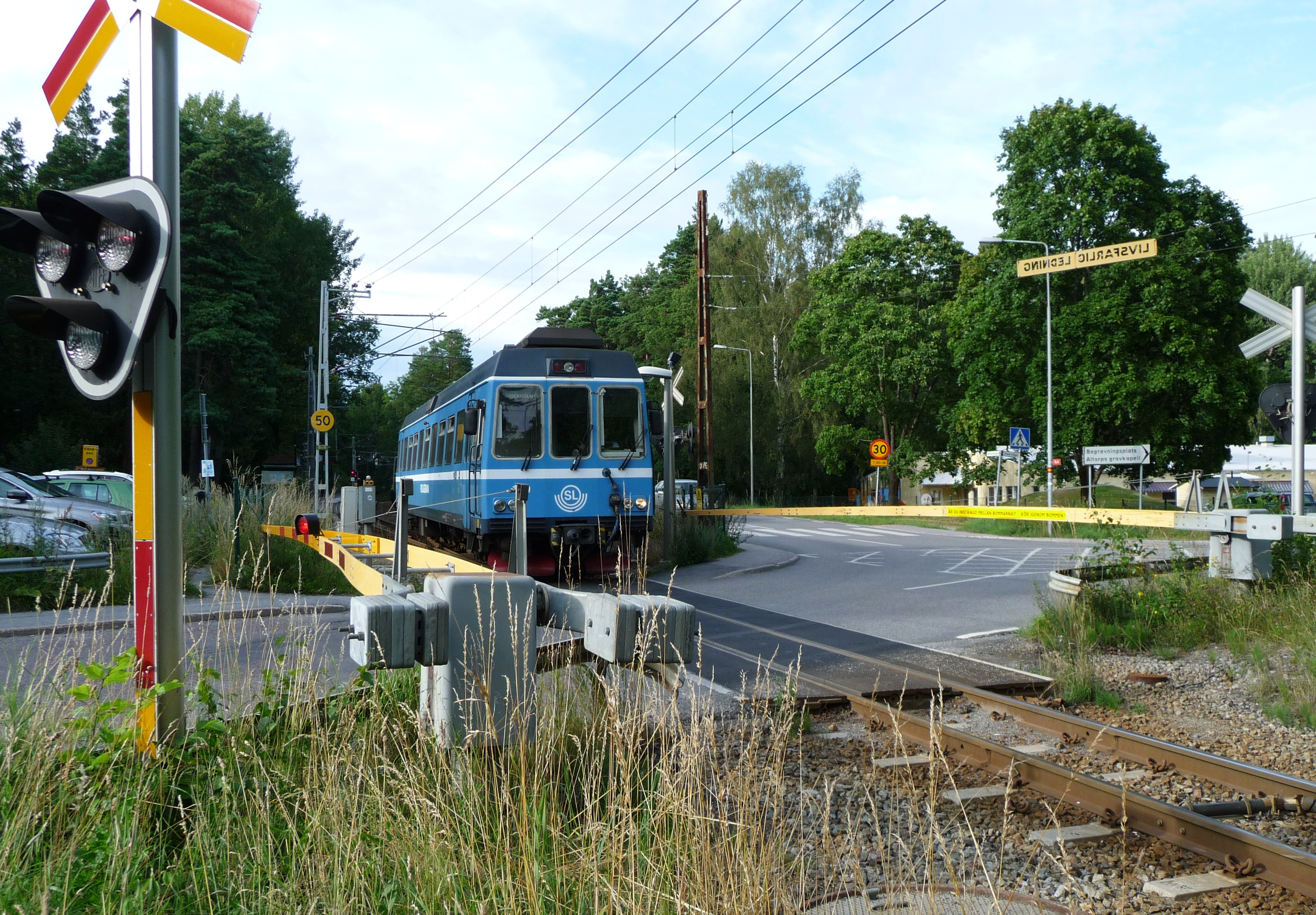
- A modern train at the railway crossing of Bråvallavägen, just south of Altorp station in 2012.

Overview
- Locale: Sweden
- Termini: Djursholms Ösby; Näsbypark

History
- Opened: 20 December 1890

Technical
- Track gauge: Swedish three foot (891 mm or 2 ft 11 3/32 in)

Djursholmsbanan (DjB) was the original name of a network of 891 mm (2 ft 11 3/32 in) Swedish three foot narrow-gauge urban railways between Stockholm and Djursholm in Stockholm County, Sweden. This network is now a part of Roslagsbanan, but the oldest line was closed in 1976.

== History ==
Djursholmsbanan was inaugurated on 20 December 1890, connected to the network of Stockholm–Roslagens Järnvägar at the then Djursholm railway station, later renamed Djursholms Ösby station]]. The lines were originally owned by the real estate company Djursholms AB, which had been founded in 1889 for the development of the garden town Djursholm on the lands around Djursholm Castle. The creation of the railway was a key part in making Djursholm attractive for potential buyers of lots in the new community, giving them a means of good communication to Stockholm.

The trains on Djursholmsbanan were driven on electricity, originally from its own power plant at Stocksund harbour, close to the then Stocksund railway station. The network north and east of Djursholms Ösby was owned by Djursholmsbanan, while the trains shared the tracks with the steam powered Rimbo trains of Stockholm–Roslagens Järnvägar (SRJ) between Djursholms Ösby and Stockholms östra railway station. From Östra station, the Djursholm trains had their own tram track ending closer to the city centre, at Engelbrektsplan.

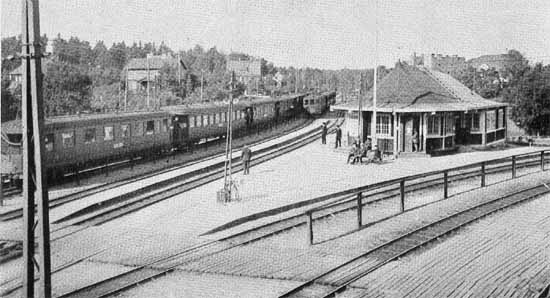
Djursholms Ösby railway station in 1926 with the DjB tracks turning to the right towards central Djursholm.

A second line, in the western parts of Djursholm, was opened in 1910, terminating in Altorp. The original plan was to connect the two lines in the north, allowing for passengers to ride all the way around Djursholm, but the newer line was eventually drawn to the new neighbourhood of Näsbypark in Täby Municipality instead.

DjB was eventually taken over by SRJ, which in turn was nationalised in 1959. The southern parts of the former SRJ network, including Djusholmsbanan, was in turn taken over by Storstockholms lokaltrafik (SL) some years later. SL gave its part of the former SRJ network the new name Roslagsbanan. In the mid-20th Century, all of these lines had been electrified.

The tram tracks to Engelbrektsplan were closed in 1960 but instead, passengers coming to Stockholm Östra station has a connection to the Stockholm Metro through the adjacent Tekniska högskolan metro station since 1973.

The oldest line, between Djursholms Ösby and Eddavägen, was closed in 1976, due to low passenger numbers in the relatively sparsely populated garden town.
