= Universitetet =

Universitetet (Swedish: "the university") is the name of two rail stations, both named for Stockholm University.

- Universitetet railway station
- Universitetet metro station
