= Frescati (Stockholm) =

Park in Stockholm

Coordinates: 59°21′55″N 18°03′05″E

Map of the Frescati area, north-east of central Stockholm. The main road "Roslagsvägen" continues north to join E18. The area used to be served by two railway stations (shown) and one underground railway station (not shown on this map); the two railway stations are now replaced by one

Frescati is a park-like area on the northern outskirts of Stockholm, Sweden. It is situated in an area on Norra Djurgårdsstaden. Frescati is part of the Royal National City Park (Kungliga nationalstadsparken).

== History ==
The name originated with Villa Frescati which was designed in 1791–1792 by the architect Louis Jean Desprez (ca 1743–1804) for courtier and diplomat Gustaf Mauritz Armfelt (1757–1814). The villa is named after the Italian city of Frascati, visited by King Gustavus III during his Italian journey. During the 19th century the name began to be used for a larger area in the vicinity of the house, and the Royal Swedish Academy for Agriculture established its Experimental Field there. It was followed by a number of other scientific and academic institutions, including the Royal Swedish Academy of Sciences, the Swedish Museum of Natural History, the Bergian Garden, a botanical garden, and eventually Stockholm University. Frescati (including the campus area) is today a part of the Royal National City Park.

== Public transport ==
In the middle of the area the Metro station Universitetet (The University) and the equally named railway station are located. The railway station is situated at the narrow gauge railway Roslagsbanan. In 2010, the present railway station replaced two earlier stations, Universitetet (situated somewhat further south) and Frescati (usually spelled Freskati; situated somewhat further north).

== Gallery ==
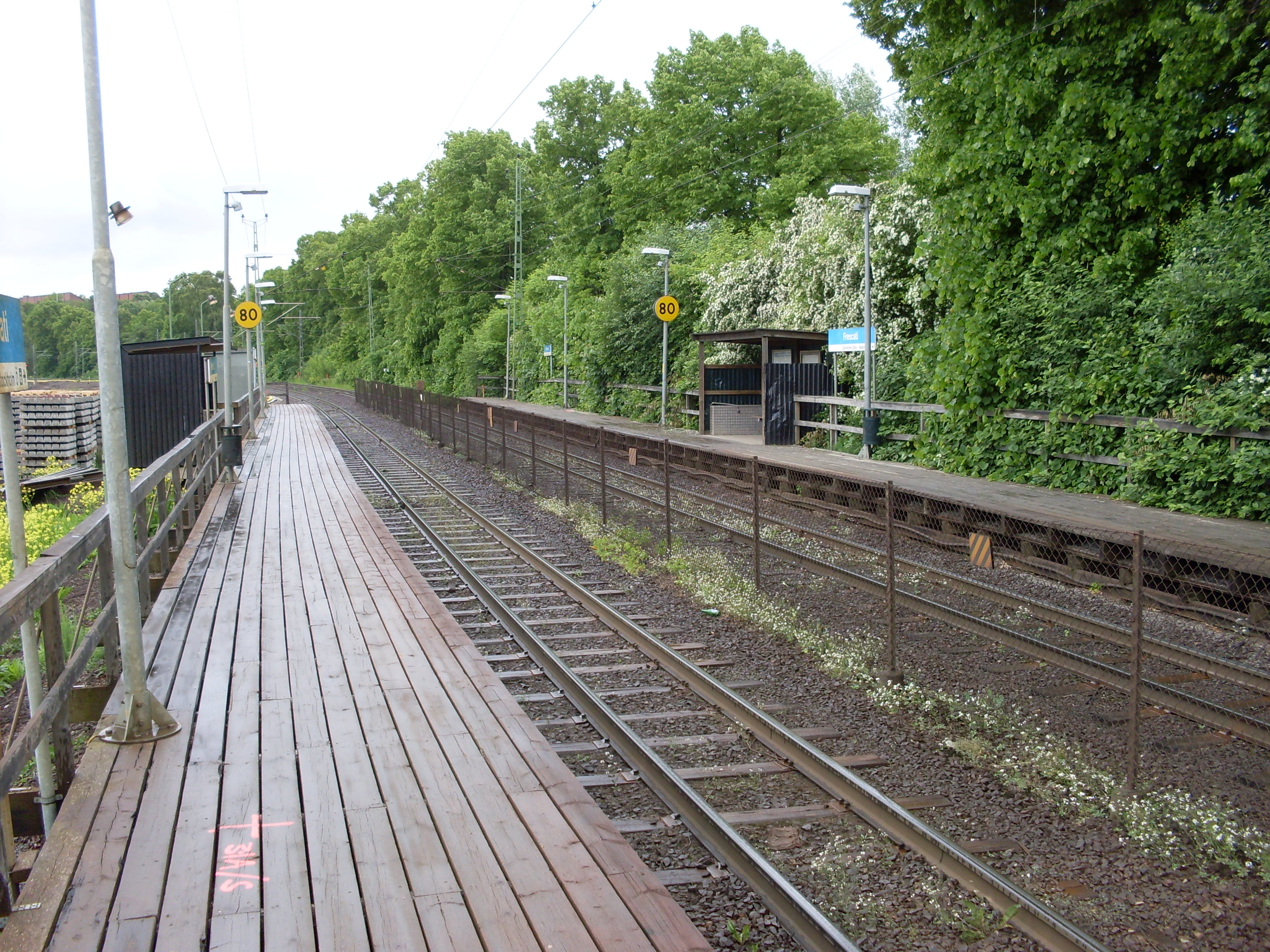
Frescati railway stop, while it was still in service

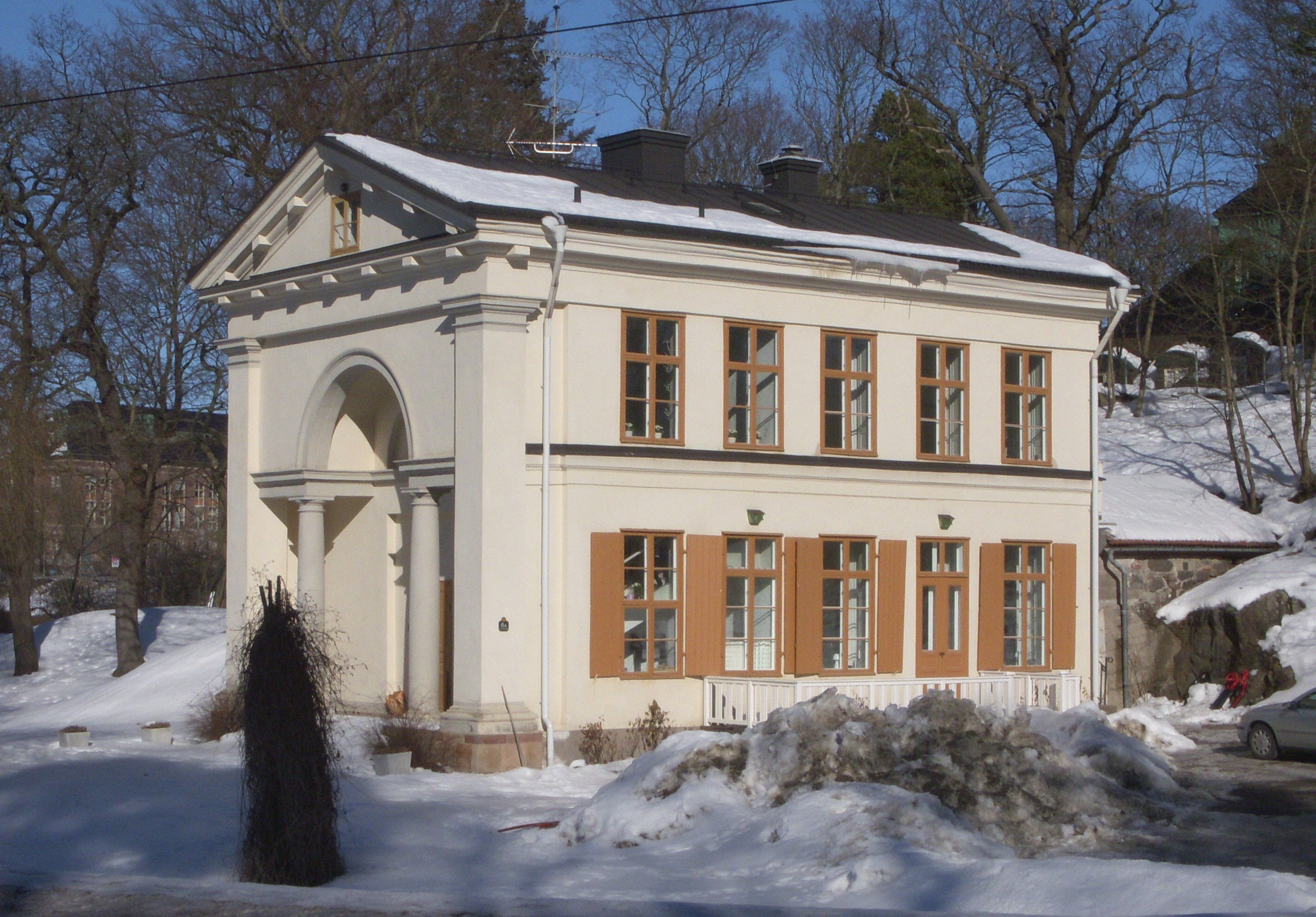
Villa Frescati. 2010
