= Danderyds sjukhus metro station =

Stockholm Metro station

Danderyds sjukhus
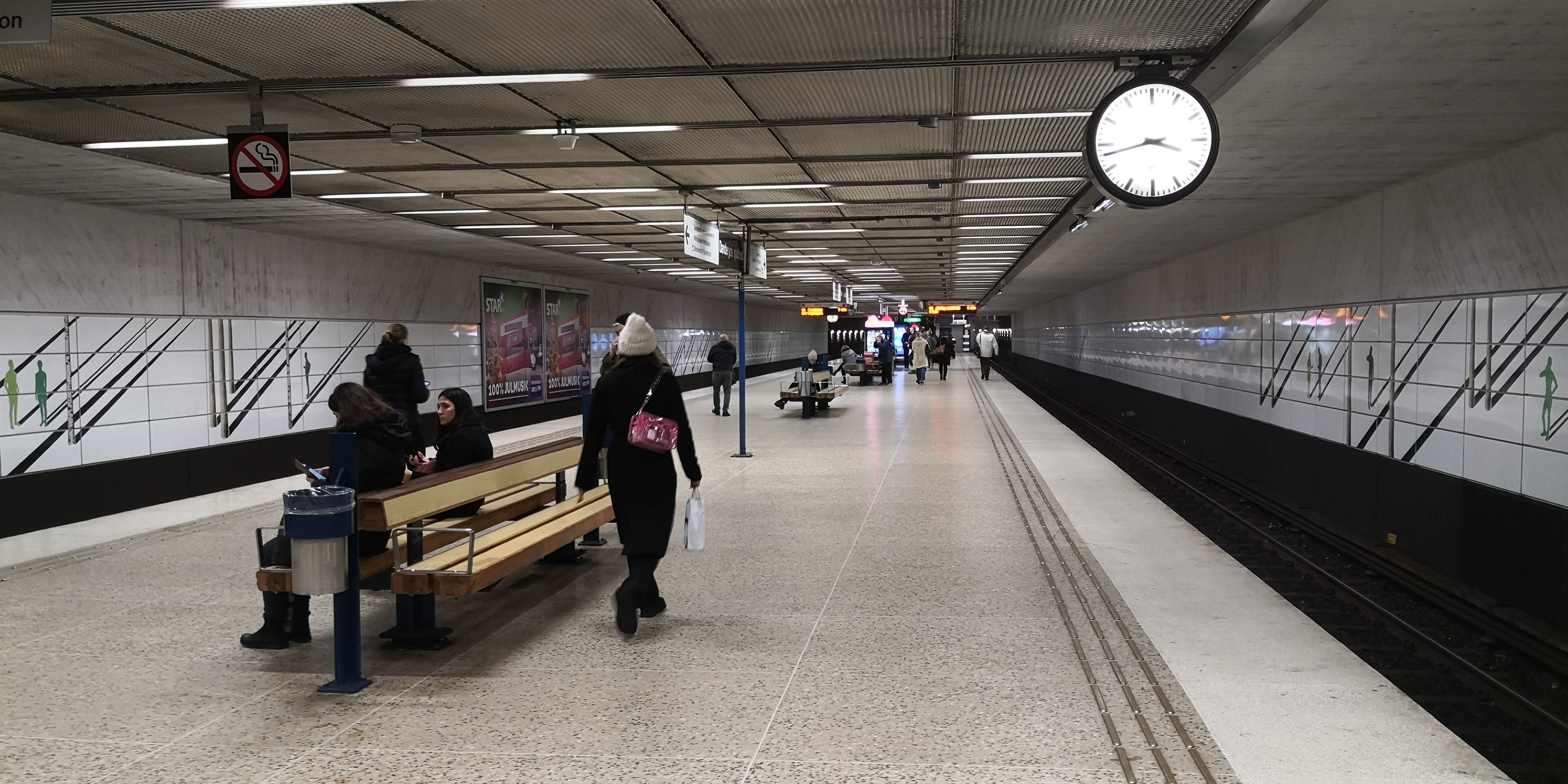

General information
- Coordinates: 59°23′30″N 18°02′29″E
- Elevation: 6.4 m (21 ft) above sea level
- System: Stockholm Metro station
- Owner: Storstockholms Lokaltrafik
- Platforms: 1 island platform
- Tracks: 2

Construction
- Structure type: Underground
- Depth: 7 m (23 ft)
- Accessible: Yes

Other information
- Station code: DAS

History
- Opened: 29 January 1978; 48 years ago

Passengers
- 2019: 14,850 boarding per weekday

Services
Preceding station	Stockholm Metro	Following station
Bergshamra towards Fruängen	Line 14	Mörby centrum Terminus
Location
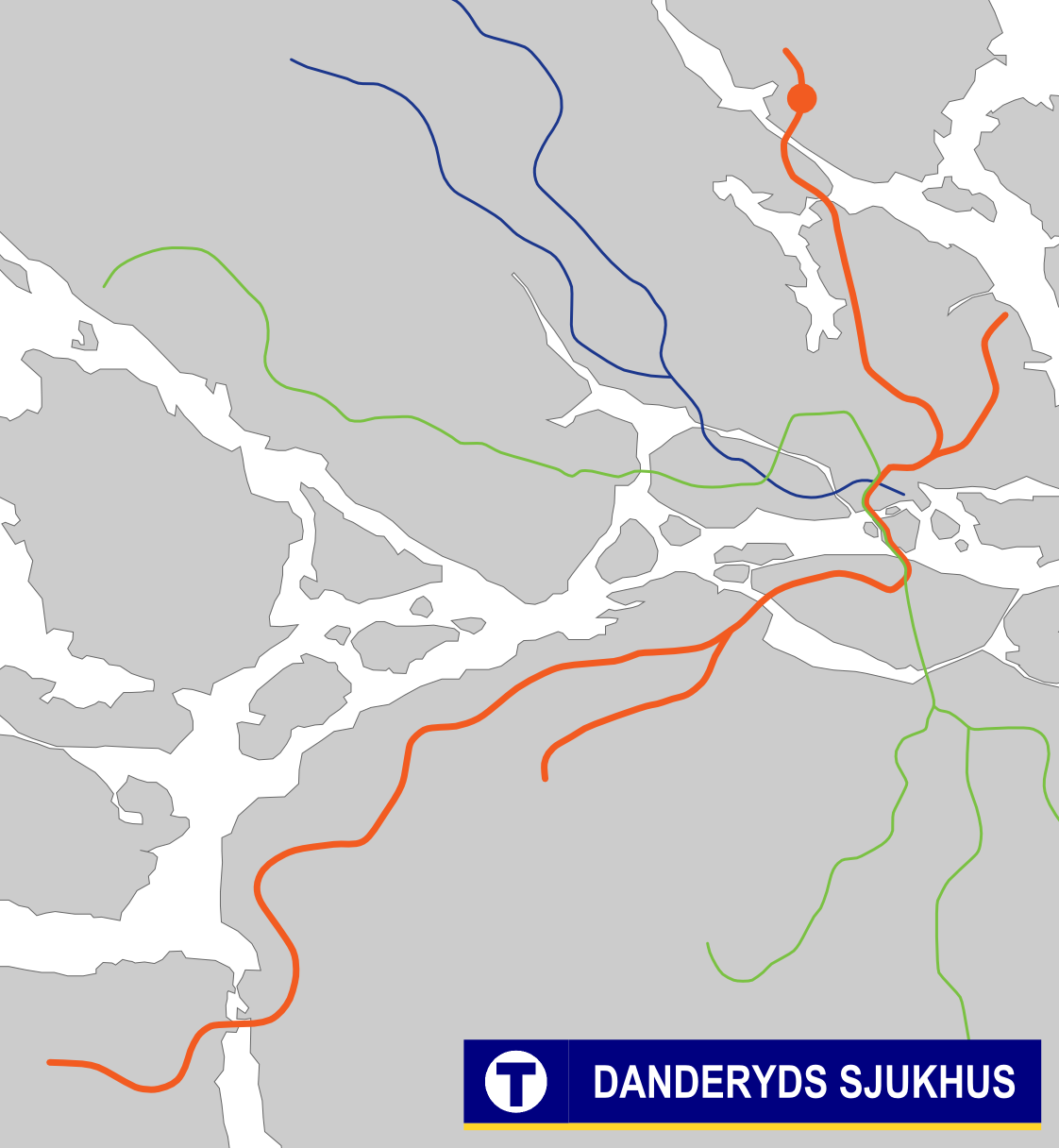

Danderyds sjukhus is a station on Line 14 of the Red Line of the Stockholm Metro, located at Danderyd Hospital in the suburban Danderyd Municipality, north of Stockholm, Sweden.

The station was opened on 29 January 1978 as part of the extension from Universitetet to Mörby centrum and serves the nearby Danderyd Hospital. The Mörby railway station on the Roslagsbanan is situated a few hundred metres from this station.
