= Mörby railway station =

Railway station in Danderyd, Sweden

Mörby
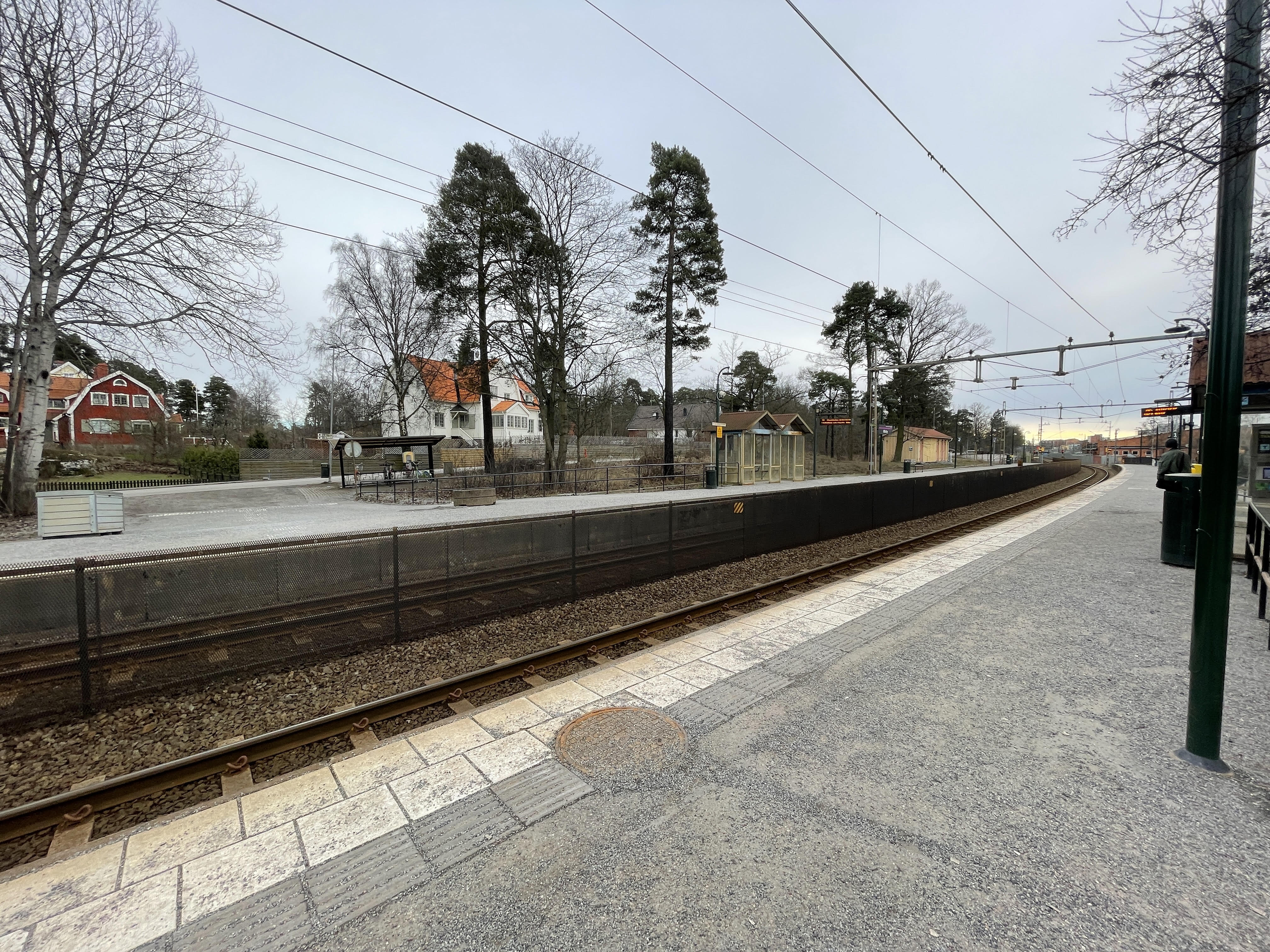

General information
- Location: Mörby, Danderyd, Stockholm County; Sweden
- Coordinates: 59°23′31″N 18°02′49″E
- Owner: Storstockholms Lokaltrafik
- Operator: Arriva
- Line: Roslagsbanan: 27, 28, 29
- Tracks: 2
- Connections: Bus: 176, 177, 178

History
- Opened: 1906

Passengers
- 2019: 2,400 boarding per weekday

Services
Preceding station	SL Local & Light Rail	Following station
Universitetet towards Stockholms östra	Roslagsbanan Line 27	Djursholms Ösby towards Kårsta
Universitetet towards Stockholms östra	Roslagsbanan Line 28	Djursholms Ösby towards Österskär
Stocksund towards Stockholms östra	Roslagsbanan Line 29	Djursholms Ösby towards Näsbypark
Location

Mörby railway station is a railway station on the Roslagsbanan 891 mm narrow gauge railway located in Danderyd Municipality northeast of Stockholm, Sweden.

Opened in 1906, the station is not directly adjacent to the nearby Danderyds sjukhus metro station (opened in 1978), but it is just a few hundred meters away from it, allowing for interchange by just a short walk.

The primary maintenance shop for Roslagsbanan, Mörby verkstäder, is located just south of the station.

== Gallery ==
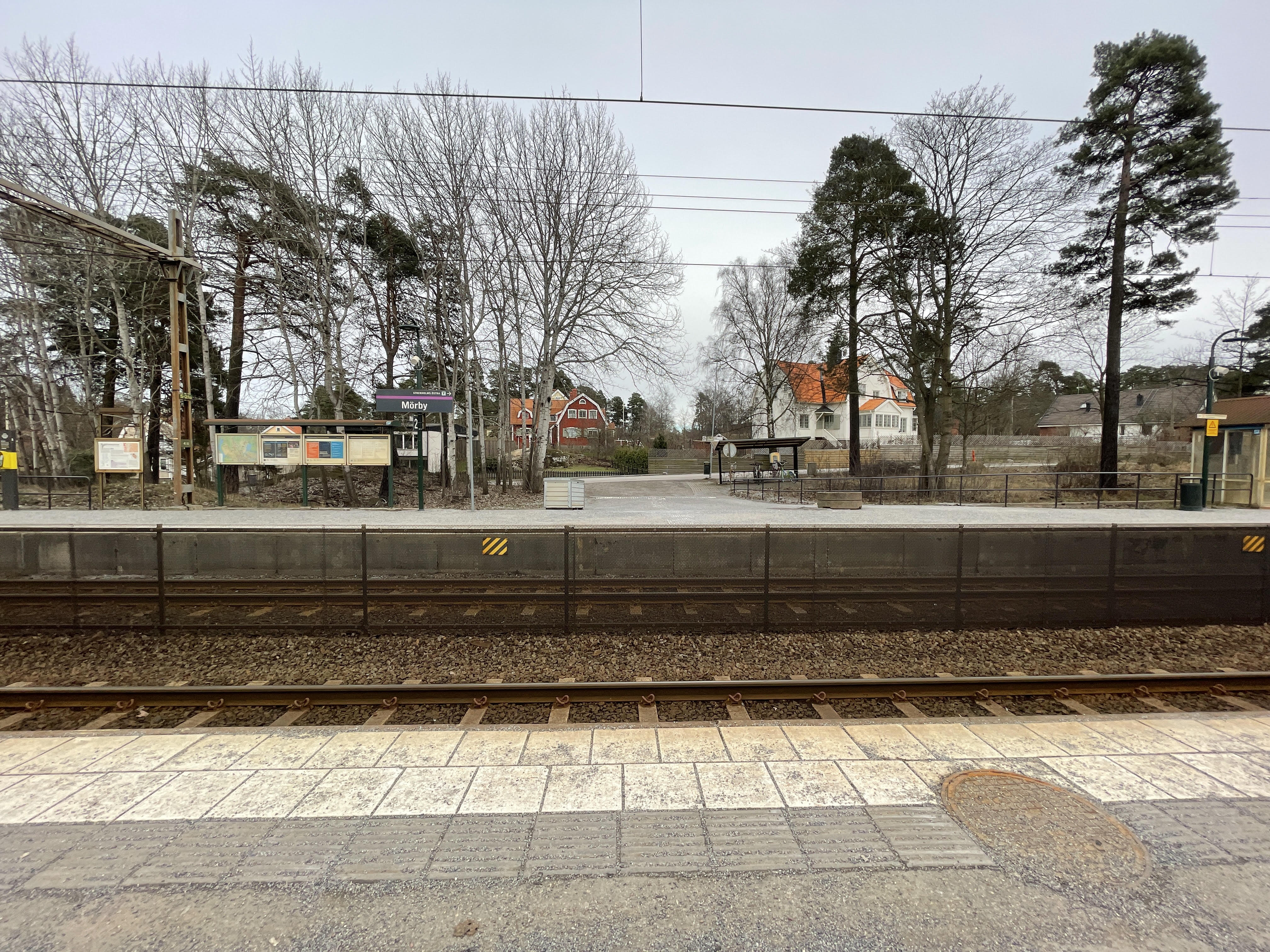

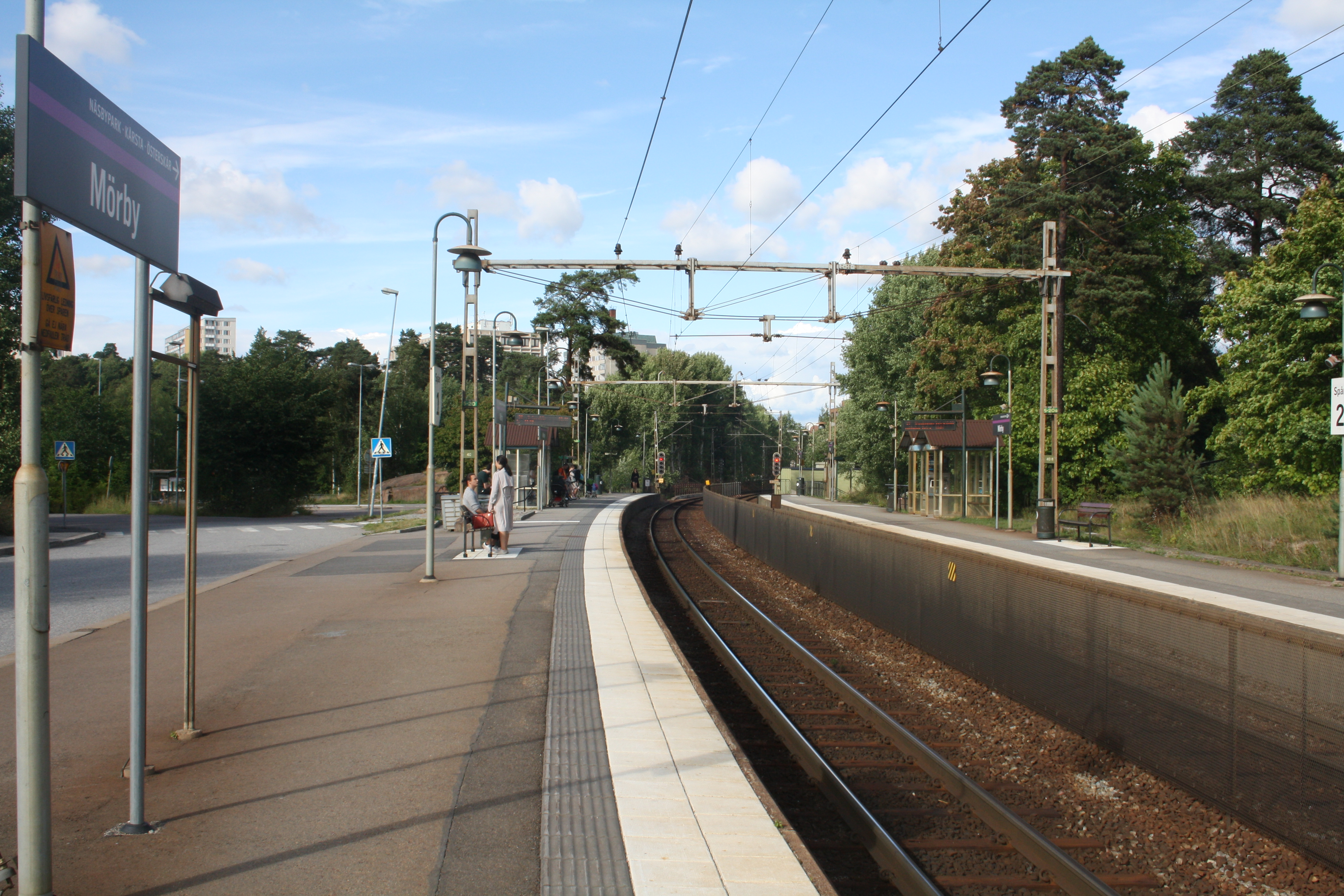

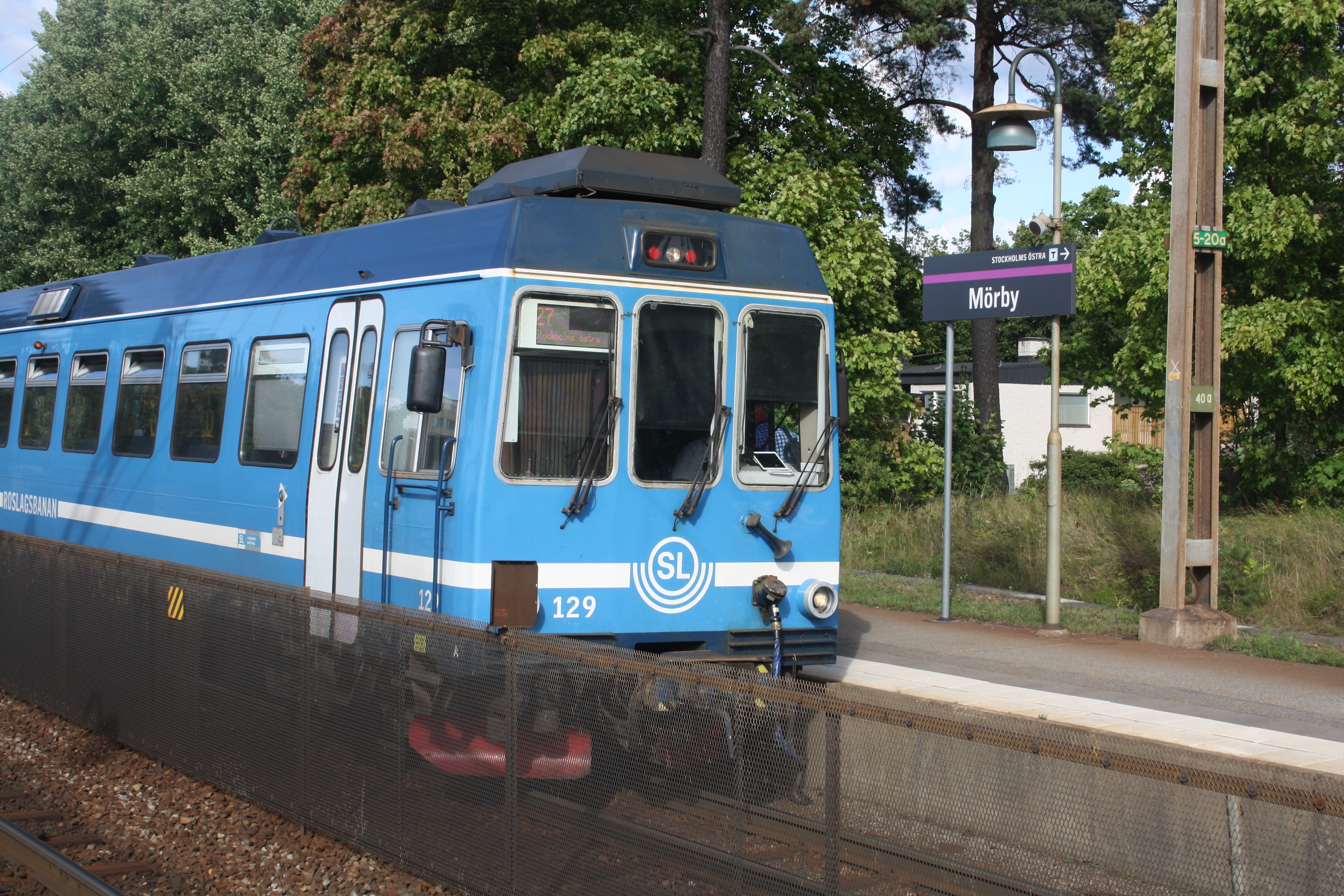

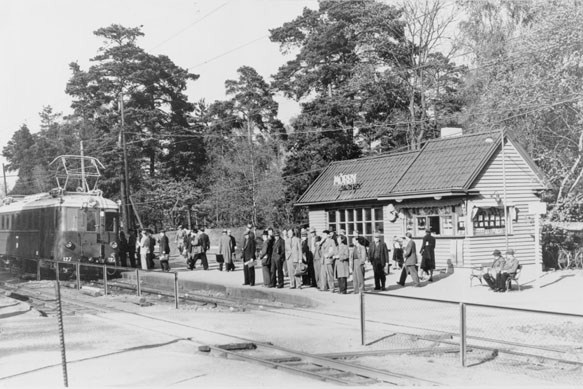

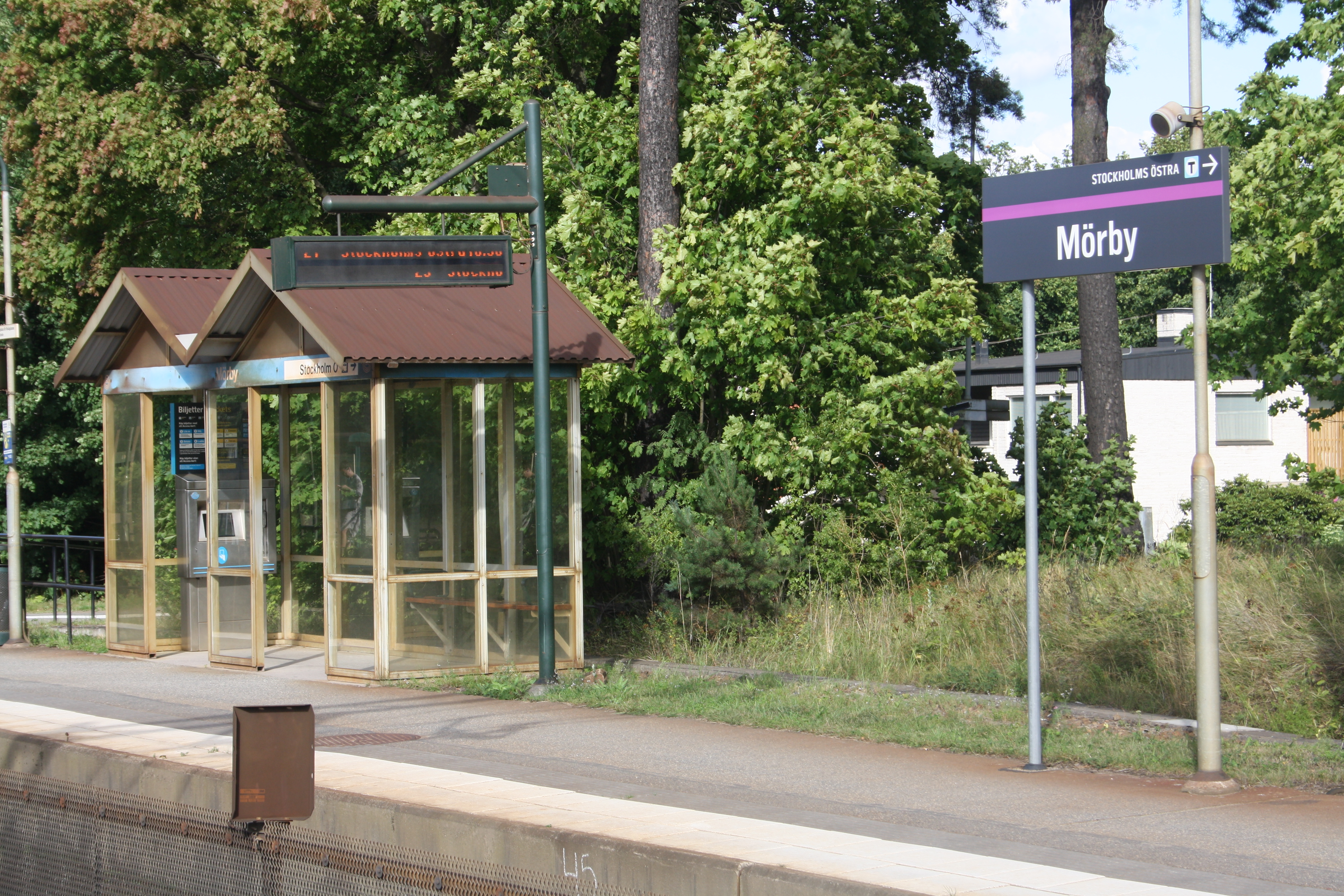
