= Bergshamra metro station =

Stockholm Metro station

Bergshamra
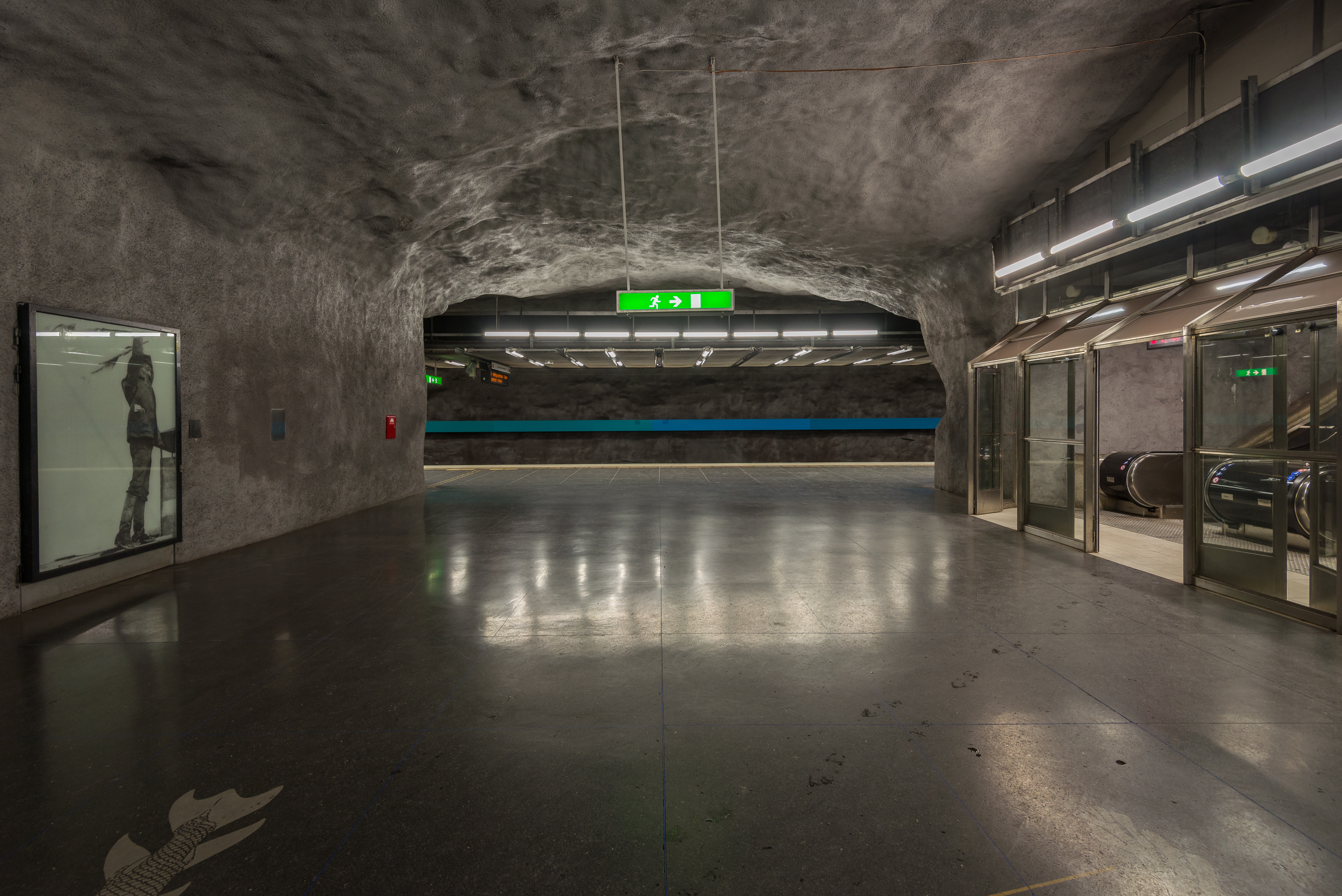

General information
- Coordinates: 59°22′53″N 18°02′11″E
- System: Stockholm Metro station
- Owner: Storstockholms Lokaltrafik
- Platforms: 1 island platform
- Tracks: 2

Construction
- Structure type: Underground
- Accessible: Yes

Other information
- Station code: BEH

History
- Opened: 29 January 1978; 48 years ago

Passengers
- 2019: 6,750 boarding per weekday

Services
| Preceding station | Stockholm Metro | Following station |
|---|---|---|
| Universitetet towards Fruängen | Line 14 | Danderyds sjukhus towards Mörby centrum |
Location
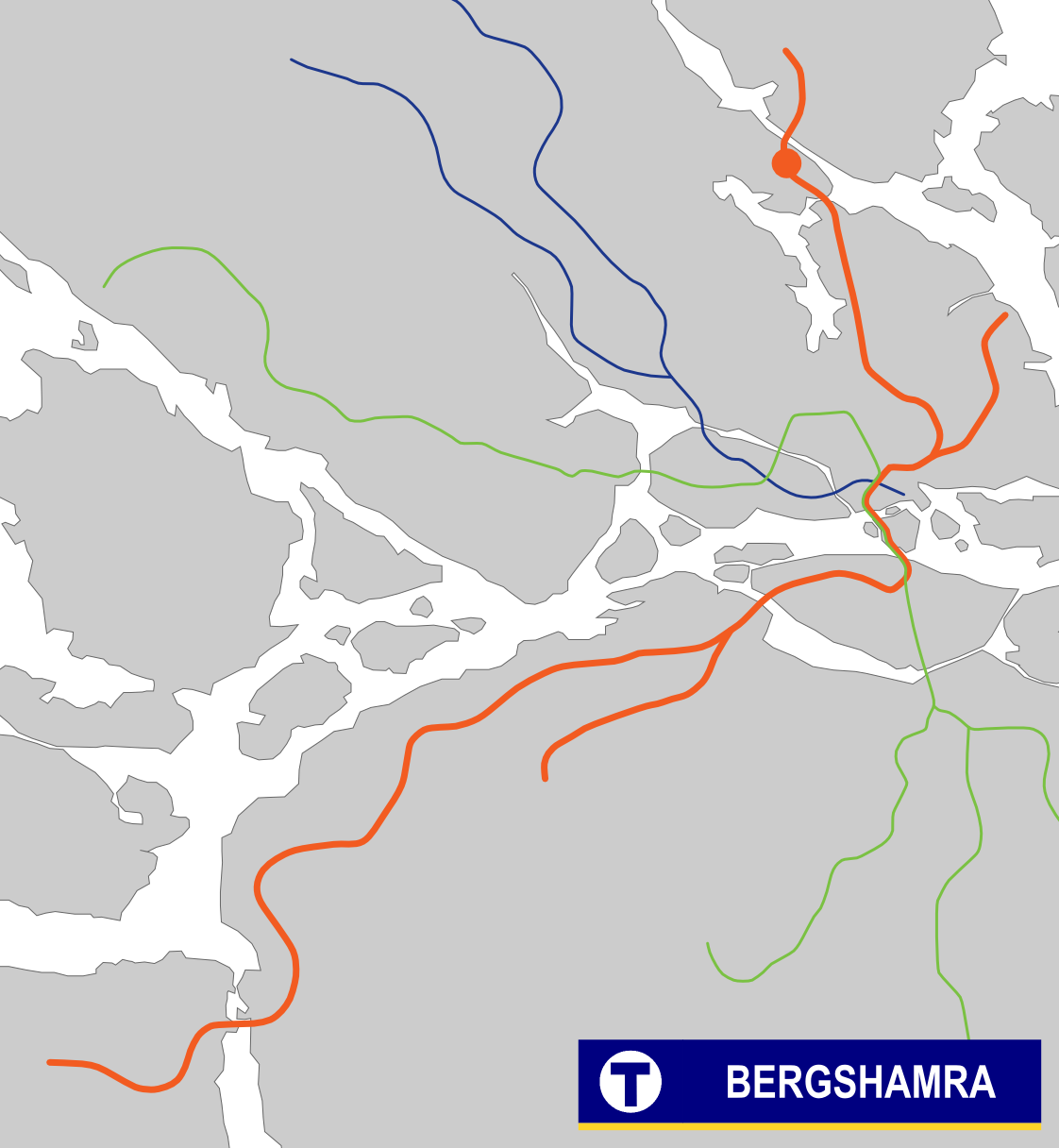

Bergshamra is a station on Line 14 of the Red Line of the Stockholm Metro, located in Bergshamra, Solna Municipality. The station was opened on 29 January 1978 as part of the extension from Universitetet to Mörby centrum.

== In popular culture ==
A stock photo of its elevators is featured at the cover art of Avicii's Levels single.

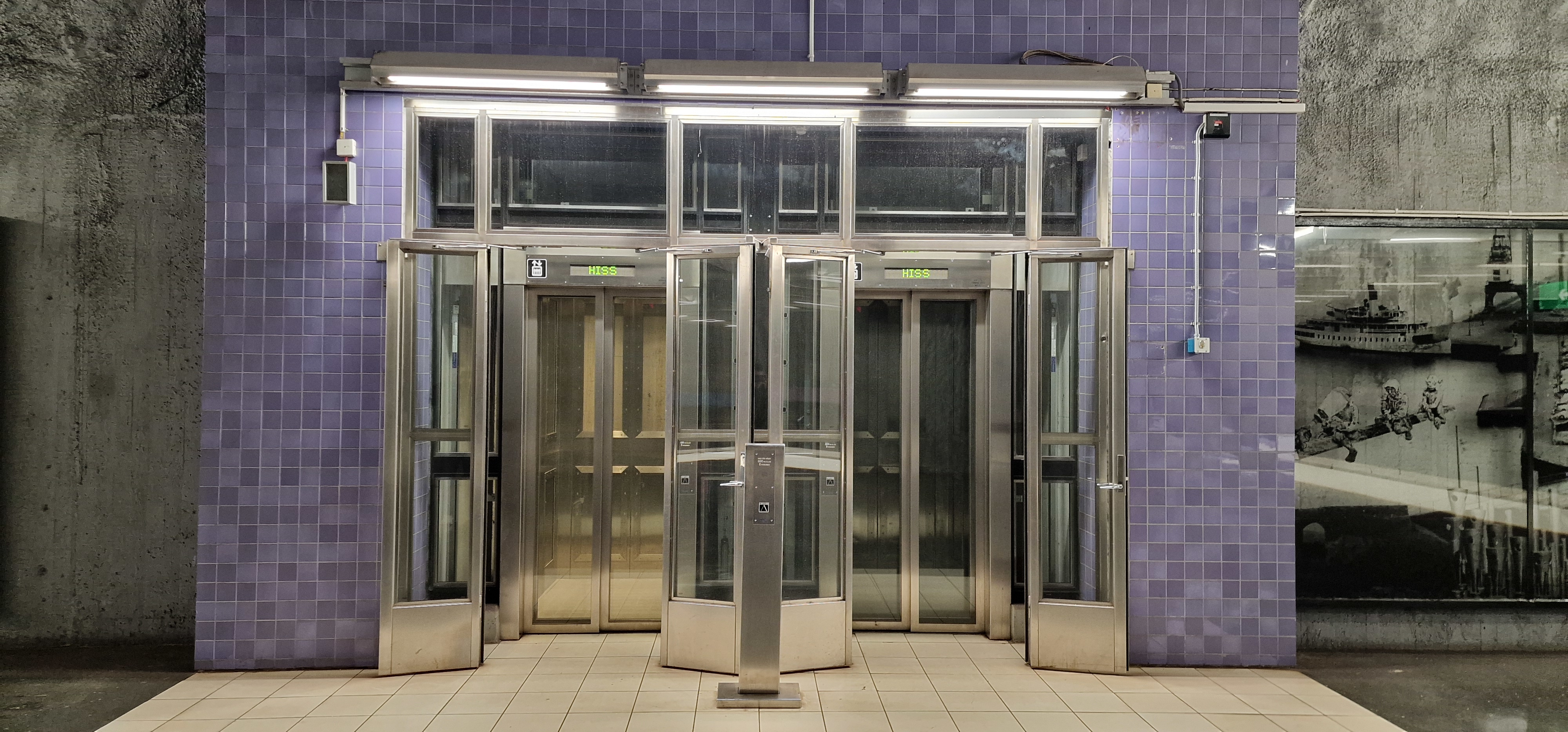
Bergshamra subway elevators, as of 2024
