= Mörby centrum =

Shopping mall in Danderyd Municipality, Sweden

Coordinates: 59°23′55″N 18°02′10″E

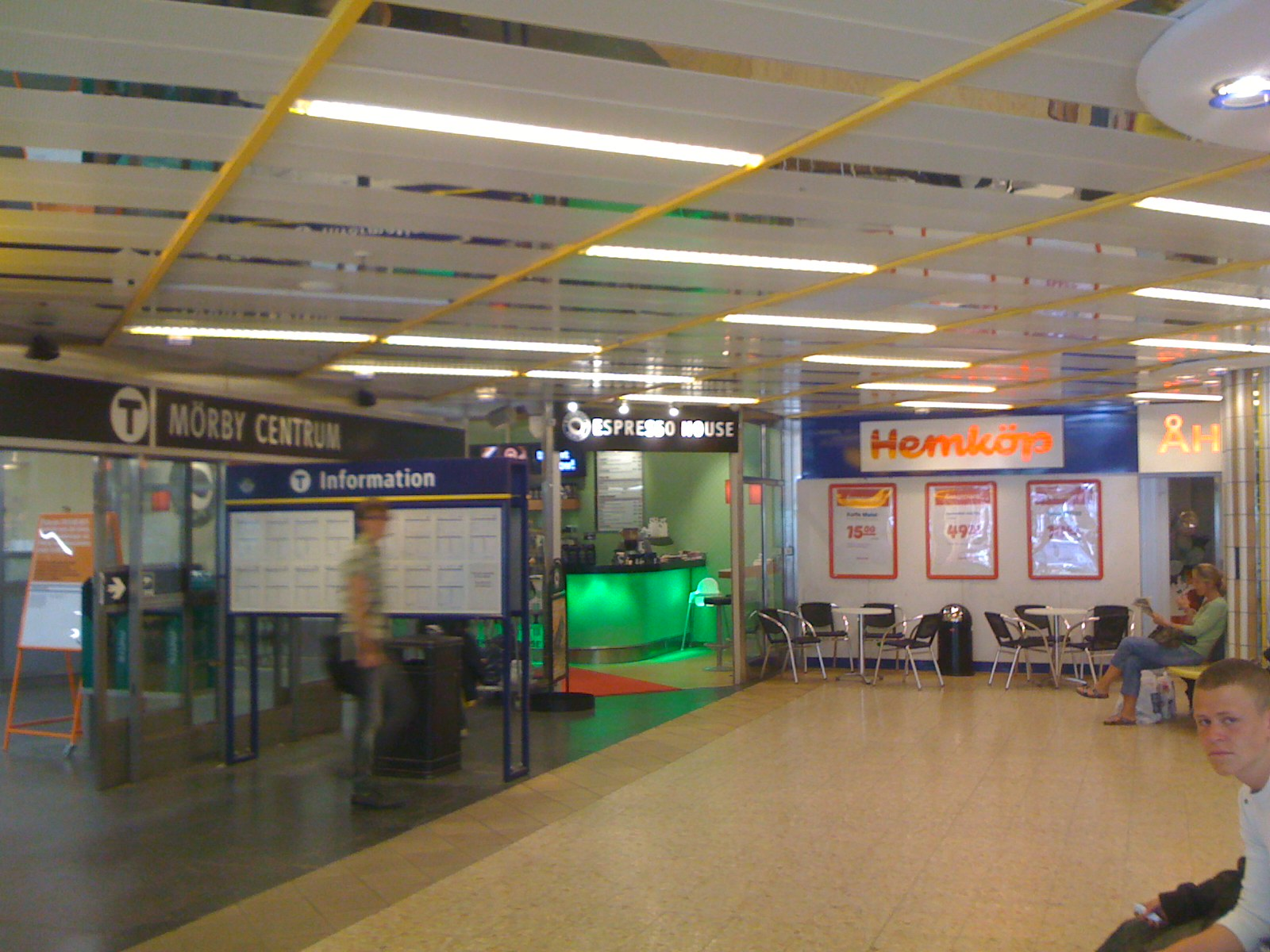
Metro station entrance inside the shopping mall

Mörby centrum is a shopping mall in the municipality of Danderyd north of Stockholm. It is also the name of a station of the Stockholm Metro accessed from the shopping mall. Mörby Centrum was built in 1961 by the architects Fors & Son and has since then been expanded in several steps. It was converted into an indoor shopping mall in 1977.

In May 2026 it was announced Mörby Centrum would change its name to Danderyds Centrum.

== See also ==
- Mörby centrum metro station
