= Bergianska trädgården =

Botanical garden in Stockholm, Sweden

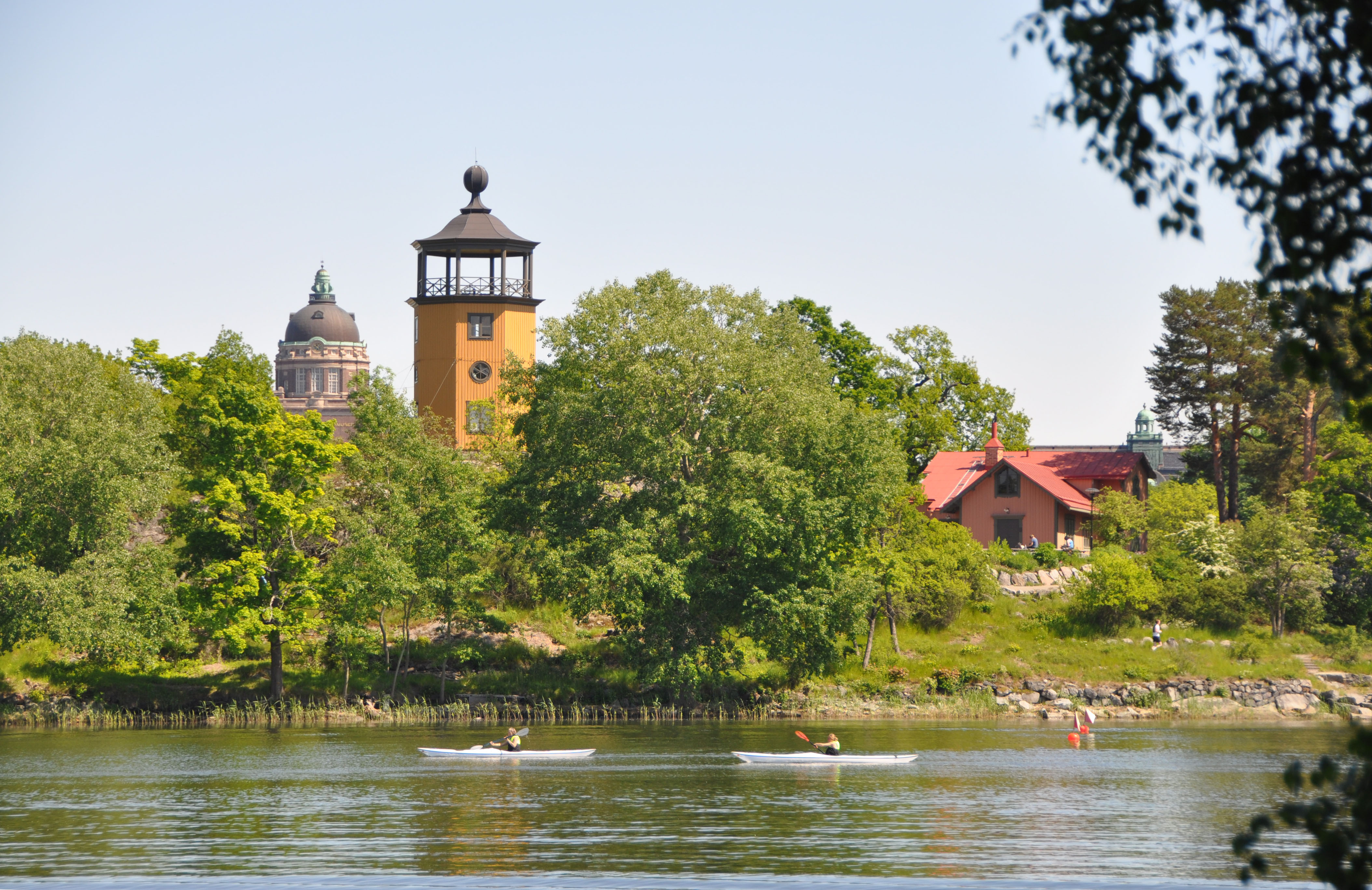
- View from Brunnsviken lake
- Interactive map of Bergianska trädgården
- Type: Botanical garden
- Location: Stockholm, Sweden
- Coordinates: 59.370°N 18.047°E
- Opened: 1791
- Website: www.bergianska.se/english/

The Bergianska trädgården, the Bergian Garden or Hortus Bergianus, is a botanical garden located in the Frescati area on the outskirts of Stockholm, close to the Swedish Museum of Natural History and the main campus of Stockholm University. The director of the garden is known as Professor Bergianus.

== History ==
The Garden was founded through a donation in 1791 by the historian and antiquarian Bengt Bergius and his brother Peter Jonas Bergius, a physician and scientist, for the Royal Swedish Academy of Sciences, and was originally located at their mansion and its adjacent garden on the Karlbergsvägen road, in what is now the Vasastaden district in central Stockholm. which at the time still had a largely rural character. The Garden was donated to the Royal Academy after the brothers' death in 1791, in accordance with their will. The first person to serve as director was Olof Swartz.

The garden was moved to its current location in 1885, because its original location was slated for construction. Today the garden is owned by the Swedish government and the Royal Swedish Academy of Sciences. It is jointly administered by the Academy of Sciences and Stockholm University.

== Professor Bergianus ==
- 1791–1818 Olof Swartz
- 1823–1856 Johan Emanuel Wikström
- 1857–1879 Nils Johan Andersson
- 1879–1914 Veit Brecher Wittrock
- 1915–1944 Robert Fries
- 1944–1965 Carl Rudolf Florin
- 1970–1983 Måns Ryberg (de facto 1966-1983)
- 1983–2001 Bengt Jonsell
- 2002–current Birgitta Bremer

== Pictures ==
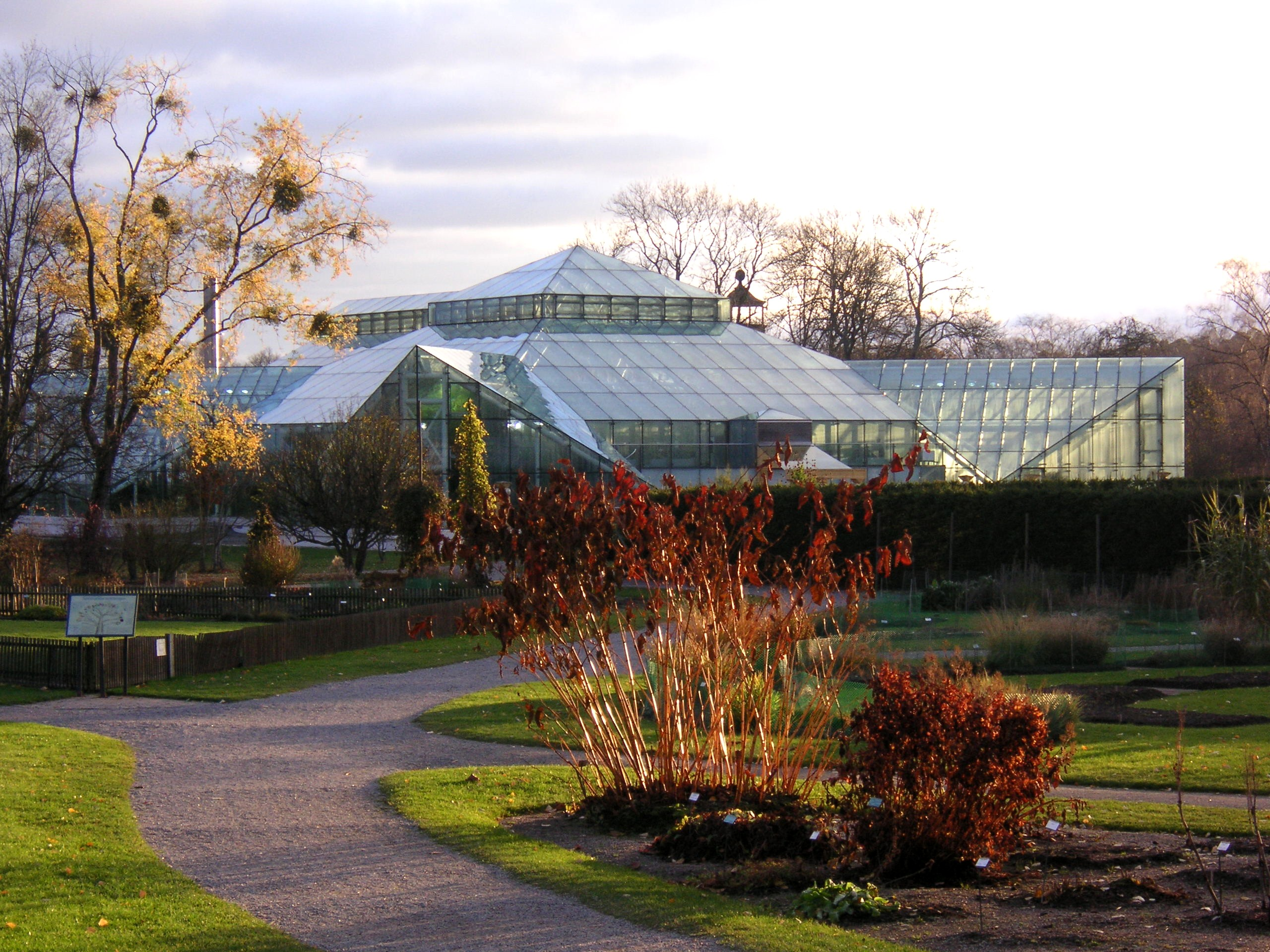
E. Anderson's greenhouse

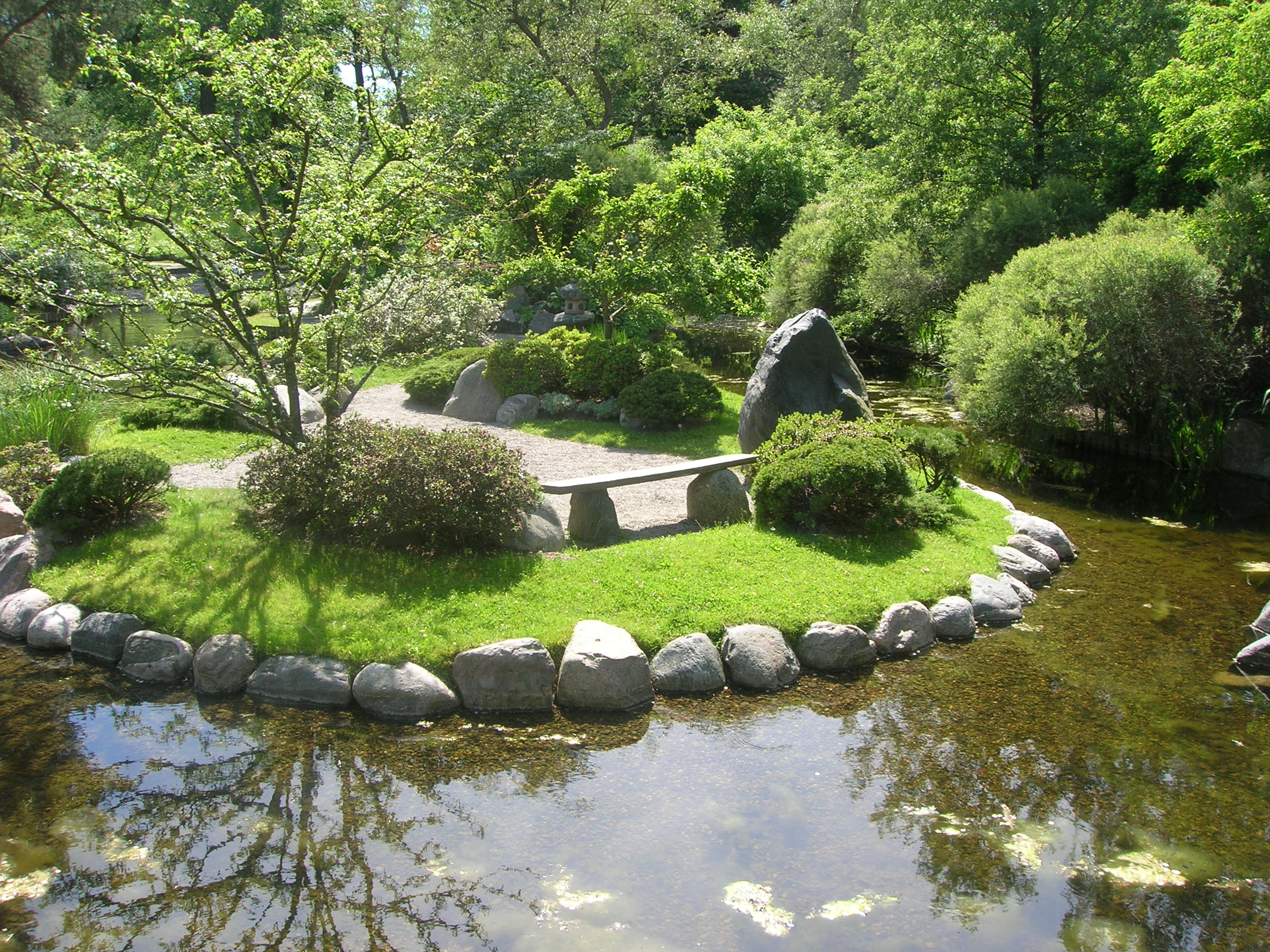
Japanese pond

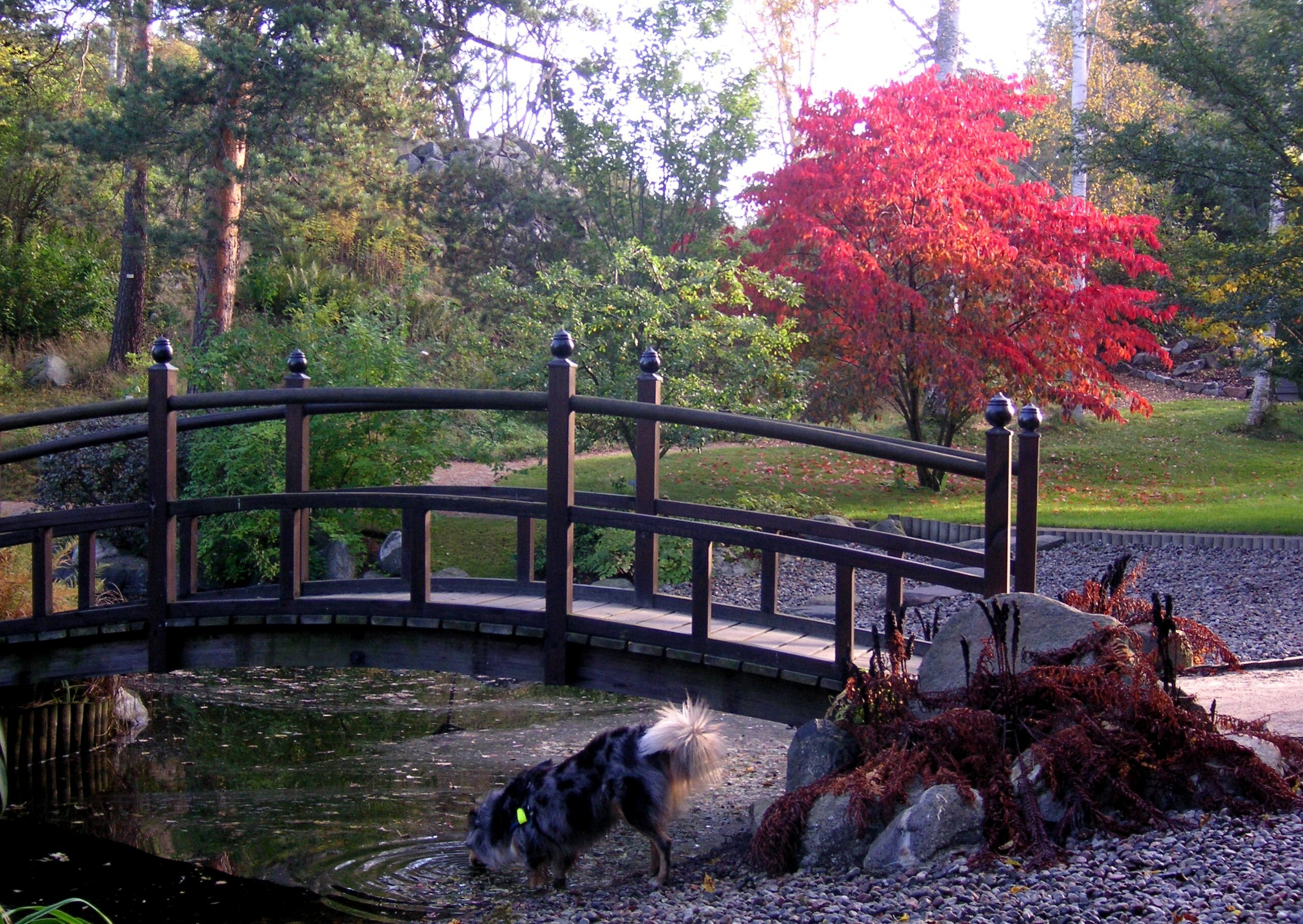
Japanese pond

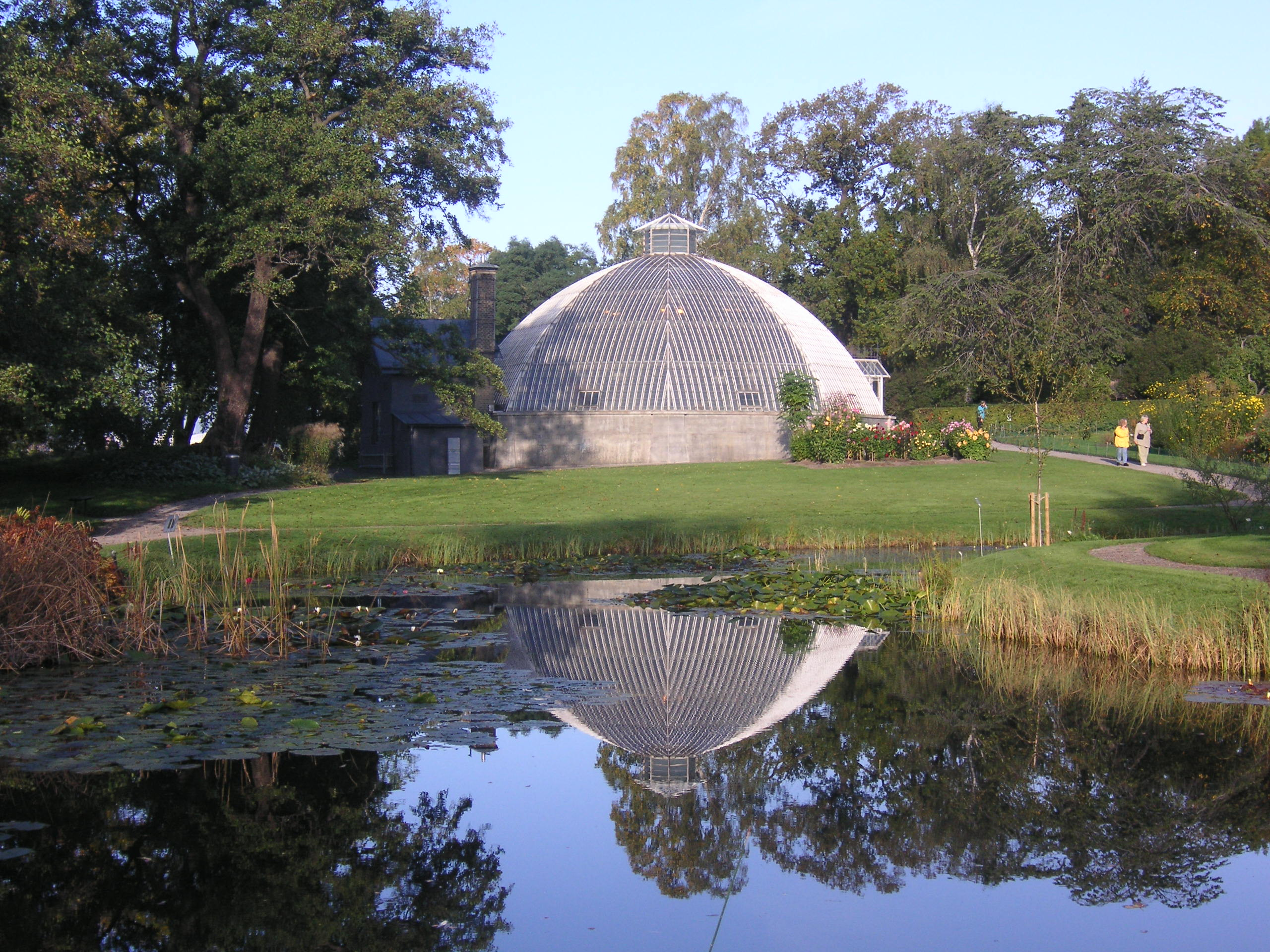
Victoria greenhouse

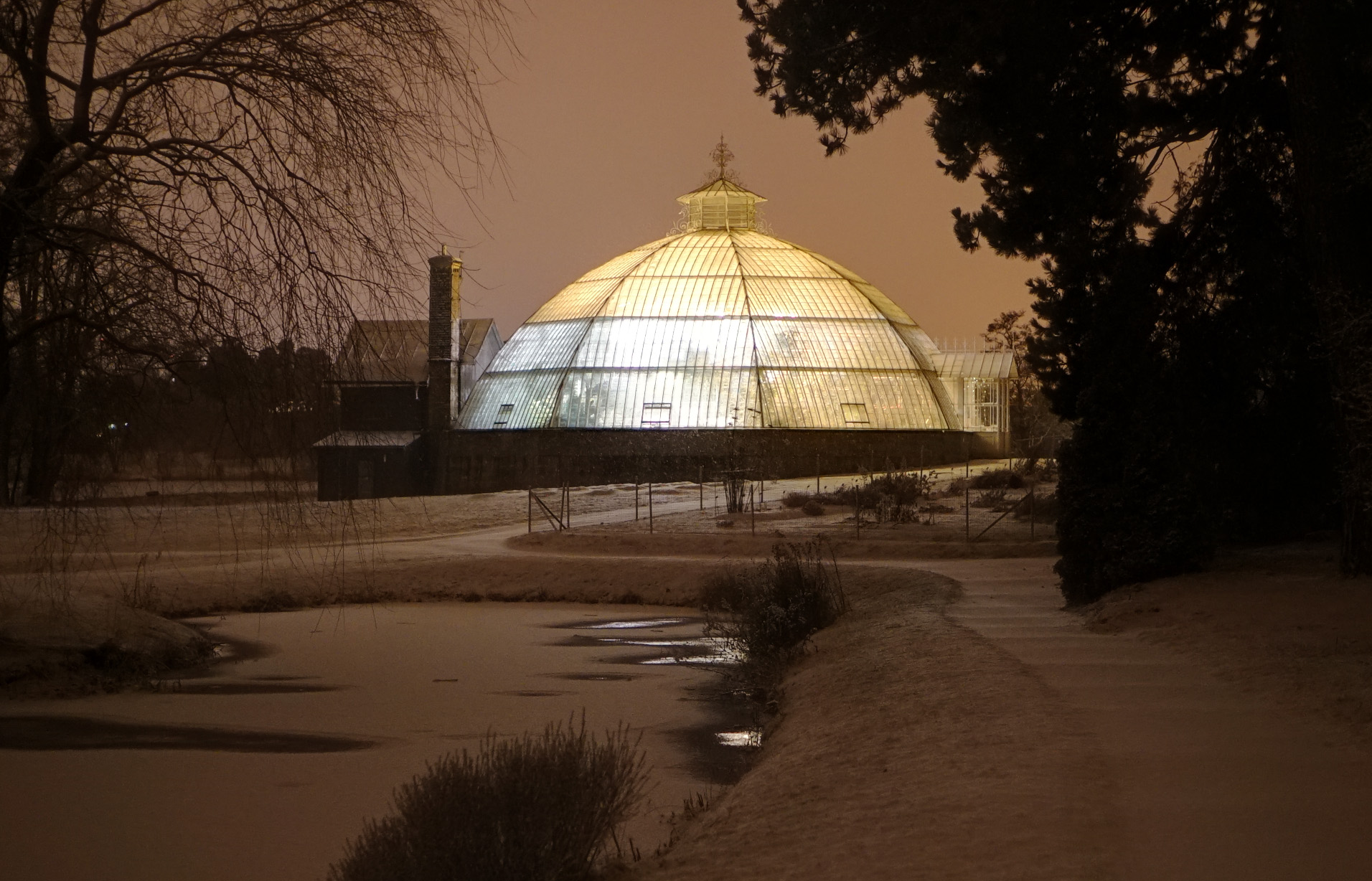
Victoria greenhouse
