= Carl Rudolf Florin =

Swedish botanist (1894–1965)

- Born: 5 April 1894; Solna, Sweden
- Died: 24 September 1965 (aged 71)
- Known for: Specialization in gymnosperms, both modern and fossil
- Awards: Linnean Society of London's Darwin-Wallace Medal (1958)
- Scientific career
- Fields: Botany
- Institutions: Bergius Botanic Garden

Carl Rudolf Florin (5 April 1894, in Solna – 24 September 1965) was a Swedish biologist botanist, specialising in gymnosperms, including both modern and fossil material.

He was Professor Bergianus from 1944 and a member of the Royal Swedish Academy of Sciences from 1947.

== Awards ==
He was awarded the Linnean Society of London's Darwin-Wallace Medal in 1958.

== Selected bibliography ==
- "On the geological history of the Sciadopitineae." Svensk Bot. Tidskr. 16 (2): 260-270 (1922).
- "Die Koniferengattung Libocedrus Endl. in Ostasien." Svensk Bot. Tidskr. 24 (1): 117-131 (1930).
- "Pilgerodendron, eine neue Koniferengattung aus Süd-Chile." Svensk Bot. Tidskr. 24 (1): 132-135 (1930).
- "Untersuchungen zur Stammesgeschichte der Coniferales und Cordaitales. Erster Teil: Morphologie und Epidermisstruktur der Assimilationsorgane bei den rezenten Koniferen." Kongl. Svenska Vetenskapsakad. Handl. 10 (1) 1-588 (1931).
- "Die Koniferen des Oberkarbons und des unteren Perms." Palaeontographica B 85: 1-729 (1938–1945).
- "Evolution in Cordaites and Conifers." Acta Hort. Berg. 15 (2): 285-388 (1951).
- "On Metasequoia, living and fossil." Bot. Not. 1 (105): 1-29 (1952).
- "Nomenclatural notes on genera of living gymnosperms." Taxon 5 (8): 188-192 (1956).
- "The distribution of Conifer and Taxad genera in Time and Space." Acta Hort. Berg. 20 (4): 121-312 (1963).
- "The distribution of Conifer and Taxad genera in Time and Space; additions and corrections." Acta Hort. Berg. 20 (6): 319-326 (1966).
