= Danderyd Hospital =

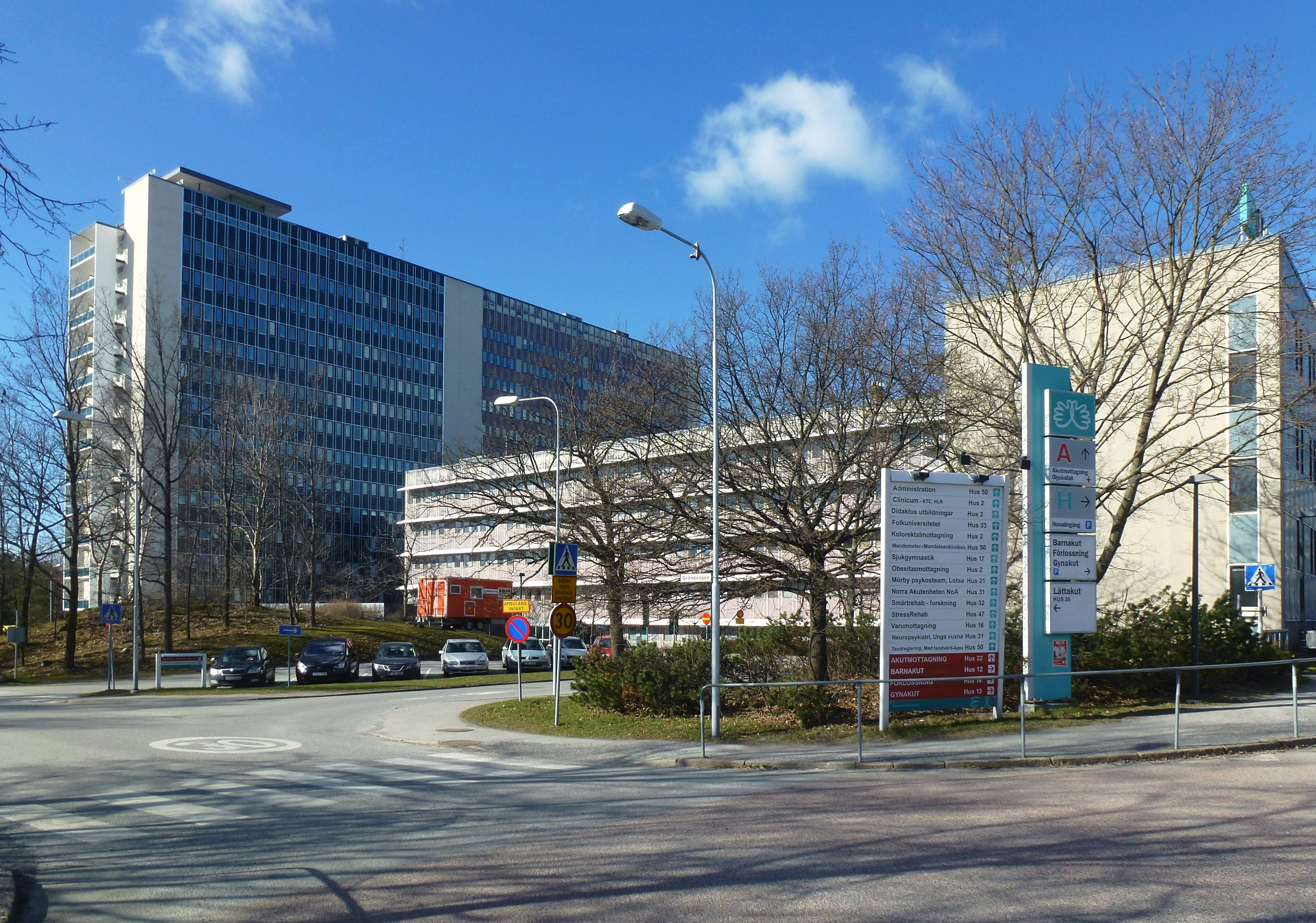
- Danderyd Hospital in 2014

Geography
- Location: Stocksund, Danderyd Municipality, Stockholm County, Sweden
- Coordinates: 59°23′31″N 18°02′24″E

Organisation
- Type: District General, Teaching
- Affiliated university: Karolinska Institutet

Services
- Emergency department: Yes
- Beds: 536

Helipads
- Helipad: Yes

History
- Founded: 2 January 1922

Links
- Lists: Hospitals in Sweden

Danderyd Hospital (Swedish: Danderyds sjukhus) is a teaching hospital in Stocksund, Danderyd Municipality, in northern Greater Stockholm, Sweden, which opened in 1922. Until 1964 it was called Centrallasarettet i Stocksund.

Danderyd Hospital is one of Sweden's largest emergency hospitals and provides university healthcare distributed across twelve operational areas. Annually, the hospital receives approximately 90,000 emergency patients, 429,000 outpatient visits and 50,000 inpatient visits, and performs 6,300 deliveries. In collaboration with the Karolinska Institutet (KIDS), education and research is conducted around the most common public diseases. Annually, roughly 2,000 students from roughly 100 different institutions of higher learning are welcomed in about 30 different educational programs. The hospital was founded in 1922 as Stockholm County's central hospital in Mörby and was renamed in 1964 to Danderyd Hospital. Danderyds Sjukhus AB is a wholly owned company within Region Stockholm and has around 4,500 employees.

== Notable births ==
- Princess Sofia, Duchess of Värmland (born 6 December 1984) – wife of Prince Carl Philip, Duke of Värmland.
- Prince Alexander, Duke of Södermanland (born 19 April 2016) – son of Prince Carl Philip, Duke of Värmland and Princess Sofia, Duchess of Värmland.
- Prince Gabriel, Duke of Dalarna (born 31 August 2017) – son of Prince Carl Philip, Duke of Värmland and Princess Sofia, Duchess of Värmland.
- Prince Julian, Duke of Halland (born 26 March 2021) – son of Prince Carl Philip, Duke of Värmland and Princess Sofia, Duchess of Värmland.
- Princess Ines, Duchess of Västerbotten (born 7 February 2025) – daughter of Prince Carl Philip, Duke of Värmland and Princess Sofia, Duchess of Värmland.
- Prince Nicolas, Duke of Ångermanland (born 15 June 2015) – son of Princess Madeleine, Duchess of Hälsingland and Gästrikland and Christopher O’Neill.
- Princess Adrienne, Duchess of Blekinge (born 9 March 2018) – daughter of Princess Madeleine, Duchess of Hälsingland and Gästrikland and Christopher O’Neill.
- Linda and Christian Ulvaeus – daughter and son of ABBA's Agnetha Fältskog and Björn Ulvaeus.

== See also ==
- Danderyds sjukhus metro station
