= Experimentalfältet =

Coordinates: 59°21′48″N 18°03′35″E

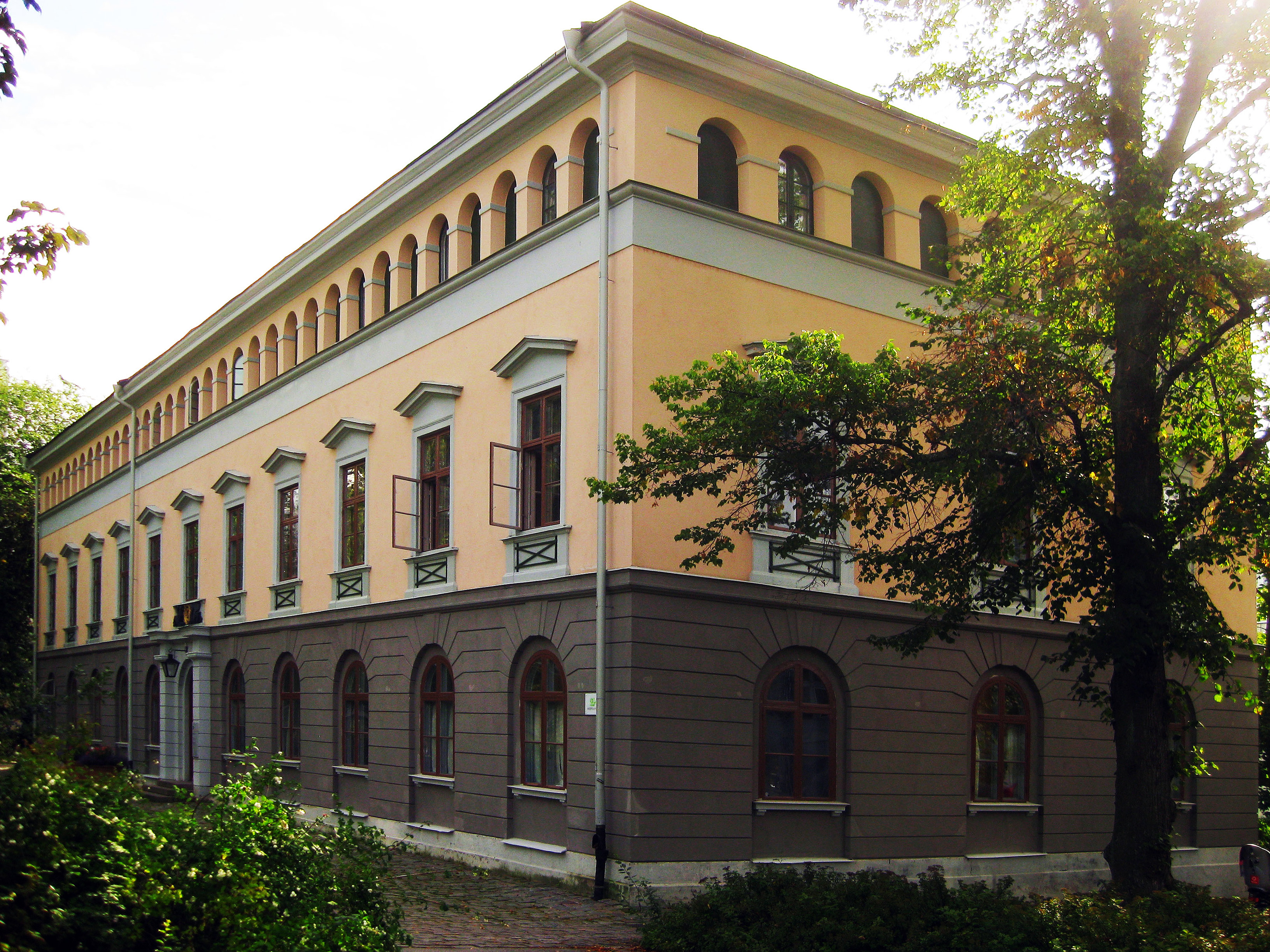
Fredrik Blom's house was erected at Experimentalfältet. It is now used for the central administration of Stockholm University.

Experimentalfältet ("the field for experiments") was an area in Frescati in northern Stockholm that was used by the Royal Swedish Academy of Agriculture and Forestry from the early 19th century until the 1960s. In the 1960s its mission was changed, when the new campus of Stockholm University was installed on the fields. The former Roslagsbanan railway station Universitetet used to be called Experimentalfältet but changed its name when the university had been established there.

The activities of the Academy of Agriculture and Forestry was transferred to an area in Ultuna outside Uppsala.

== Sources ==
- Stockholm University: description of premises (in Swedish)
- Stockholmskallan: archive photo (in Swedish)
- KSLA: history of Experimentalfältet (in Swedish)
- Swedish National Heritage Board: listing (in Swedish)
