= Karin Ek (artist) =

Swedish artist

- Born: 1944; Stockholm, Sweden
- Website: karinek.se

Karin Ek, is a Swedish artist, known for her paintings of double-face gestures. She did her master at the Royal University of fine arts in 1973–79, and she made the decorations accessorizing Mörby Subway Station in Stockholm, Sweden.
