= Stockholms östra railway station =

Railway station in Stockholm, Sweden

Stockholms östra
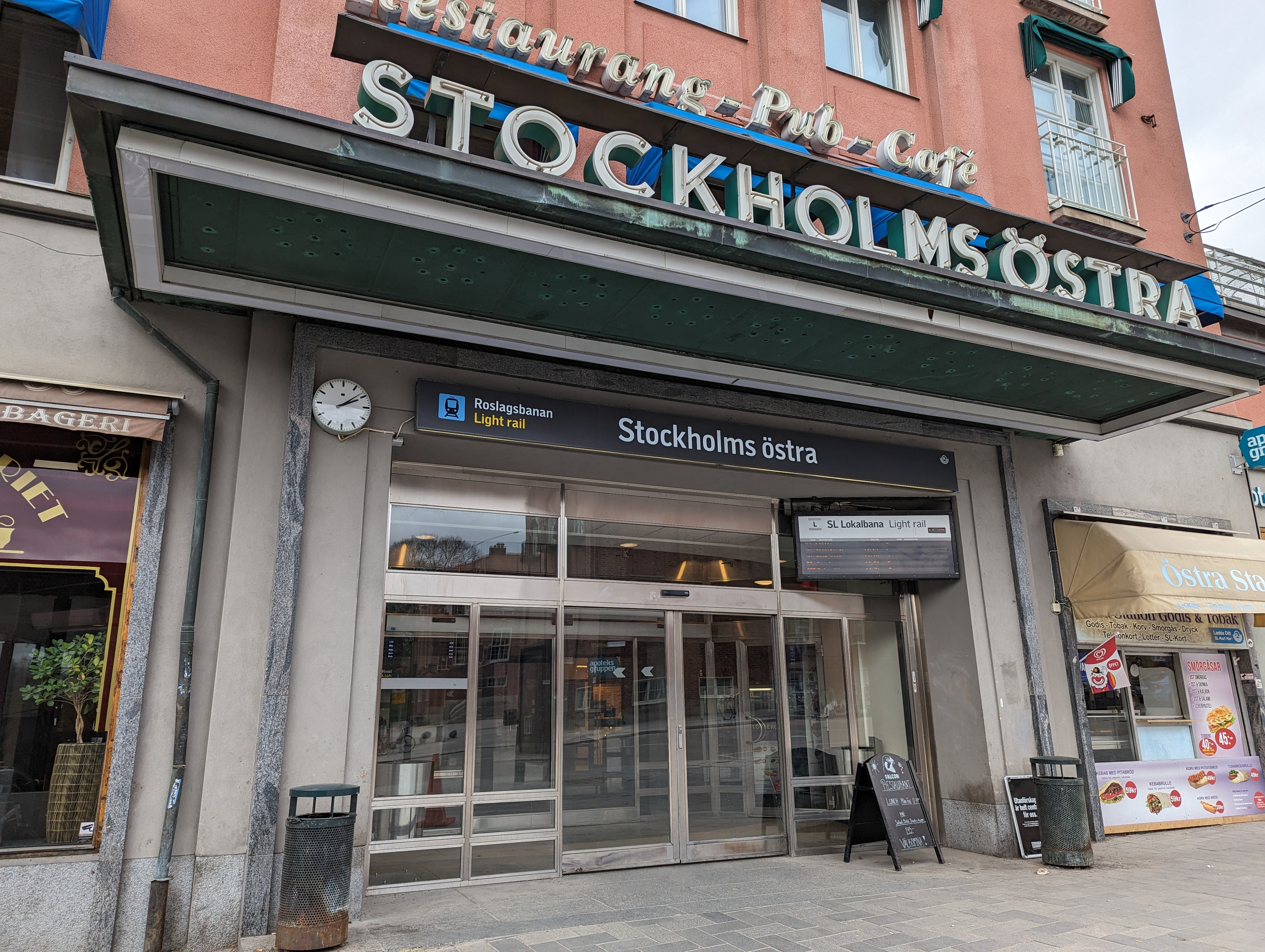
- The Drottning Kristinas Väg entrance to the station

General information
- Other names: Stockholm east railway station
- Location: Stockholm, Sweden
- Coordinates: 59°20′46″N 18°4′17″E
- Elevation: 26 m (85 ft) AMSL
- Owner: Storstockholms Lokaltrafik (SL)
- Operator: Transdev for SL
- Line: Roslagsbanan: 27, 28, 29
- Platforms: 3
- Tracks: 6
- Connections: Tekniska högskolan (Stockholm Metro)

Construction
- Architect: Albin Stark (1932 building)

History
- Opened: 1884; October 7, 1932 (current building)

Passengers
- 2019: 15,900 boarding per weekday

Services
Preceding station	SL Local & Light Rail	Following station
Terminus	Roslagsbanan Line 27	Universitetet towards Kårsta
Terminus	Roslagsbanan Line 28	Universitetet towards Österskär
Terminus	Roslagsbanan Line 29	Universitetet towards Näsbypark
Location
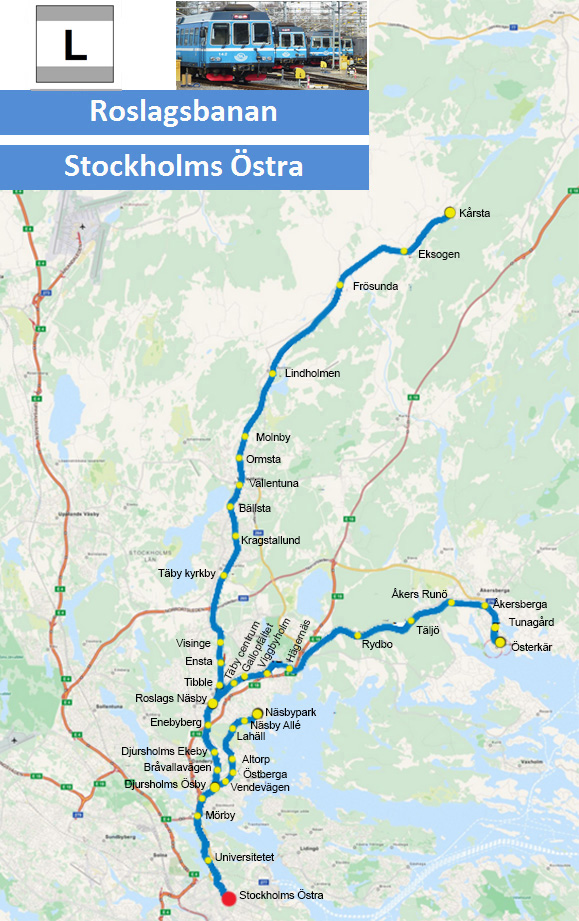

Stockholms östra railway station (abbreviated Stockholm Ö) is a railway station in Stockholm, Sweden. It serves as the terminus for the Roslagsbanan narrow-gauge railway system.

Located on Drottning Kristinas Väg and Valhallavägen Östermalm in eastern central Stockholm, the station is situated near KTH Royal Institute of Technology and is adjacent to Tekniska högskolan metro station. The station features six tracks and three platforms.

Stockholms östra station is also transport hub for Stockholm, with connections to the Stockholm Metro, city buses, and regional SL buses to Stockholm County's north-eastern municipalities such as Norrtälje and Vaxholm.

== History ==
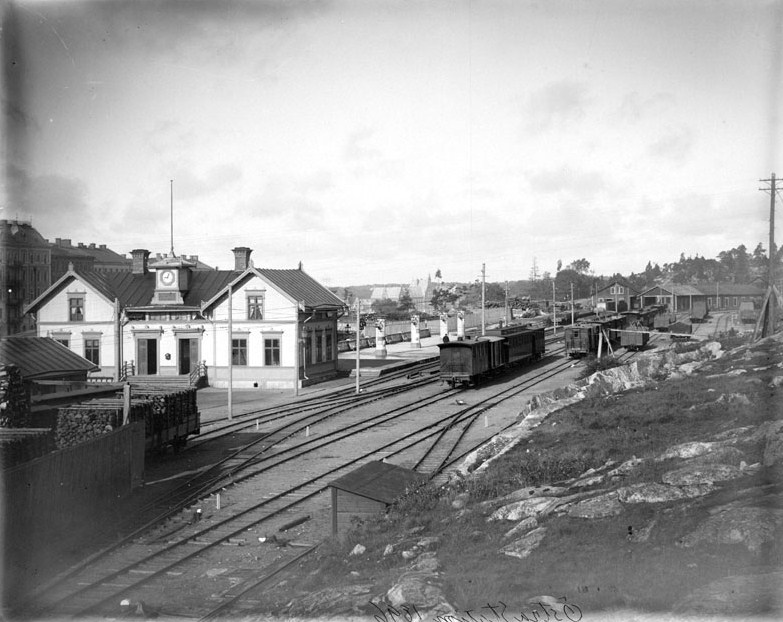
The station in 1896

The station's history dates back to 1884, when a provisional wooden station was established near the intersection of Odengatan and Valhallavägen. This temporary structure served as Stockholm Östra's station for nearly 50 years. The original plans to locate the station near Lill-Jans Plan were altered due to Stockholm city's demand for space to construct a "border boulevard," now known as Valhallavägen. As a result, the station was built on higher, more rugged terrain.

In 1932, the current station building at Valhallavägen was inaugurated, designed by Albin Stark to replace the old wooden structure. The new building also became the headquarters of SRJ (AB Storstockholms Lokaltrafiks Järnvägar), the company managing the Roslagsbanan at the time.

The circular entrance hall features ceiling paintings by Ewald Dahlskog, while the upper floor houses a restaurant that retains its original 1930s interior. This restaurant has become a cherished location, particularly among supporters of the sports club Djurgårdens IF, due to its proximity to the Stockholm Olympic Stadium, the former home ground of Djurgårdens IF football team.

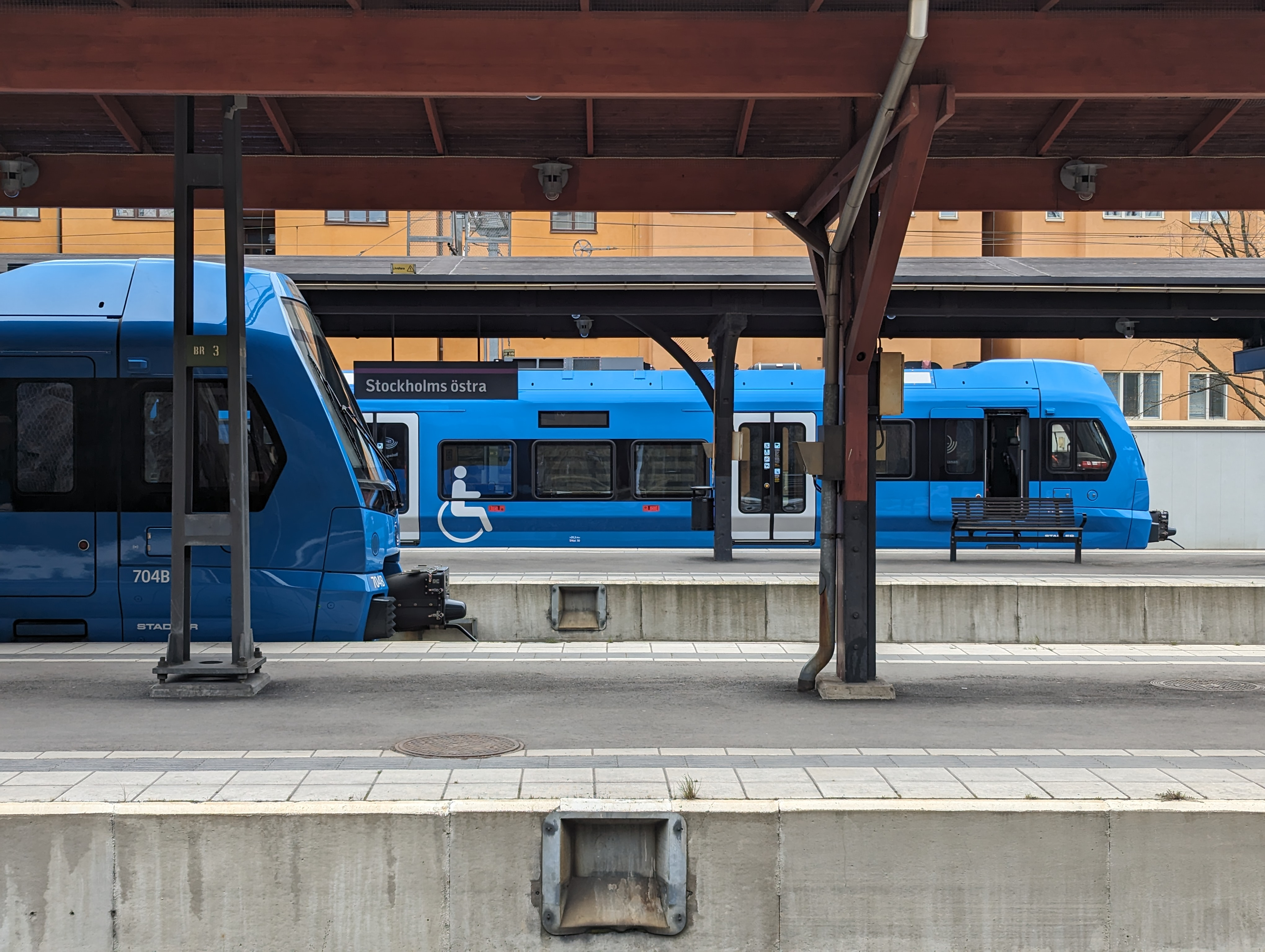
Trains at Stockholm östra in 2024

Until 1960, some trains from the station continued along a tram line to Engelbrektsplan, near Humlegården. Today, Stockholm Östra serves as the southern terminus for all Roslagsbanan lines. It is located adjacent to the Stockholm Metro station Tekniska högskolan which opened in 1973.

The station has also been featured in popular culture, serving as the backdrop for the 2011 Swedish movie Stockholm Östra, starring Mikael Persbrandt and Iben Hjejle.

== Future ==
Roslagsbanan is planned to be diverted to a new terminus at T-Centralen, where all lines of the Stockholm Metro intersect. This extension will involve constructing a new track alignment south of Universitetet station, with stops at Odenplan and T-Centralen.

The closure of Stockholm Östra and the re-routing of Roslagsbanan are part of the larger Stockholm Agreement negotiations, which aim to improve public transport connectivity across the city. On June 13 and 14, 2017, Region Stockholm approved the funding and implementation of this plan.

In September 2024, the location study for this new alignment was finalised, and plans were announced to build the new railway in a tunnel starting near Albano. Once the extension is completed, Stockholm Östra will be closed as a terminus, and the stretch of track to the station will be dismantled to make way for approximately 500 new apartments.

== Gallery ==
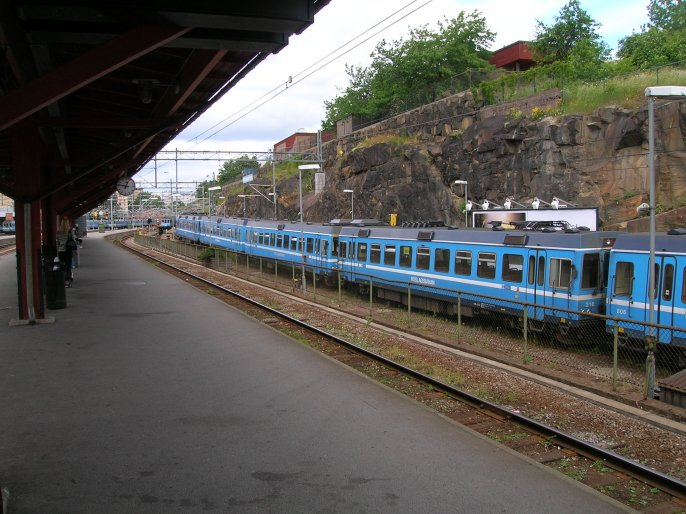
Platform 5 during daytime

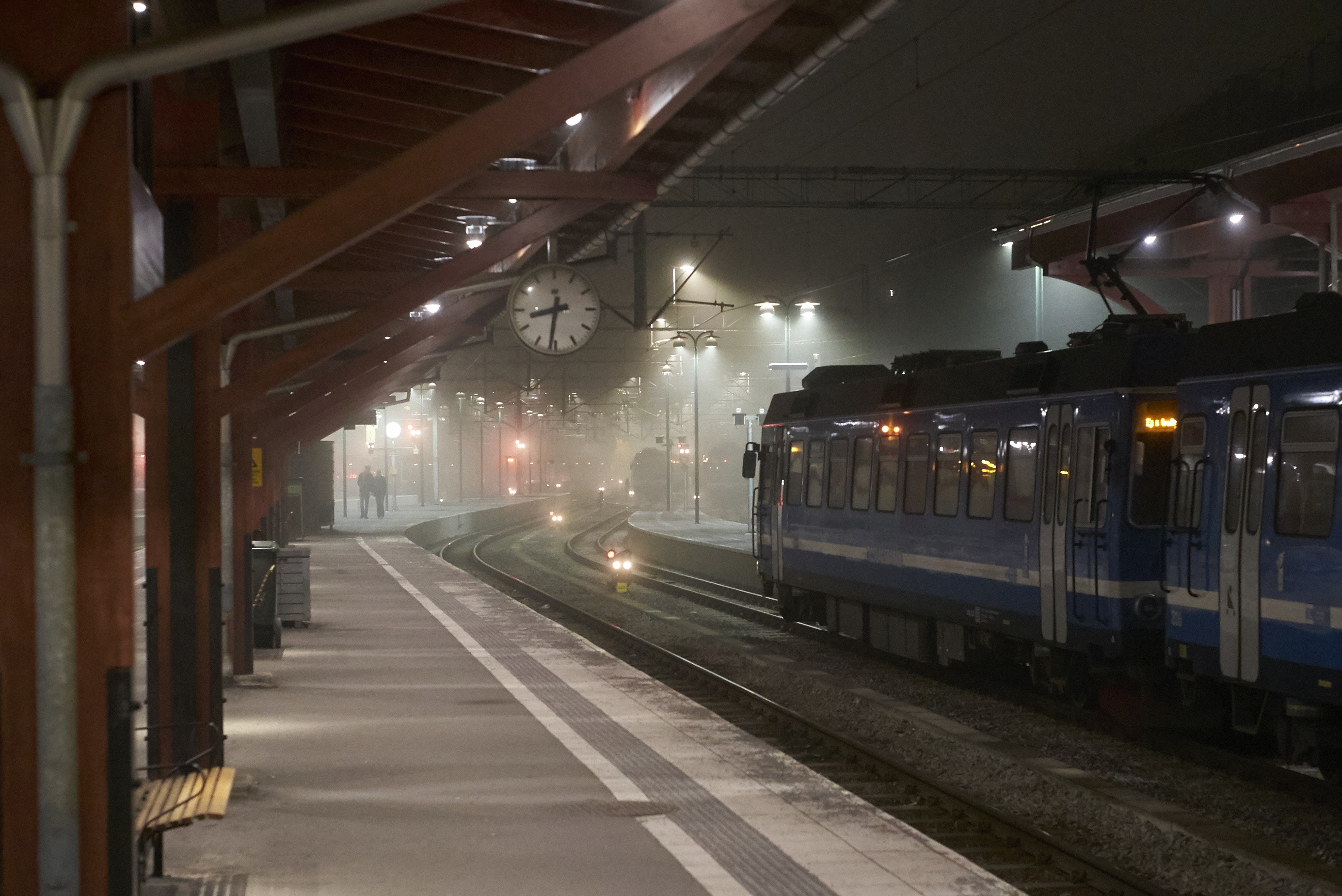
Platform 5 at night

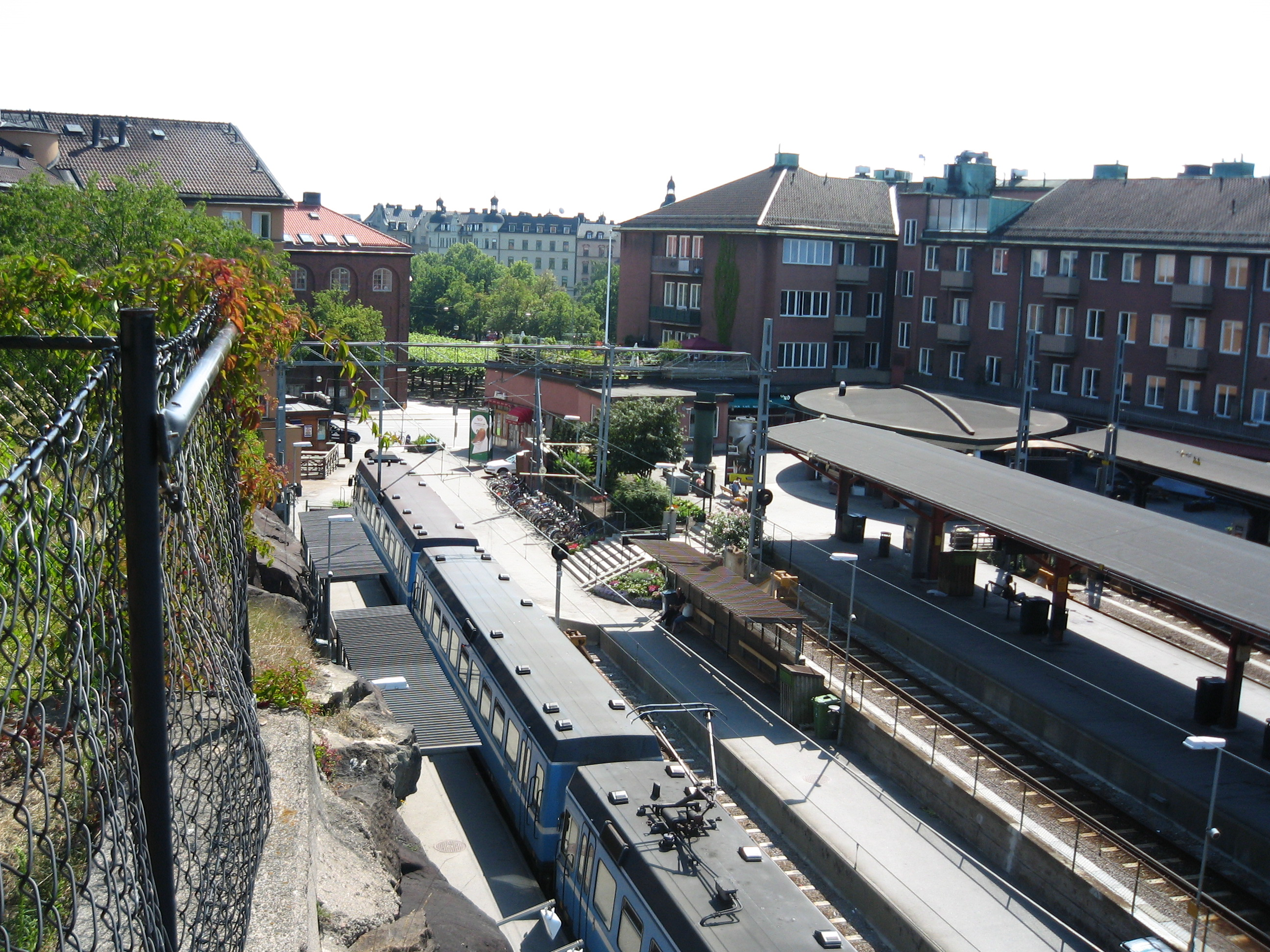
As seen from Nymble, the Students' Union building of the Royal Institute of Technology

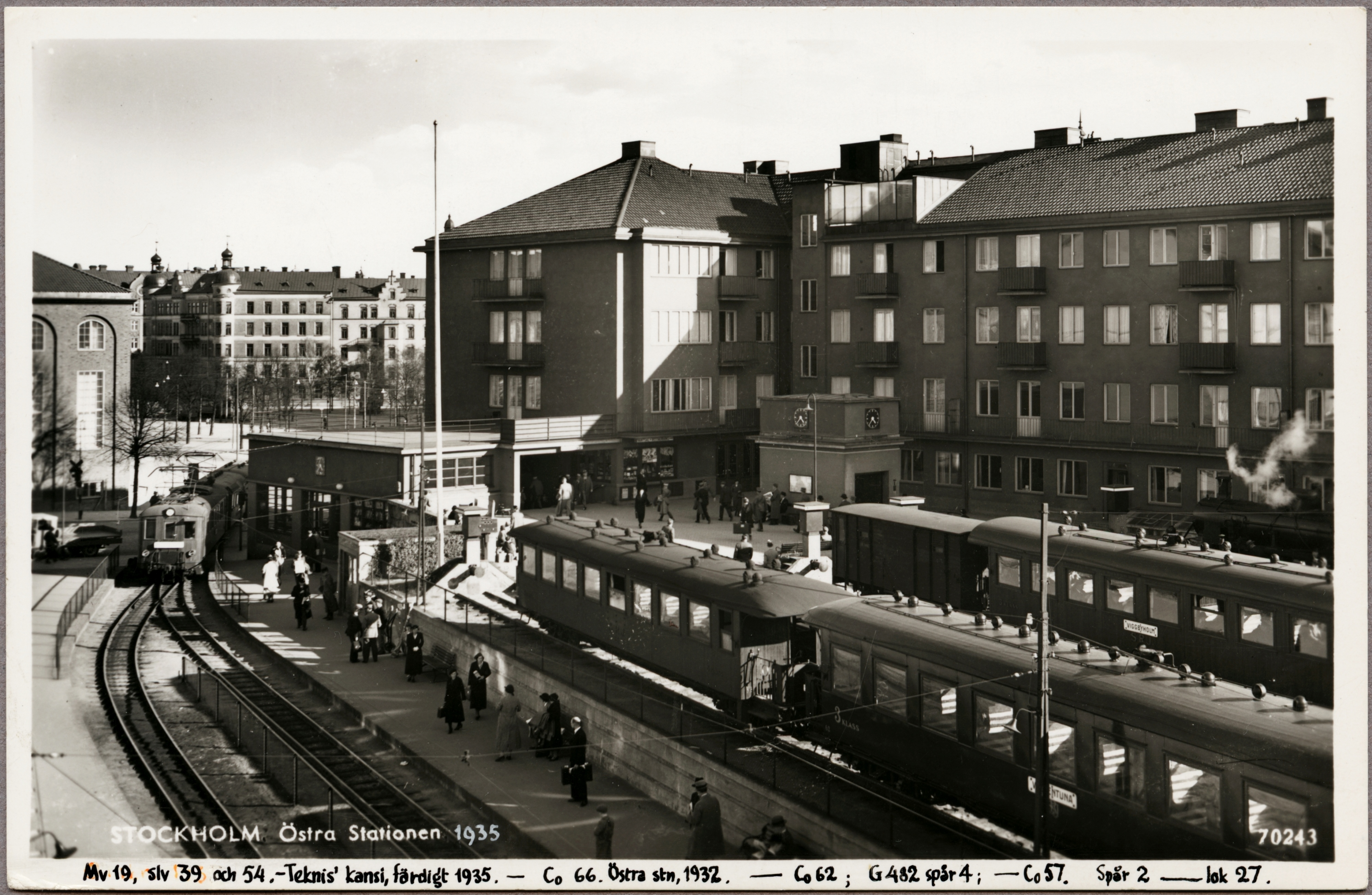
The station in 1935. To the left a train can be seen on the track to Engelbrektsplan which existed at the time
