= Royal Swedish Academy of Agriculture and Forestry =

Coordinates: 59°20′25″N 18°03′16″E

- Kungliga Skogs- och Lantbruksakademien
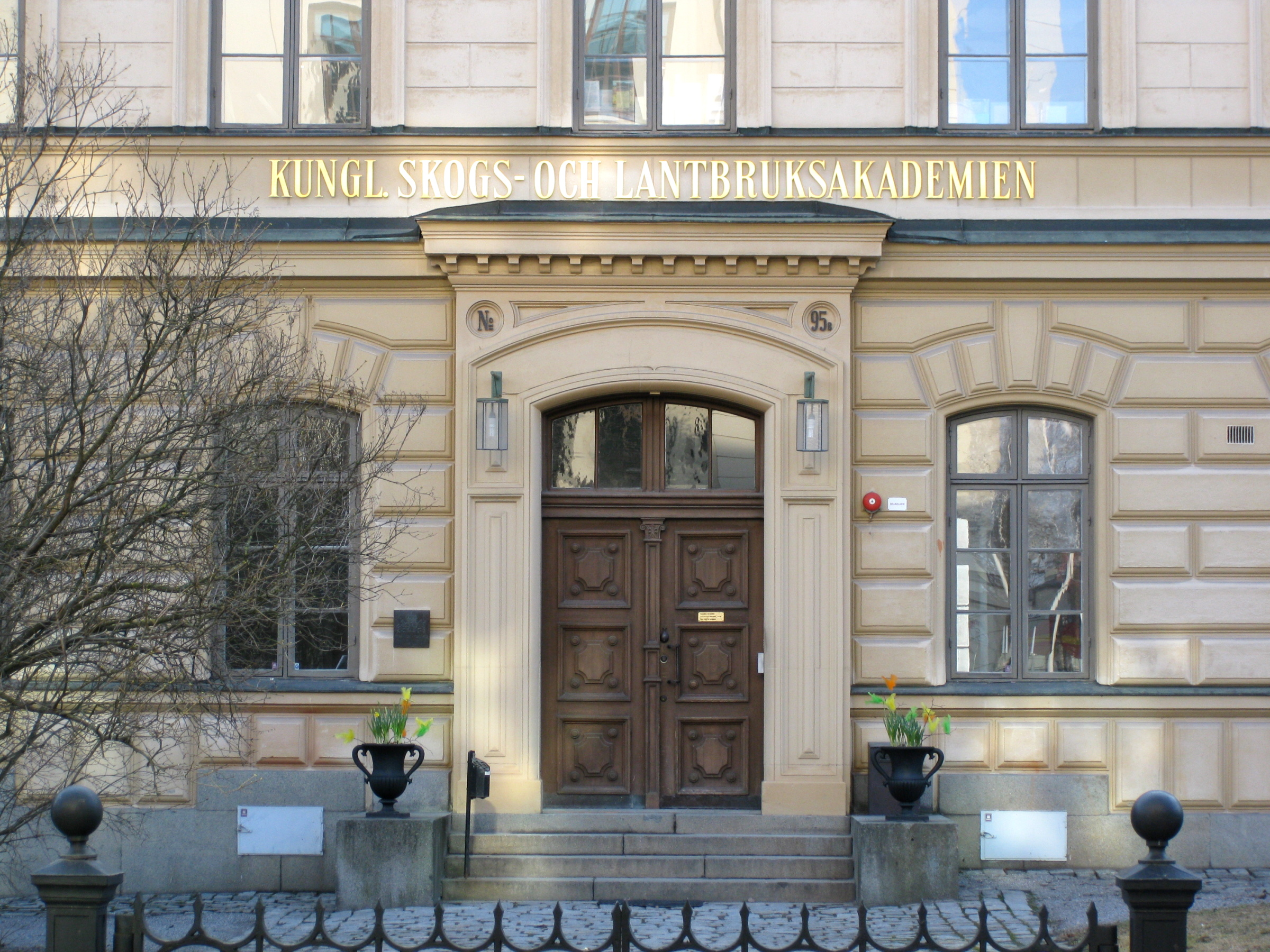

Swedish Royal Academy overview
- Formed: December 28, 1811; 213 years ago

The Royal Swedish Academy of Agriculture and Forestry (Swedish: Kungliga Skogs- och Lantbruksakademien), formerly the Royal Swedish Academy of Agriculture (Swedish: Kungl. Lantbruksakademien), founded in 1813 at the initiative of Crown Prince Charles, is one of the Royal Academies in Sweden. Initially the academy had a function of being auxiliary to the central administrative authorities. The academy now acts an independent organization, promoting agriculture, forestry and related fields with the support of science and practical experience, in the interest of Swedish society.

== See also ==
- Experimentalfältet
- Category:Members of the Royal Swedish Academy of Agriculture and Forestry
