= Mörby centrum metro station =

Stockholm Metro station

Mörby centrum
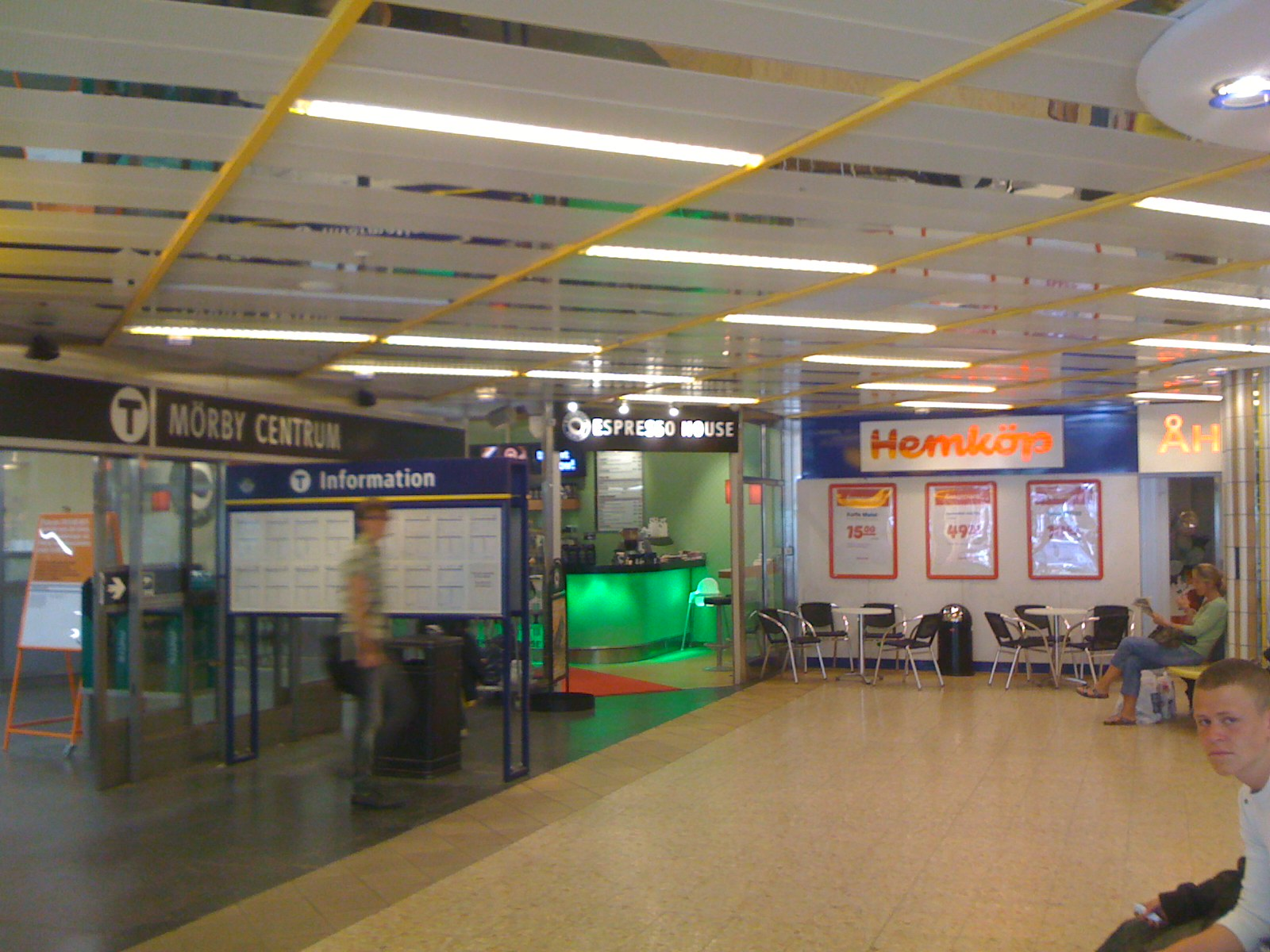

General information
- Coordinates: 59°23′55″N 18°02′10″E
- Elevation: 6.6 m (22 ft) above sea level
- System: Stockholm Metro station
- Owner: Storstockholms Lokaltrafik
- Platforms: 1
- Tracks: 2

Construction
- Structure type: Underground
- Depth: 20–22 m (66–72 ft)
- Accessible: Yes

Other information
- Station code: MÖR

History
- Opened: 29 January 1978; 48 years ago

Passengers
- 2019: 8,350 boarding per weekday

Services
Preceding station	Stockholm Metro	Following station
Danderyds sjukhus towards Fruängen	Line 14	Terminus
Location
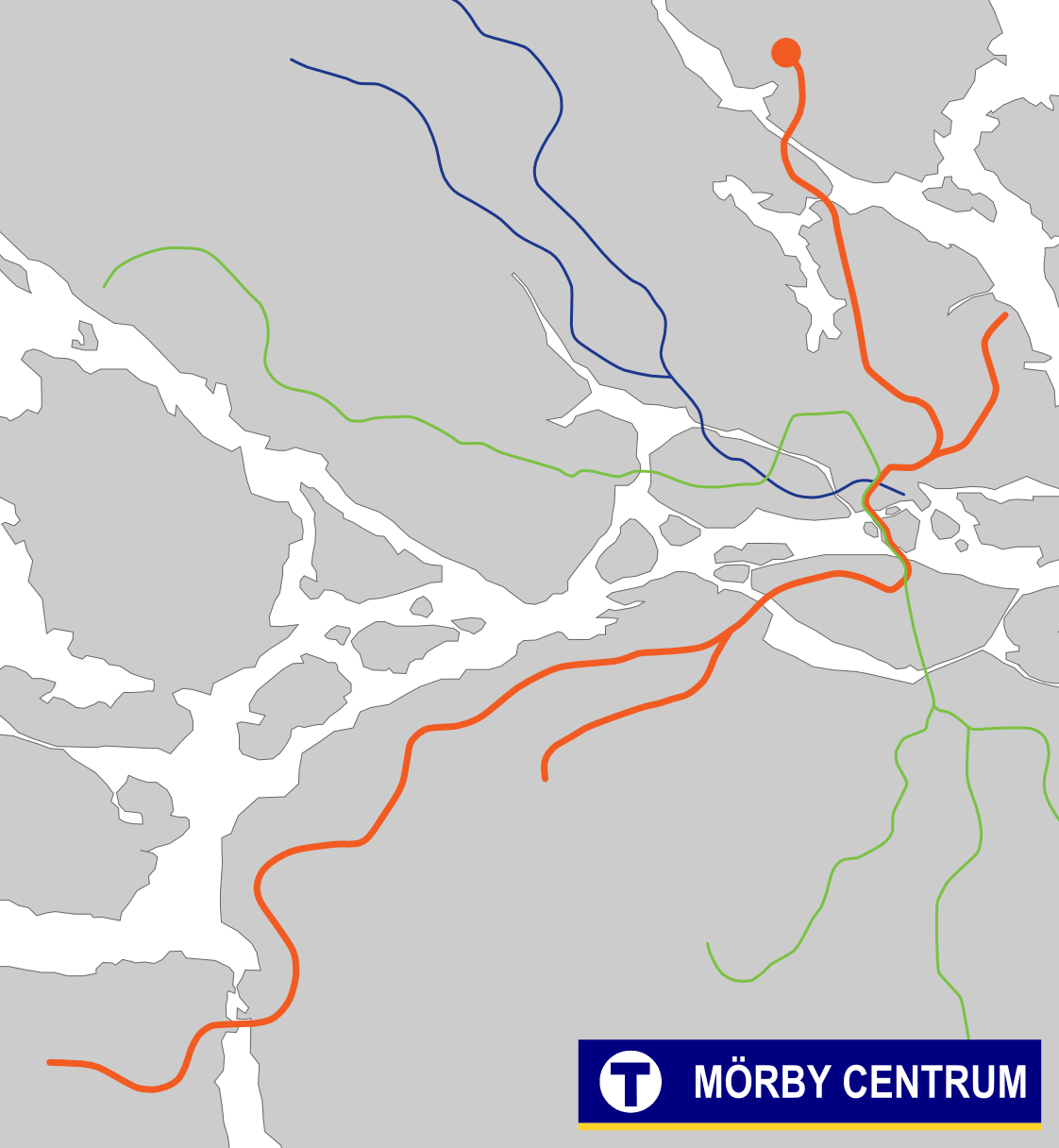

Mörby centrum is the end station on Line 14 of the Red Line of the Stockholm Metro, located near the Mörby centrum shopping mall in Danderyd Municipality. The station was inaugurated on 29 January 1978 as the northern terminus of the extension from Universitetet. It was decorated by the artist Karin Ek.
