= Universitetet railway station =

Railway station in Stockholm, Sweden

Universitetet
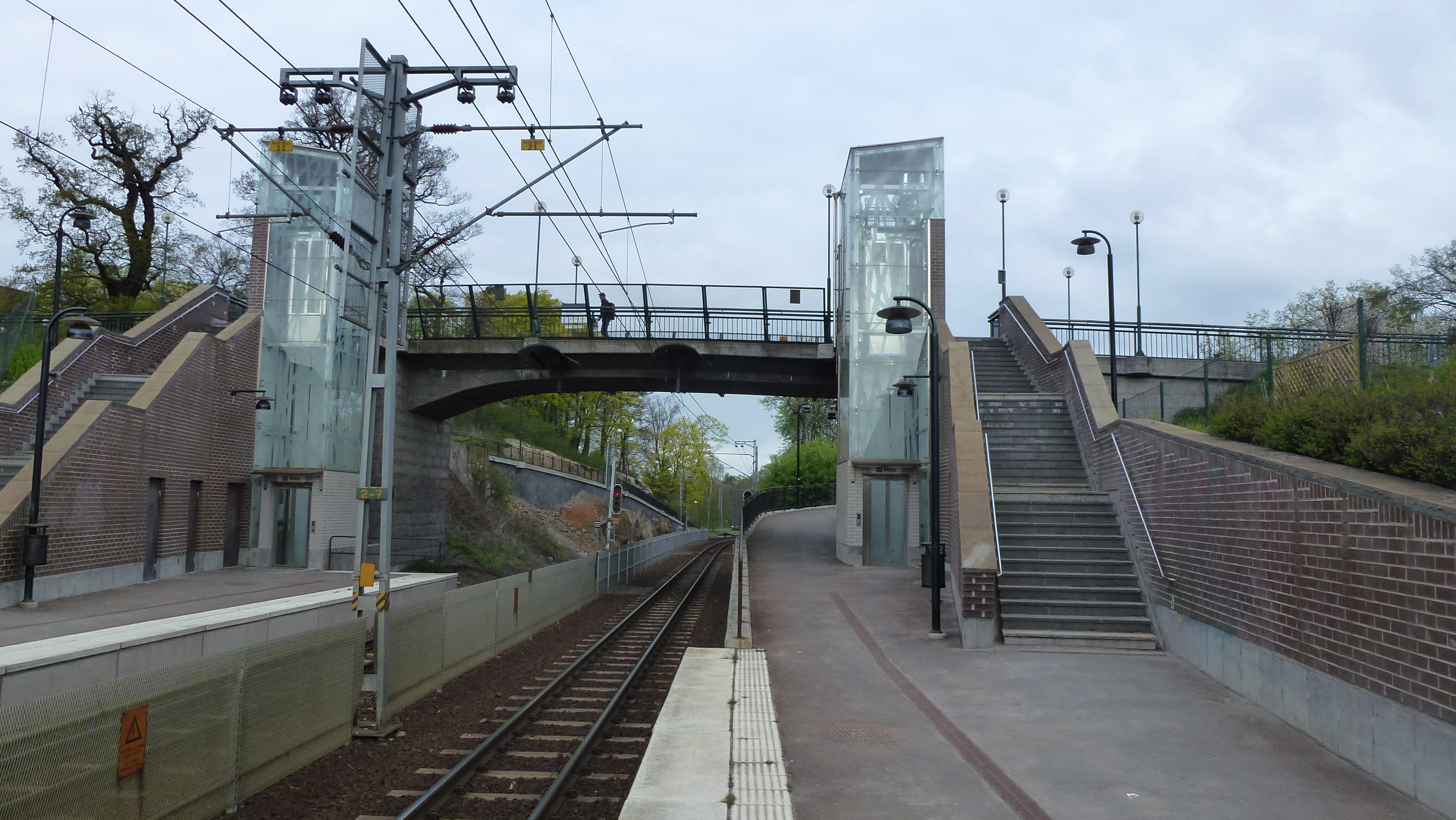

General information
- Location: Stockholm Municipality; Sweden
- Coordinates: 59°21′54″N 18°03′04″E
- Line: Roslagsbanan
- Platforms: Side
- Tracks: 2
- Connections: Metro: at Universitetet metro station Bus: 50, 540, 608, 624C, 628C, 639, 670, 676, 680

Construction
- Structure type: At grade
- Accessible: Yes

History
- Opened: 7 January 2010

Passengers
- 2019: 1,100 boarding per weekday (Roslagsbanan)

Services
Preceding station	SL Local & Light Rail	Following station
Stockholms östra Terminus	Roslagsbanan Line 27	Mörby towards Kårsta
Stockholms östra Terminus	Roslagsbanan Line 28	Mörby towards Österskär
Stockholms östra Terminus	Roslagsbanan Line 29	Stocksund towards Näsbypark
Location

Universitetet (Swedish: "the university") is a railway station in Stockholm along the Roslagsbanan, named for nearby Stockholm University. The present station was inaugurated on 7 January 2010, replacing the older station by the same name which had been closed for service since 14 June 2009. The closest station to the north, Frescati, was also closed at this time, and will not open again.

The former station Universitetet was originally called Experimentalfältet, but was renamed in the 1960s when the university campus was moved to its present site.

Not far from the station is the Universitetet metro station and several bus lines.

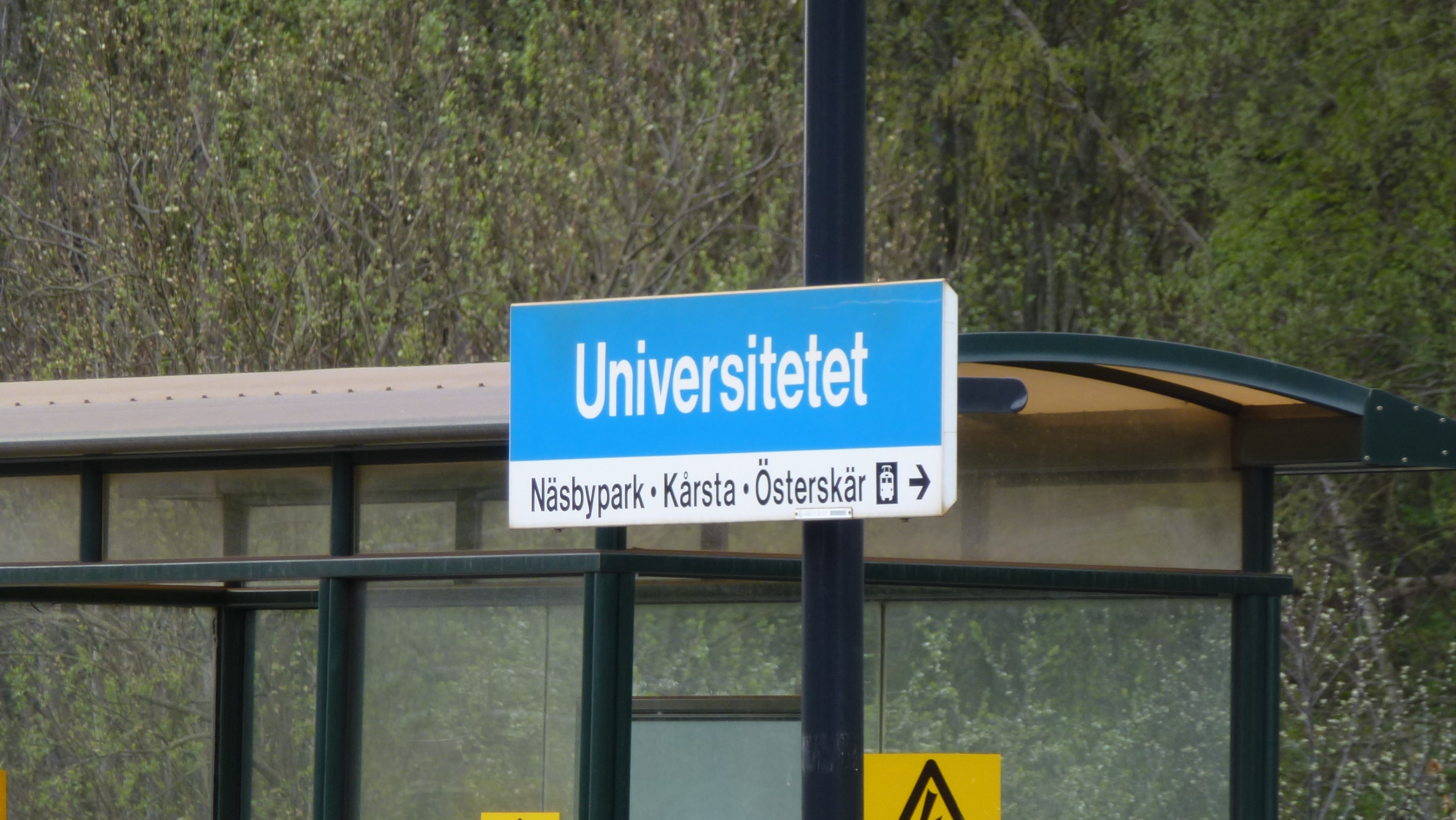
