= Universitetet metro station =

Stockholm Metro station

Universitetet
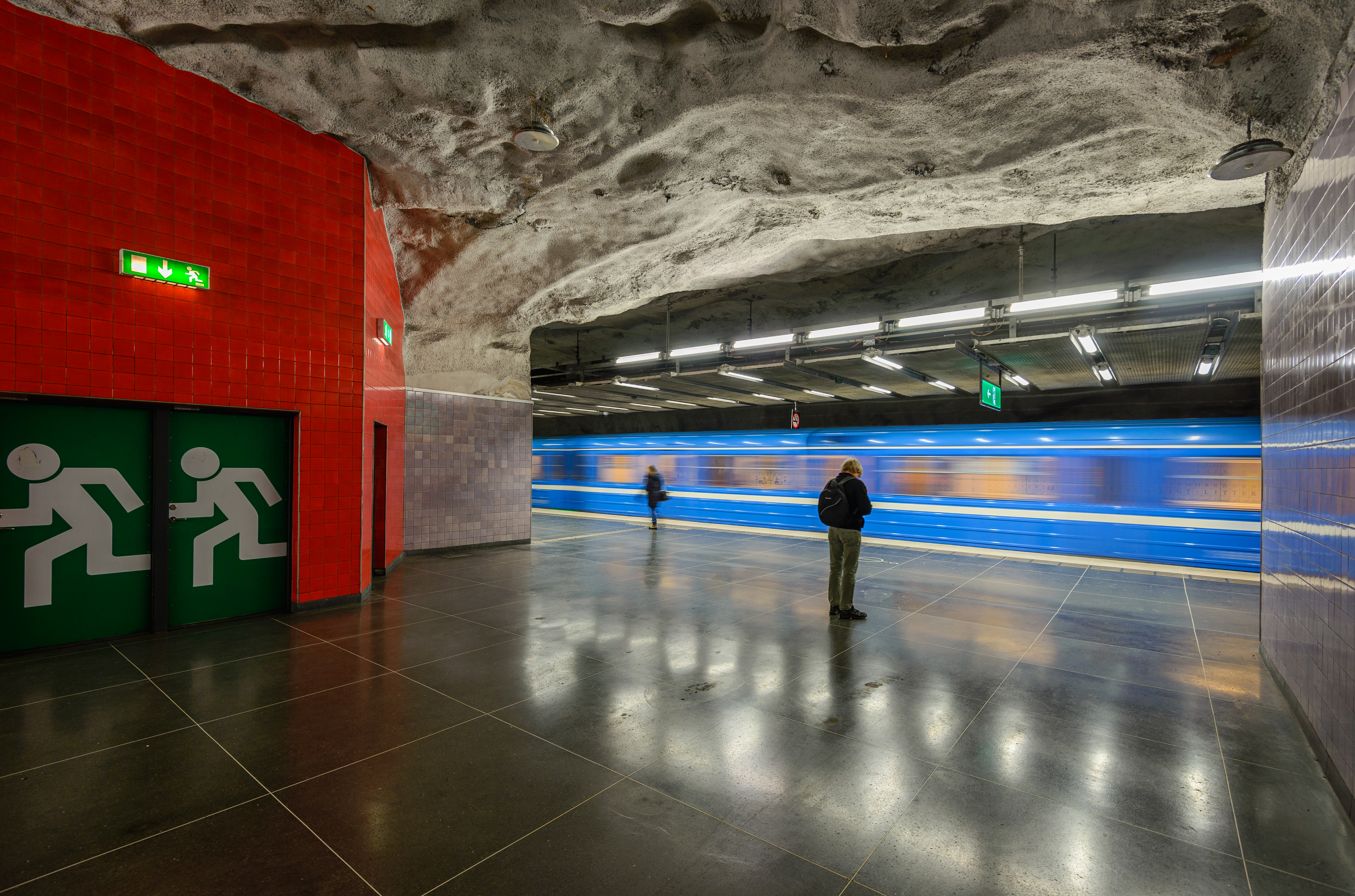

General information
- Coordinates: 59°21′54″N 18°3′16″E
- Elevation: 9.5 m (31 ft) below sea level
- System: Stockholm Metro station
- Owner: Storstockholms Lokaltrafik
- Platforms: 1 island platform
- Tracks: 2

Construction
- Structure type: Underground
- Depth: 25 m (82 ft) below ground
- Accessible: Yes

Other information
- Station code: UNT

History
- Opened: 12 January 1975; 51 years ago

Passengers
- 2019: 13,700 boarding per weekday

Services
Preceding station	Stockholm Metro	Following station
Tekniska högskolan towards Fruängen	Line 14	Bergshamra towards Mörby centrum
Location
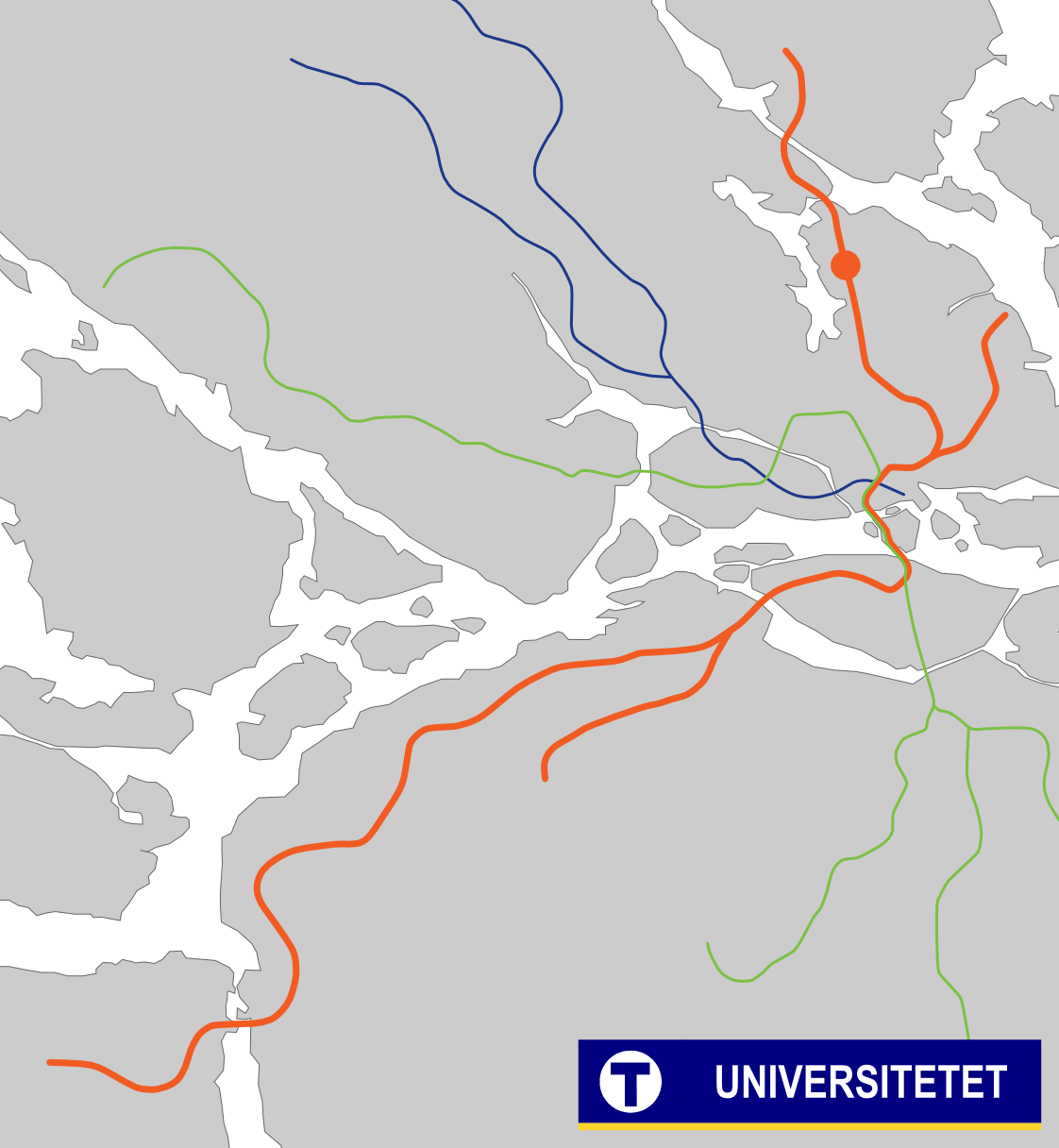

Universitetet is a station on Line 14 of the Red Line of the Stockholm Metro. It is located in the Frescati area, close to Stockholm University and the Museum of Natural History. It was opened on 12 January 1975 as the northern terminus of the extension from Tekniska högskolan. On 29 January 1978, the line was extended north to Mörby centrum.

Since the 1990s, the art on the station consists of tiles featuring Carl von Linné and the UN Declaration of Universal Human Rights, created by Belgian and Parisian artist Françoise Schein. The station includes 12 large tiles panels all dedicated to the travels of Linné around the Baltic. The artist used the travels as the starting point to develop the theme of nature and present-day ecological problems. The work was created in Lisbon on azulejos, then brought to Stockholm.

Not far from the station is the Universitetet railway station and several bus lines.
