= Ragnar Östberg =

Swedish architect

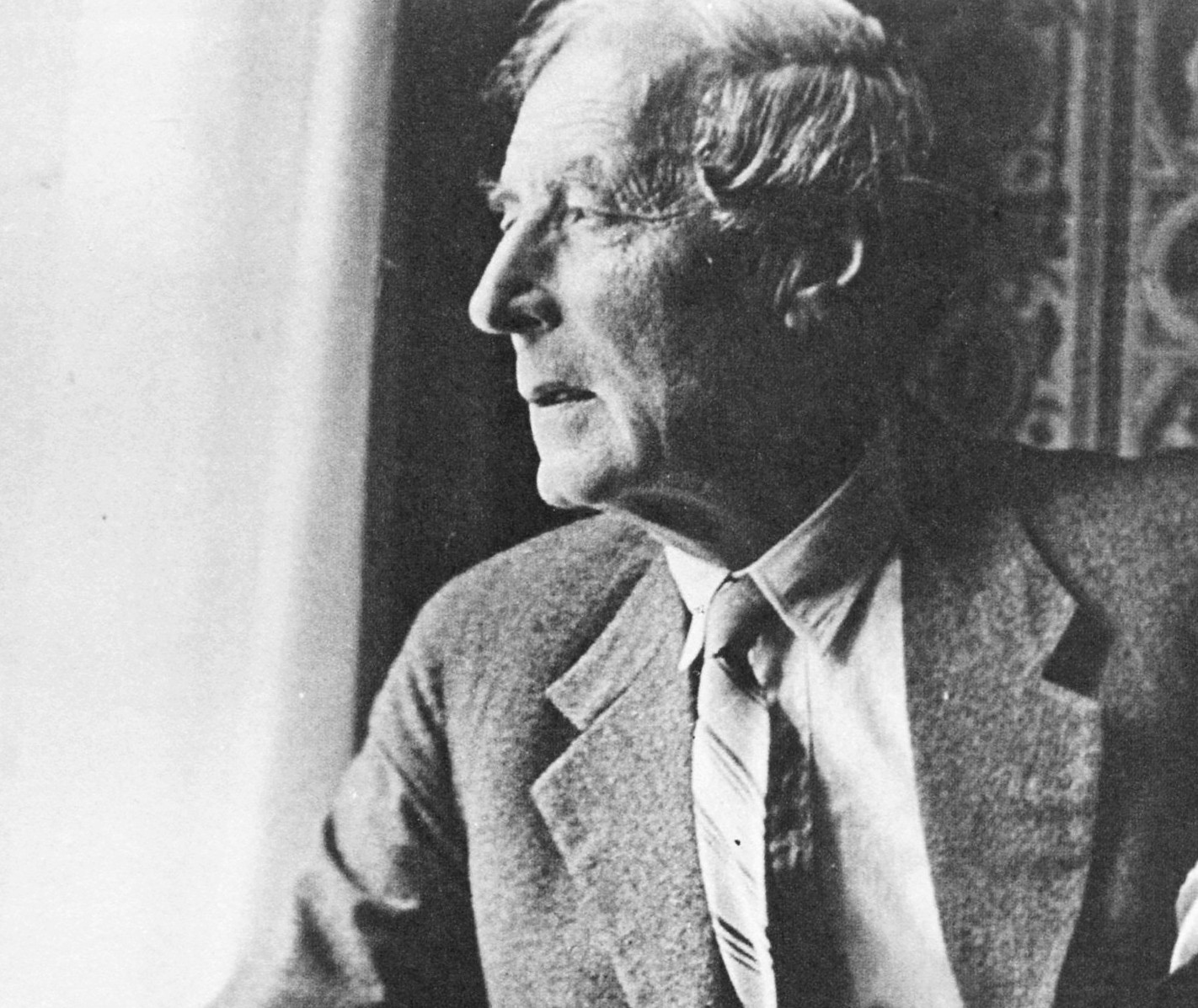
- Ragnar Östberg (1934)
- Born: 14 July 1866; Stockholm, Sweden
- Died: 5 February 1945 (aged 78); Stockholm, Sweden
- Occupation: Architect
- Spouse: Carin Thiel
- Children: Susanna Ramel
- Awards: Royal Gold Medal; AIA Gold Medal; Honorary member of the Royal Academy; Member of the Stockholm Beauty Council
- Buildings: Stockholm City Hall

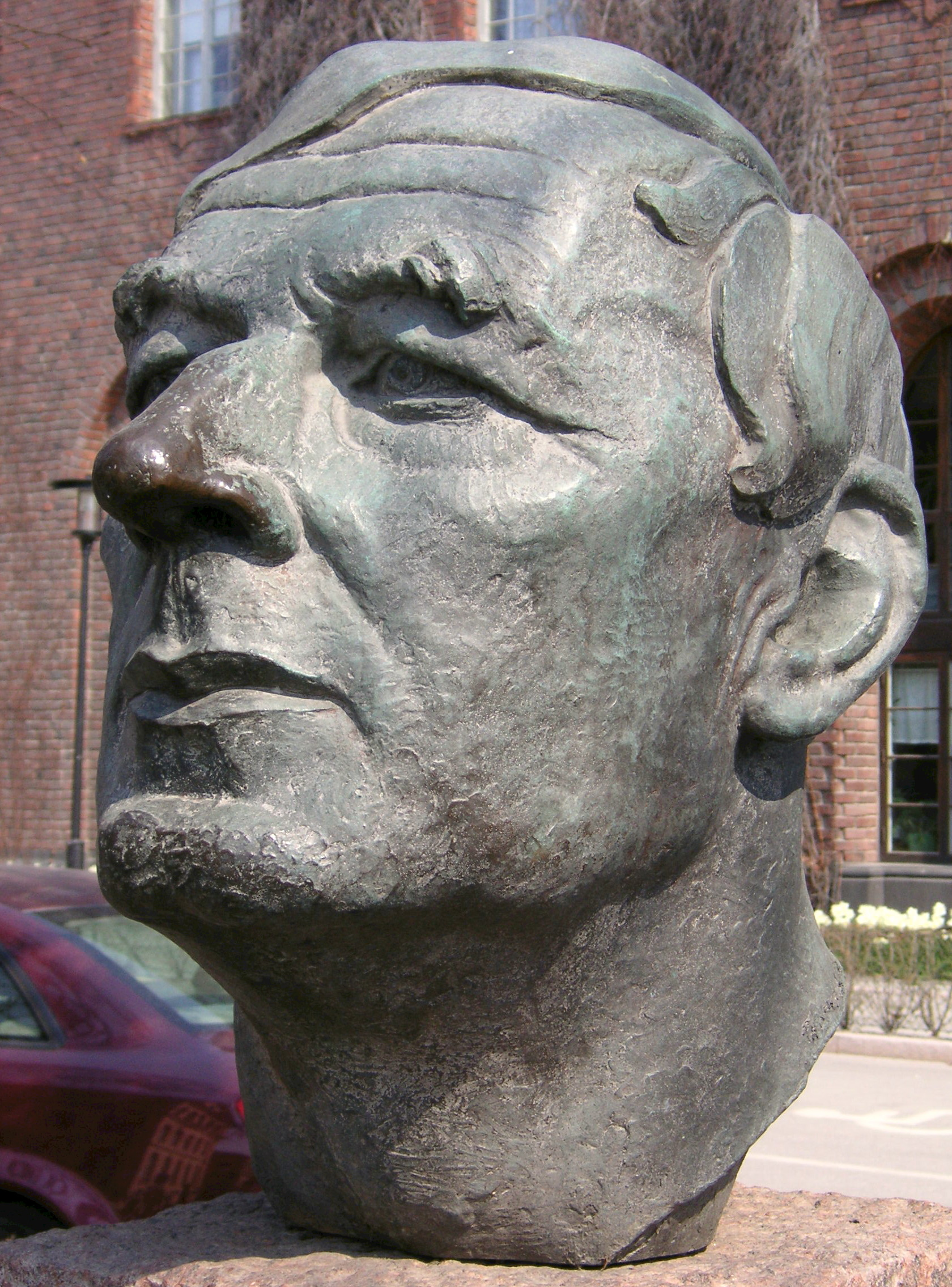
Ragnar Östberg bust by Thorwald Alef in Stockholm (1974)

Ragnar Östberg (14 July 1866 – 5 February 1945) was a Swedish architect who is best known for designing Stockholm City Hall.

== Biography ==
Östberg was born in Stockholm, Sweden. His parents were Carl Östberg and Erika Kindahl. Between 1884 and 1891, he first studied at KTH Royal Institute of Technology. In 1888, he studied at the Royal Swedish Academy of Fine Arts. He had an internship with architect Isak Gustaf Clason (1856–1930). In 1893 he visited the World's Columbian Exposition in Chicago and in 1896 he went on a three-year study trip to, among others, England, France, Italy and Greece. Dating from the early 1900s, he lived and worked in Umeå in northern Sweden. Scharinska villan in Umeå is considered one of Östberg's best works during his youth.

Östberg became the most famous architect within the so-called "national romanticist" movement in Sweden. His body of work from the period ranges from public buildings, such as Stockholm City Hall, to mansions for influential families at the turn of the century, such as Scharinska villan or Nedre Manilla, built for members of the Bonnier family.

== Buildings ==
- Nedre Manilla, Djurgården, Stockholm
- Villa Ekarne (1905), Djurgården, Stockholm
- Villa Pauli, Djursholm (1905)
- Scharinska villan, Umeå (1905)
- Aschanska villan, Umeå (1906)
- Teaterhuset, Umeå (1906–1907)
- Prinsvillan, Djursholm, Danderyd (1909)
- Östermalms läroverk, "Östra Real", Stockholm (1906–1910)
- Patent- och registeringsverket, Stockholm (1911–1921)
- Stockholm City Hall (1923)
- Krematorium, Helsingborg (1929)
- Riksbron (bridge), Stockholm (1926–1930)
- The rebuilt palace on the islet of Strömsborg (1929–1930)
- Värmlands nation in Uppsala (1930)
- The Stagnelius School, Kalmar (1931–32)
- The Museum of Maritime History in Stockholm (1933–1936)
- The Zorn Museum in Mora (1938–1939)

== Gallery ==
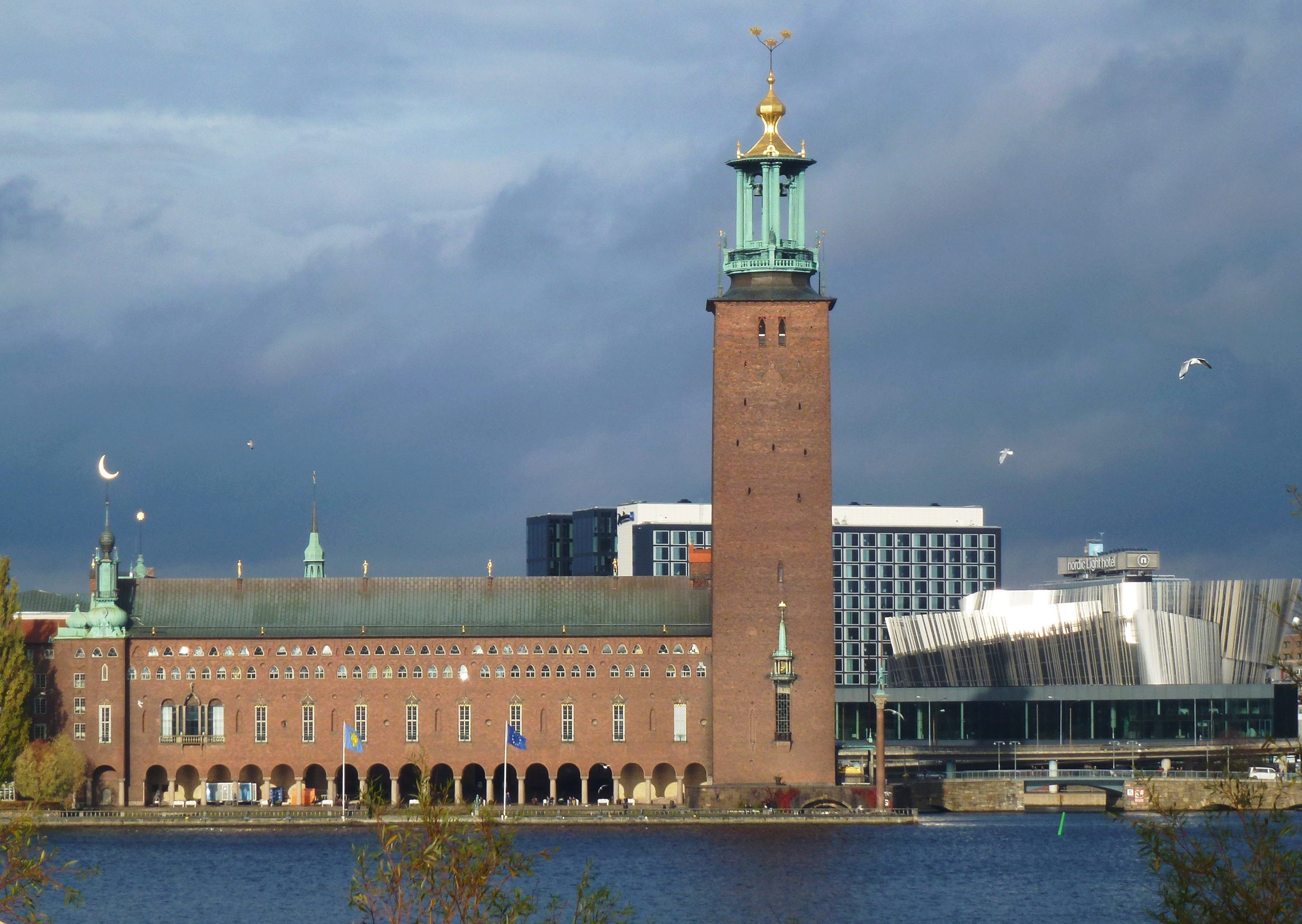
Stockholm City Hall, view over Lake Mälaren, 2013

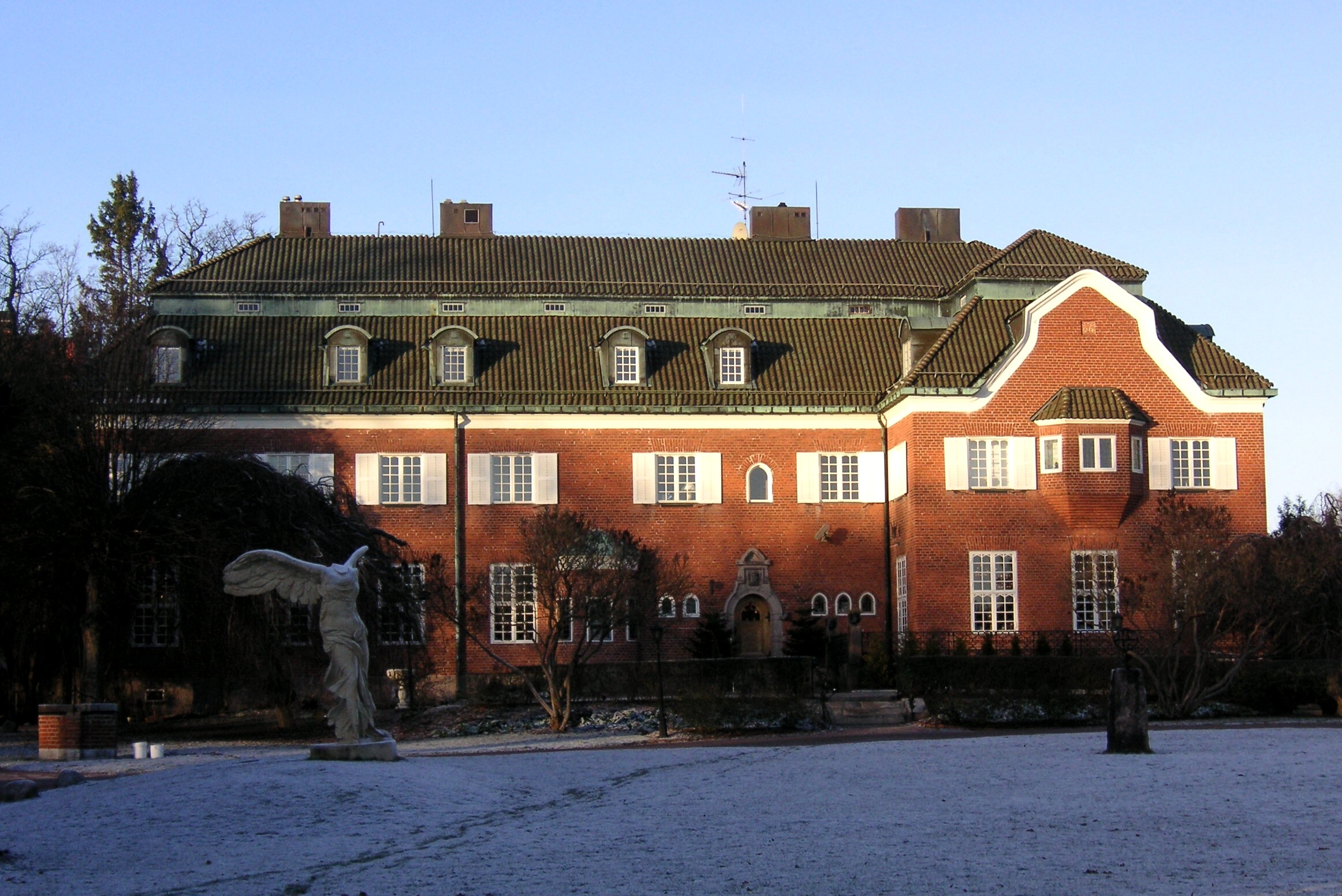
Villa Pauli, Djursholm, seen from Strandvägen, winter 2007

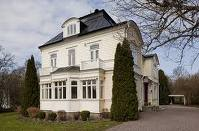
Prinsvillan, Djursholm, seen from Germaniavägen, spring 2009

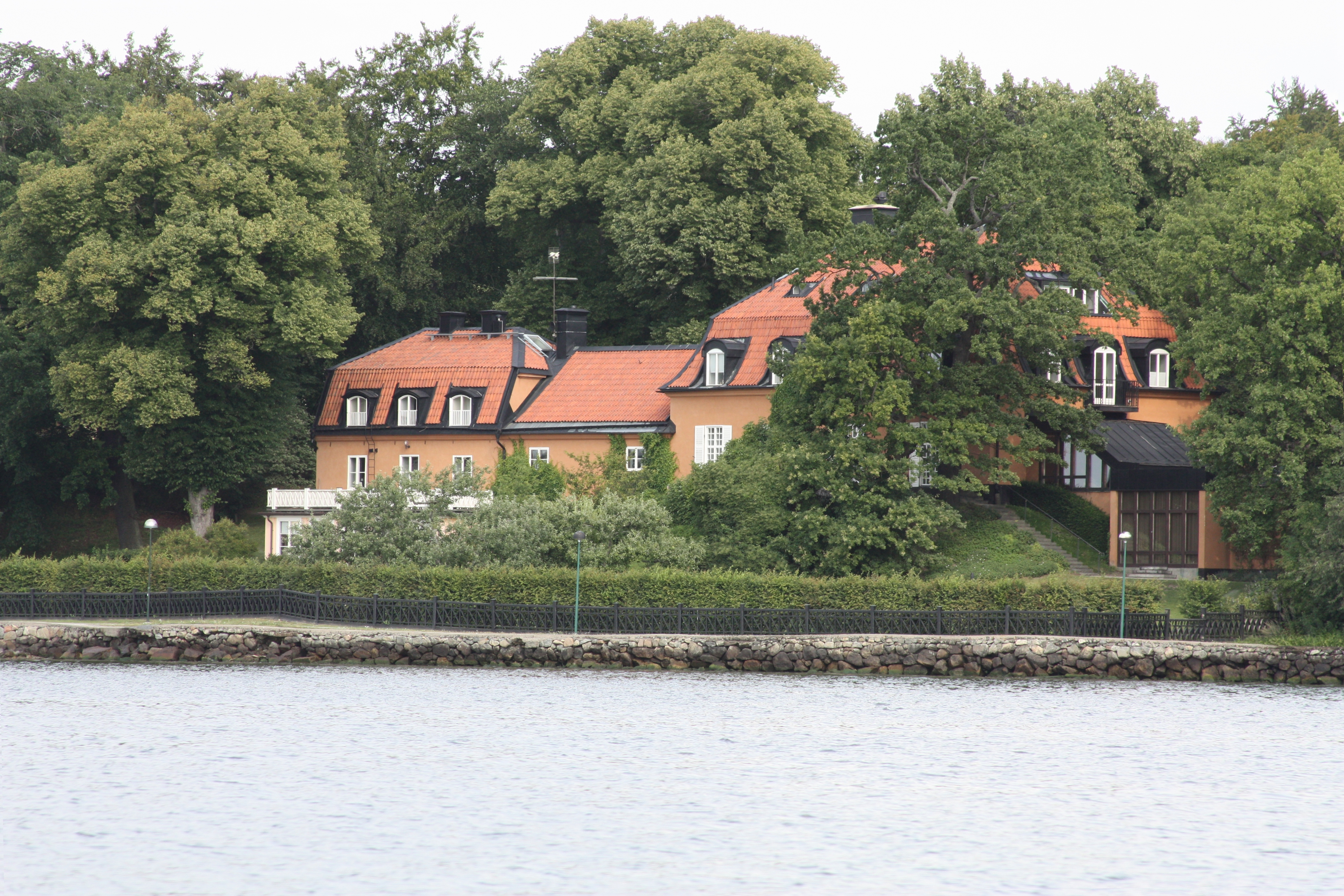
Nedre Manilla, Djurgården, seen from Stockholm harbour, summer 2009

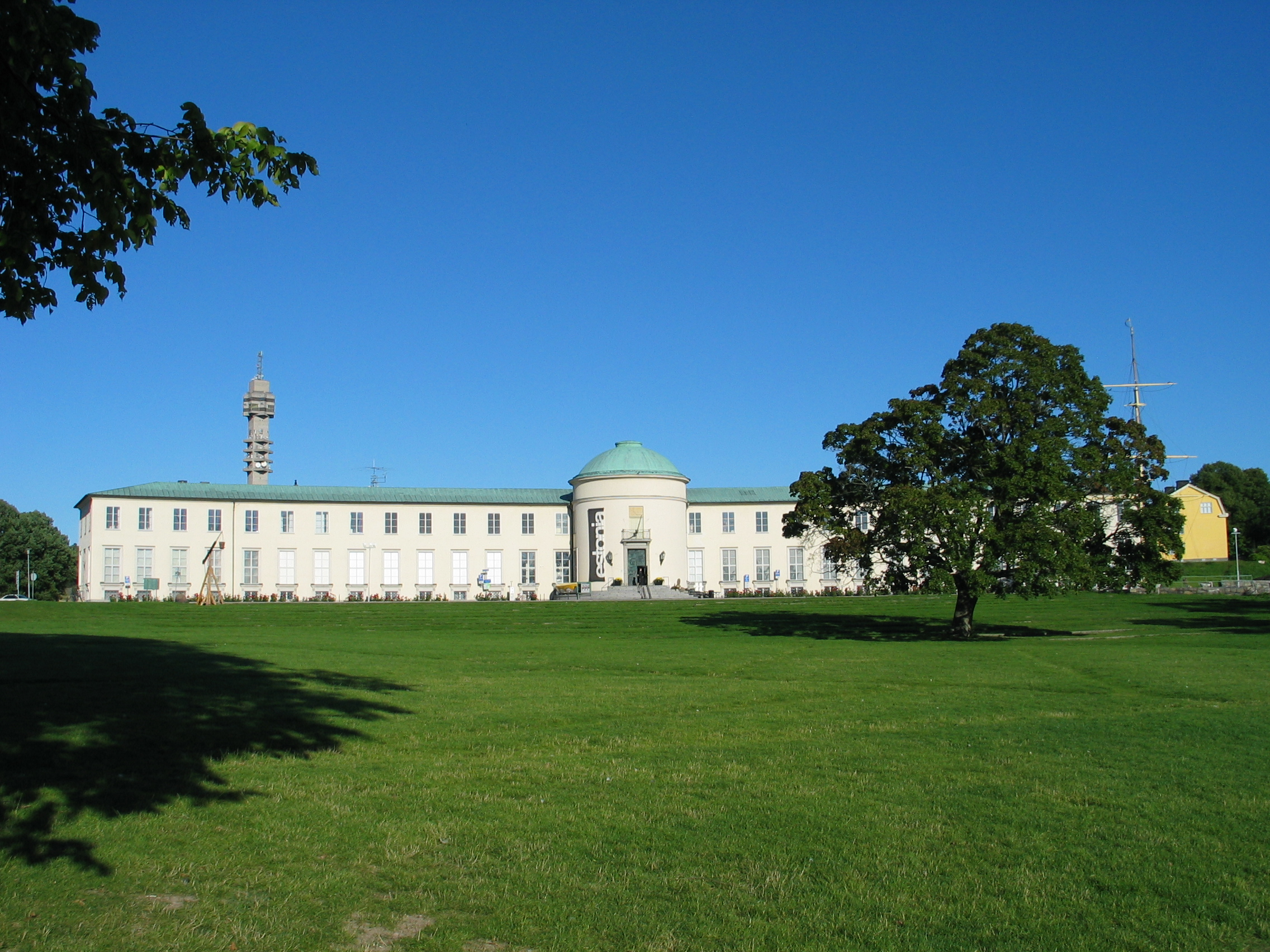
Maritime Museum, Stockholm, seen from Djurgården, summer 2009

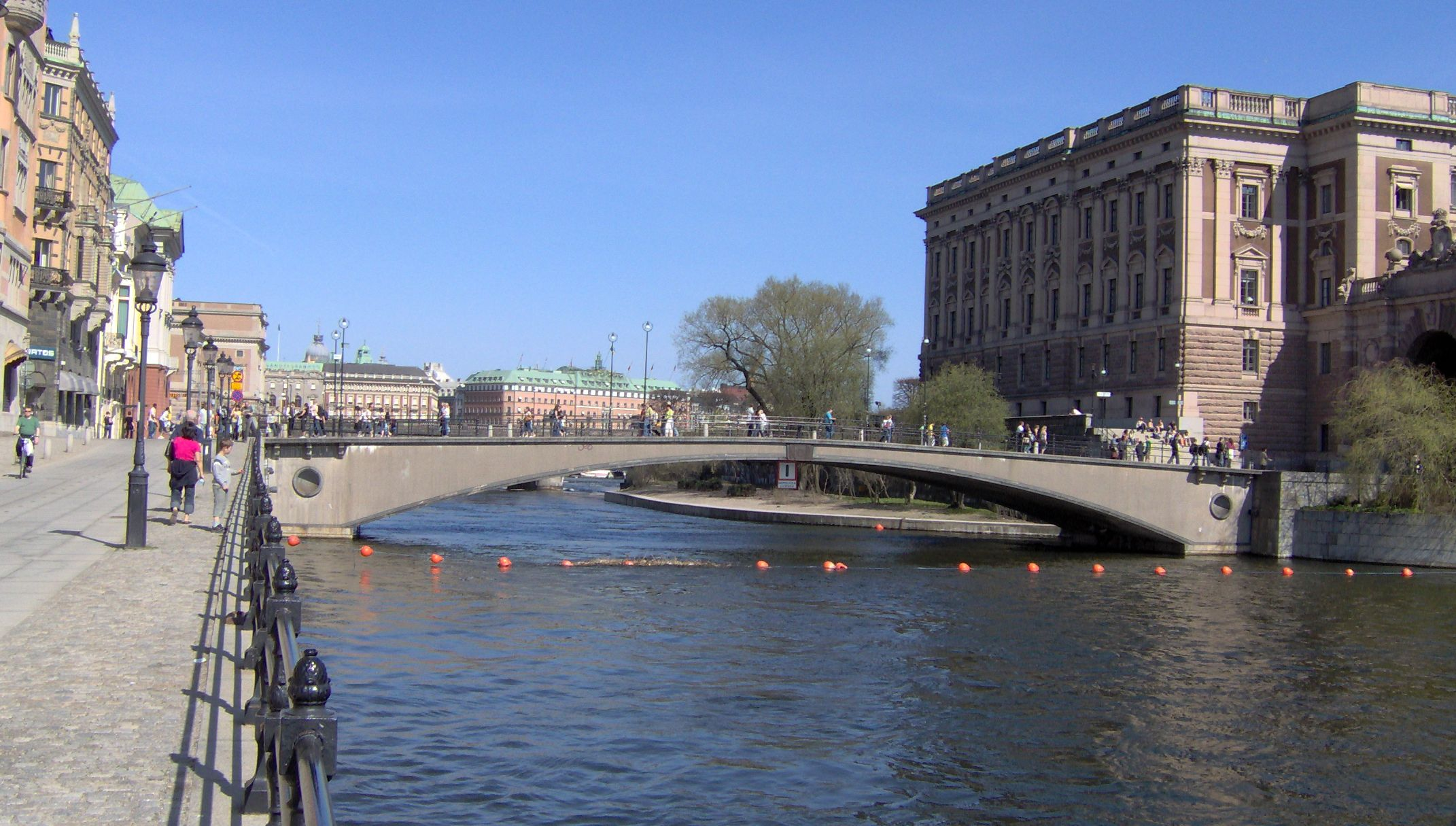
Riksbron, Stockholm, seen from the west, spring 2006

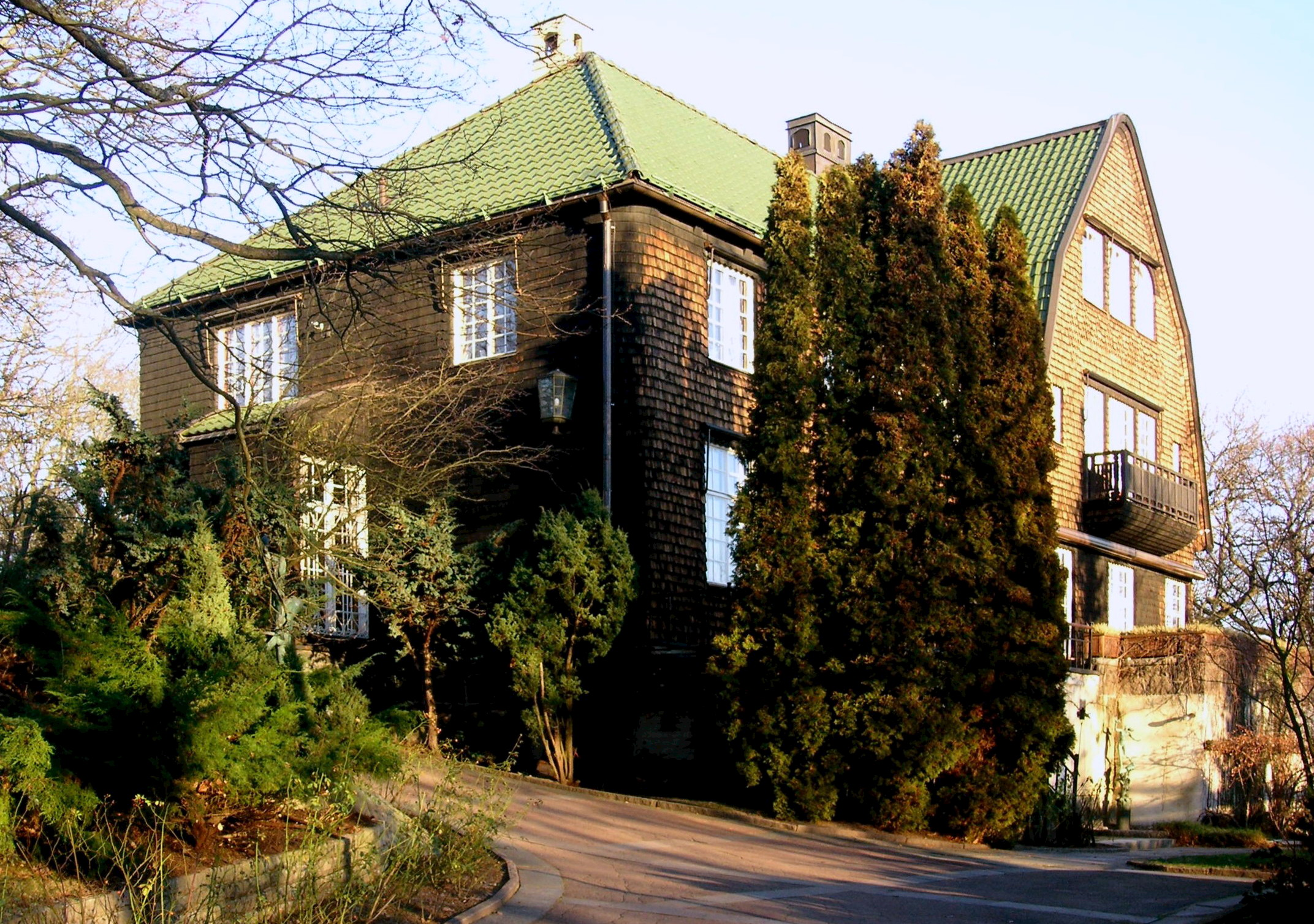
Villa Ekarne, Djurgården, autumn 2007

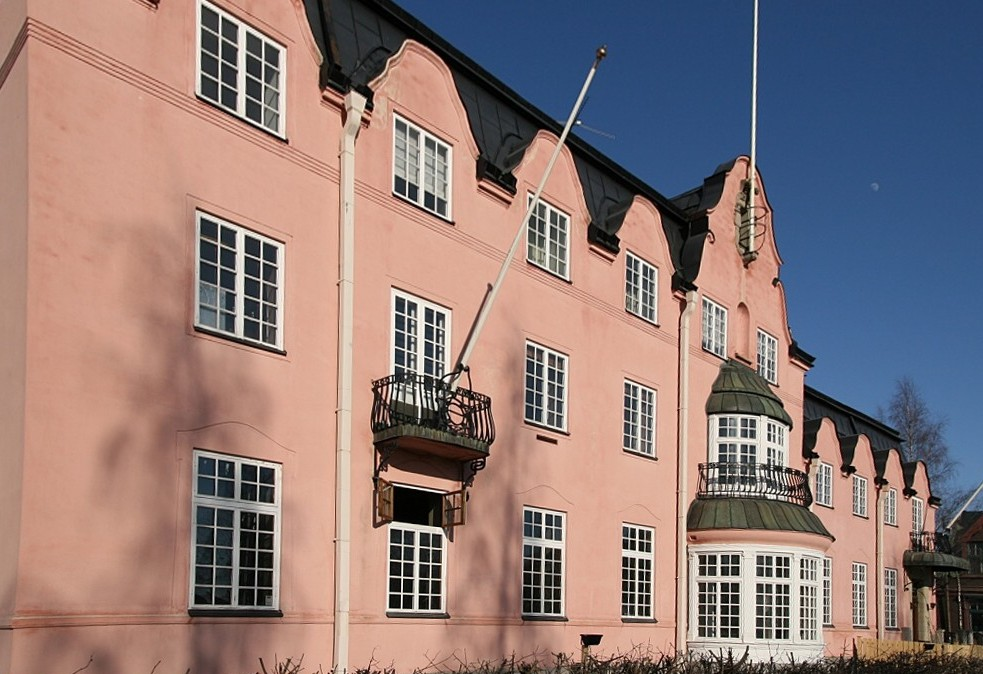
Scharinska Villan, Umeå, spring 2007

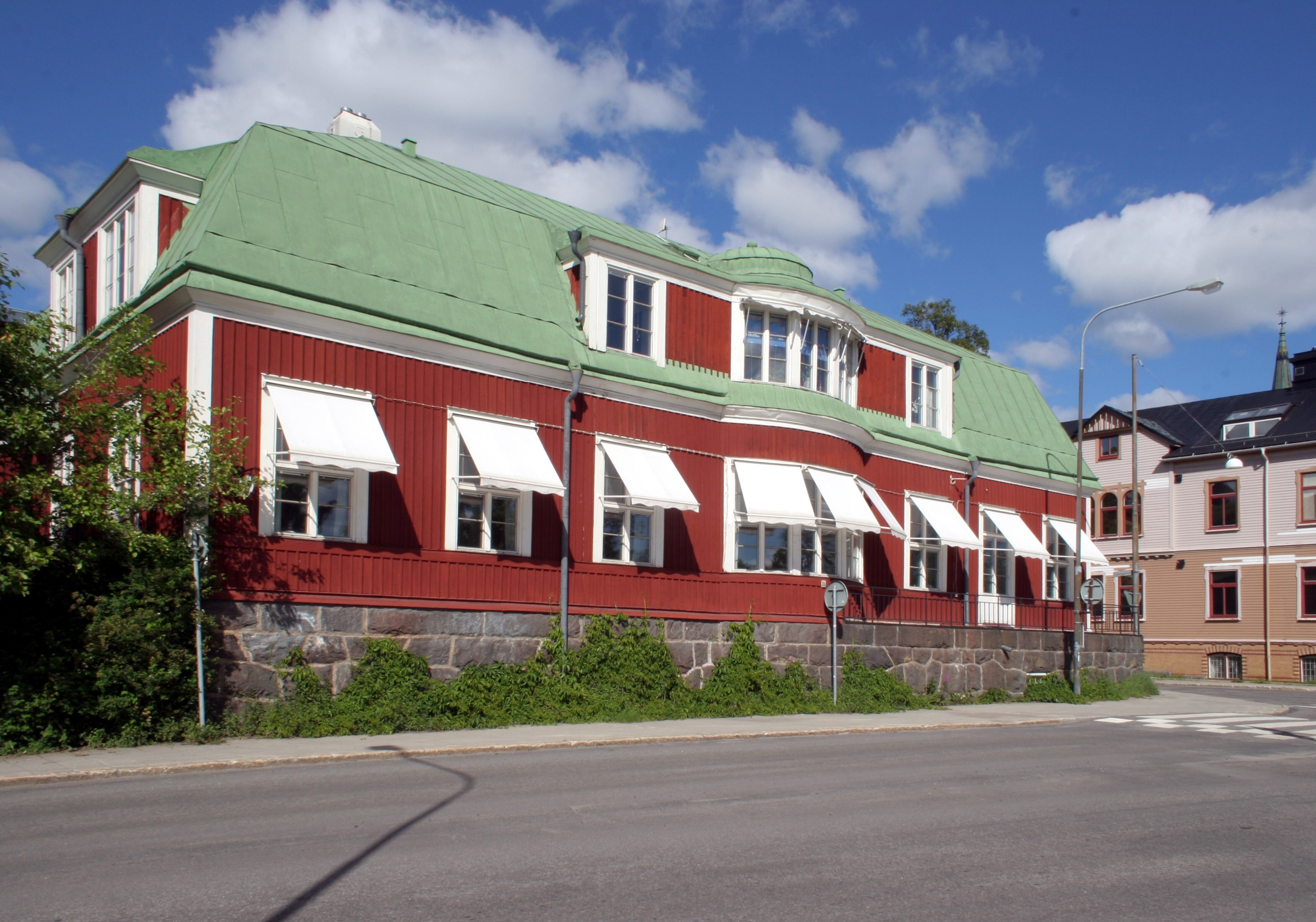
Aschanska Villan, Umeå, summer 2005

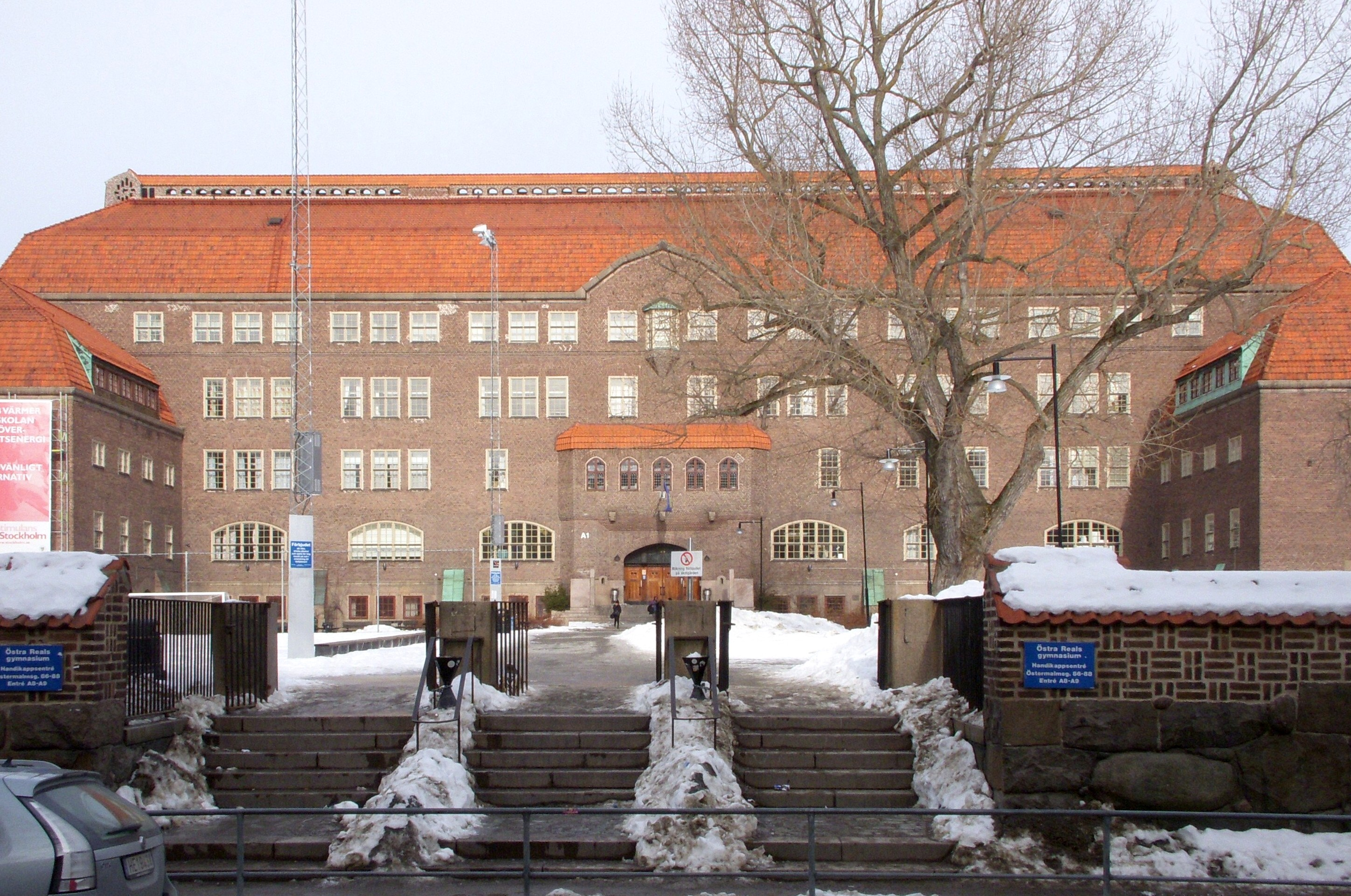
Östermalms läroverk, Stockholm, winter 2011

== Other sources ==
- Cornell, Elias (1966) Ragnar Östberg - en svensk arkitekt
- Söderberg, Rolf (1955) Svenska Män och Kvinnor del 8
- Thelaus, Erik (1983) Ragnar Östbergs byggnader i Umeå
- Monterumisi, Chiara (2017) Ragnar Östberg – Villa Geber, una casa nell’arcipelago. Ediz. Italian, English and Swedish, In Edibus, Vicenza, ISBN 978-8897221517
- Atmer, Ann Katrin Pihl (2011) Stockholms stadshus och arkitekten Ragnar Östberg (Kultur Allmänlitteratur) ISBN 9789127130647
