= Aschanska Villa =

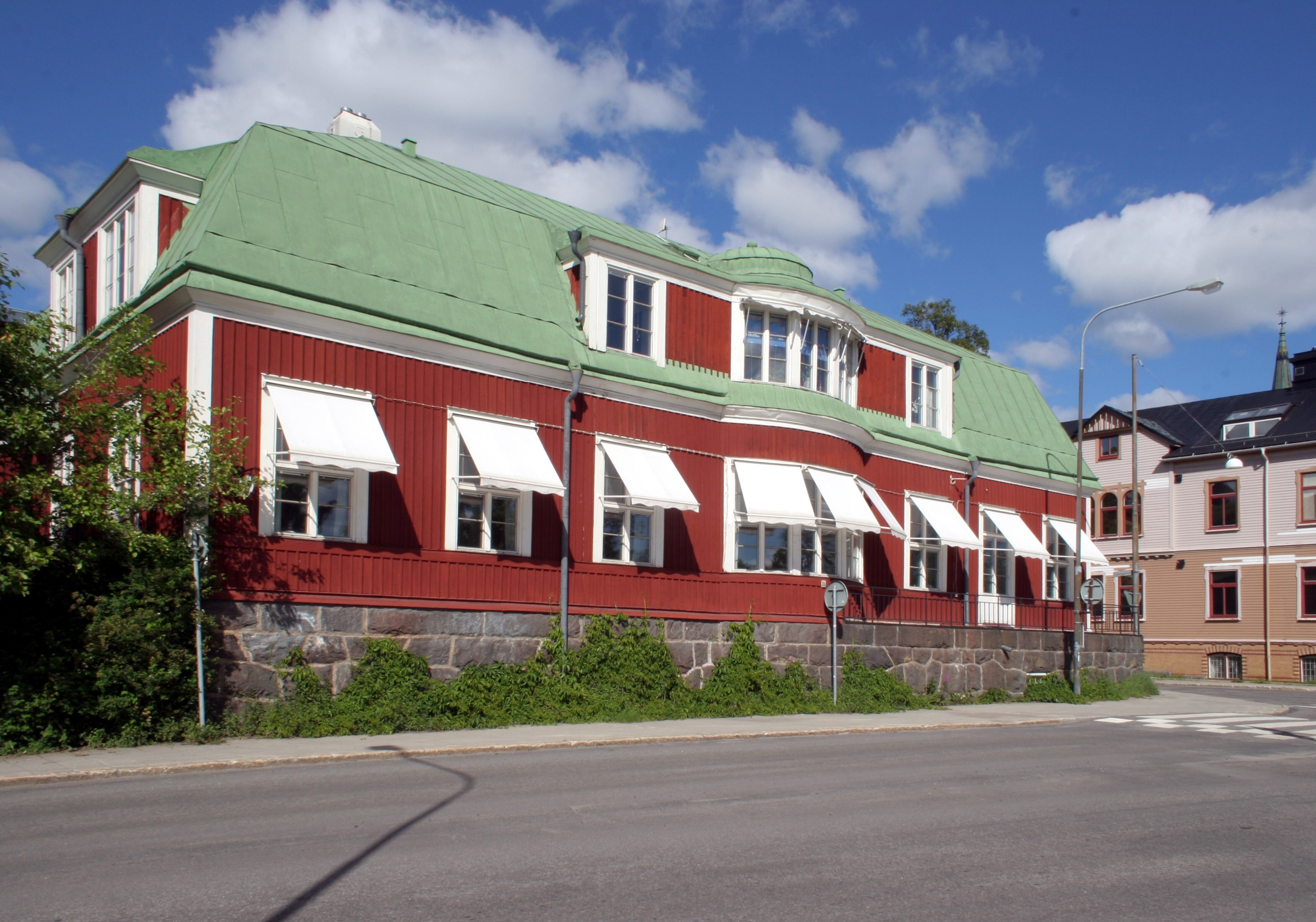
- Aschanska Villa

General information
- Status: Listed buildings in Sweden
- Type: Villa
- Architectural style: Victorian
- Town or city: Umeå
- Country: Sweden
- Coordinates: 63°49′26″N 20°15′51″E
- Completed: 1906

Design and construction
- Architect(s): Ragnar Östberg

Aschanska Villa is a listed building in Umeå in northern Sweden. The villa was designed by the architect Ragnar Östberg and it was completed in 1906 for Colonel Wilhelm Aschan who led the Norrlands dragonregemente. Today the building is a restaurant.

== The building ==
The villa was designed by the architect Ragnar Östberg and it was complete in 1906 for Colonel Wilhelm Aschan who led the local dragoons. Östberg designed a number of buildings in Umeå although he is known for building the Town Hall in Stockholm. Today the villa is used as a restaurant.

The wooden villa is designed in the National Romantic style similar to Scharinska Villa which had been built locally by the same architect the year before. The villa stands on a stone foundation and plinth.

The building has been listed since the 1980s. Östberg created one more building in Umeå and this was a theatre, built of timber and burned to the ground in 1913.
