= Djursholm =

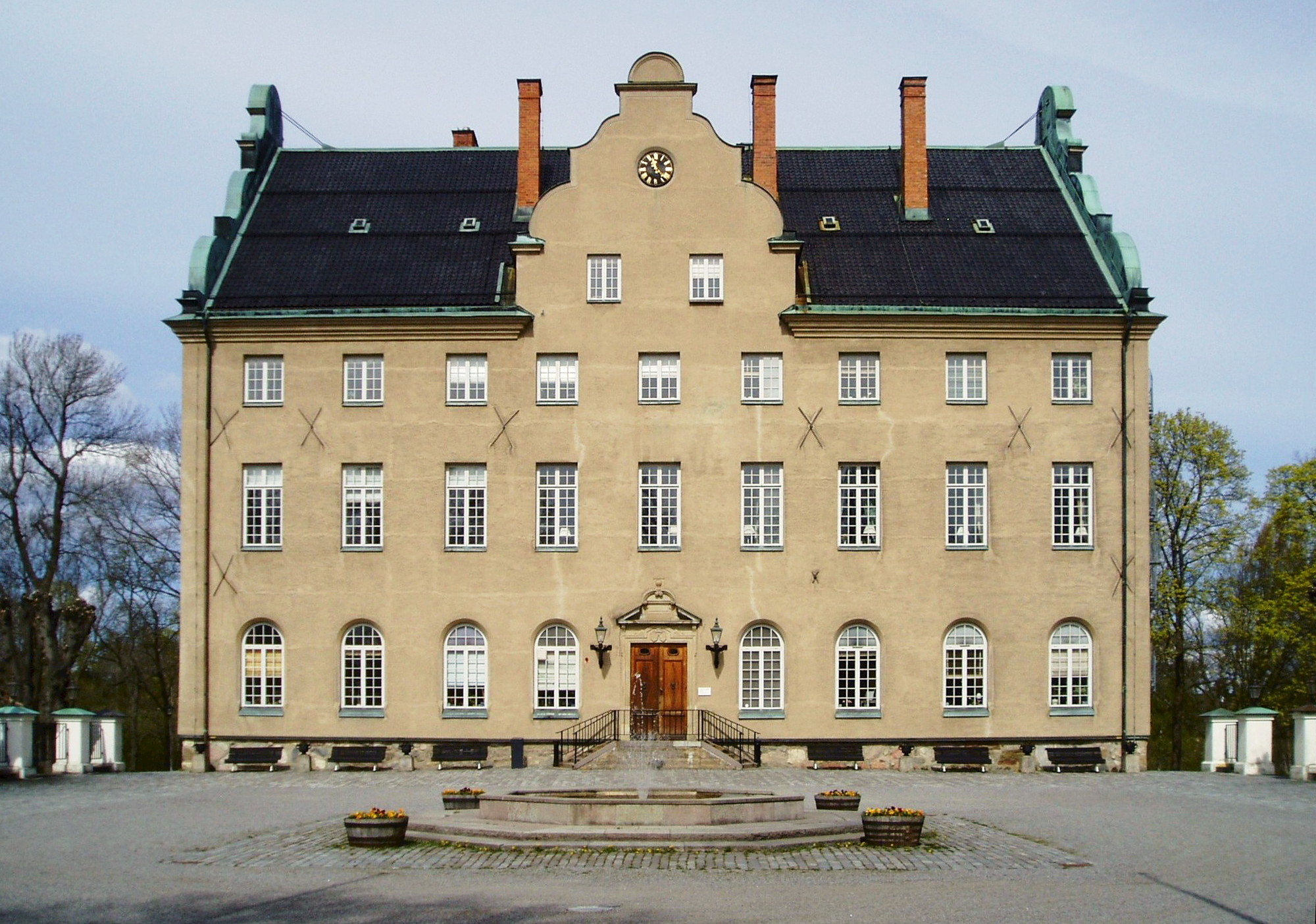
- Djursholm Castle

- Coat of arms

- Location within Stockholm Location within Sweden
- Coordinates: 59°23′50″N 18°05′15″E
- Country: Sweden
- Municipality: Danderyd Municipality
- County: Stockholm County
- Province: Uppland
- Charter: 1901
- Time zone: UTC+1 (CET)
  - Summer (DST): UTC+2 (CEST)

Djursholm (Swedish pronunciation: [jʉːʂˈhɔlm]) is one of four suburban districts in, and the seat of Danderyd Municipality, Stockholm County, Sweden. Djursholm is included in the multi-municipal Stockholm urban area. Djursholm is divided into a number of different areas: Djursholms Ekeby (northwest), Svalnäs (northeast), Ösby (central), Berga (southwest) and Gamla Djursholm ('Old Djursholm', southeast).

Since the community was founded in 1889, Djursholm has largely been characterized by villa buildings on large plots of land. However, over the years, the older houses have been supplemented with both more modern villas and city center buildings as well as smaller areas with apartment buildings. Several areas in the community consist of buildings typical of their time, characterised by styles such as romantic nationalism, neoclassicism and functionalism.

Djursholm, with approximately 9,300 inhabitants, is considered an exclusive residential area, with some of the country's most expensive addresses, and has been the residence of several notable representatives of Swedish finance and business, academia and cultural life.

== History ==
Djursholm was one of the first suburban communities in Sweden, its history as such beginning in 1889 with the founding of Djursholm AB (Djursholm Inc.) by Henrik Palme and the subsequent 1890 inauguration of the railway line connecting Djursholm to Stockholm, Djursholmsbanan. Since 1895 it has been served by electric suburban trains but the original branch was closed in 1975.

Djursholm is the wealthiest community in Sweden, with the most expensive property prices in the country. It was built as a garden city with large villas, most from the turn of the century, along winding roads. From the start, the elegant seaside quarters attracted many well known academics, cultural personalities and industrialists.

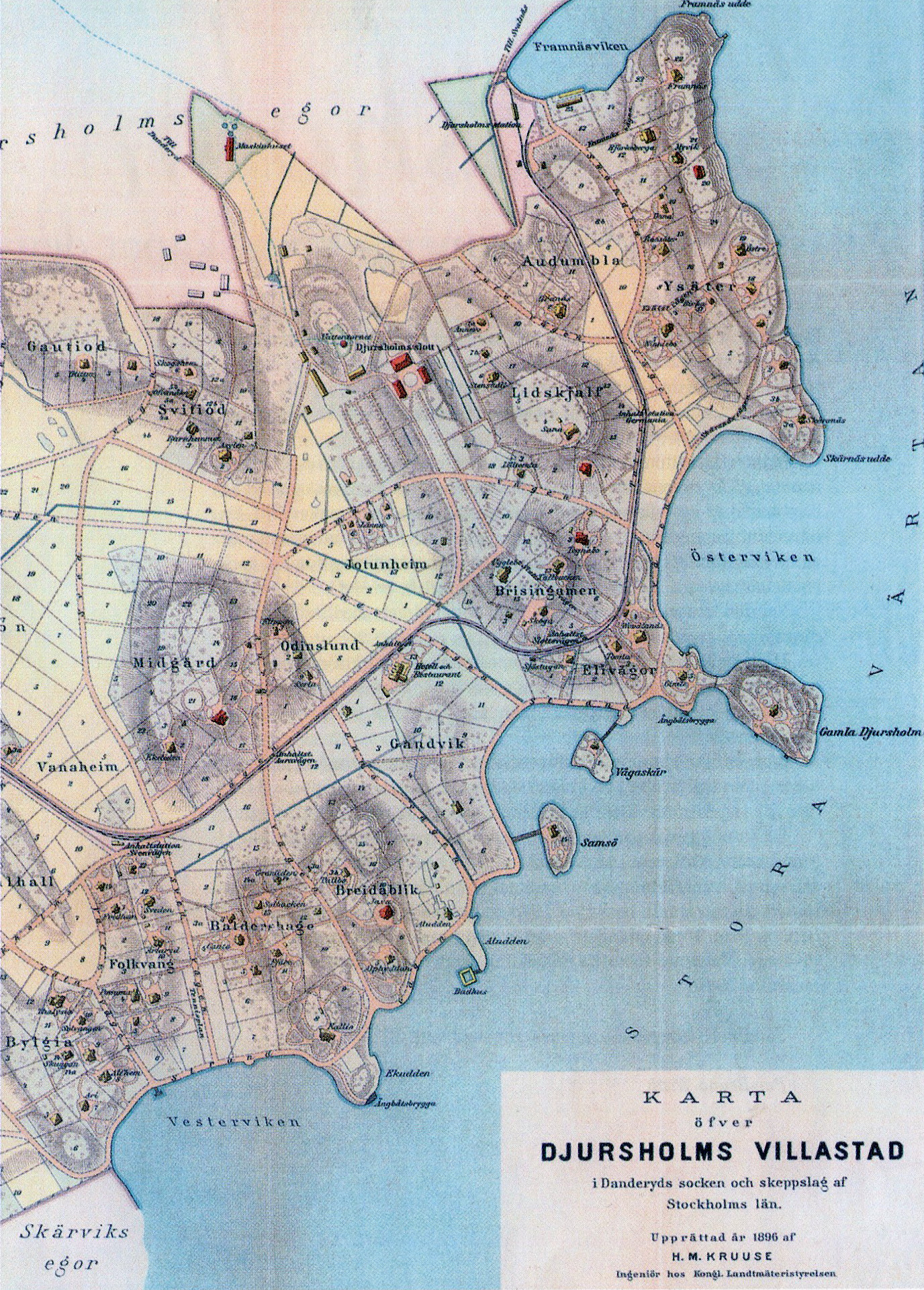
Djursholm town in 1896.

Djursholm was separated from Danderyd as a municipality of its own in 1901, becoming a city (Djursholms stad) in 1914. In 1971 it was reunited with Danderyd when the present municipality was created. Statistically, Djursholm lies within the Stockholm urban area.

== Sights ==
- Djursholm Castle: The original stone building was likely erected by Nils Eskilsson Banér in the 15th century. Svante Gustavsson Banér commissioned a refurbishment of the castle to its current form in the 16th century
- Djursholm Chapel. Completed in 1902 on the initiative of Fredrik Lilljekvist, who was also the architect. The ornate altar paintings are by Natanael Beskow, who was the resident vicar at the time.
- Villa Pauli: Large villa on Strandvägen in central Djursholm, designed by Ragnar Östberg and completed in 1907. Since 1986, Villa Pauli has been a private club with a gourmet restaurant, banquet room and hotel.
- Germania beach. Sandy beach that has become a popular destination for people from Djursholm and surrounding areas. Situated at the end of Strandvägen and Germaniavägen, two of the central roads of Djursholm.

== Gallery ==
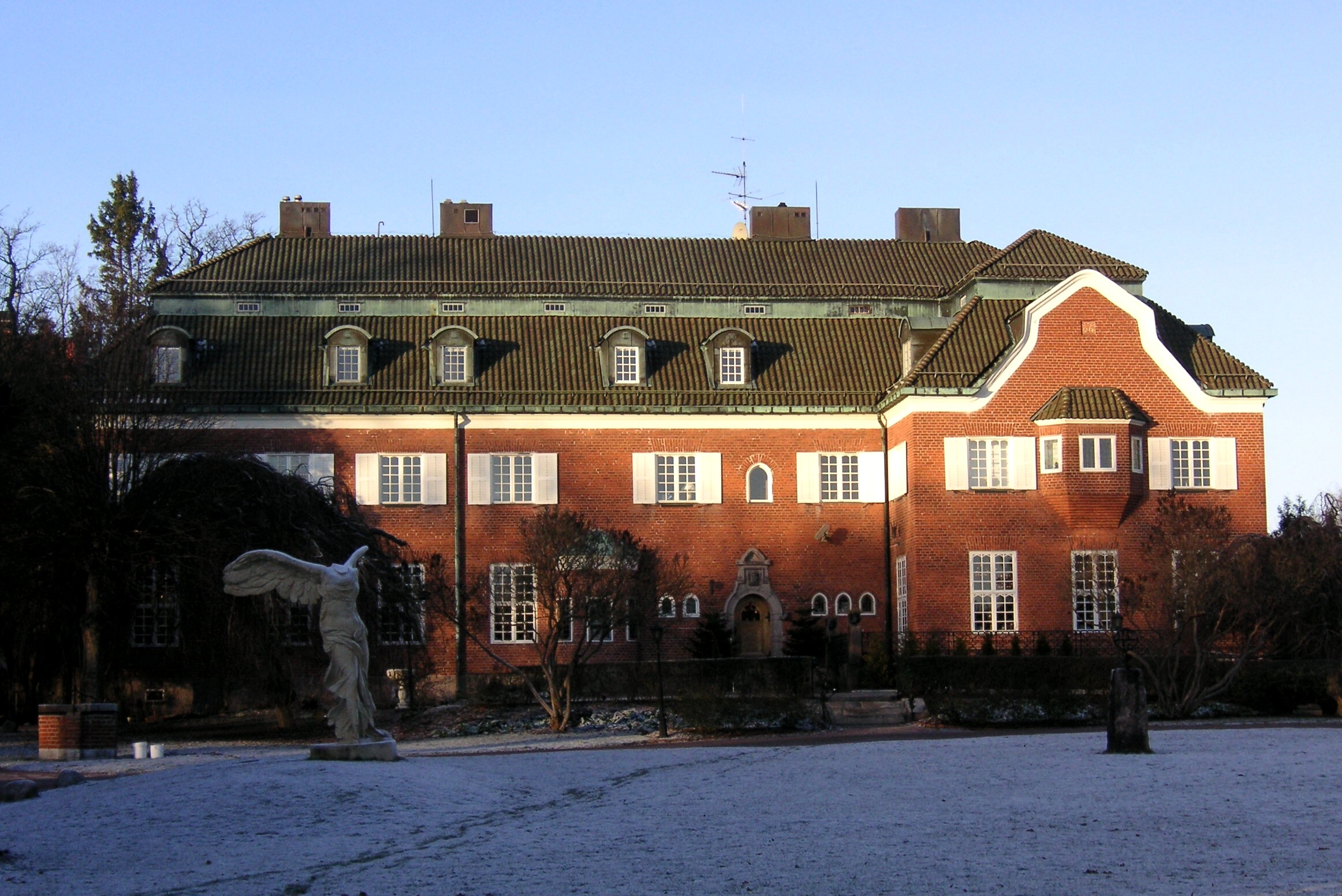
Villa Pauli (Ragnar Östberg)

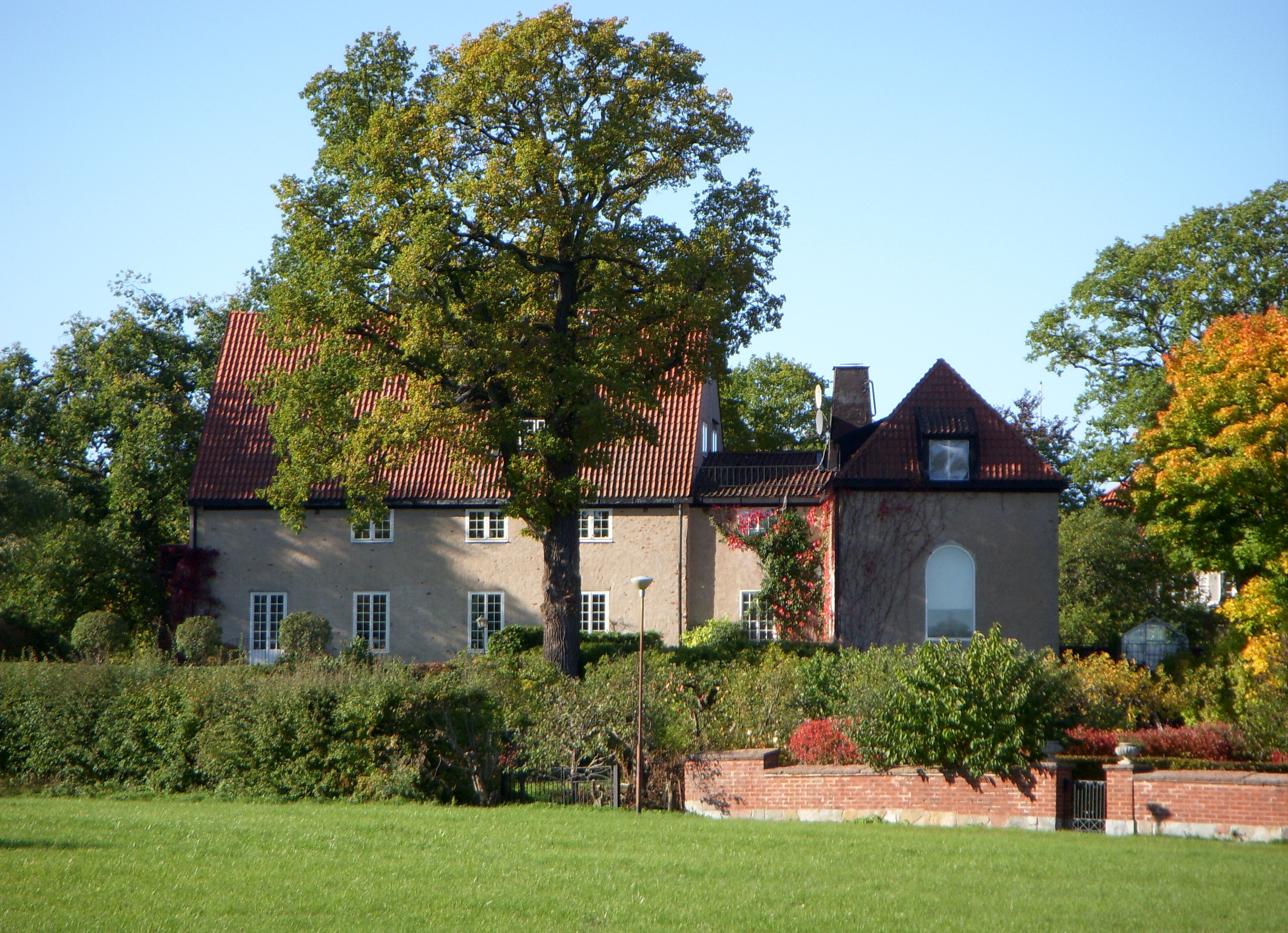
Villa Lagerkrantz (Elis Benckert)

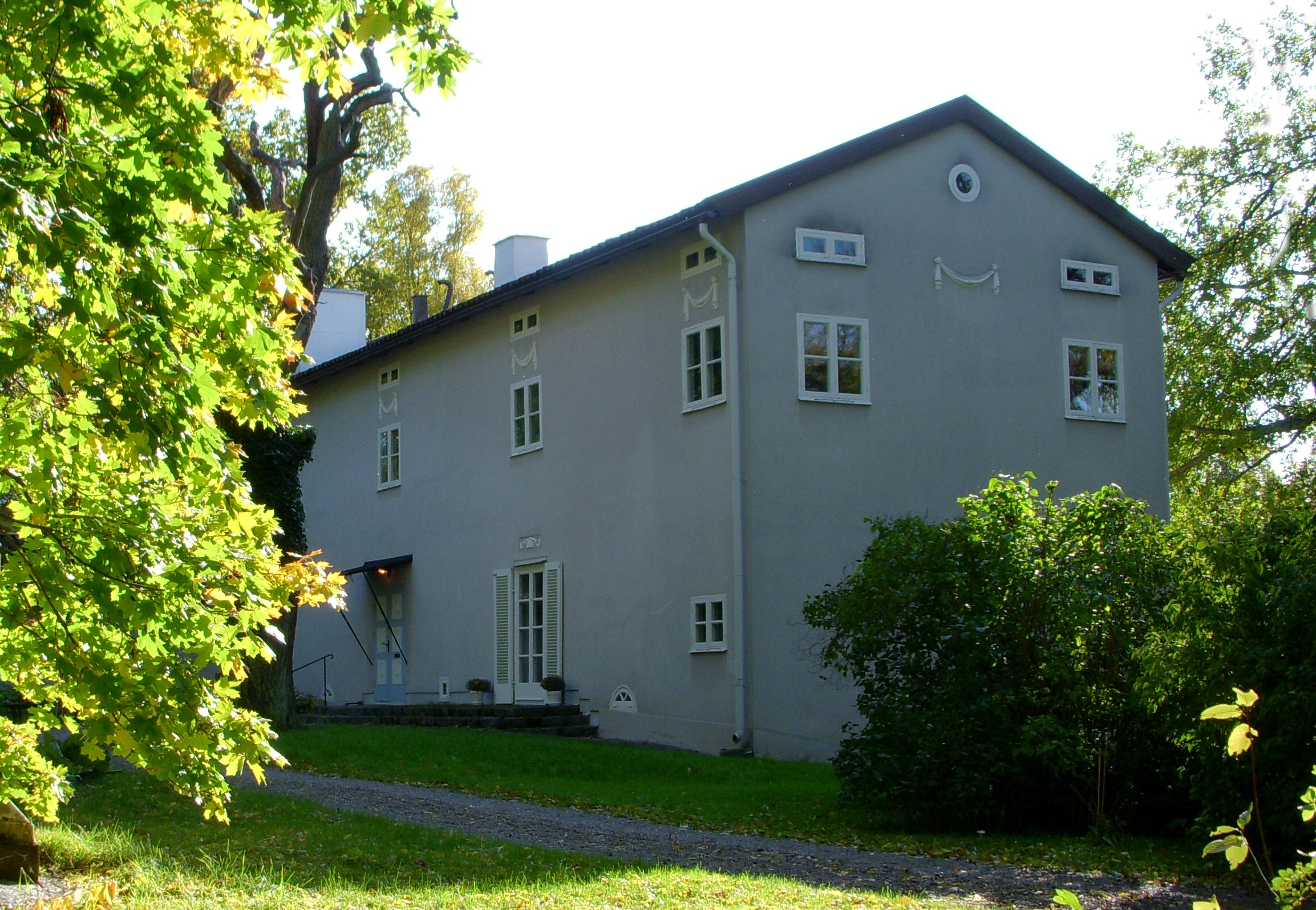
Villa Snellman (Gunnar Asplund)

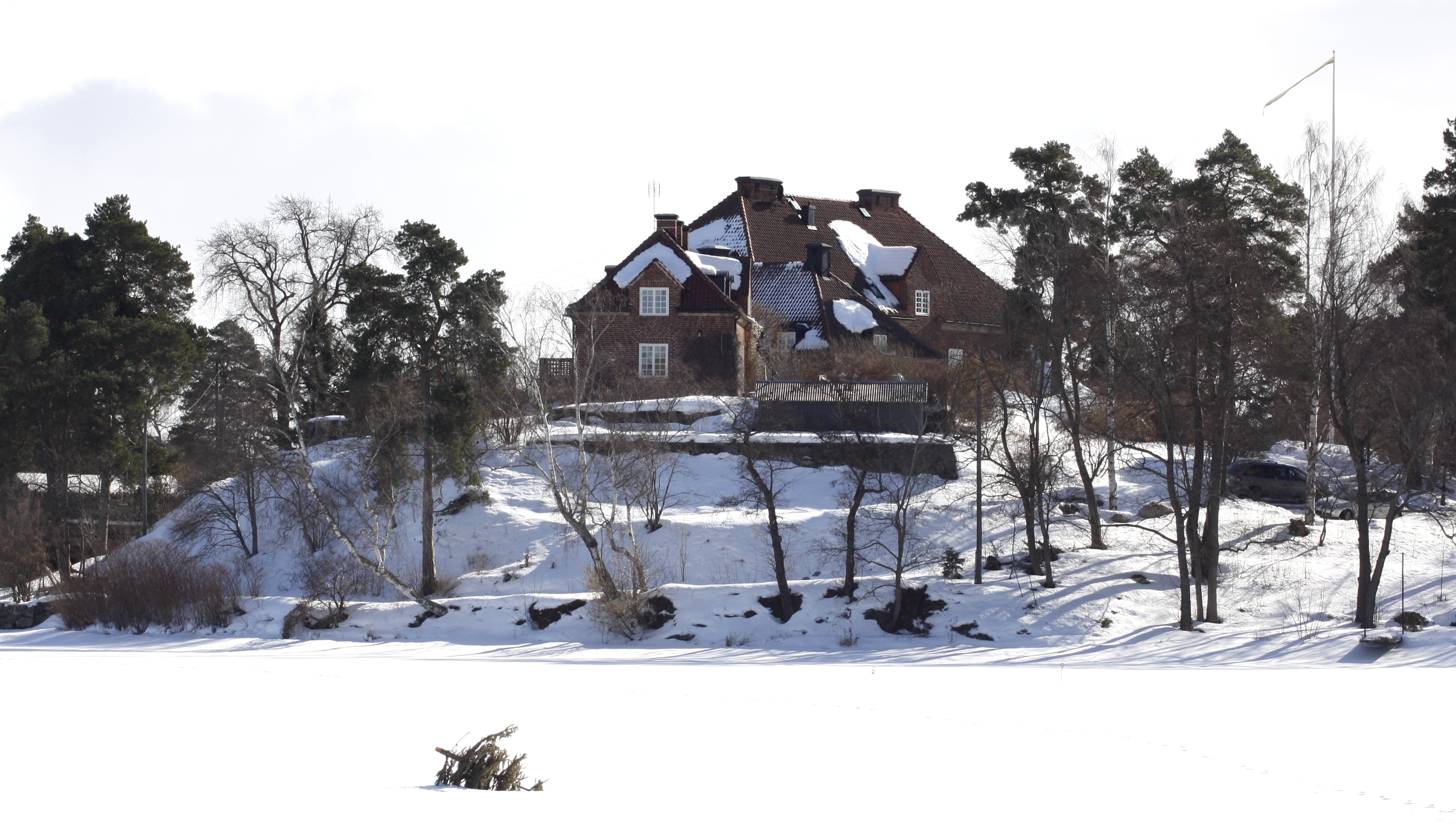
Gamla Djursholm (Carl Westman)

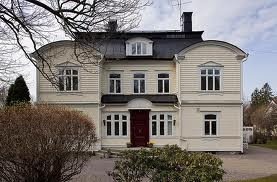
Prinsvillan (Gustaf Hermansson)

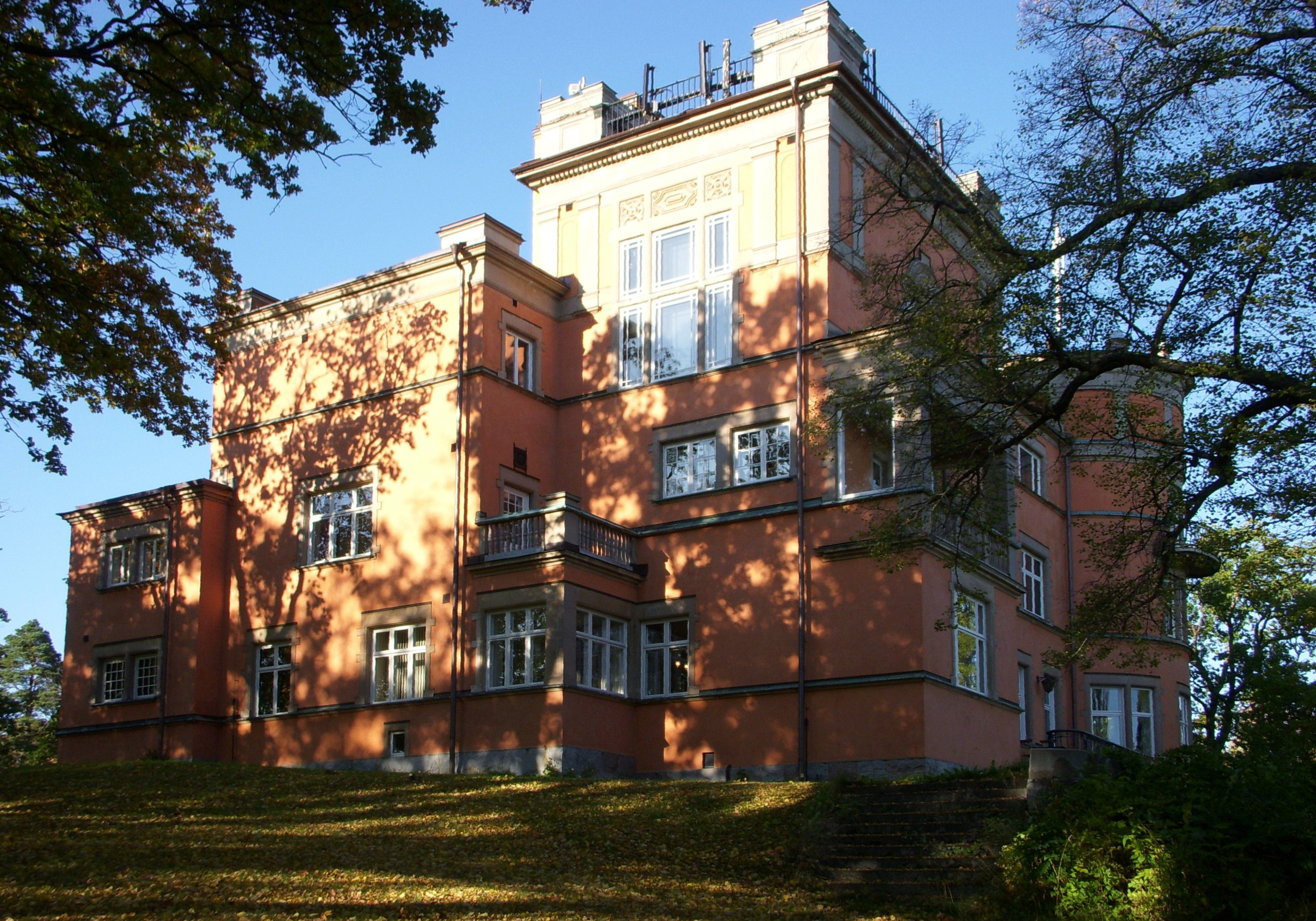
Villa Mittag-Leffler (Ferdinand Boberg)

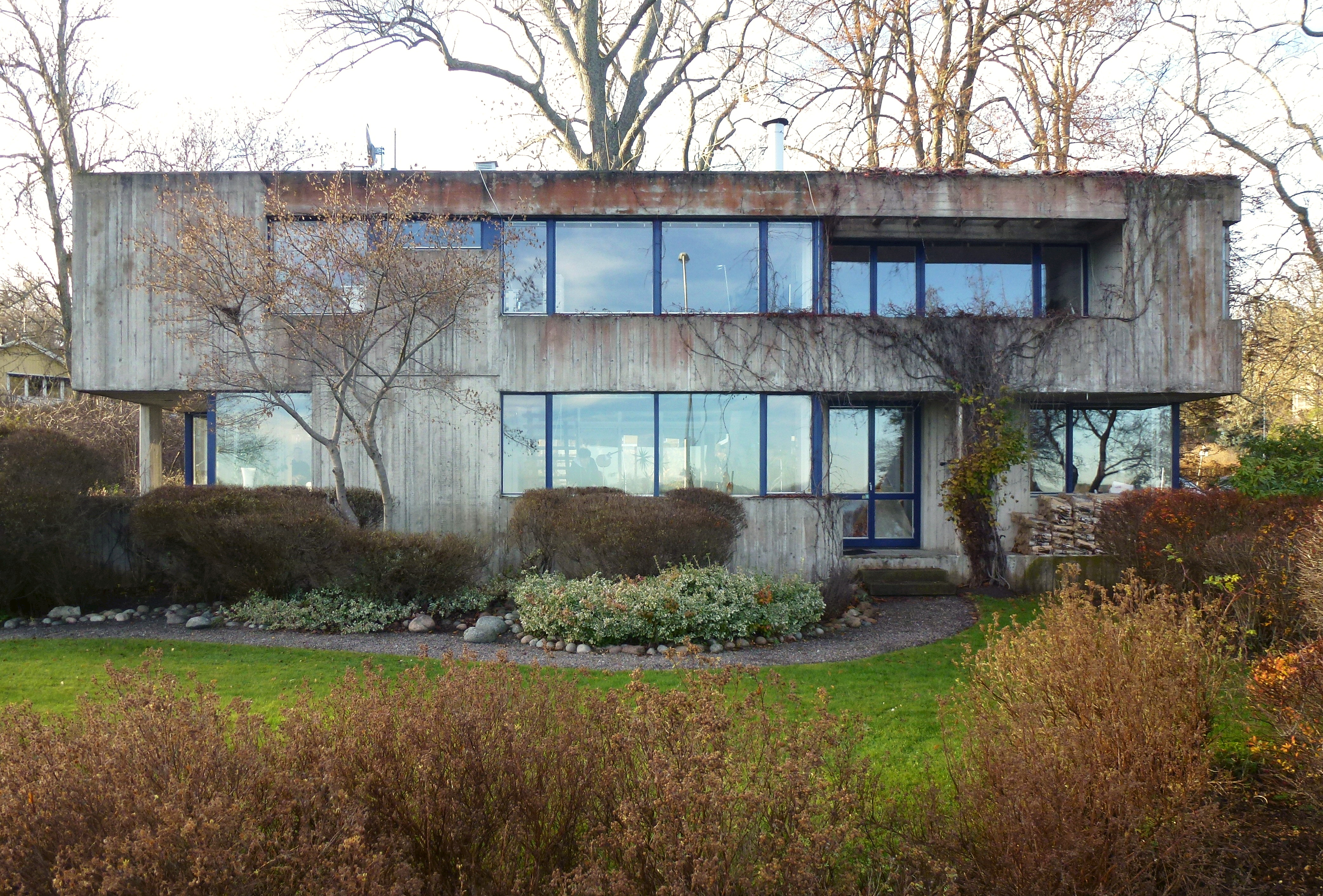
Villa Dehlin (Léonie Geisendorf)

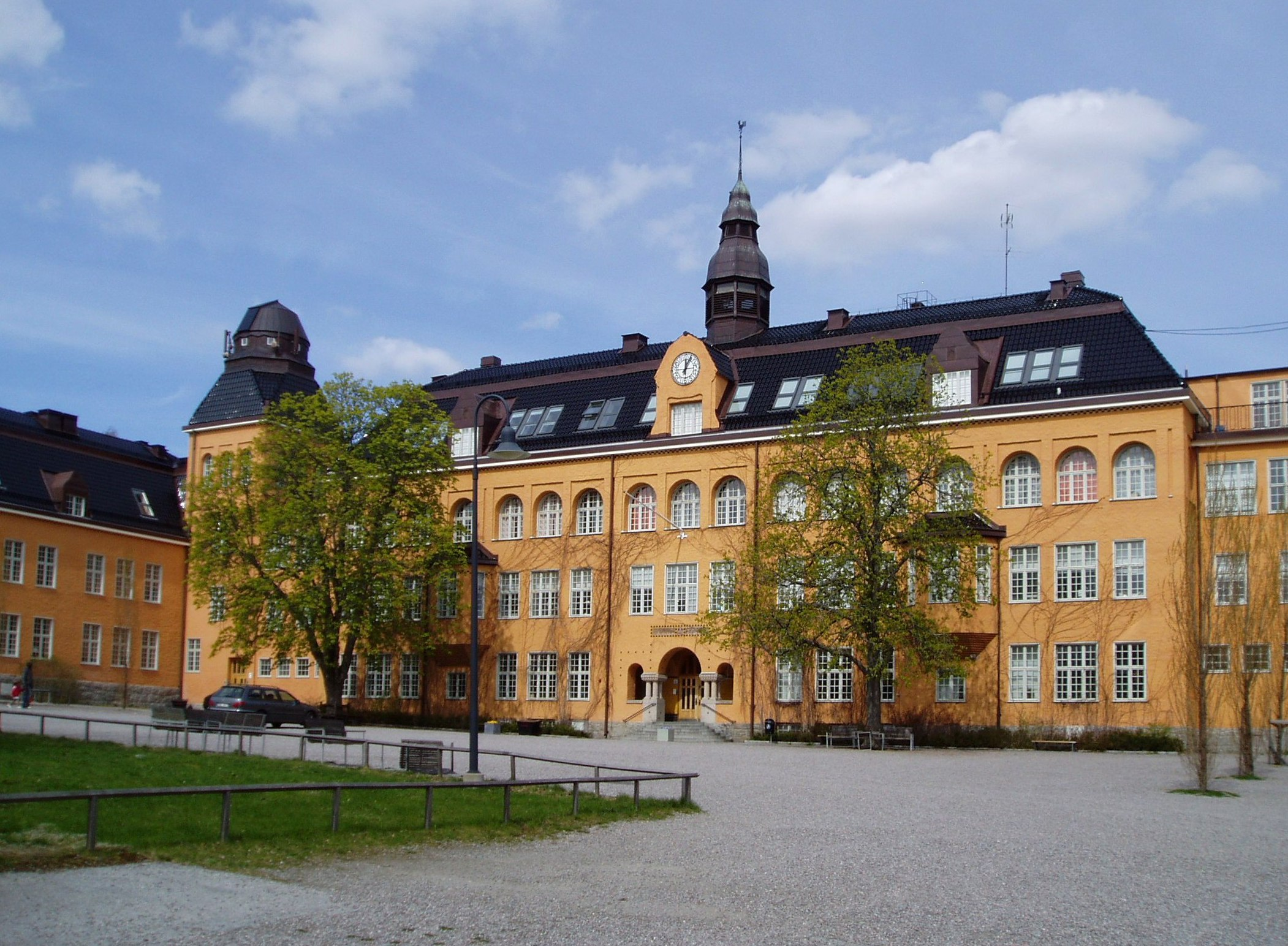
Viktor Rydbergs samskola (Georg A. Nilsson)

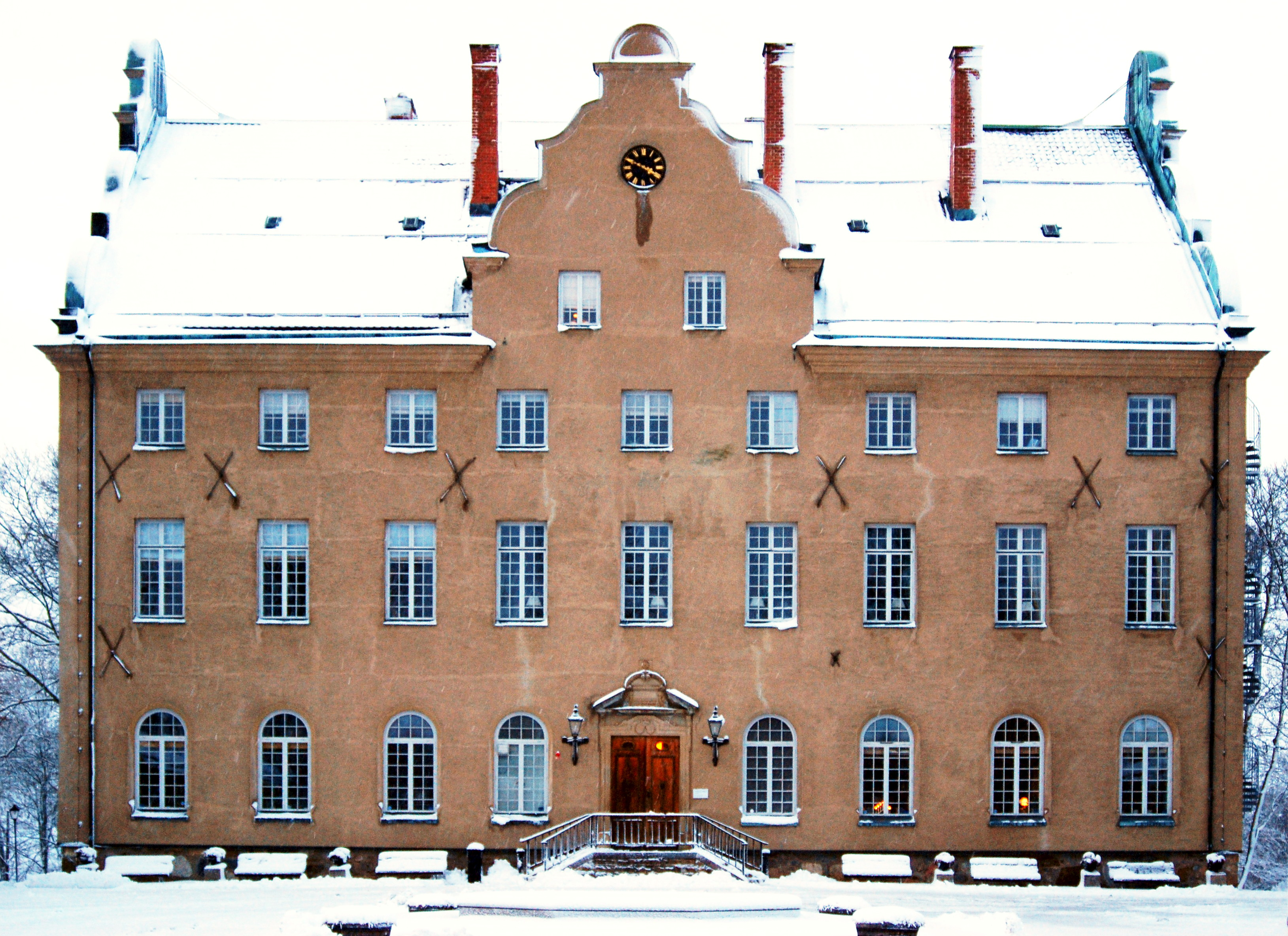
Djursholm Castle (Gustaf Banér)

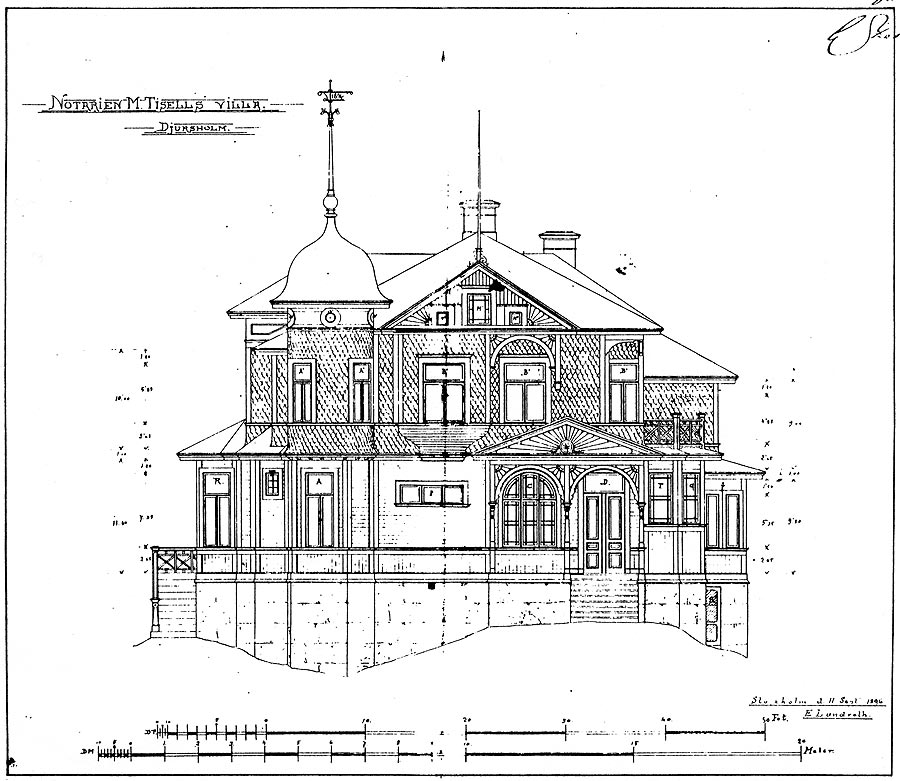
Villa Lorride (Ernst Lundroth)

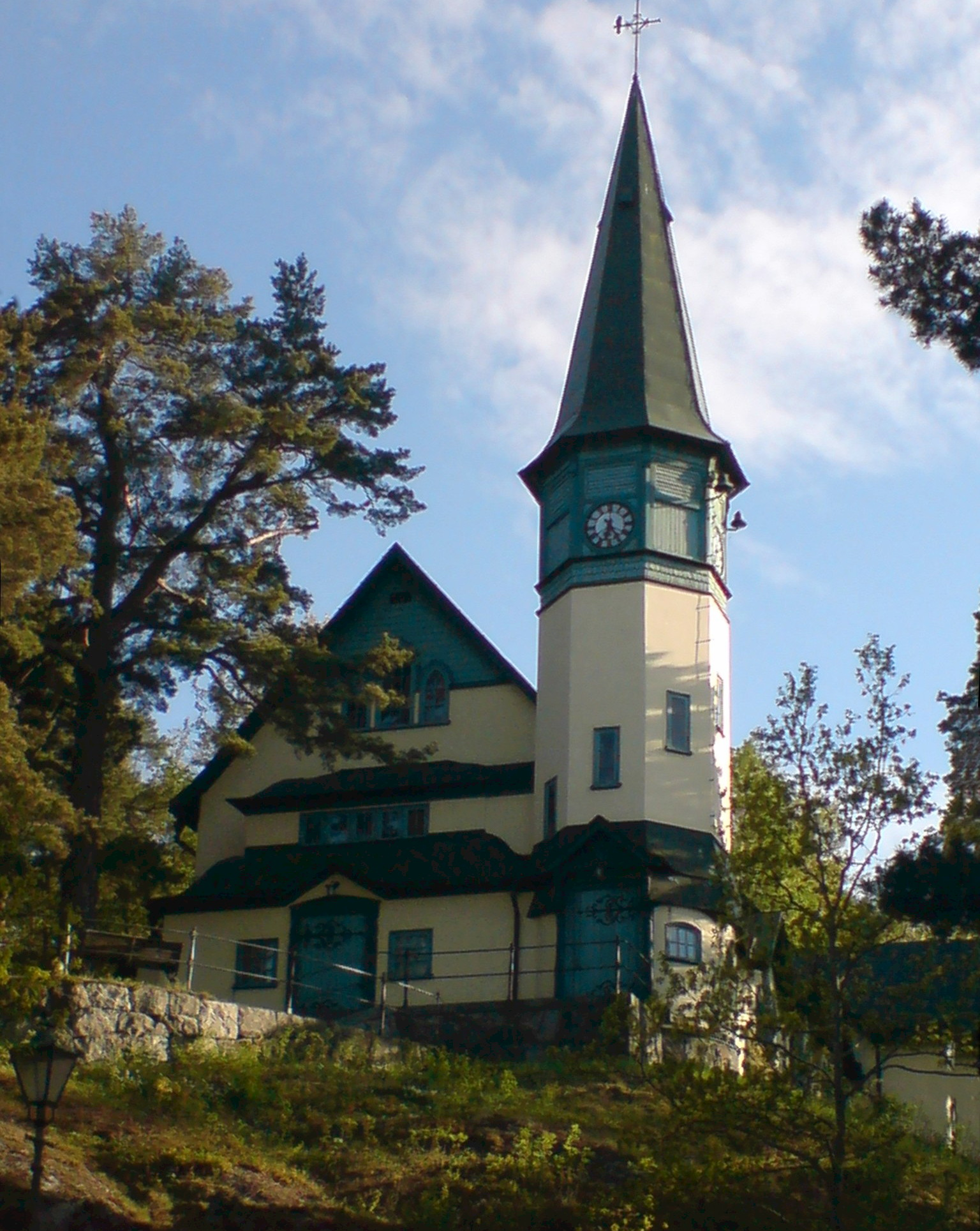
Djursholm Chapel (Fredrik Lilljekvist)

== Notable inhabitants ==
- Alice Tegnér, artist
- Annika Falkengren, industrialist
- Annika Linde, state epidemiologist
- Bertil Hult, industrialist
- Björn Ulvaeus, musician (ABBA)
- Charlotte Perrelli, singer
- Elizabeth Hesselblad, saint
- Elsa Beskow, artist and author
- Fredrik Lundberg, industrialist
- Gösta Mittag-Leffler, mathematician
- Hannes Alfvén, nobel laureate in physics
- Ingvar Kjellson, actor
- Jacob Wallenberg, industrialist
- Jakob Lindberg, musician
- Jan Carlzon, industrialist
- Jenny Syquia, model and designer
- Johan Banér, fieldmarshall
- Magnus Uggla, singer and songwriter
- Marie Fredriksson, musician (Roxette)
- Natanael Beskow, preacher, author, artist
- Robert Thegerström, artist
- Robin Söderling, former professional tennis player
- Stefan Persson, industrialist
- Tove Lo, singer and songwriter
- Verner von Heidenstam, author
- Viktor Rydberg, author
