= Villa Pauli, Djursholm =

Coordinates: 59.3937°N 18.0919°E

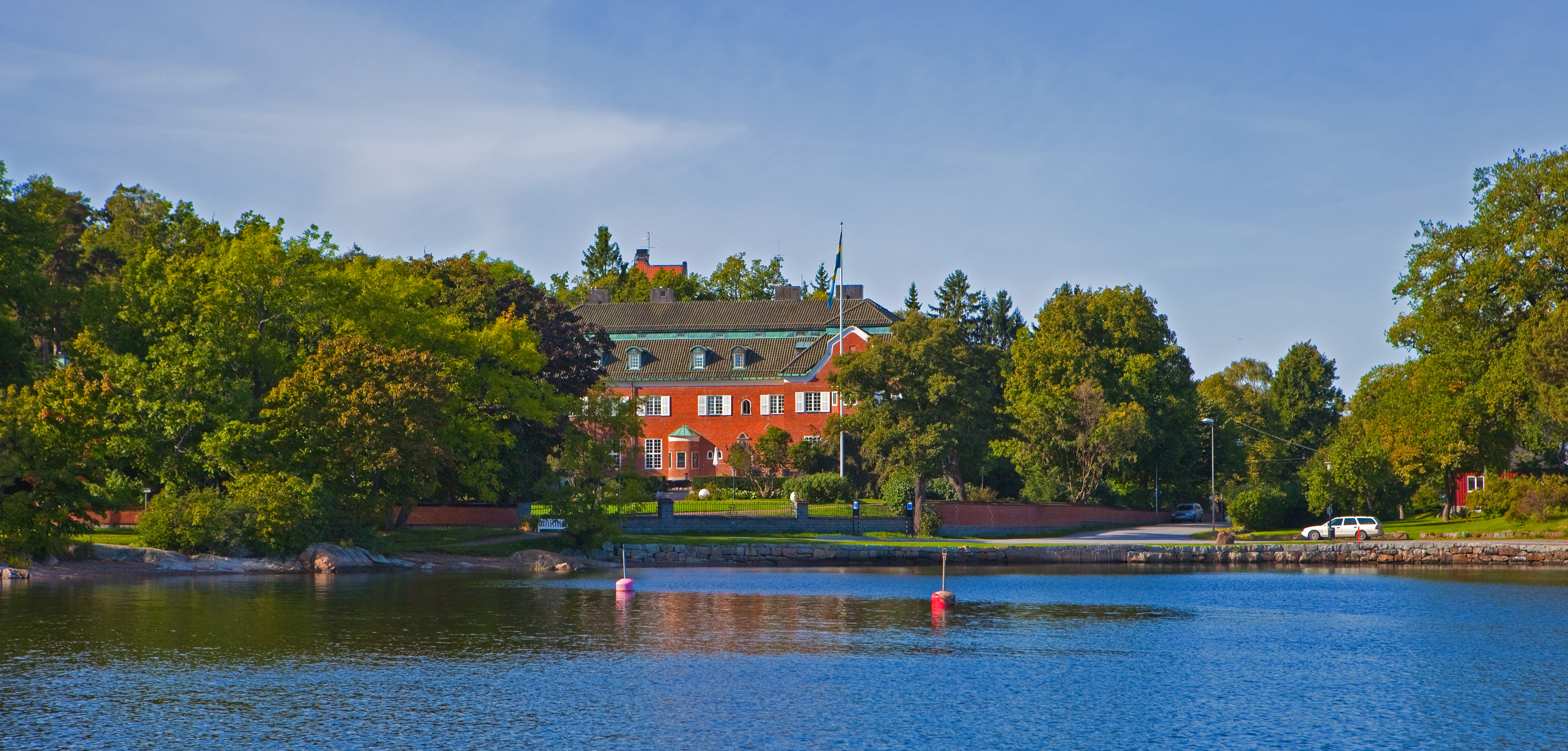
Villa Pauli seen from the Stora Värtan

Villa Pauli is a villa and club located at Strandvägen 19 in the suburb of Djursholm and county of Stockholm, Sweden. It lies on the shore of the Stora Värtan some 8 kilometres (5.0 mi) north of the centre of the city of Stockholm.

The villa was built in 1907 by Anna Pauli, the daughter of Johan Wilhelm Smitt, the wealthiest man in Sweden in the 19th century. He made a fortune in Latin America in the 1850s, co-founded the Enskilda Bank and founded Handelsbanken. He then funded Alfred Nobel’s Nitroglycerine Corporation and became its Chairman 1864-1904. Together with his young relative Ragnar Sohlman, he became instrumental in establishing the Nobel Foundation and the Nobel Prize based on Alfred’s testament. He also financed the establishment of the University of Stockholm.

The villa, designed by famous architect Ragnar Östberg, was richly decorated with works by the painter Georg Pauli and sculptor Carl Eldh. It remained a private residence until 1968, when it was acquired by the Catholic Church for the purpose of visiting cardinals and was used as a convent. Pope John Paul II has stayed there.

In 1985, the villa was acquired by the real estate magnate Birger Gustavsson, who converted into a club for corporate members that opened September 1986. Arnfinn Röste bought the club in 1998 and upgraded and redecorated it, including interior decoration featuring antiques, original art and sculptures. Many companies use the Villa Pauli Club as a venue for an event, fashion show or product launch.
