= Prinsvillan, Djursholm =

Building of cultural interest

Coordinates: 59.39953°N 18.08906°E

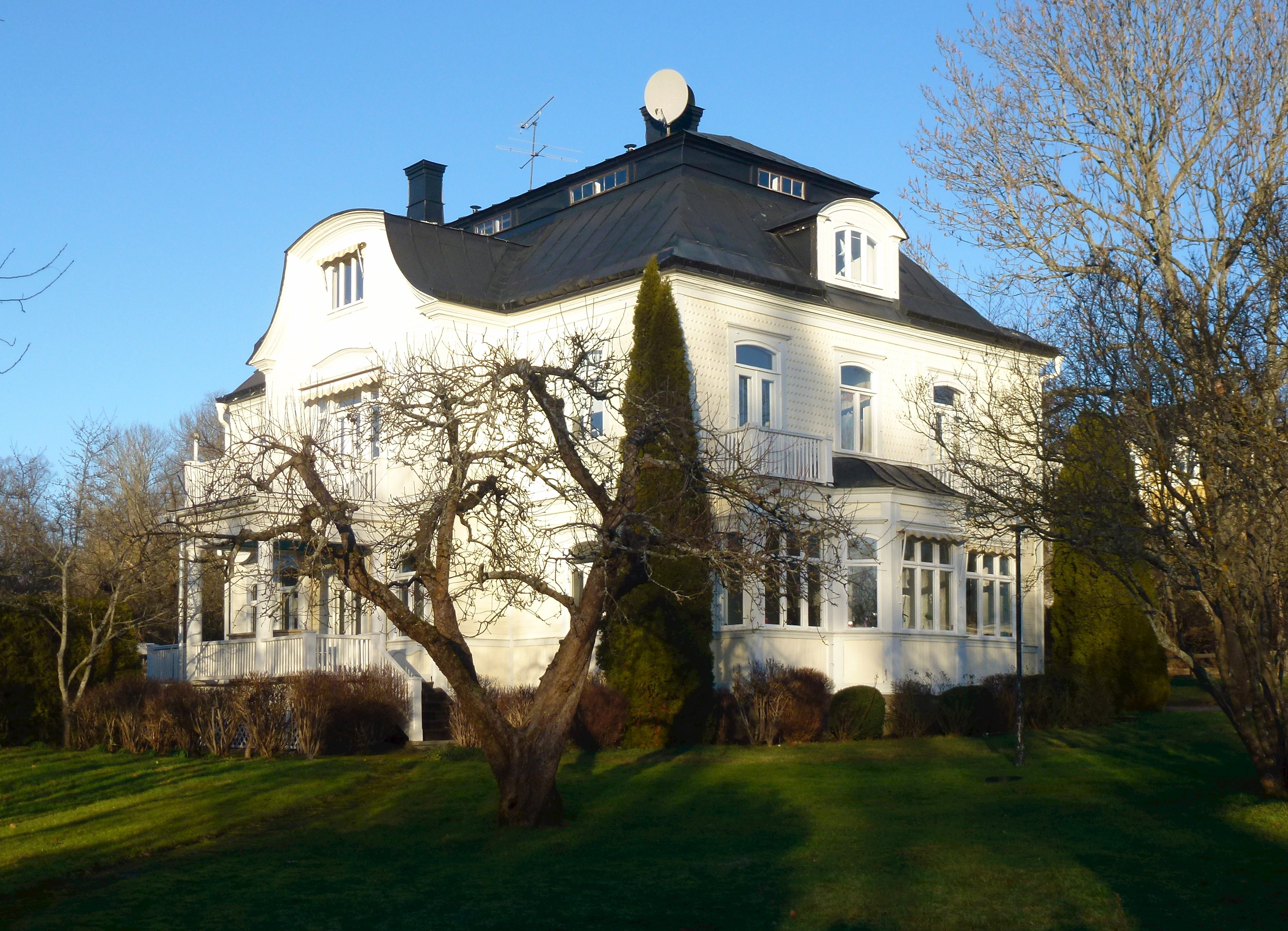
Prinsvillan, from Germaniavägen

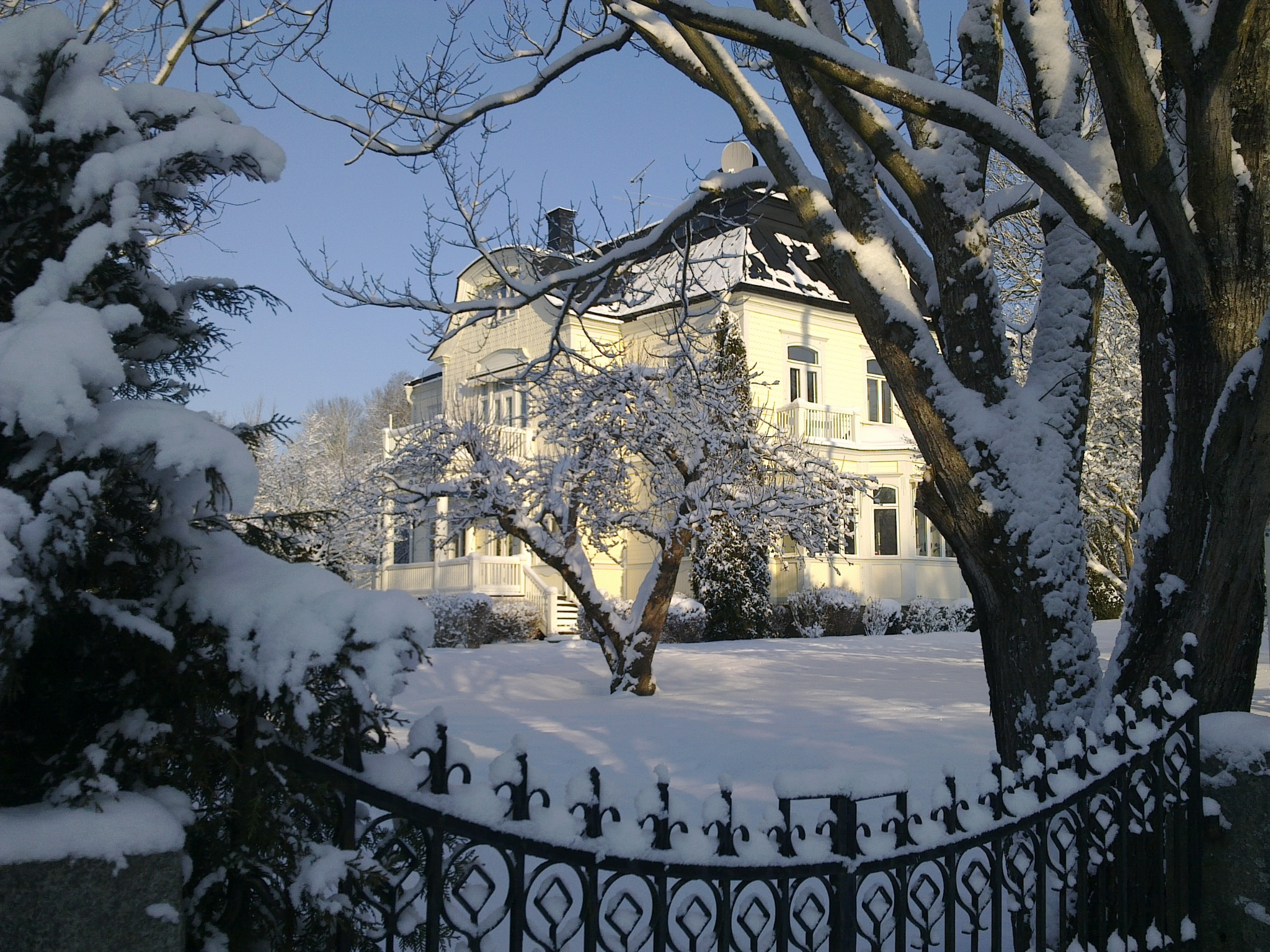
Prinsvillan, during winter

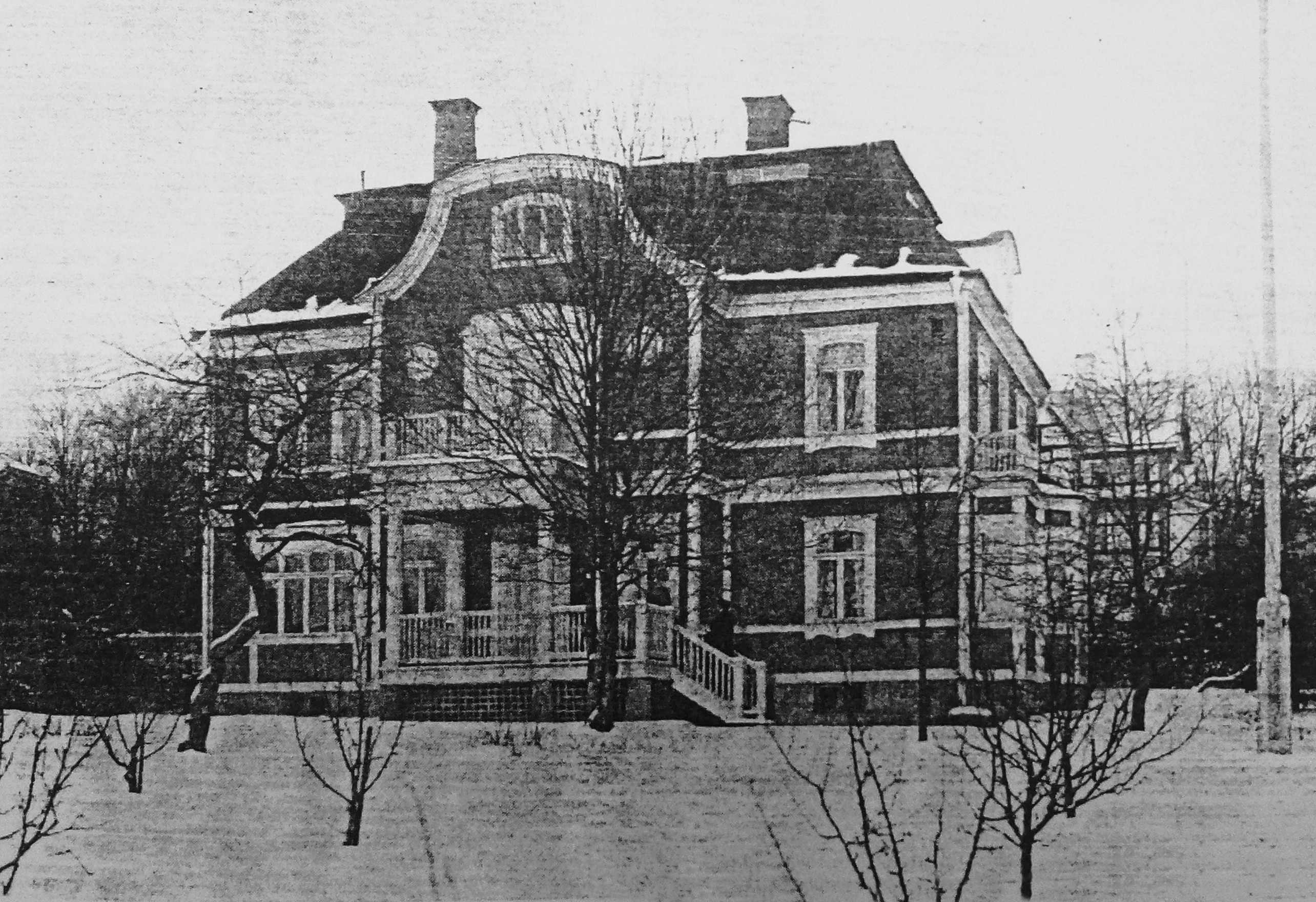
Prinsvillan, ca 1910

Prinsvillan (the Prince Villa) is a villa on Germaniavägen 14 A in Djursholm by architects Axel Viktor Forsberg and Gustaf Hermansson. It is situated in the Grotte quarter near Djursholm Castle and is also called Grottevillan or Grotte 7.

The villa was initially built in 1905 by Forsberg, but was redesigned and expanded significantly during 1908–1909 by Hermansson in the jugend inspired country mansion style typical in Sweden at the turn of the 20th century.

The villa was built for Prince Erik, Duke of Västmanland (1889–1918), the youngest son of Gustaf V of Sweden, who suffered from epilepsy and lived a withdrawn life. It is, however, unclear when Prince Erik lived in the villa.

In the period around the First World War the villa was residence for senior military officers. The villa has been privately owned since the 1930s and was during the 2000s a residence for the South African embassy in Sweden. Bishop Desmund Tutu visited the villa in 2004. The villa was given a preservation order as a building of national cultural interest in 2013.

== Sources ==
- Fredric Bedoire, Svenska slott och herrgårdar, Albert Bonniers Förlag 2006, ISBN 978-91-0-010577-8
- Olof Hultin, Guide till Stockholms arkitektur, Stockholm Arkitektur Förlag, 2002, ISBN 978-91-86050-72-6
- Staffan Skott, Alla dessa Bernadottar, Stockholm Bonnier, 1996, ISBN 91-0-056022-7
