= Scharinska villan =

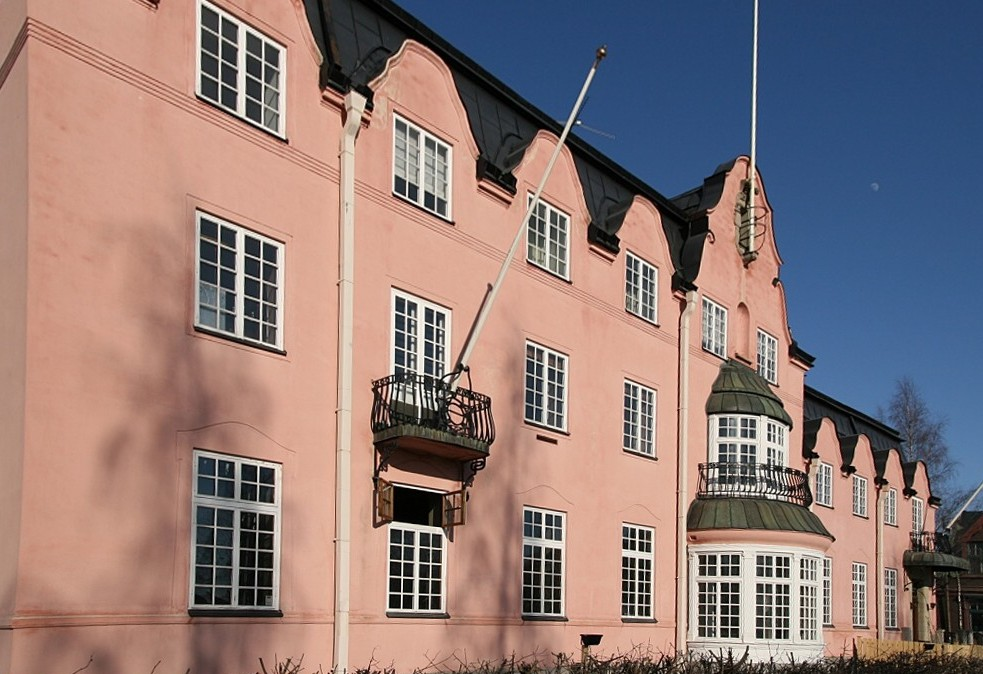
- Scharinska villan
- Interactive map of the Scharinska villan area

General information
- Status: Listed buildings in Sweden
- Type: Villa
- Architectural style: Victorian
- Location: Storgatan 63-65, Umeå, Sweden
- Coordinates: 63°49′25″N 20°16′17″E
- Completed: 1904-1905
- Owner: Umeå Municipality

Design and construction
- Architect: Ragnar Östberg

Website
- scharinska.se

Scharinska villan is a pink building at the street Storgatan 63-65, located next to Döbelns park in Umeå, Sweden. Scharinska villan was designed by the architect Ragnar Östberg and it was erected in 1904-1905 for Egil Unander-Scharin and his family. In the 1950s the building also housed the family business AB Scharins Söner.

== The building ==
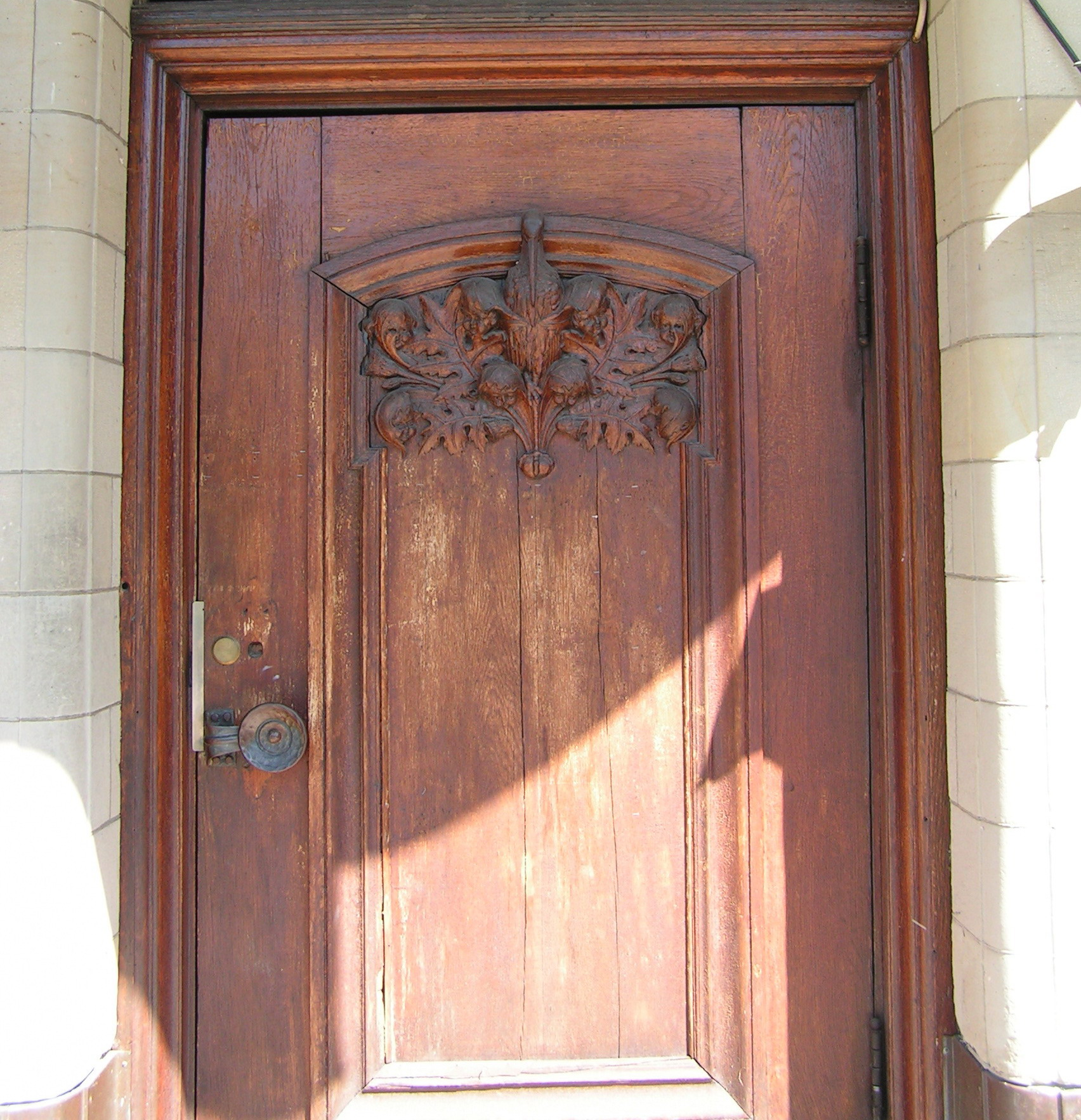
Scharinska villan's door with a relief drawn by Ragnar Östberg.

The exterior of the building is somewhat Victorian. There is a gable crest over the windows, with prominent arched windows on the ground floor. The small Rococo inspired balconies are wrought iron. The house is three stories high, with a volume offset to one side which is contrasting with the otherwise consistent symmetry. The refurbish facade is slightly reddish with a frieze under the third floor's row of windows. Also the interior is lavish with wood-paneled walls, except in the so-called Spanish Hall, whose renovated walls are covered in mosaics from Spain.

The front door at the main entrance has a scene in relief that is designed by Ragnar Östberg. The subject is an abundant foliage with the faces of seven kids with a stork in the middle. The seven faces symbolize the seven children in the Scharin family. Scharinska villan is considered one of Östberg's best works during his youth.

A hedge runs around the property towards the streets Storgatan and Döbelnsgatan. South of the gardener's house there is a paved garden (with brick colored concrete tiles), surrounded by arched metal trellis to the south and west and a metal rail towards the east. To the north of the building there is a paved parking lot. The parking lot also serves as an entrance to the municipal real estate concern Bostaden's headquarters.

=== The gardener's house ===
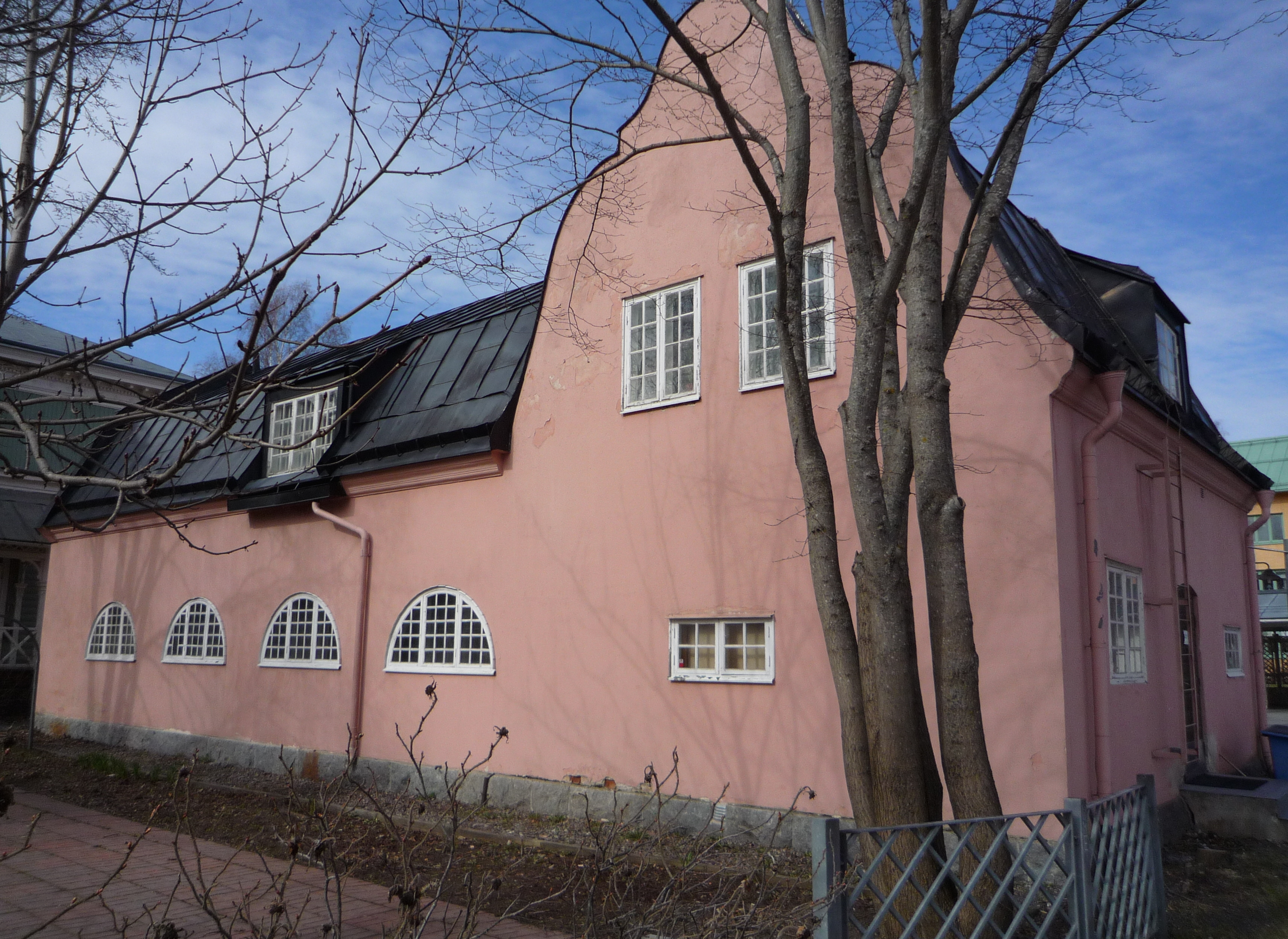
The gardener's house, from the south.

An outbuilding, also known as the annexe or gardener's house, belongs to the villa. The outbuilding is located west of the main building and it has a style that connects to the villa. The outhouse is one floor with a furnished loft in the western part, and is one and a half floor in the eastern part. The outhouse originally was the home for the gardener of the villa, and stables with accommodation for a coachman. The greenhouse that for a long time was located at its southern side was demolished in the 1980s. The outhouse, whose interior is not classified as a protected building, has in modern times been redone into four garages with brown glazed hinged doors made of wood.

== History ==
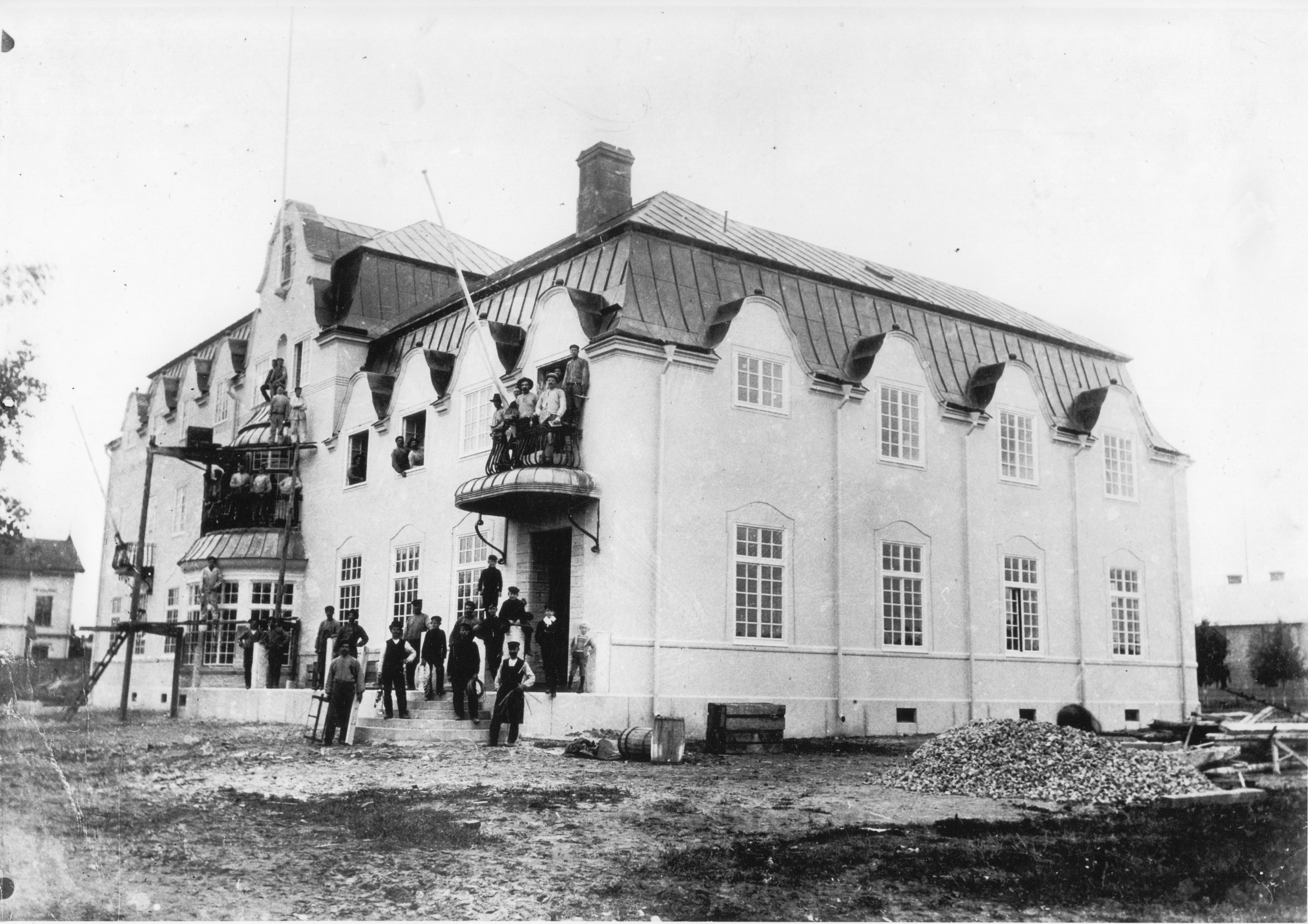
Scharinska villan during construction in 1905.

When planning for a new house the superintendent Egil Unander-Scharin contacted several architects, including Gustav Hermansson who had designed many houses in Sundsvall (after the devastating fire that burnt down the city in 1888) and Ernst Stenhammar who was the architect for Svenska Handelsbanken's bank building in Umeå, built in 1894. Unander-Scharin was not happy with their suggestions and instead gave the assignment to architect Östberg.

On July 4, 1904 Unander-Scharin was granted building permits for plot 2 and 3 in block Härmod (plot 1 was already developed) and already the day after the excavation for the house foundation started. On July 14, Unander-Scharin paid 7,894.85 to Umeå city for the two plots. The placement of these plots was the result of the city plan from 1889, where all plots within the area affected by the city fire in 1888 were redrawn. Unander-Scharin two plots had been vacant since the fire. The final cost for the villa was estimated to be 94,000, of which 12,000 was for furnishing and 4,000 kronor for Östberg's architectural drawings.

=== In modern times ===
In 1959 the Scharin family sold the building to Umeå municipality who restored the villa and made several changes as the municipality was planning to use the villa for student union activities. Since then, the municipality has deeded the building to activities for association and Students' unions. The same year that Scharinska villan became a listed building in 1981, it was agreed between Umeå municipality and Umeå Student Union and Universum how the building should be used. Following a call for tenders in 1996 Umeå Student Union of Science and Technology moved into the house, but they withdrew from the contract at the turn of 2003/2004. The operation, which has hitherto been in nonprofit auspices, was taken over by Ekonomiska Föreningen för Alternativ Kultur i Umeå (EFAK) (Economic Association of Alternative Culture in Umeå), who re-inaugurate the villa in the autumn of 2004.

During the years 2006-2013 the activity in the villa was privately run as a rock club called Scharinska, with a banquet room, cellar pub, a tavern and a stage for live music. At the turn of 2013/2014 the business was moved to the new Guitars – the museum at Vasaskolan.

In the autumn of 2013 a major exterior renovation of the building began, and on January 31, 2014 and interior renovation began that is expected to take one year. In the meantime, the tenants leave.

== Printed sources ==
- Andrén, Brit-Marie; Rosén Gull-Mari (1980). Ett par kulturyttringar i Umeå under sekelskiftet. Umeå: Umeå universitetsbibliotek. ISBN 91-7174-066-X. libris: 7615340.
- Eriksson, Karin (1975). Studier i Umeå stads byggnadshistoria: från 1621 till omkring 1895 (PDF). Umeå studies in the humanities, 0345-0155; 3. Umeå: Umeå universitetsbibliotek. ISBN 91-7174-000-7. libris=7615280.
- Olofsson, Sven Ingemar; Eriksson Karin (1972). Umeå stads historia 1888-1972. Umeå: Umeå kommunfullmäktige. libris=88277.
