= Listed buildings in Stockholm County =

There are 174 listed buildings (Swedish: byggnadsminne) in Stockholm County.

== Botkyrka Municipality ==
Image	Name	Premise	Number of buildings	Year built	Architect	Coordinates	ID
	Tumba pappersbruk	Tumba 7:240, 7:239 previously 7:112	54			59.20122°N 17.81723°E	21300000013048

== Danderyd Municipality ==
Image	Name	Premise	Number of buildings	Year built	Architect	Coordinates	ID
	Djursholms kapell	Breidablick 24	1			59.39441°N 18.08933°E	21300000013069
	Villa Lagercrantz	Ran 16	1			59.41163°N 18.09098°E	21300000013057
	Villa Lorride	Lorride 7	1			59.40172°N 18.09365°E	21300000013058
	Villa Snellman	Idun 11	1			59.39177°N 18.07676°E	21300000013059
	Villa Tallom	Långängstorp 19	1			59.38301°N 18.06974°E	21300000013074

== Ekerö Municipality ==
placeholder

== Haninge Municipality ==
placeholder

== Järfälla Municipality ==
placeholder

== Lidingö Municipality ==
placeholder

== Nacka Municipality ==
placeholder

== Norrtälje Municipality ==
placeholder

== Nynäshamn Municipality ==
placeholder

== Salem Municipality ==
placeholder

== Sigtuna Municipality ==
placeholder

== Solna Municipality ==
placeholder

== Stockholm Municipality ==
placeholder

== Sundbyberg Municipality ==
placeholder

== Södertälje Municipality ==
placeholder

== Tyresö Municipality ==
placeholder

== Täby Municipality ==
placeholder

== Upplands Bro Municipality ==
placeholder

== Upplands Väsby Municipality ==
placeholder

== Vaxholm Municipality ==
placeholder

== Värmdö Municipality ==
placeholder

== Österåker Municipality ==
placeholder
