= Vattubrinken =

- Location within Stockholm Location within Sweden Location within European Union
- Coordinates: 59°14′N 17°35′E
- Country: Sweden
- Province: Södermanland
- County: Stockholm County
- Municipality: Södertälje Municipality

Area
  - Total: 0.69 km^{2} (0.27 sq mi)

Population (31 December 2020)
  - Total: 385
  - Density: 560/km^{2} (1,400/sq mi)
- Time zone: UTC+1 (CET)
  - Summer (DST): UTC+2 (CEST)

Vattubrinken is a locality situated in Södertälje Municipality, Stockholm County, Sweden with 332 inhabitants in 2010.
