= Tuna, Södertälje =

Tuna
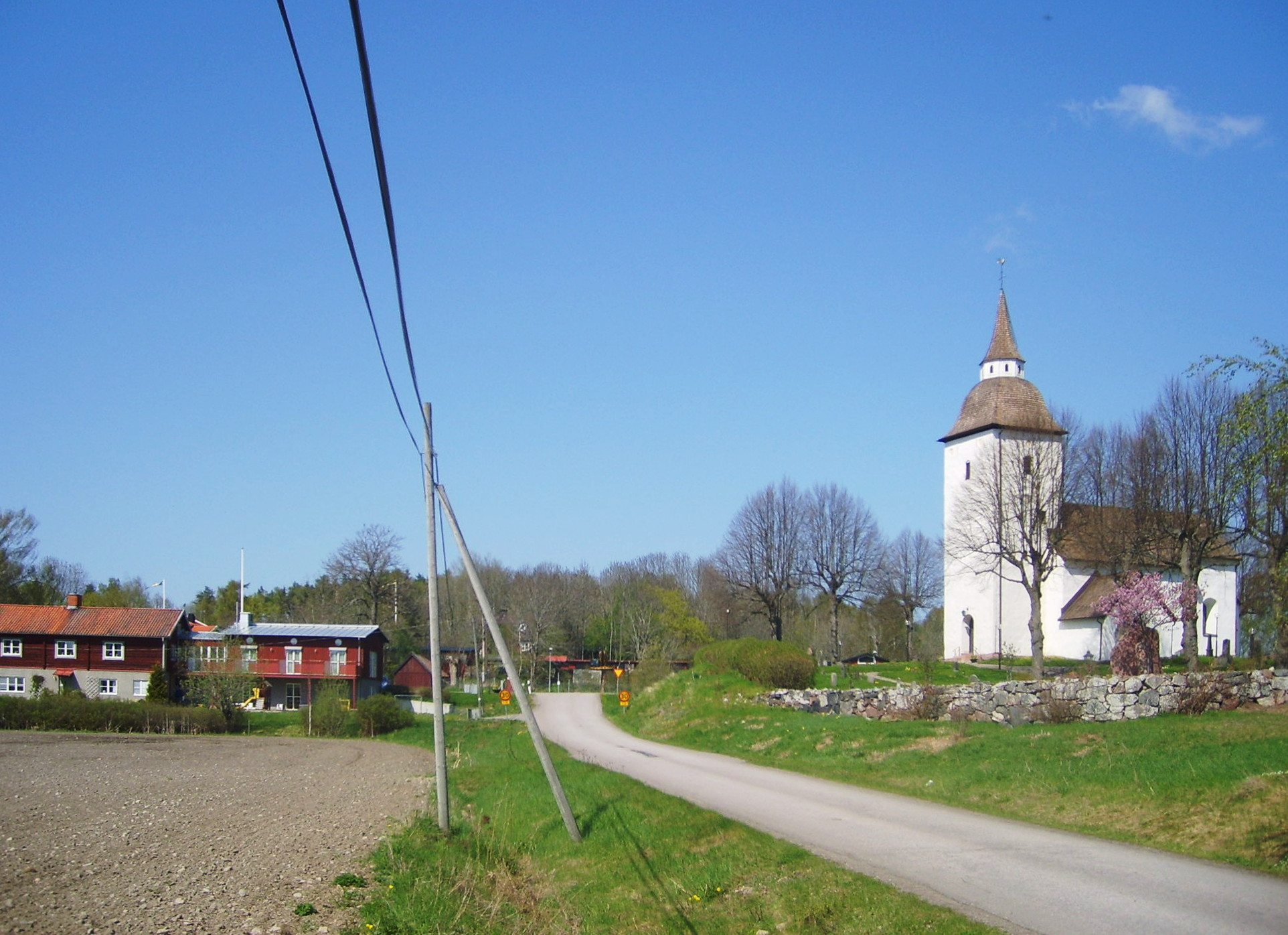
- Panorama of Tuna with a church (Ytterenhörna kyrka)

- Location within Stockholm Location within Sweden Location within European Union
- Coordinates: 59°15′N 17°29′E
- Country: Sweden
- Province: Södermanland
- County: Stockholm County
- Municipality: Södertälje Municipality

Area
  - Total: 0.35 km^{2} (0.14 sq mi)

Population (31 December 2010)
  - Total: 232
  - Density: 671/km^{2} (1,740/sq mi)
- Time zone: UTC+1 (CET)
  - Summer (DST): UTC+2 (CEST)

Tuna is a locality situated in Södertälje Municipality, Stockholm County, Sweden with 232 inhabitants in 2010.
