= Lugnet =

Lugnet may refer to:

- A part of Lugnet och Skälsmara, a locality in Värmdö Municipality, Sweden
- Lugnet, Malmö, a neighbourhood of Malmö Municipality, Sweden
- Lugnet, Falun, a sports complex in Falun, Sweden
- LUGNET, a Lego-oriented online community
