= Östra Kallfors =

- Location within Stockholm Location within Sweden Location within European Union
- Coordinates: 59°06′40″N 17°33′30″E
- Country: Sweden
- Province: Södermanland
- County: Stockholm County
- Municipality: Södertälje Municipality

Area
  - Total: 0.35 km^{2} (0.14 sq mi)

Population (31 December 2010)
  - Total: 386
  - Density: 1,119/km^{2} (2,900/sq mi)
- Time zone: UTC+1 (CET)
  - Summer (DST): UTC+2 (CEST)

Östra Kallfors is a locality situated in Södertälje Municipality, Stockholm County, Sweden with 386 inhabitants in 2010.
