= Viksäter =

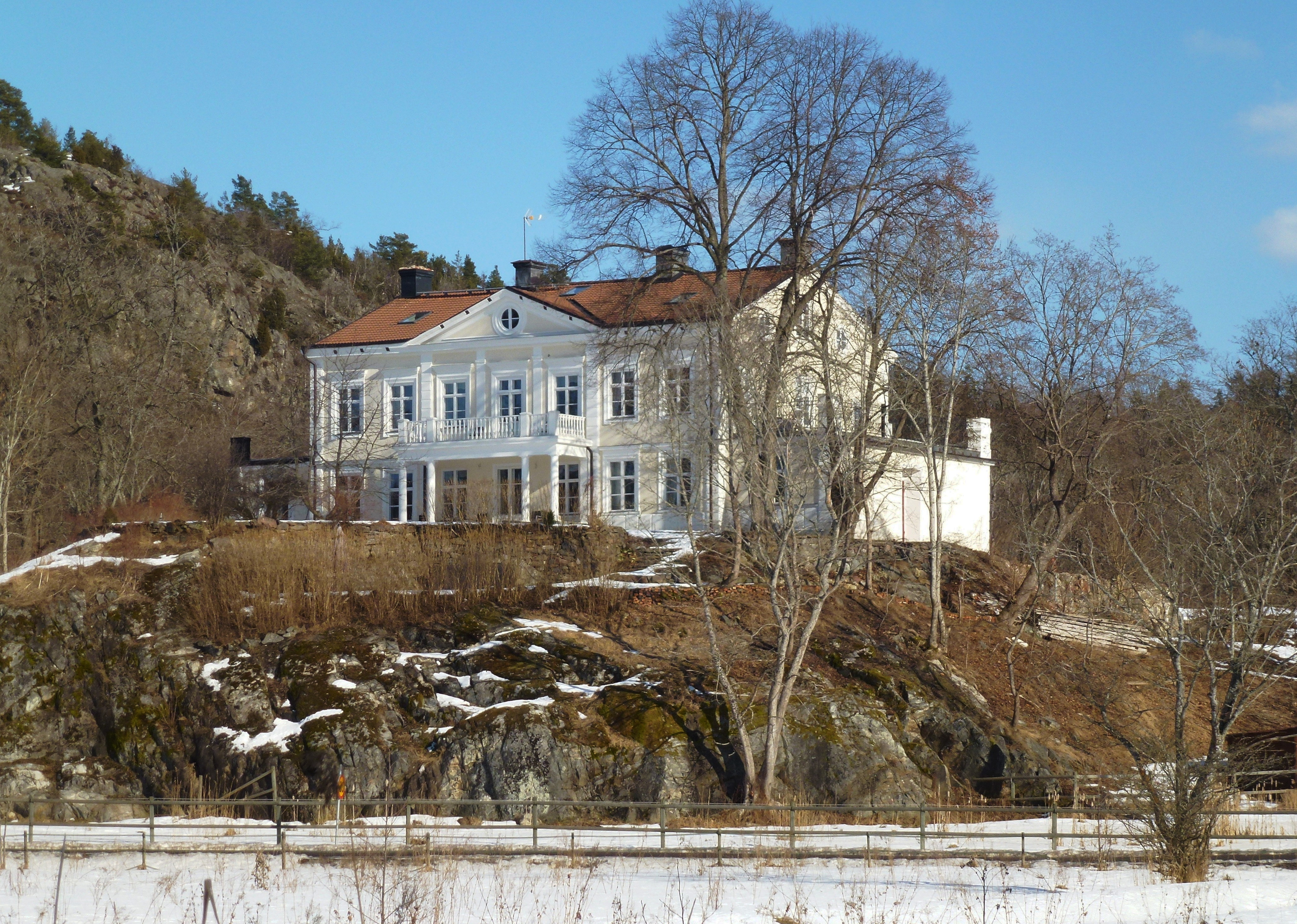
- Viksäter in 2013

- Location within Stockholm Location within Sweden Location within European Union
- Coordinates: 59°14′N 17°36′E
- Country: Sweden
- Province: Södermanland
- County: Stockholm County
- Municipality: Södertälje Municipality

Area
  - Total: 0.63 km^{2} (0.24 sq mi)

Population (31 December 2010)
  - Total: 459
  - Density: 727/km^{2} (1,880/sq mi)
- Time zone: UTC+1 (CET)
  - Summer (DST): UTC+2 (CEST)

Viksäter is a locality situated in Södertälje Municipality, Stockholm County, Sweden with 459 inhabitants in 2010.
