= Steningehöjden =

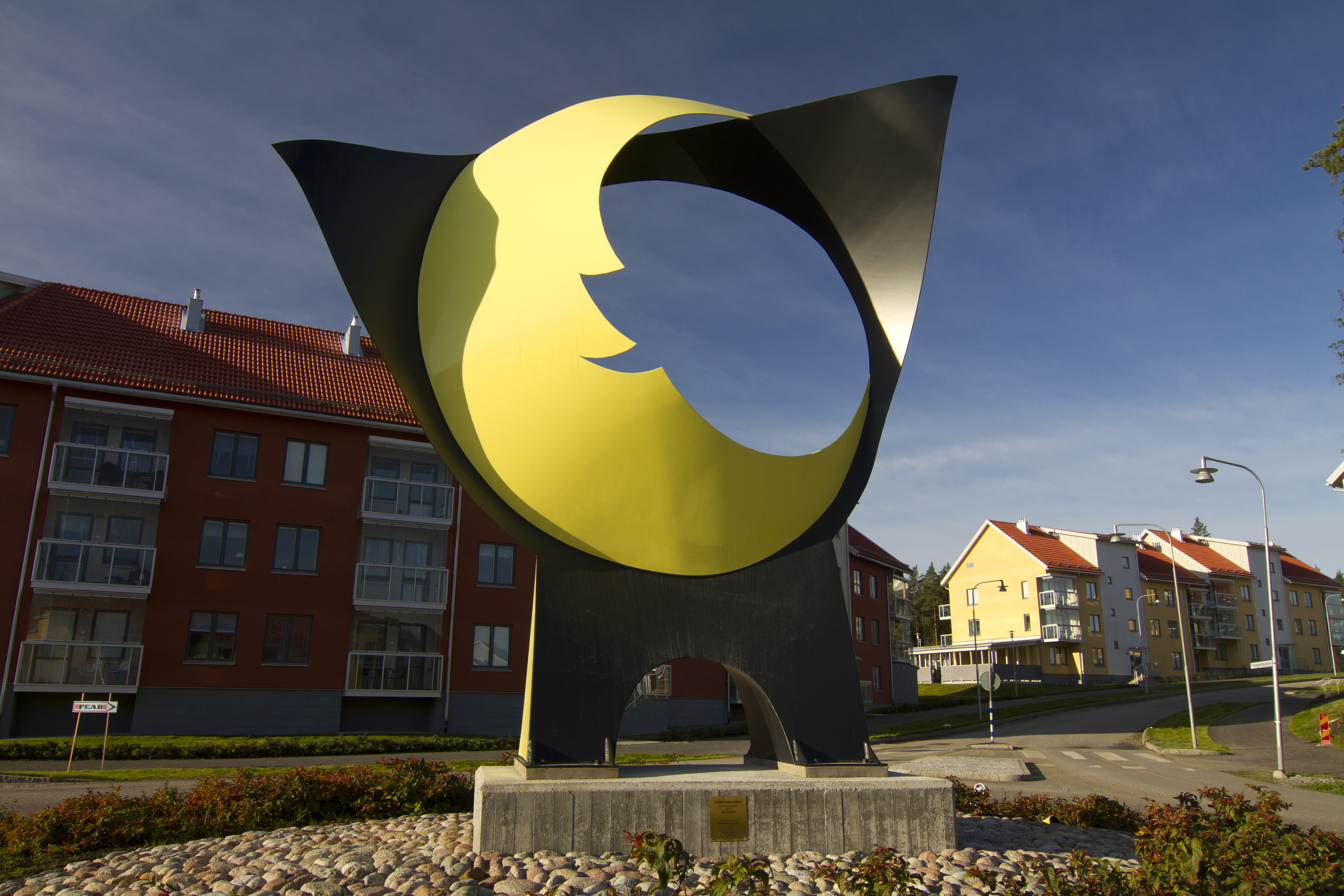

- Location within Stockholm Location within Sweden Location within European Union
- Coordinates: 59°37′22″N 17°48′3″E
- Country: Sweden
- Province: Uppland
- County: Stockholm County
- Municipality: Sigtuna Municipality

Area
  - Total: 0.47 km^{2} (0.18 sq mi)

Population (2020)
  - Total: 1,482
- Time zone: UTC+1 (CET)
  - Summer (DST): UTC+2 (CEST)

Steningehöjden is a locality situated in Sigtuna Municipality, Stockholm County, Sweden. It is located north of Steninge Palace and west of Märsta in Odensala parish. Since 2015, Statistics Sweden has demarcated an urban area for this settlement and the one north of Ölsta, named Ölsta och Steningehöjden.
