= Granby, Sigtuna =

Granby
- Location within Stockholm Location within Sweden Location within European Union
- Coordinates: 59°39′25″N 17°37′49″E
- Country: Sweden
- Province: Uppland
- County: Stockholm County
- Municipality: Sigtuna Municipality

Area
  - Total: 0.52 km^{2} (0.20 sq mi)

Population (2020)
  - Total: 299
- Time zone: UTC+1 (CET)
  - Summer (DST): UTC+2 (CEST)

Granby is a locality situated in Sigtuna Municipality, Stockholm County, Sweden. Since 2015, Statistics Sweden has demarcated an urban area for this settlement.
