= Ekeby, Södertälje =

Ekeby
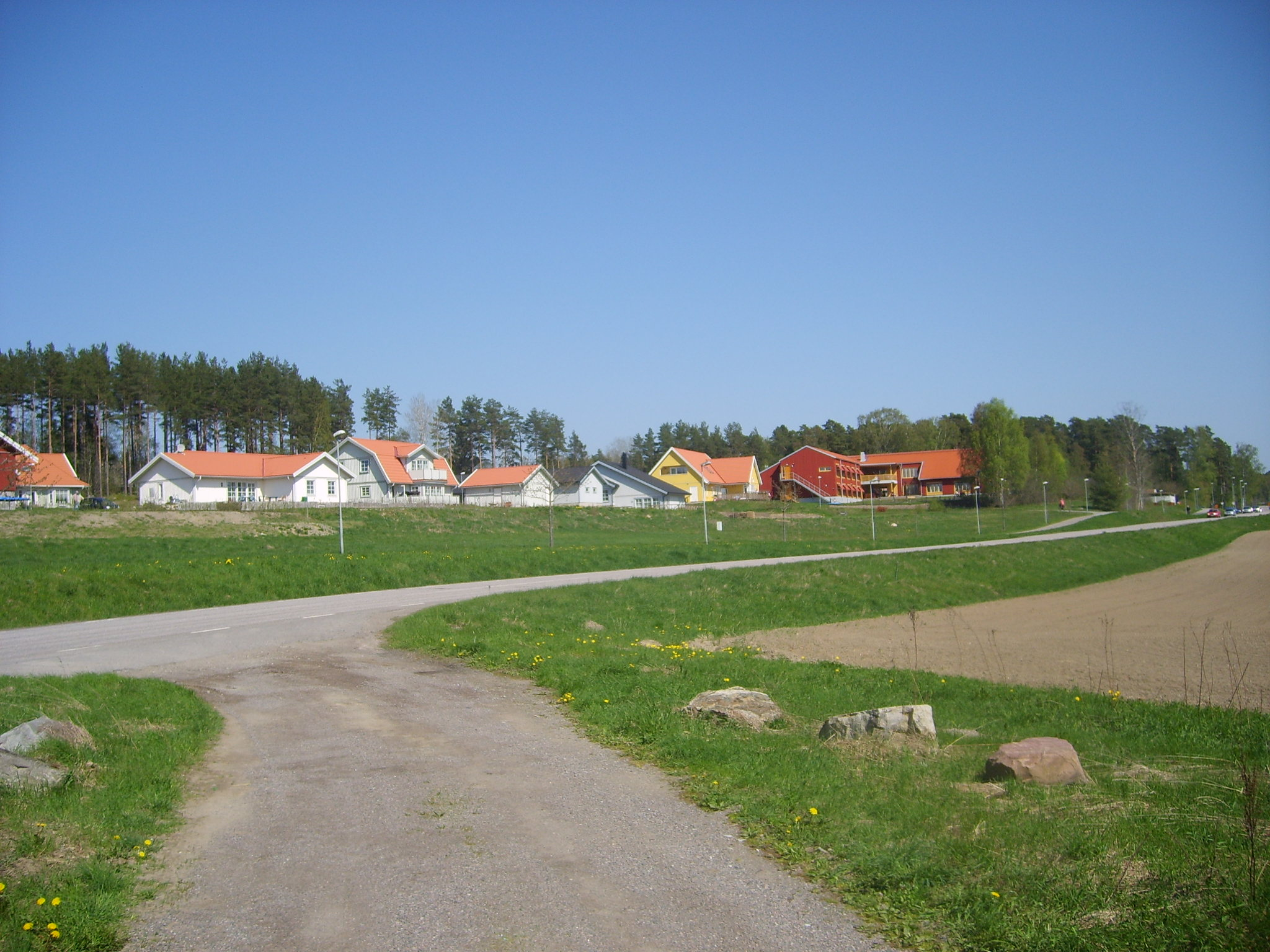
- Ekeby

- Location in Södertälje Municipality in Stockholm County Ekeby (Sweden) Ekeby (European Union)
- Coordinates: 59°11′N 17°38′E
- Country: Sweden
- Province: Södermanland
- County: Stockholm County
- Municipality: Södertälje Municipality

Area
  - Total: 0.58 km^{2} (0.22 sq mi)

Population (31 December 2020)
  - Total: 1,000
  - Density: 1,700/km^{2} (4,500/sq mi)
- Time zone: UTC+1 (CET)
  - Summer (DST): UTC+2 (CEST)

Ekeby is a locality situated in Södertälje Municipality, Stockholm County, Sweden with 1,018 inhabitants in 2010.
