= Sandviken, Södertälje =

Sandviken
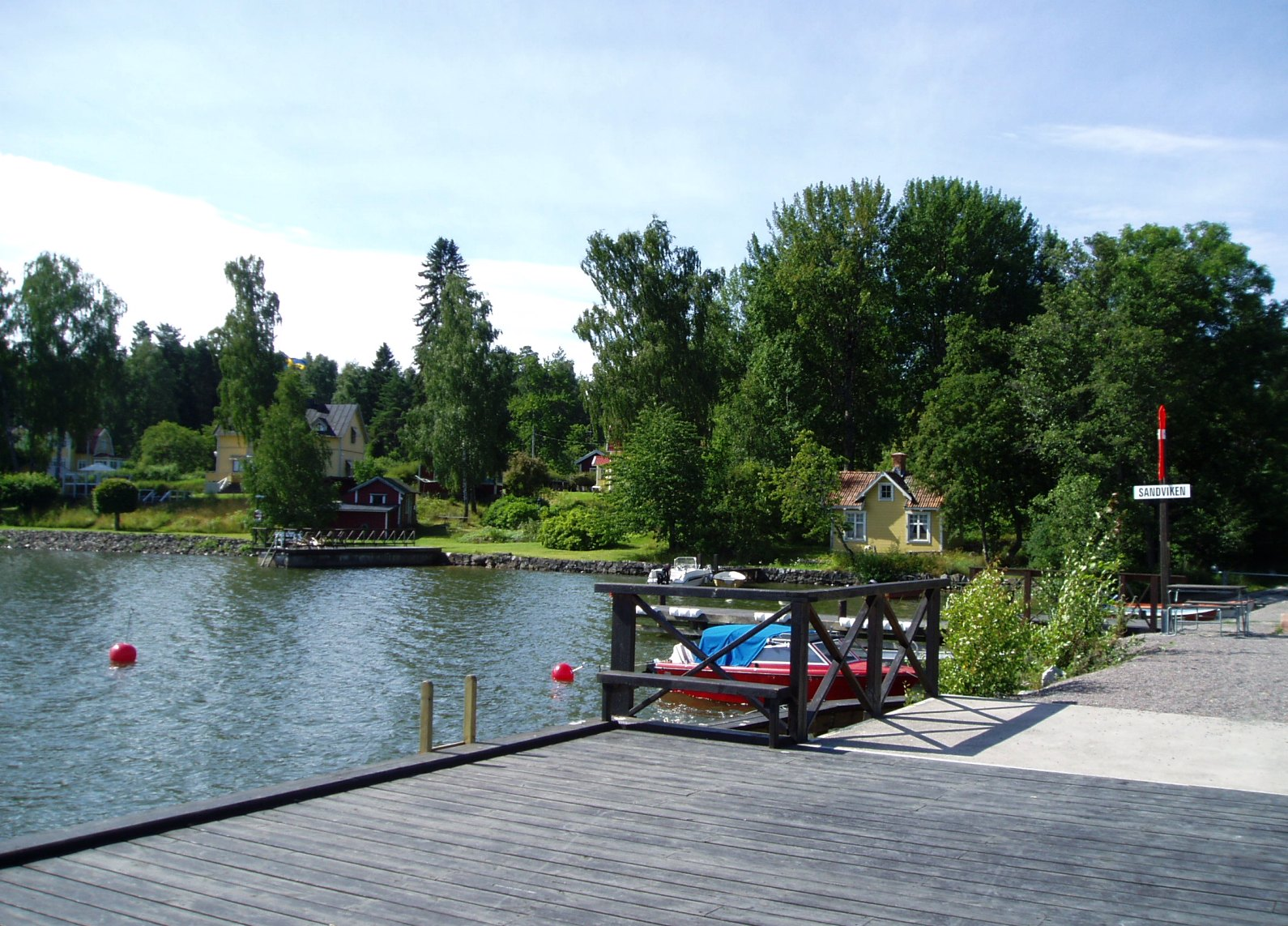
- Sandviken, Södertälje kommun

- Location within Stockholm Location within Sweden Location within European Union
- Coordinates: 59°11′N 17°38′E
- Country: Sweden
- Province: Södermanland
- County: Stockholm County
- Municipality: Södertälje Municipality

Area
  - Total: 0.72 km^{2} (0.28 sq mi)

Population (31 December 2010)
  - Total: 338
  - Density: 472/km^{2} (1,220/sq mi)
- Time zone: UTC+1 (CET)
  - Summer (DST): UTC+2 (CEST)

Sandviken is a locality situated in Södertälje Municipality, Stockholm County, Sweden with 338 inhabitants in 2010.
