= Pershagen =

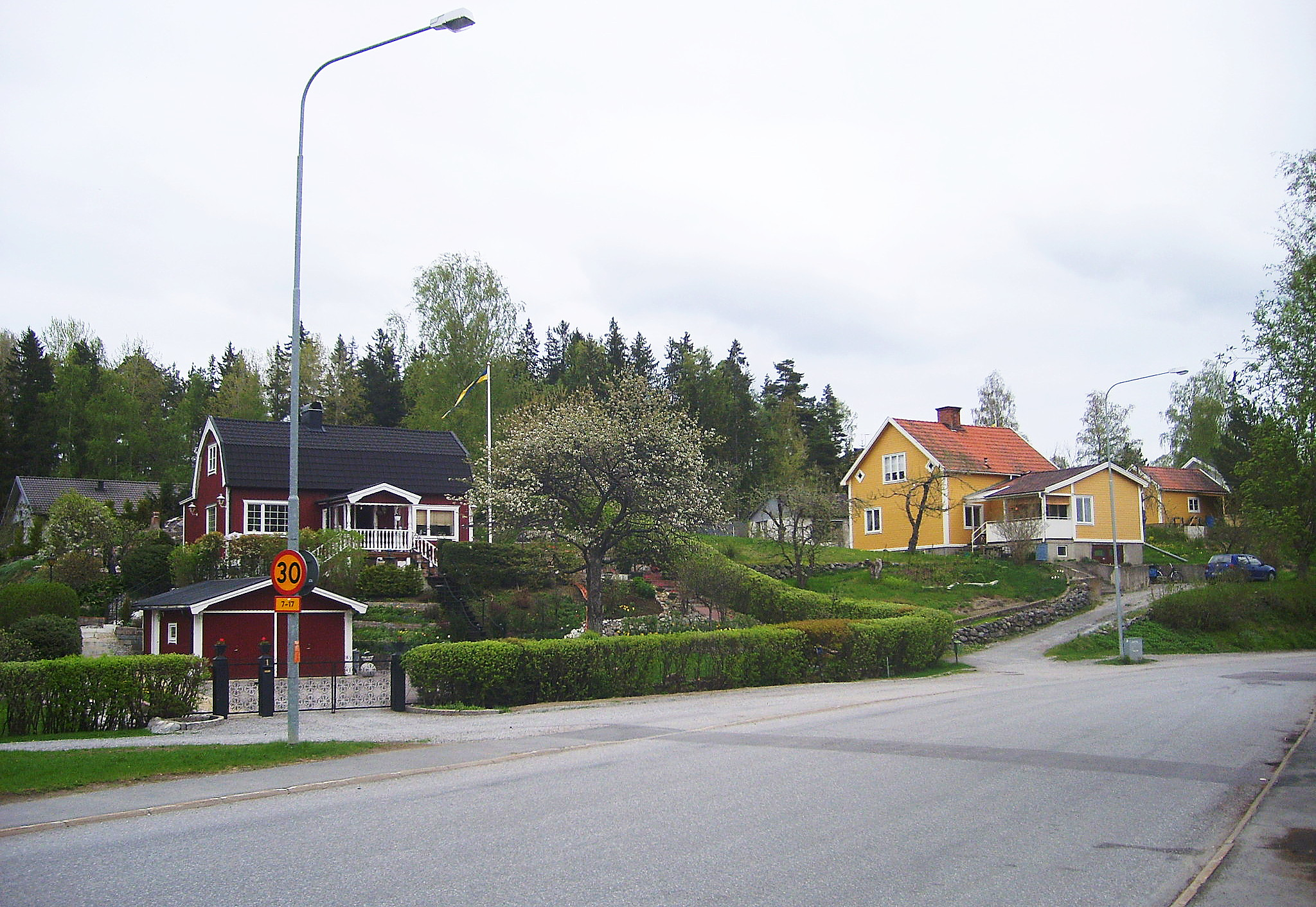
- Pershagen

- Location within Stockholm Location within Sweden Location within European Union
- Coordinates: 59°10′N 17°39′E
- Country: Sweden
- Province: Södermanland
- County: Stockholm County
- Municipality: Södertälje Municipality

Area
  - Total: 0.93 km^{2} (0.36 sq mi)

Population (31 December 2020)
  - Total: 2,200
  - Density: 2,400/km^{2} (6,100/sq mi)
- Time zone: UTC+1 (CET)
  - Summer (DST): UTC+2 (CEST)

Pershagen is a locality situated in Södertälje Municipality, Stockholm County, Sweden with 2,216 inhabitants in 2010.
