= Sibble =

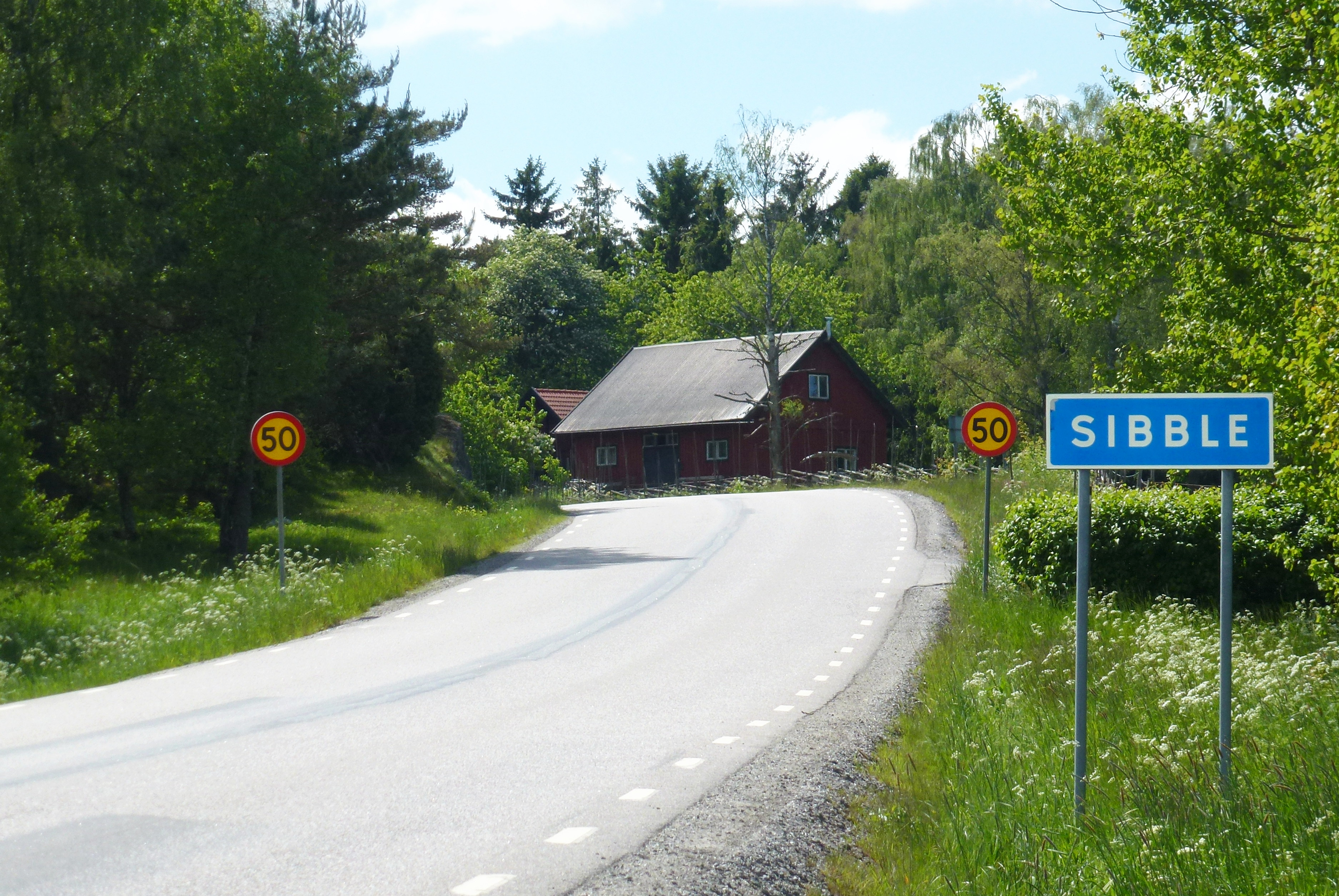
- Sibble road sign

- Location within Stockholm Location within Sweden Location within European Union
- Coordinates: 59°07′N 17°45′E
- Country: Sweden
- Province: Södermanland
- County: Stockholm County
- Municipality: Botkyrka Municipality

Area
  - Total: 0.66 km^{2} (0.25 sq mi)

Population (31 December 2020)
  - Total: 343
  - Density: 520/km^{2} (1,300/sq mi)
- Time zone: UTC+1 (CET)
  - Summer (DST): UTC+2 (CEST)

Sibble is a locality situated in Botkyrka Municipality, Stockholm County, Sweden with 309 inhabitants in 2010.
