= Östorp and Ådran =

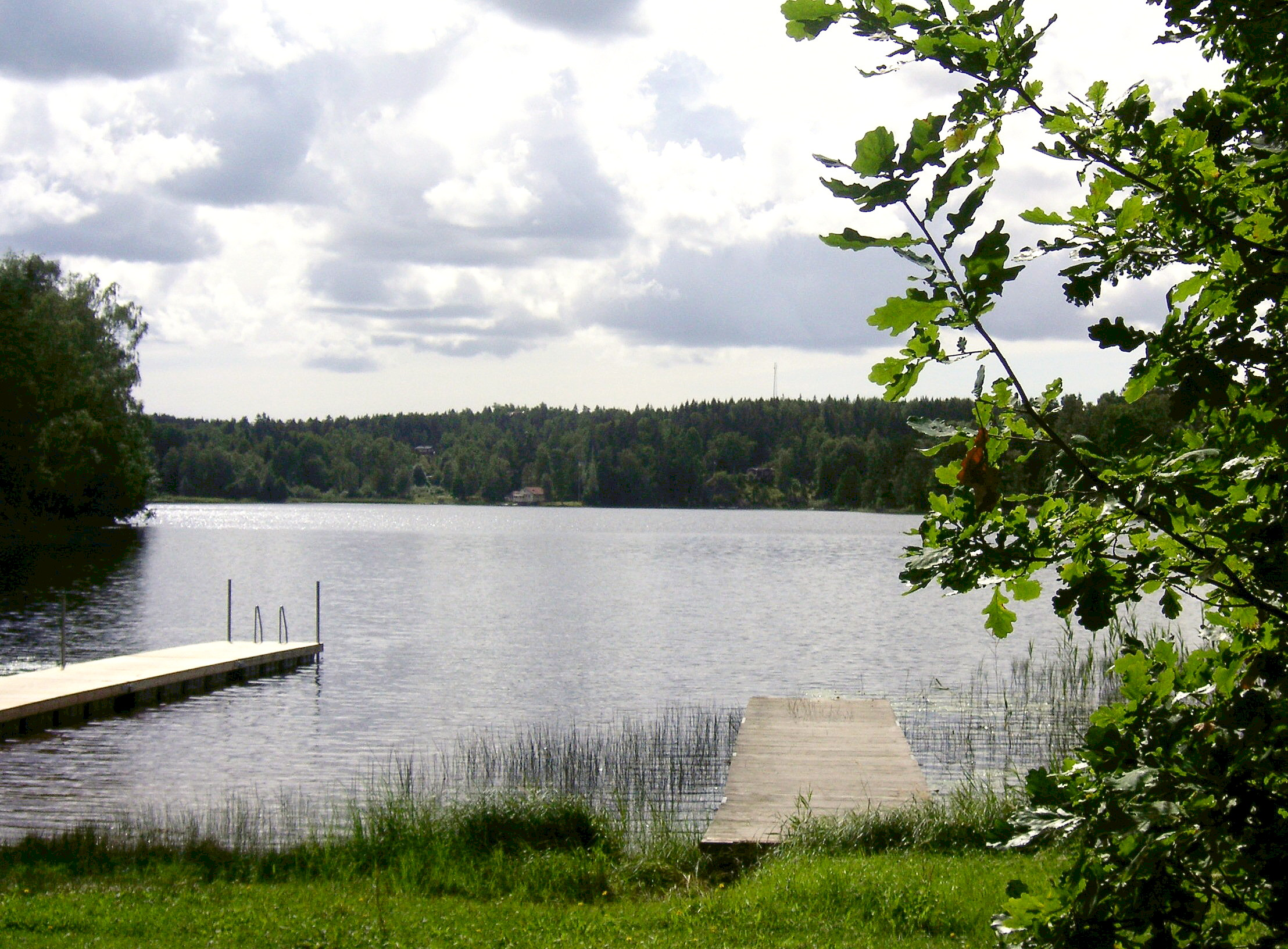

- Location within Stockholm Location within Sweden Location within European Union
- Coordinates: 59°09′30″N 18°00′40″E
- Country: Sweden
- Province: Södermanland
- County: Stockholm County
- Municipality: Haninge Municipality and Huddinge Municipality

Area
  - Total: 1.08 km^{2} (0.42 sq mi)

Population (31 December 2023)
  - Total: 247
  - Density: 229/km^{2} (590/sq mi)
- Time zone: UTC+1 (CET)
  - Summer (DST): UTC+2 (CEST)

Östorp and Ådran (sometimes Ådran and Östorp) (Östorp och Ådran) is a bimunicipal locality situated in Haninge Municipality and Huddinge Municipality in Stockholm County, Sweden with 247 inhabitants in 2023.
