= Rättarboda =

- Location within Stockholm Location within Sweden Location within European Union
- Coordinates: 59°30′N 17°36′E
- Country: Sweden
- Province: Uppland
- County: Stockholm County
- Municipality: Upplands-Bro Municipality

Area
  - Total: 0.36 km^{2} (0.14 sq mi)

Population (31 December 2020)
  - Total: 589
  - Density: 1,600/km^{2} (4,200/sq mi)
- Time zone: UTC+1 (CET)
  - Summer (DST): UTC+2 (CEST)

Rättarboda is a locality situated in Upplands-Bro Municipality, Stockholm County, Sweden with 237 inhabitants in 2010.
