= Norra Riksten =

- Location within Stockholm Location within Sweden Location within European Union
- Coordinates: 59°11′14″N 17°54′46″E
- Country: Sweden
- Province: Södermanland
- County: Stockholm County
- Municipality: Botkyrka Municipality

Area
  - Total: 0.39 km^{2} (0.15 sq mi)

Population (31 December 2010)
  - Total: 839
  - Density: 2,137/km^{2} (5,530/sq mi)
- Time zone: UTC+1 (CET)
  - Summer (DST): UTC+2 (CEST)

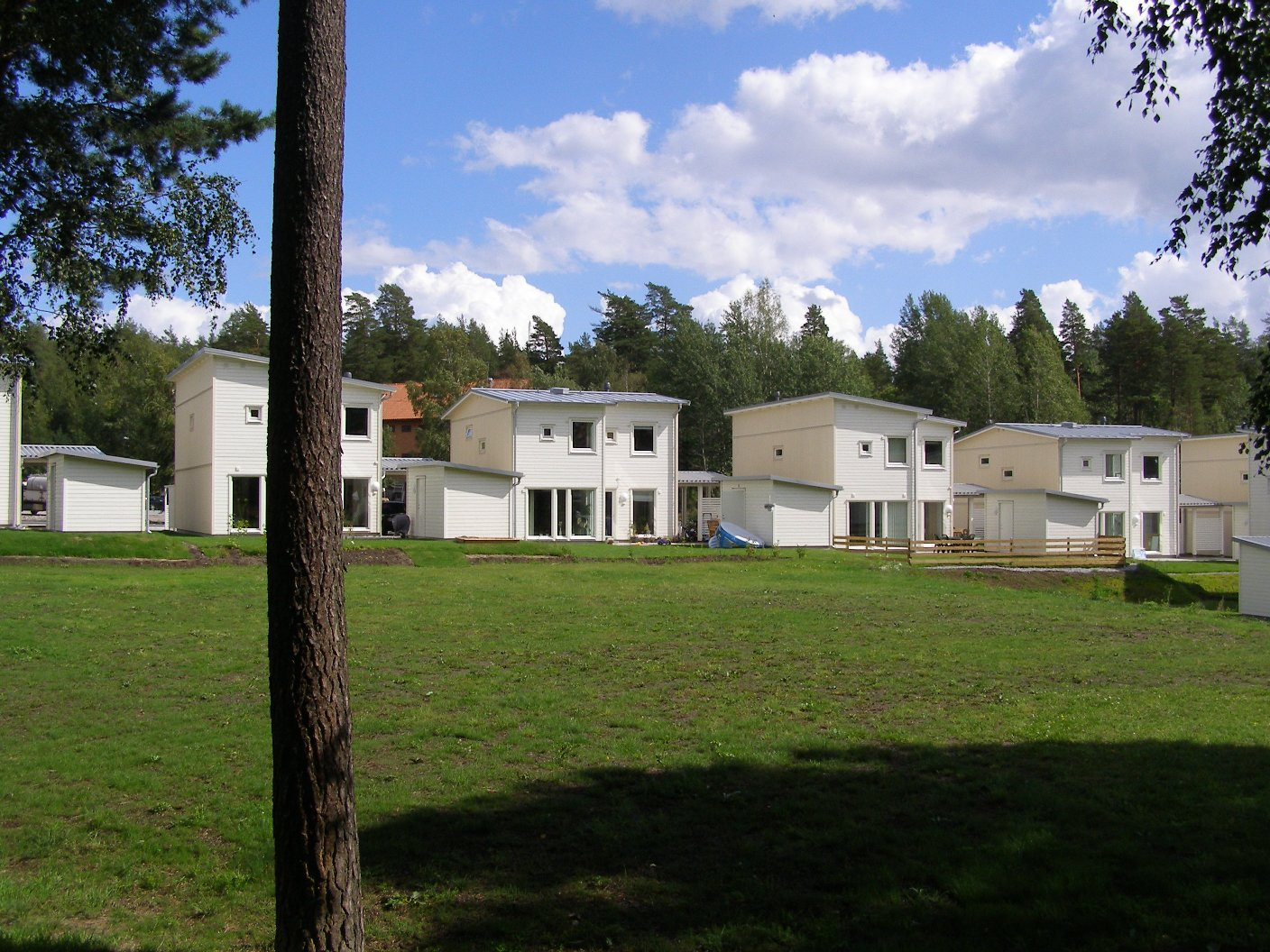

Norra Riksten (also Riksten or Riksten friluftsstad) is a locality situated in Botkyrka Municipality, Stockholm County, Sweden with 839 inhabitants in 2010.
