= Lidatorp and Klövsta =

- Location within Stockholm Location within Sweden Location within European Union
- Coordinates: 58°57′30″N 17°54′20″E
- Country: Sweden
- Province: Södermanland
- County: Stockholm County
- Municipality: Nynäshamn Municipality

Area
  - Total: 0.34 km^{2} (0.13 sq mi)

Population (31 December 2010)
  - Total: 340
  - Density: 992/km^{2} (2,570/sq mi)
- Time zone: UTC+1 (CET)
  - Summer (DST): UTC+2 (CEST)

Lidatorp and Klövsta (Lidatorp och Klövsta) is a locality situated in Nynäshamn Municipality, Stockholm County, Sweden with 340 inhabitants in 2010.
