= Ängsvik =

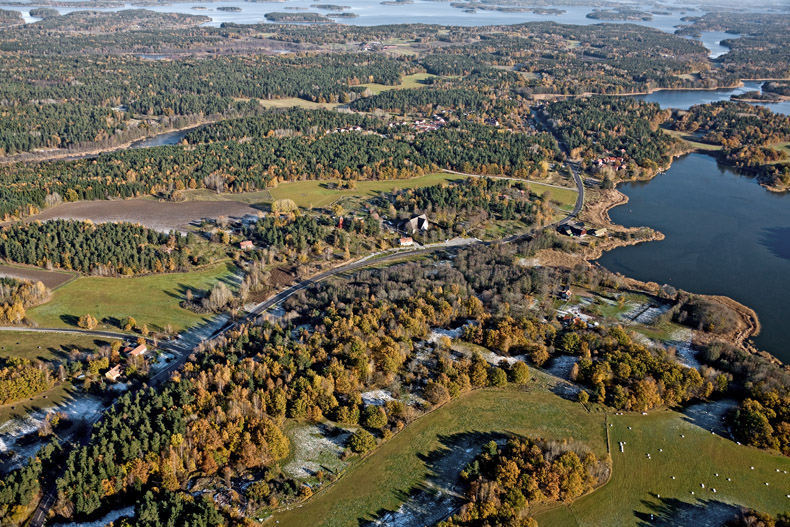
- Ängsvik, Värmdö Municipality, Stockholm County, Sweden

- Location within Stockholm Location within Sweden Location within European Union
- Coordinates: 59°21′N 18°31′E
- Country: Sweden
- Province: Uppland
- County: Stockholm County
- Municipality: Värmdö Municipality

Area
  - Total: 0.19 km^{2} (0.073 sq mi)

Population (31 December 2020)
  - Total: 441
  - Density: 2,300/km^{2} (6,000/sq mi)
- Time zone: UTC+1 (CET)
  - Summer (DST): UTC+2 (CEST)

Ängsvik is a locality situated in Värmdö Municipality, Stockholm County, Sweden with 403 inhabitants in 2010.
