= Kopparmora =

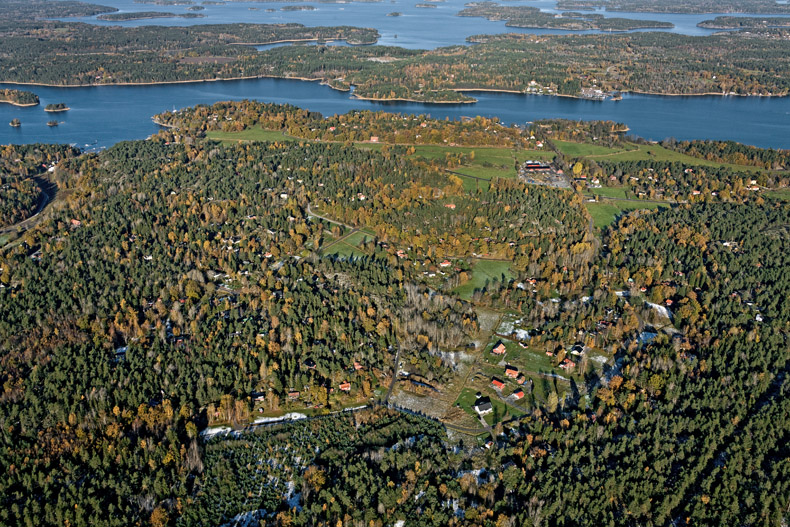
- Kopparmora

- Location within Stockholm Location within Sweden Location within European Union
- Coordinates: 59°20′N 18°35′E
- Country: Sweden
- Province: Uppland
- County: Stockholm County
- Municipality: Värmdö Municipality

Area
  - Total: 0.82 km^{2} (0.32 sq mi)

Population (31 December 2020)
  - Total: 2,302
  - Density: 2,800/km^{2} (7,300/sq mi)
- Time zone: UTC+1 (CET)
  - Summer (DST): UTC+2 (CEST)

Kopparmora is a locality situated in Värmdö Municipality, Stockholm County, Sweden with 631 inhabitants in 2010.
