= Strålsjön =

Lake in Nacka Municipality, Sweden

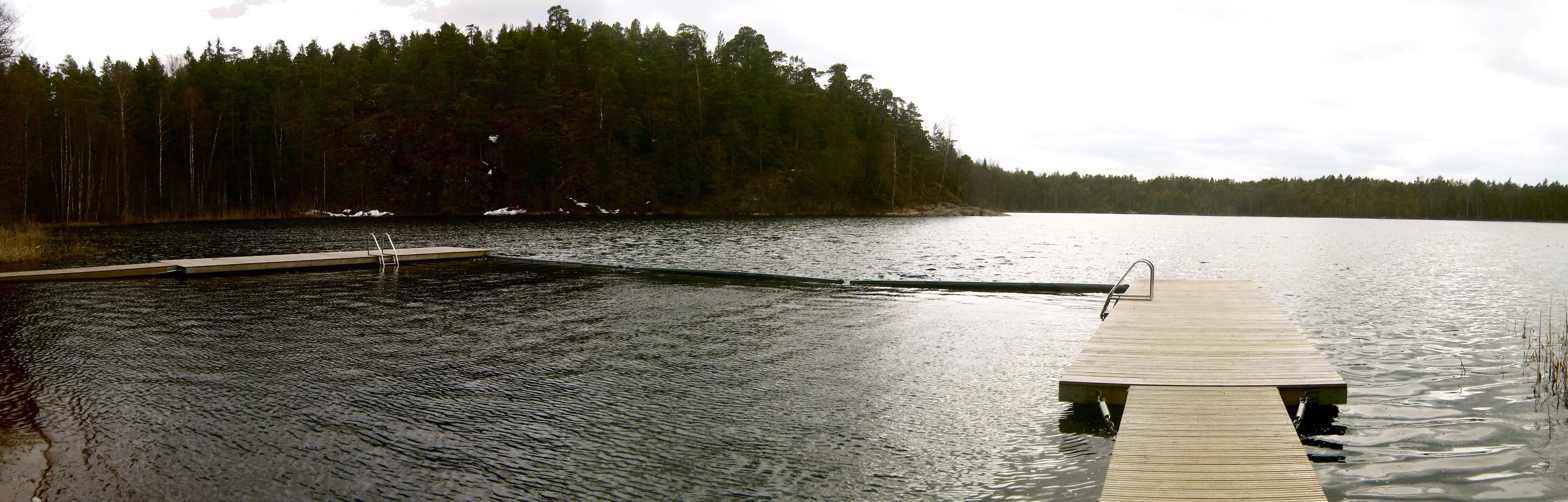
- A jetty on Strålsjön Lake

- Location within Stockholm
- Coordinates: 59°16′02″N 18°11′48″E
- Basin countries: Sweden

Strålsjön is a lake in Stockholm County, Södermanland, Sweden.
