= Tullan =

Lake in Södertälje Municipality, Sweden

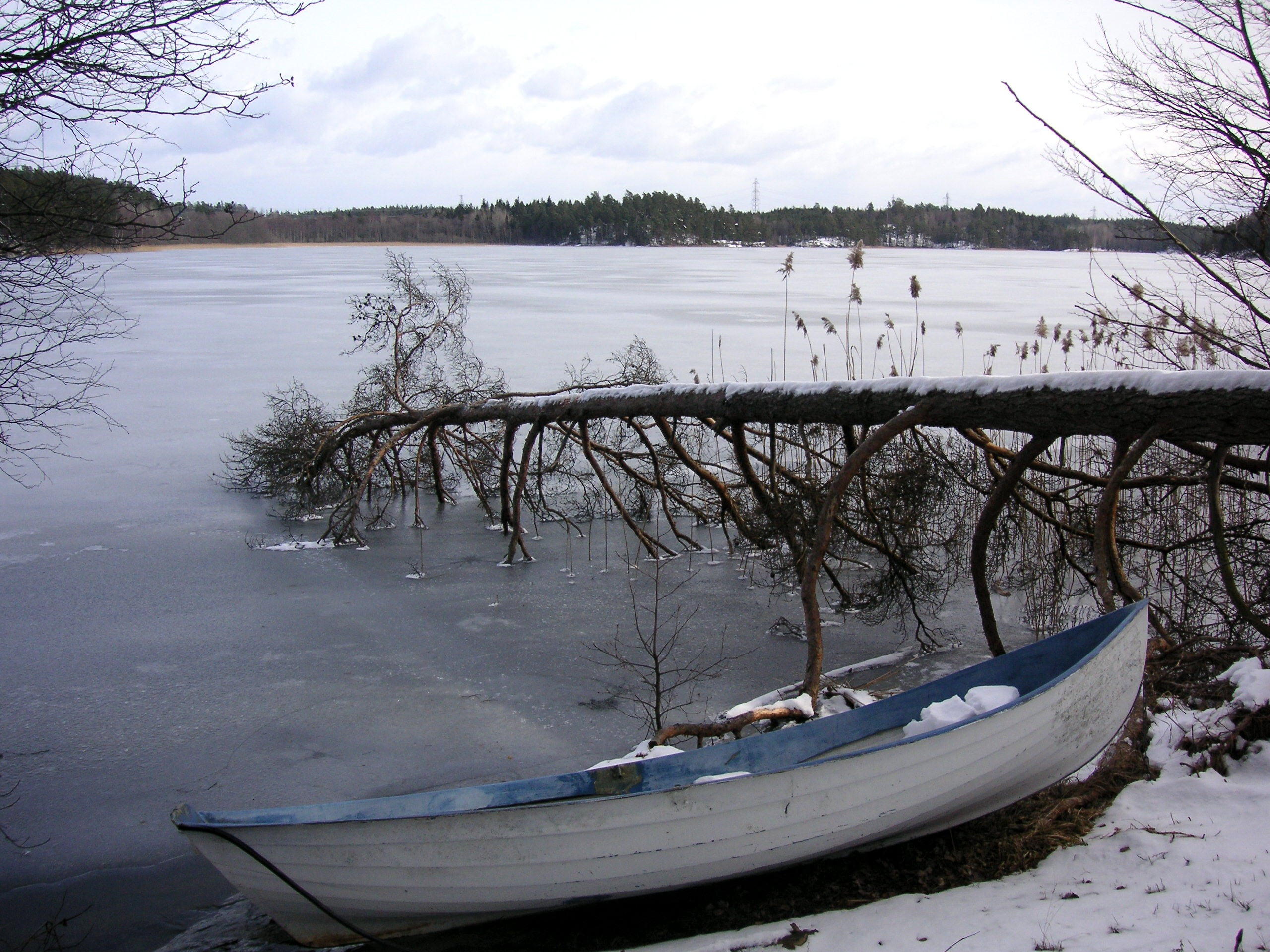

- Location within Stockholm
- Coordinates: 59°13′N 17°41′E
- Basin countries: Sweden

Tullan is a lake in Stockholm County, Södermanland, Sweden, which is part of the Norrström main drainage basin. The lake is 11 meters deep, has an area of 0.685 square kilometers and is 19.1 meters above sea level. Tullan is part of Bornsjöns Nature Reserve and Stockholm Vatten's Bornsjöegendomarna.

== Generally ==
South of Tullan runs the E20 motorway and north of the lake stretches the old Södertäljevägen (once the Old Göta Highway ). A milestone with the text "3 MIL FROM STOCKHOLM" is a reminder of this, which is located near the Hagen farmstead, where a small piece of the old highway has been preserved. The milestone was erected in the 1750s by the county governor Theodor Ankarcrona and renovated in 2004 by the Salems Hembygdförening.

A species of crown algae, strefse, is found in Tullan, which indicates high water quality. The runoff goes to Bornsjön, which is a reserve water source for Stockholm. Tullan is part of the Bornsjön water protection area.

The surroundings consist of hilly coniferous forest with elements of rocky ground and some cultivated land. Around the outlet there are areas of deciduous swamp forest. Smaller marshes occur in the area, such as at Getasjön on the southern side and at Loringe in the north. On the slopes next to the lake there are large stands of very old spruce and pine. At Tullan, among other things, the less common bird species osprey and great crested grebe nest.
