= Segersjön =

Lake in Stockholm County, Södermanland, Sweden

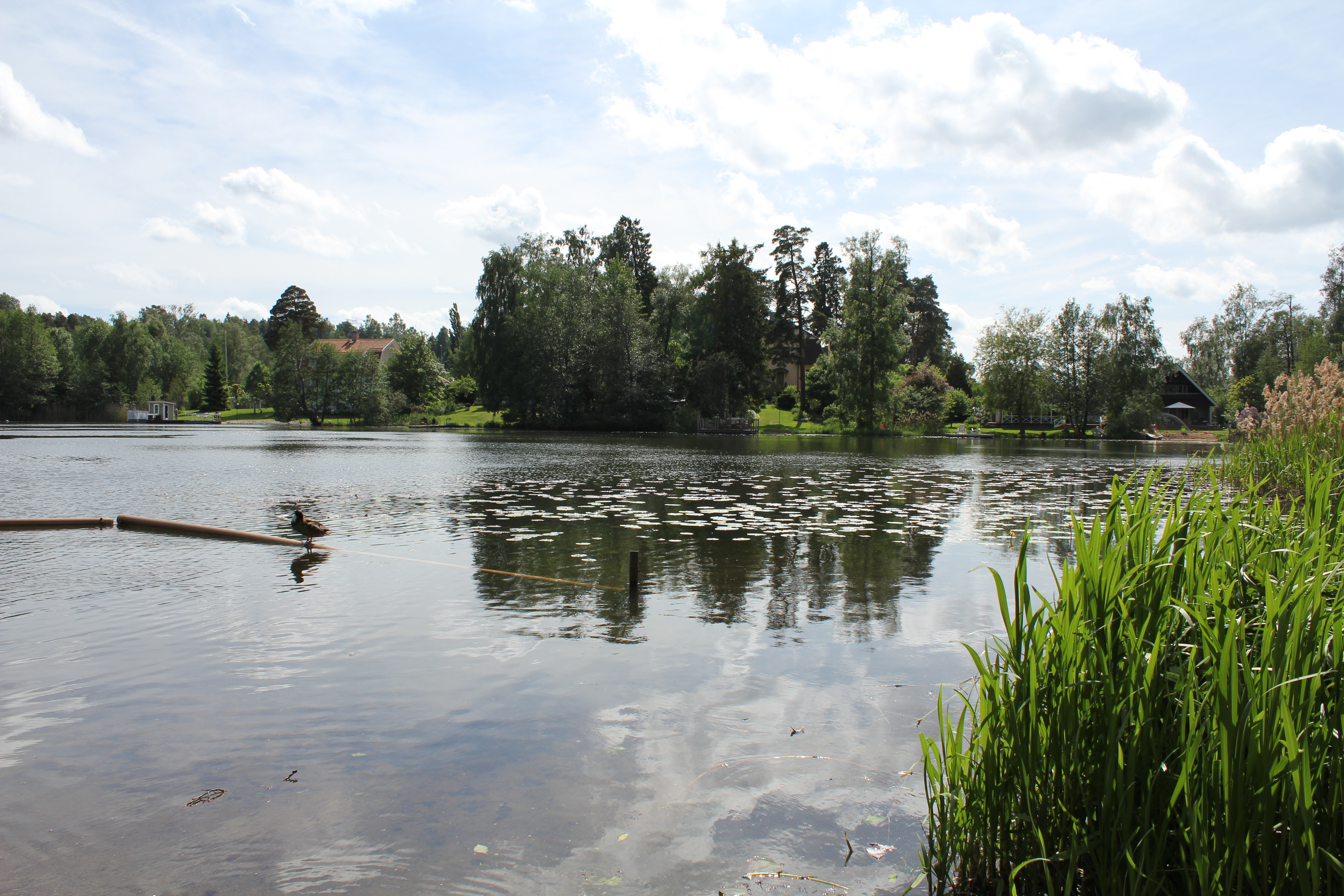

- Location within Stockholm
- Coordinates: 59°11′45″N 17°48′18″E
- Basin countries: Sweden

Segersjön is a small lake in Stockholm County, Södermanland, Sweden. It is northeast of Lake Uttran.
