= Bammarboda =

- Location within Stockholm Location within Sweden Location within European Union
- Coordinates: 59°30′27″N 18°27′54″E
- Country: Sweden
- Province: Uppland
- County: Stockholm County
- Municipality: Österåker Municipality

Area
  - Total: 0.79 km^{2} (0.31 sq mi)

Population (31 December 2020)
  - Total: 671
  - Density: 850/km^{2} (2,200/sq mi)
- Time zone: UTC+1 (CET)
  - Summer (DST): UTC+2 (CEST)

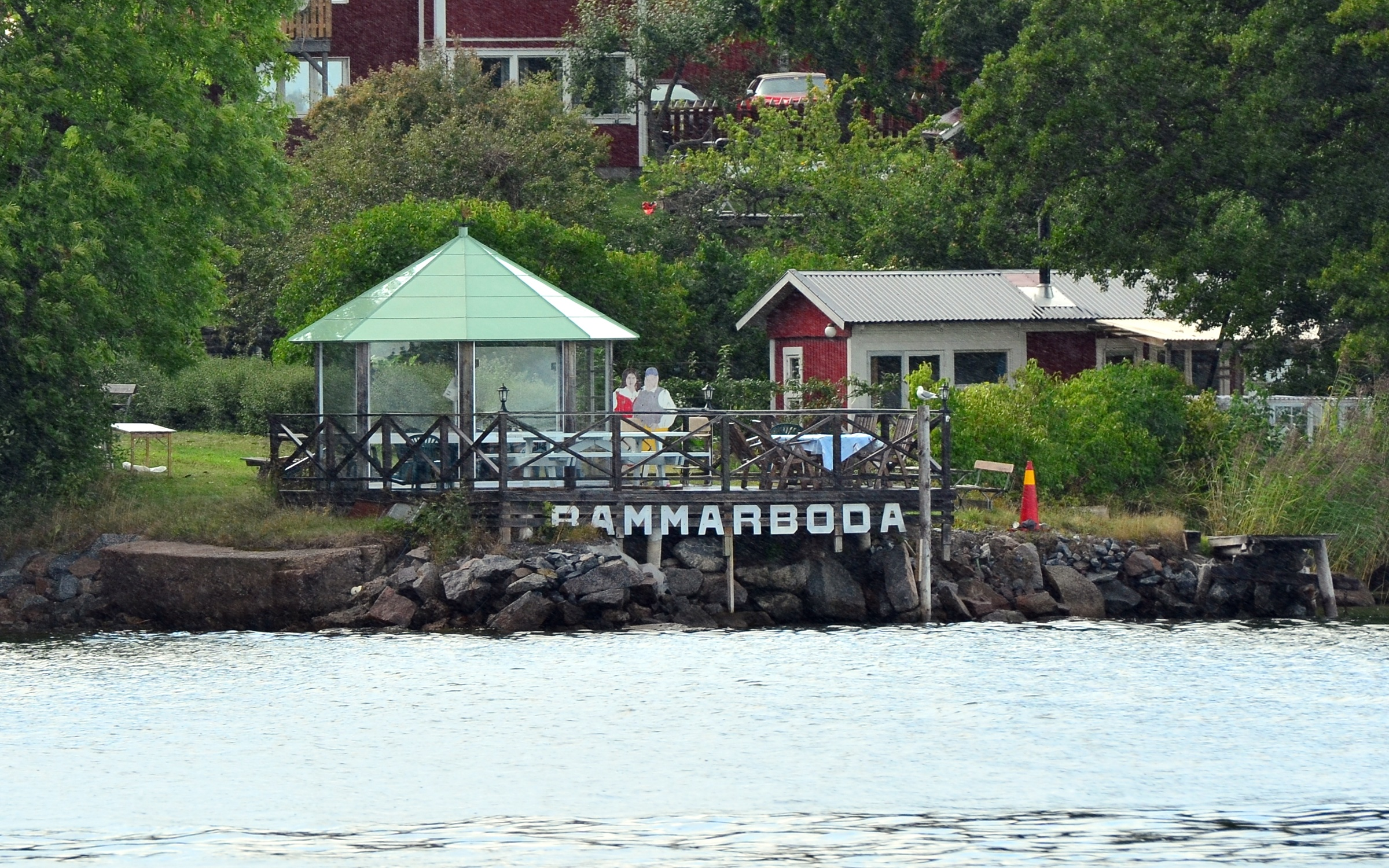
A jetty in Bammarboda, Österåker

Bammarboda is a locality situated in Österåker Municipality, Stockholm County, Sweden with 249 inhabitants in 2010.
