= Karptjärn =

Lake in Sweden

- Location within Stockholm
- Location: Tyresö Municipality
- Coordinates: 59°14.80′N 18°17.12′E
- Basin countries: Sweden

Karptjärn is a lake in Stockholm County, Södermanland, Sweden.
