= Gladö kvarn =

- Location within Stockholm Location within Sweden Location within European Union
- Coordinates: 59°11′N 17°59′E
- Country: Sweden
- Province: Södermanland
- County: Stockholm County
- Municipality: Huddinge Municipality

Area
  - Total: 1.10 km^{2} (0.42 sq mi)

Population (31 December 2020)
  - Total: 772
- Time zone: UTC+1 (CET)
  - Summer (DST): UTC+2 (CEST)

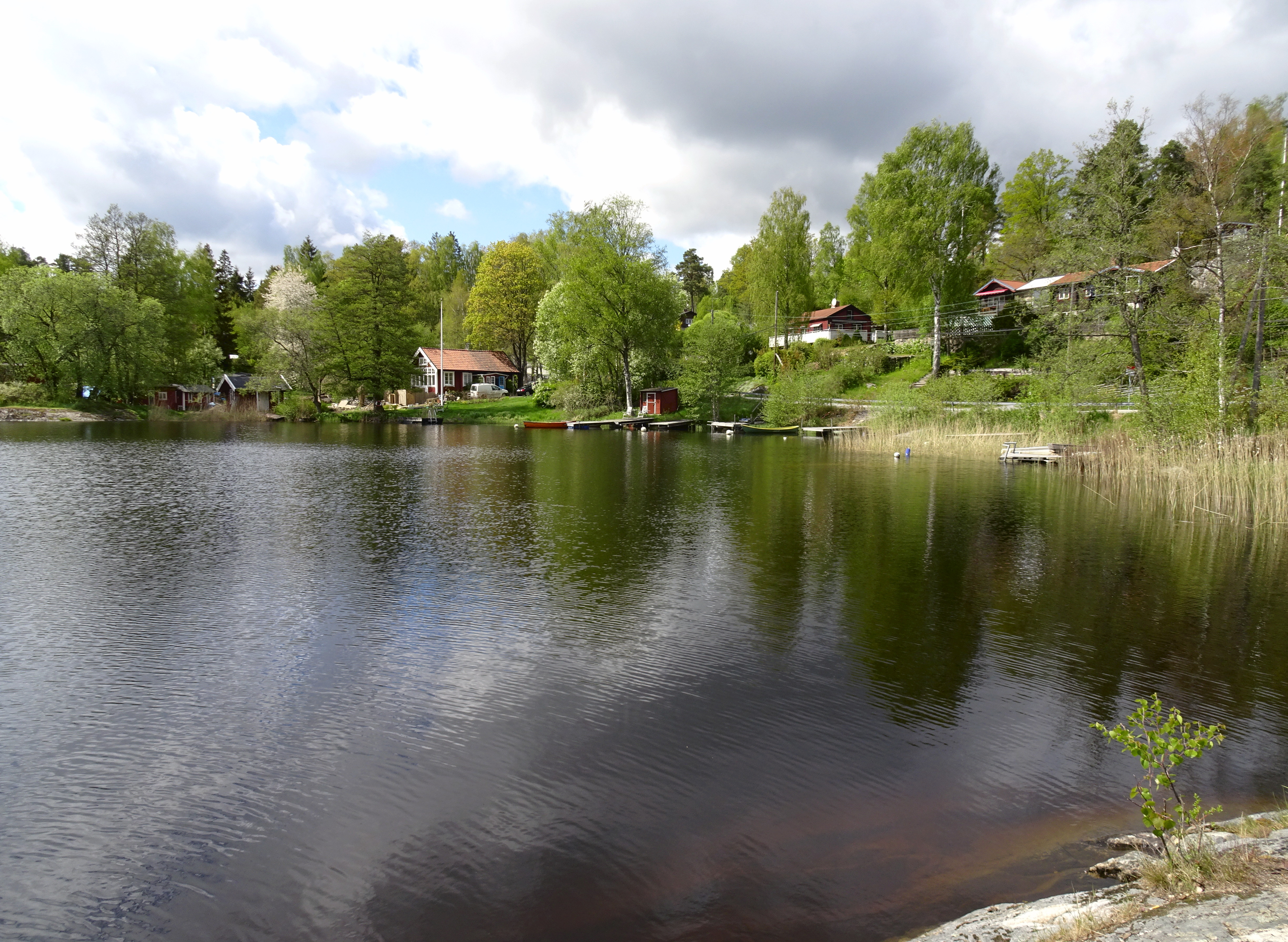
Gladö kvarn

Gladö kvarn is a locality situated in Huddinge Municipality, Stockholm County, Sweden with 539 inhabitants in 2010. Gladö kvarn has 442 real estates. 269 of these real estates are permanently inhabited, 158 are leisure homes and 15 of them are unbuilt. (Allegedly, in May 2015.)
