= Ölsta =

- Location within Stockholm Location within Sweden Location within European Union
- Coordinates: 59°24′N 17°39′E
- Country: Sweden
- Province: Uppland
- County: Stockholm County
- Municipality: Ekerö Municipality

Area
  - Total: 0.76 km^{2} (0.29 sq mi)

Population (31 December 2020)
  - Total: 730
  - Density: 960/km^{2} (2,500/sq mi)
- Time zone: UTC+1 (CET)
  - Summer (DST): UTC+2 (CEST)

Ölsta (Swedish pronunciation: [ˈø̂ːlsta]) is a locality situated in Ekerö Municipality, Stockholm County, Sweden with 267 inhabitants in 2010.
