= Älvnäs =

Locality in Sweden

- Location within Stockholm Location within Sweden Location within European Union
- Coordinates: 59°17′N 17°46′E
- Country: Sweden
- Province: Uppland
- County: Stockholm County
- Municipality: Ekerö Municipality

Area
  - Total: 0.54 km^{2} (0.21 sq mi)

Population (31 December 2020)
  - Total: 802
  - Density: 1,500/km^{2} (3,800/sq mi)
- Time zone: UTC+1 (CET)
  - Summer (DST): UTC+2 (CEST)

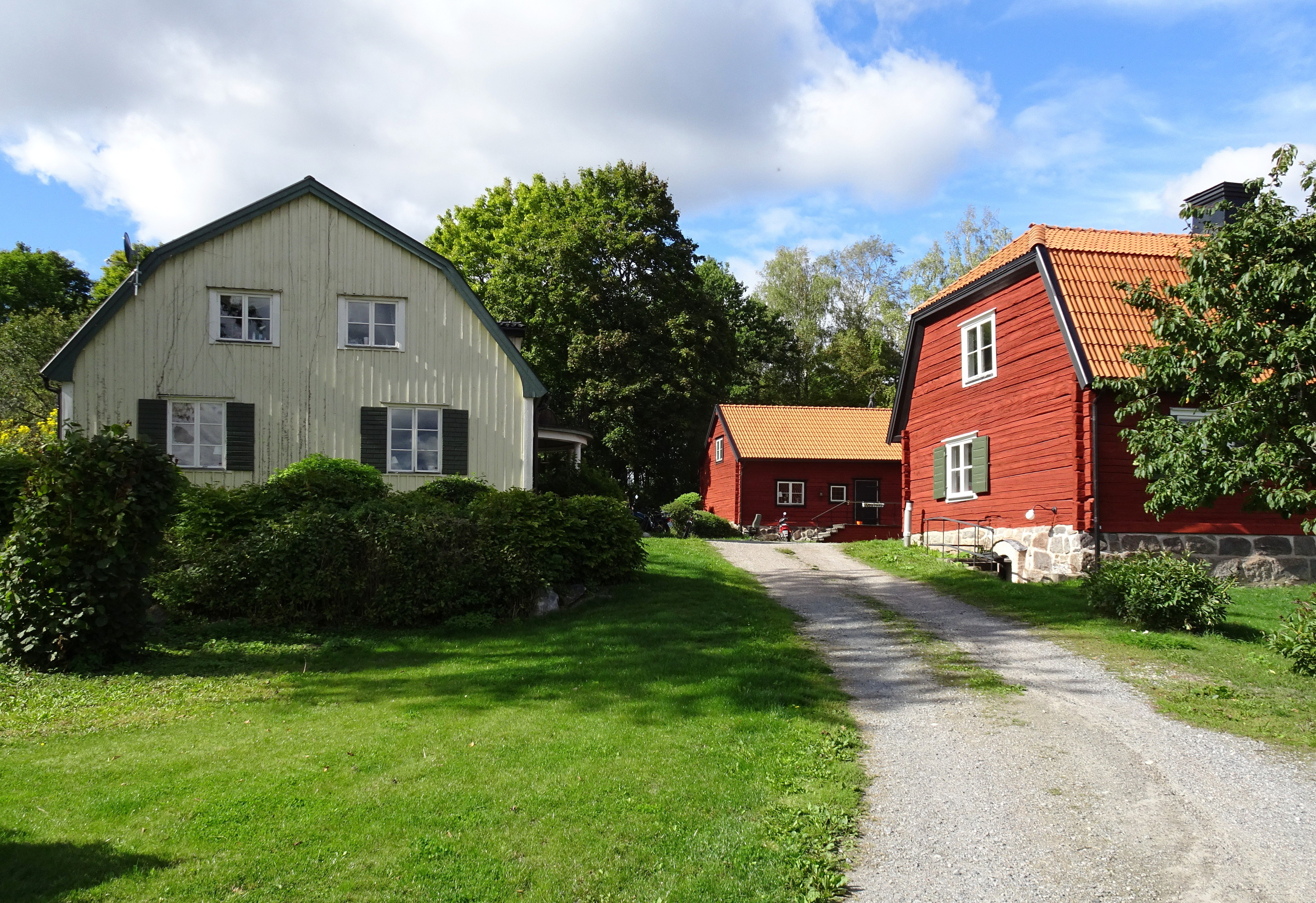

Älvnäs is a locality situated in Ekerö Municipality, Stockholm County, Sweden, with 601 inhabitants in 2010.
