= Flemingsbergsviken =

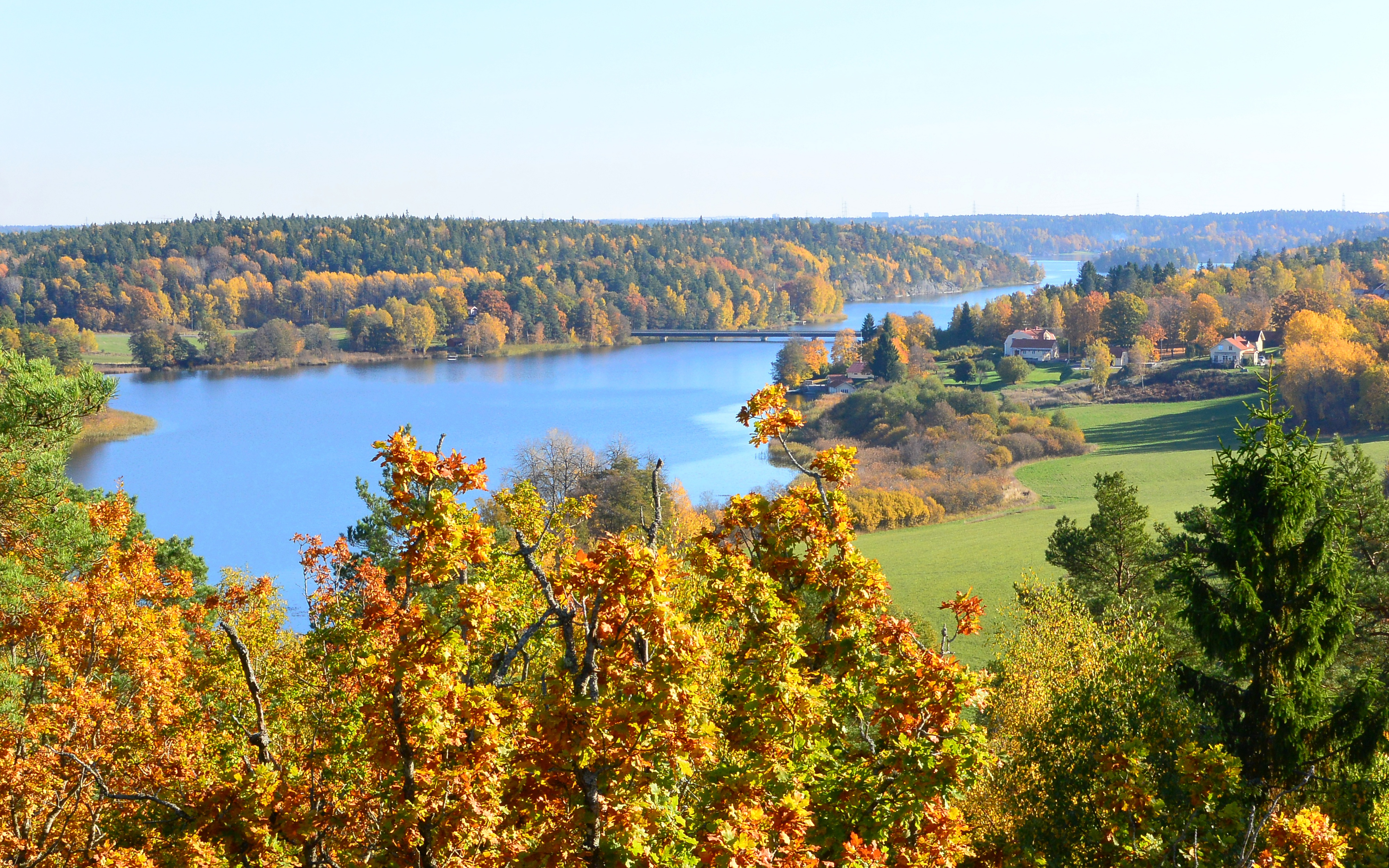
- View of the lake from the Stensätra fortress

- Location within Stockholm
- Coordinates: 59°13′N 18°00′E
- Basin countries: Sweden

Flemingsbergsviken is a lake in Stockholm County, Södermanland, Sweden. The lake is located just outside the southern suburbs of Stockholm.
