= Lurudden =

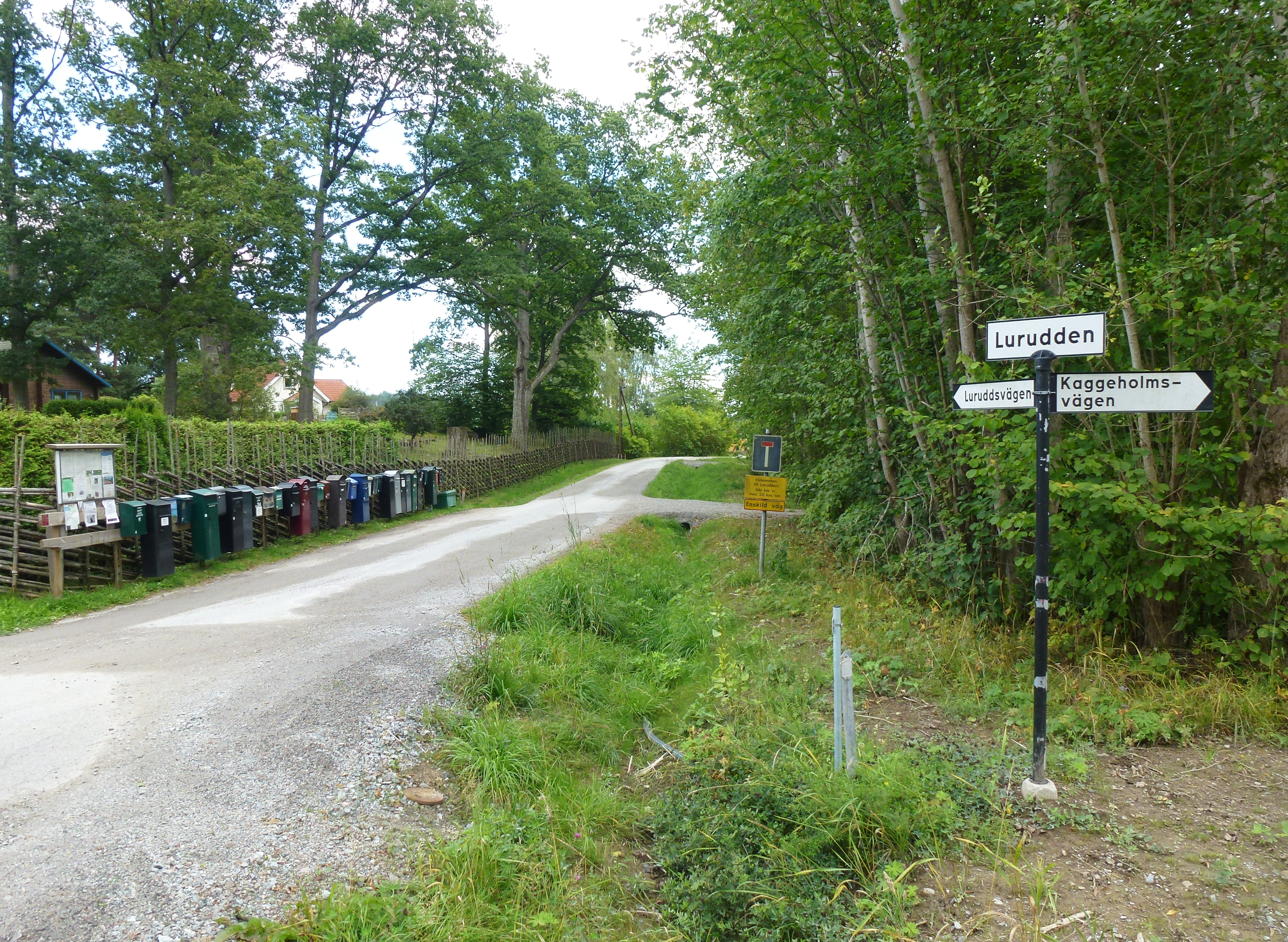
- Lurudden Helgo.jpg

- Location within Stockholm Location within Sweden
- Coordinates: 59°16′20″N 17°42′30″E
- Country: Sweden
- Province: Uppland
- County: Stockholm County
- Municipality: Ekerö Municipality

Area
  - Total: 0.44 km^{2} (0.17 sq mi)

Population (31 December 2020)
  - Total: 229
  - Density: 520/km^{2} (1,300/sq mi)
- Time zone: UTC+1 (CET)
  - Summer (DST): UTC+2 (CEST)

Lurudden is a locality situated in Ekerö Municipality, Stockholm County, Sweden with 205 inhabitants in 2010. It is located on the eastern part of the island Helgö.
