= Fågelvikshöjden =

- Location within Stockholm Location within Sweden Location within European Union
- Coordinates: 59°16′N 18°29′E
- Country: Sweden
- Province: Uppland
- County: Stockholm County
- Municipality: Värmdö Municipality

Area
  - Total: 0.49 km^{2} (0.19 sq mi)

Population (31 December 2020)
  - Total: 2,333
  - Density: 4,800/km^{2} (12,000/sq mi)
- Time zone: UTC+1 (CET)
  - Summer (DST): UTC+2 (CEST)

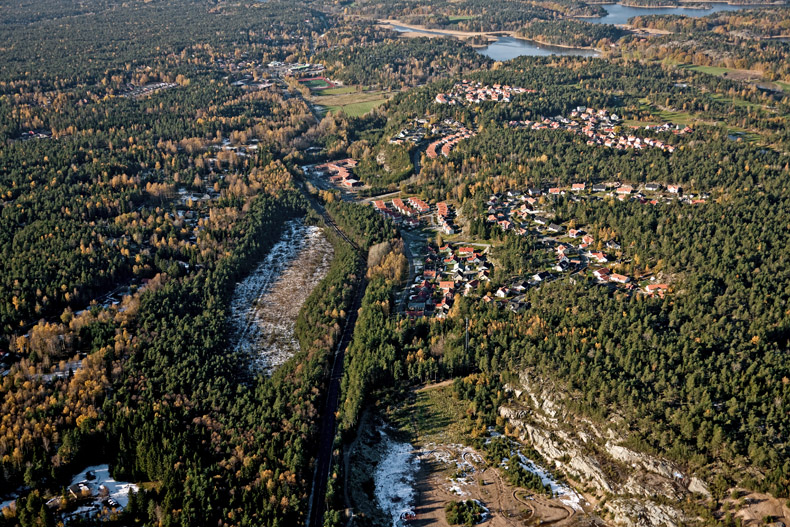
Fågelvikshöjden

Fågelvikshöjden is a locality situated in Värmdö Municipality, Stockholm County, Sweden with 1,043 inhabitants in 2010.
