= Johannesudd =

- Location within Stockholm Location within Sweden
- Coordinates: 59°33′N 18°02′E
- Country: Sweden
- Province: Uppland
- County: Stockholm County
- Municipality: Vallentuna Municipality

Area
  - Total: 0.10 km^{2} (0.039 sq mi)

Population (31 December 2020)
  - Total: 306
  - Density: 2,538/km^{2} (6,570/sq mi)
- Time zone: UTC+1 (CET)
  - Summer (DST): UTC+2 (CEST)

Johannesudd is a locality situated in Vallentuna Municipality, Stockholm County, Sweden.
