= Parksidan =

- Location within Stockholm Location within Sweden Location within European Union
- Coordinates: 59°17′N 17°50′E
- Country: Sweden
- Province: Uppland
- County: Stockholm County
- Municipality: Ekerö Municipality

Area
  - Total: 0.23 km^{2} (0.089 sq mi)

Population (31 December 2010)
  - Total: 494
  - Density: 2,169/km^{2} (5,620/sq mi)
- Time zone: UTC+1 (CET)
  - Summer (DST): UTC+2 (CEST)

Parksidan is a locality situated in Ekerö Municipality, Stockholm County, Sweden, with 494 inhabitants in 2010.
