= Håbo-Tibble kyrkby =

- Location within Stockholm Location within Sweden Location within European Union
- Coordinates: 59°35′N 17°40′E
- Country: Sweden
- Province: Uppland
- County: Stockholm County
- Municipality: Upplands-Bro Municipality

Area
  - Total: 0.33 km^{2} (0.13 sq mi)

Population (31 December 2010)
  - Total: 256
  - Density: 773/km^{2} (2,000/sq mi)
- Time zone: UTC+1 (CET)
  - Summer (DST): UTC+2 (CEST)

Håbo-Tibble kyrkby is a locality situated in Upplands-Bro Municipality, Stockholm County, Sweden. It had 256 inhabitants in 2010.
