= Yngern =

Lake in Stockholm County, Sweden

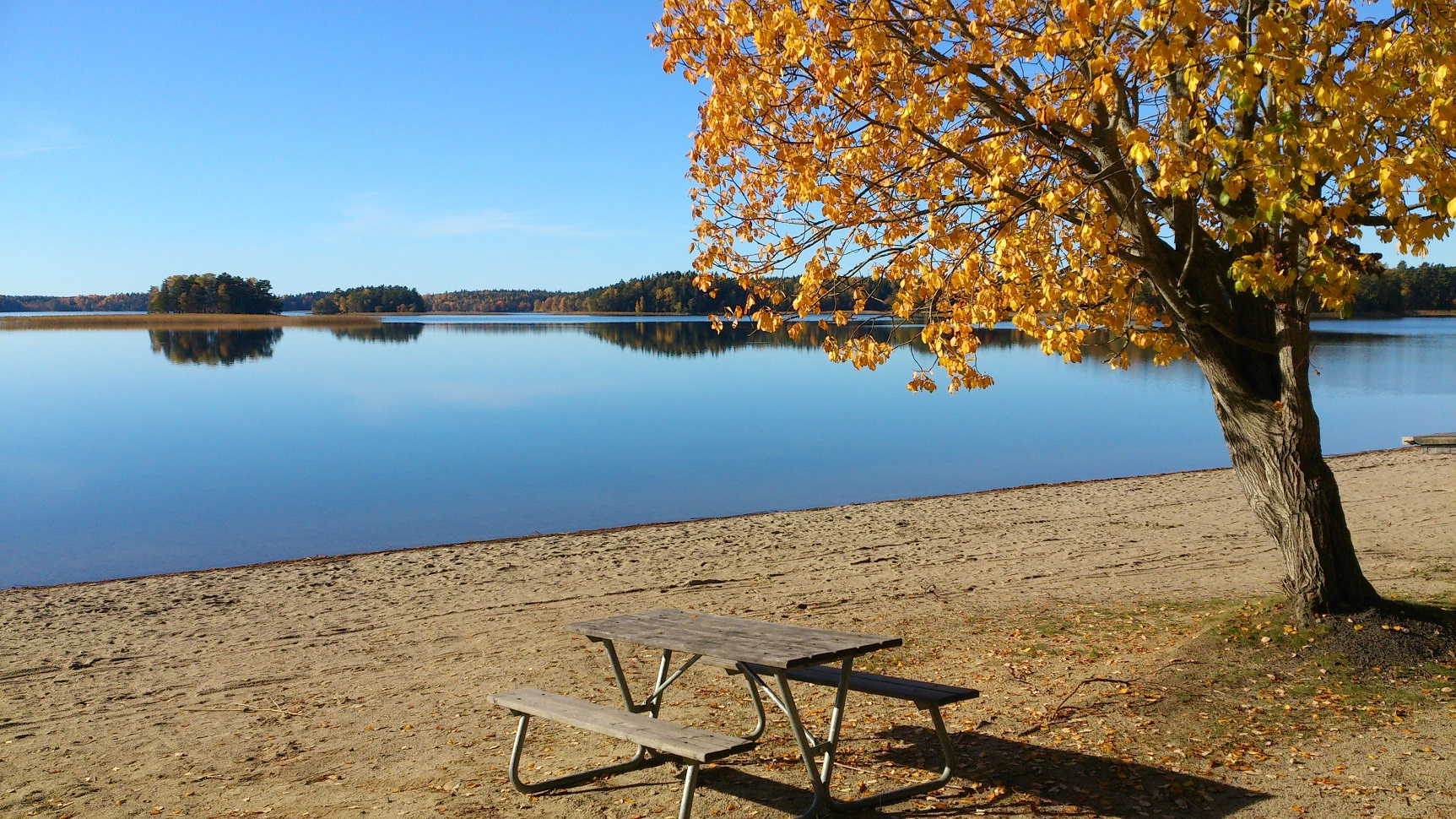

- Location within Stockholm
- Coordinates: 59°09′40″N 17°23′00″E
- Basin countries: Sweden

Yngern is a lake in Stockholm County, Södermanland, Sweden. A small part of the lake lies in Södermanland County.
