= Lundsjön–Dammsjön =

Lake in Sweden

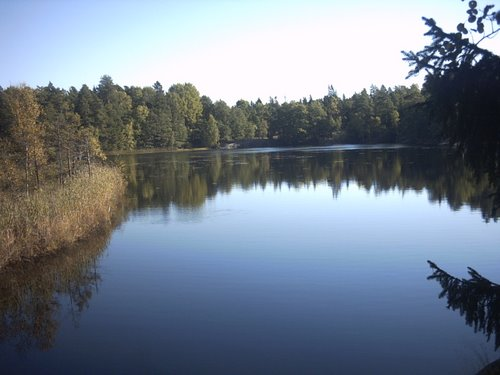

- Location within Stockholm
- Coordinates: 59°16′19″N 18°16′31″E
- Basin countries: Sweden

Lundsjön–Dammsjön is a lake in Stockholm County, Södermanland, Sweden.
