= Ramsjön, Haninge Municipality =

Lake in Stockholm County, Sweden

Ramsjön
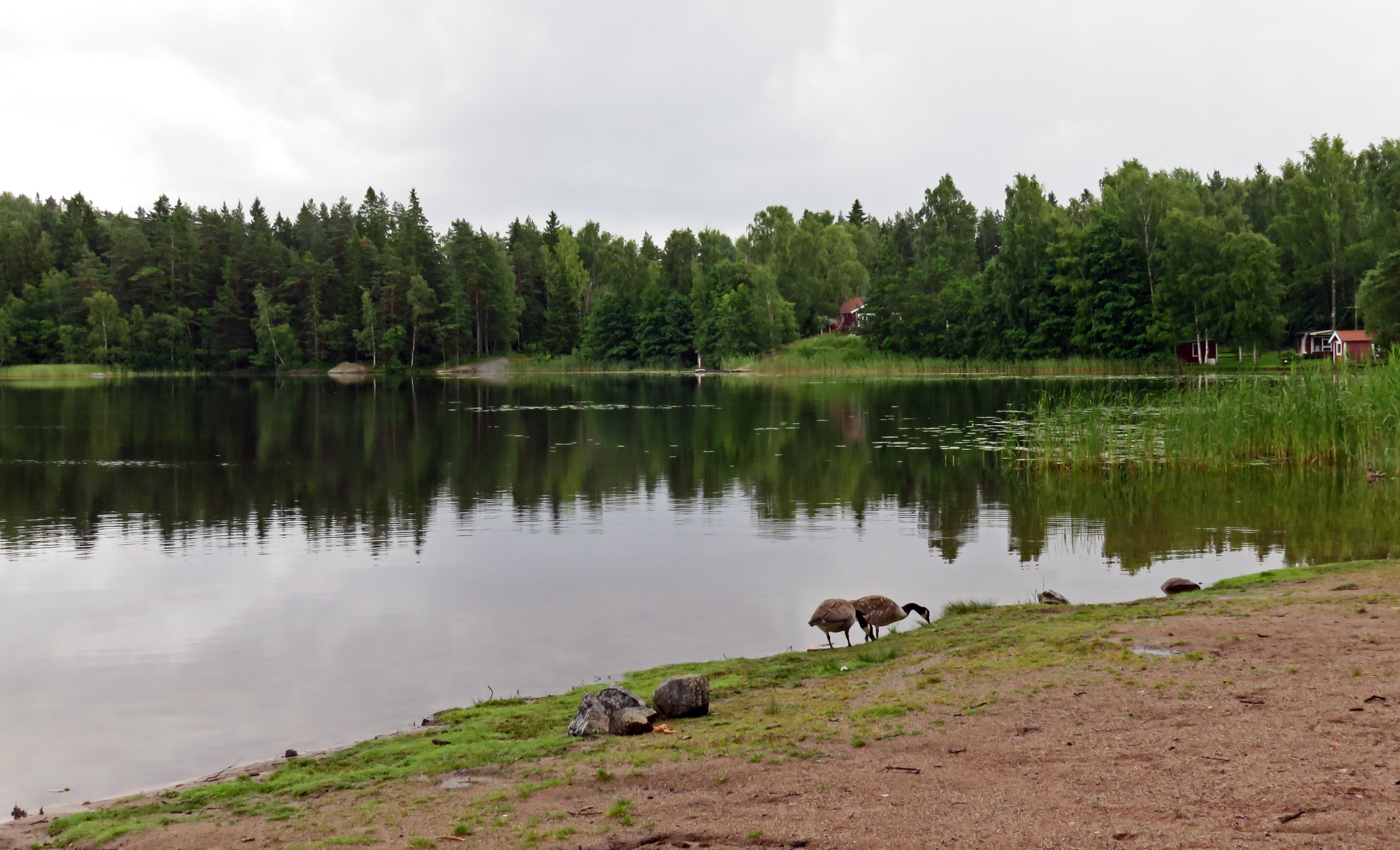

- Location within Stockholm
- Coordinates: 59°11′N 18°12′E
- Basin countries: Sweden

Ramsjön is a lake in Stockholm County, Södermanland, Sweden.
