= Grödby =

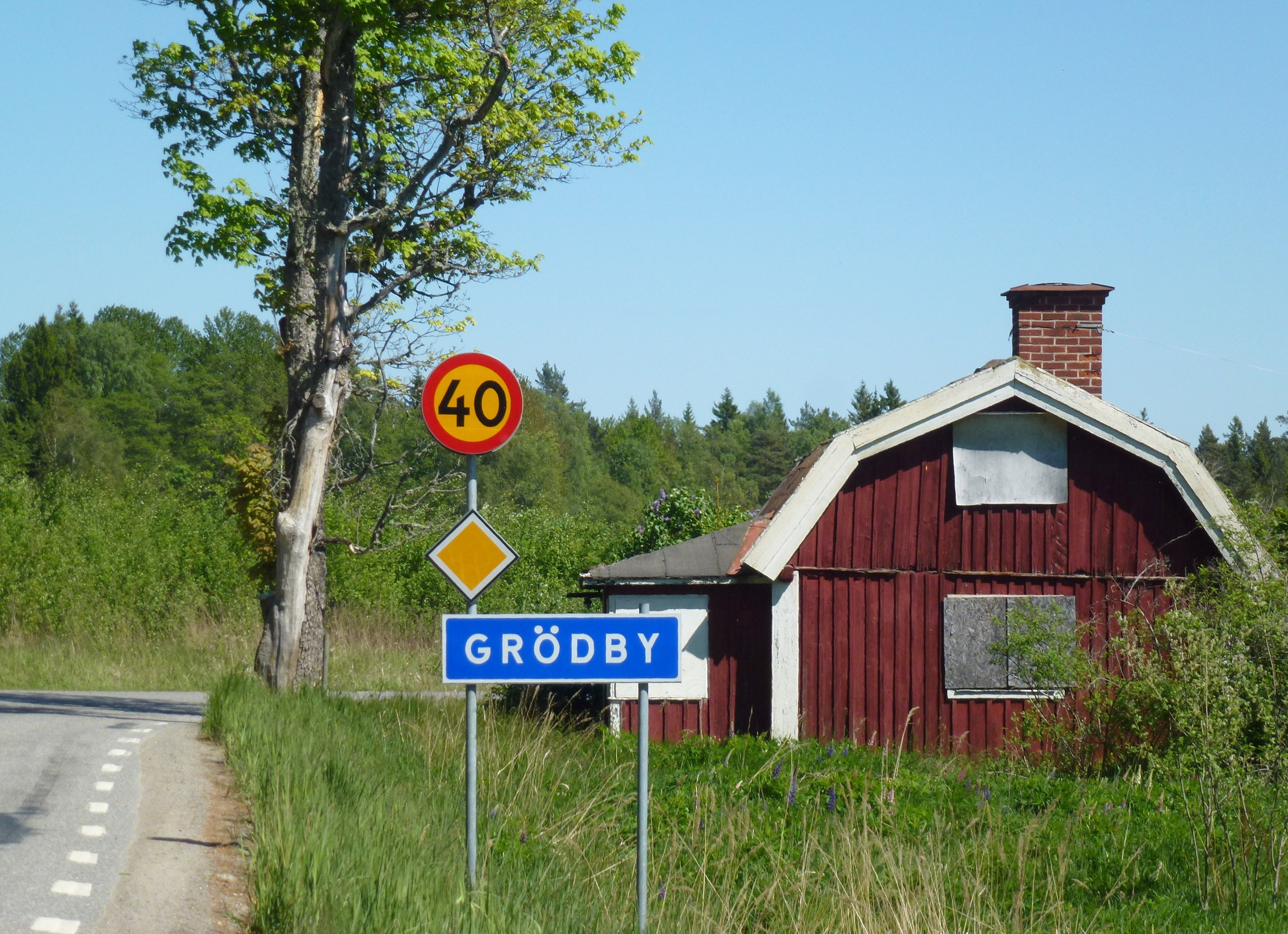

- Location within Stockholm Location within Sweden Location within European Union
- Coordinates: 59°03′N 17°53′E
- Country: Sweden
- Province: Södermanland
- County: Stockholm County
- Municipality: Nynäshamn Municipality

Area
  - Total: 0.45 km^{2} (0.17 sq mi)

Population (31 December 2020)
  - Total: 579
  - Density: 1,300/km^{2} (3,300/sq mi)
- Time zone: UTC+1 (CET)
  - Summer (DST): UTC+2 (CEST)

Grödby is a locality situated in Nynäshamn Municipality, Stockholm County, Sweden with 340 inhabitants in 2010.
