= Kungsberga =

- Location within Stockholm Location within Sweden Location within European Union
- Coordinates: 59°24′N 17°38′E
- Country: Sweden
- Province: Uppland
- County: Stockholm County
- Municipality: Ekerö Municipality

Area
  - Total: 0.52 km^{2} (0.20 sq mi)

Population (31 December 2020)
  - Total: 917
  - Density: 1,800/km^{2} (4,600/sq mi)
- Time zone: UTC+1 (CET)
  - Summer (DST): UTC+2 (CEST)

Kungsberga is a locality situated on the Lake Mälaren island of Färingsö, Ekerö Municipality, Stockholm County, Sweden, with 406 inhabitants in 2010.
