= Stockholm County =

County (län) of Sweden

Stockholm County Stockholms län (Swedish)
- County
- Flag Coat of arms

- Stockholm County in Sweden

- Location map of Stockholm County in Sweden
- Coordinates: 59°20′0″N 18°10′0″E
- Country: Sweden
- Formed: 1714
- Capital: Stockholm
- Municipalities: 26: Botkyrka; Danderyd; Ekerö; Haninge; Huddinge; Järfälla; Lidingö; Nacka; Norrtälje; Nykvarn; Nynäshamn; Österåker; Salem; Sigtuna; Södertälje; Sollentuna; Solna; Stockholm; Sundbyberg; Täby; Tyresö; Upplands Väsby; Upplands-Bro; Vallentuna; Värmdö; Vaxholm

Government
  - Governor: Cecilia Skingsley
  - Council: Stockholm Region

Area
  - Total: 6,519.3 km^{2} (2,517.1 sq mi)

Population (31 December 2023)
  - Total: 2,454,821
  - Rank: 1st
  - Density: 376.55/km^{2} (975.25/sq mi)
- Demonyms: Stockholmer; Stockholmite

GDP
  - Total: €179.24 billion (2024)
  - Per capita: €72,479 (2024)
- Time zone: UTC+1 (CET)
  - Summer (DST): UTC+2 (CEST)
- ISO 3166 code: SE-AB
- Website: www.regionstockholm.se www.lansstyrelsen.se

Stockholm County (Swedish: Stockholms län, pronounced [ˈstɔ̂kː(h)ɔlms ˈlɛːn]) is a county (Swedish: län) on the Baltic Sea coast of Sweden. It borders Uppsala County and Södermanland County. It also borders Mälaren and the Baltic Sea. The city of Stockholm is the capital of Sweden. Stockholm County is divided by the historic provinces of Uppland (Roslagen) and Södermanland (Södertörn). More than one fifth of the Swedish population lives in the county. Stockholm County is also one of the statistical riksområden (national areas) according to NUTS:SE, Nomenclature of Territorial Units for Statistics within the EU. With more than two million inhabitants, Stockholm is the most densely populated county of Sweden.

== History ==
Stockholm County was established in 1714. The City of Stockholm then constituted its own administrative entity under the Governor of Stockholm and was not part of Stockholm County. Though outside Stockholm County, the City of Stockholm was its seat.

On 1 January 1968, Stockholm County was united with the City of Stockholm. At the same time, the borders were redrawn in other directions too; Upplands-Bro Municipality was transferred from Uppsala County and a large part of the modern day Östhammar Municipality was transferred to Uppsala County.

== Geography ==
=== Lakes ===
- Flemingsbergsviken
- Karptjärn
- Långsjön, Hanveden
- Lundsjön–Dammsjön
- Mälaren (though not exclusively within Stockholm County).
- Måsnaren
- Ramsjön, Haninge kommun
- Segersjön
- Strålsjön
- Tullan
- Yngern

=== Nature and wildlife ===
In 2023, there were two national parks in Stockholm County: Tyresta National Park and Ängsö National Park. Tyresta National Park was established in 1993 and consists of a total of 1,962 hectares of coniferous forest, lakes, and wetlands. Its primeval forest is described by the County Administrative Board as "one of the finest in southern Sweden," and has trees up to 400 years old. Rare lichens, wood fungi, mosses, and beetles thrive in the forest. Ängsö National Park park is the older, having been established in 1909, and consists of 190 hectares of archipelago, meadows and pastures, and mixed forest. It is located on an island, only accessible by boat. The area has been kept open since the 1930s through mowing and grazing. Types of orchids such as elder-flowered orchid, frog orchid, lesser butterfly-orchid, greater butterfly-orchid, common twayblade, and bird's-nest orchid grow in the meadows.

The county also has a national city park, Royal National City Park. Established by an act of parliament in 1994, it is claimed to be the world's first "national urban park". The park includes old forest and cliffs as well as castles and museums.

== Economy ==
The Gross domestic product (GDP) of the region was 145.6 billion € in 2018, accounting for 30.9% of Swedish economic output. GDP per capita adjusted for purchasing power was €49,500 or 164% of the EU27 average in the same year. The GDP per employee was 132% of the EU average.

== Heraldry ==
Arms granted in 1968. The arms for the County of Stockholm is a combination of the arms of Uppland, Södermanland and the City of Stockholm. When it is shown with a royal crown it represents the County Administrative Board.

=== Riksdag ===
The table details all Riksdag elections held in Stockholm County since the unicameral era began in 1970. Stockholm and the wider county have separate parliamentary constituencies. The latter is named after the county as a whole.

Year	Votes	V	S	MP	C	L	KD	M	SD	NyD	Left	Right
1970	885,010	6.5	42.4		12.6	20.4	1.1	16.0			48.9	49.1
1973	921,509	8.0	38.9		18.5	10.8	1.0	21.8			46.9	51.2
1976	966,277	7.5	37.7		16.4	13.4	0.7	23.5			45.2	53.3
1979	963,497	8.7	37.8		11.2	11.9	0.8	28.7			46.6	51.8
1982	989,138	8.2	39.7	2.2	8.9	5.9	1.0	33.8			47.9	48.5
1985	1,012,325	7.5	38.2	1.7	4.8	16.6		30.5			45.7	51.9
1988	988,575	8.1	34.6	6.4	5.4	15.3	1.8	27.5			49.1	48.3
1991	1,012,456	5.4	29.9	4.5	3.7	11.7	5.0	31.5		7.6	35.3	52.0
1994	1,033,430	6.7	36.4	5.4	3.8	9.7	3.3	32.4		1.3	48.5	49.1
1998	1,026,227	10.8	29.2	4.9	2.2	6.6	10.8	33.8			44.9	52.7
2002	1,075,192	8.6	32.6	5.7	2.3	18.9	7.9	21.8	1.0		46.9	50.9
2006	1,139,679	5.9	24.9	7.1	5.5	9.5	6.0	37.0	1.8		37.9	57.9
2010	1,251,236	5.7	21.7	9.5	6.0	8.4	5.8	37.5	3.7		36.9	57.8
2014	1,341,760	6.0	23.0	9.2	5.0	7.4	4.9	30.5	8.4		38.2	47.8
2018	1,426,237	9.6	23.4	6.0	8.8	7.3	6.1	24.2	12.9		47.8	50.6

== Municipalities ==
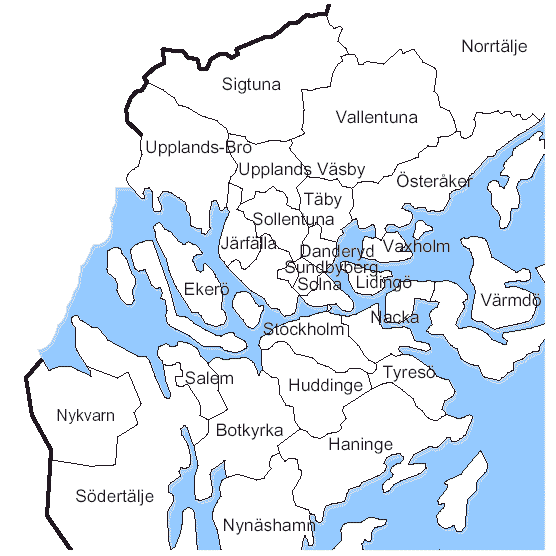

The county of Stockholm comprises 26 municipalities (kommuner):

municipality	pop. (2018)	area/km^{2}
Botkyrka	93,106	194
Danderyd	33,187	26
Ekerö	28,308	217
Haninge	89,989	458
Huddinge	111,722	131
Järfälla	78,480	54
Lidingö	47,818	31
Nacka	103,656	95
Norrtälje	61,769	2015
Nykvarn	10,923	153
Nynäshamn	28,290	359
Salem	16,786	54
Sigtuna	48,130	328
Sollentuna	72,528	53
Solna	80,950	19
Stockholm	962,154	187
Sundbyberg	50,564	9
Södertälje	97,381	525
Tyresö	48,004	69
Täby	71,397	61
Upplands-Bro	28,756	235
Upplands Väsby	45,543	75
Vallentuna	33,432	358
Vaxholm	12,023	58
Värmdö	44,397	448
Österåker	44,831	312

== Localities by population (2017) ==
All 132 built-up places (tätorter) in the county are shown below. These refer to contiguous settlements and may straddle municipal (and occasionally county) boundaries.

Pos	Locality	Population
1	Stockholm	1,562,136
2	Upplands Väsby	143,582
3	Södertälje	72,704
4	Lidingö	43,318
5	Tumba	41,599
6	Åkersberga	33,944
7	Vallentuna	32,394
8	Märsta	28,445
9	Gustavsberg	22,513
10	Norrtälje	20,322
11	Västerhaninge	17,429
12	Nynäshamn	14,792
13	Ekerö	11,524
14	Jordbro	10,923
15	Kungsängen	10,801
16	Saltsjöbaden	9,521
17	Sigtuna	9,312
18	Bro	8,635
19	Fisksätra	8,255
20	Järna	6,219
21	Vaxholm	5,023
22	Hallstavik	4,645
23	Brunna	3,953
24	Ösmo	3,947
25	Stenhamra	3,624
26	Resarö	3,300
27	Sticklinge udde	3,050
28	Vårsta	2,502
29	Norra Riksten	2,472
30	Svinninge	2,384
31	Fågelvikshöjden	2,323
32	Kopparmora	2,313
33	Pershagen	2,201
34	Stavsnäs	1,871
35	Rosersberg	1,826
36	Dalarö	1,812
37	Djurö	1,441
38	Älmsta	1,361
39	Sorunda	1,292
40	Brunn	1,273
41	Steningehöjden	1,273
42	Långvik	1,231
43	Lindholmen	1,180
44	Rindö	1,154
45	Mölnbo	1,075
46	Älgö	968
47	Kil	979
48	Parksidan	974
49	Ekeby	970
50	Kullö	906
51	Viksäter	898
52	Ingaröstrand	805
53	Älvnäs	801
54	Vidja	771
55	Lugnet and Skälsmara	753
56	Segersäng	753
57	Stora Vika	741
58	Kungsberga	731
59	Hästängen	694
60	Håbo-Tibble kyrkby	664
61	Gladö Kvarn	660
62	Ölsta	656
63	Bammarboda	648
64	Löwenströmska Lasarettet	633
65	Nyhagen och Översättra	627
66	Älvsala	610
67	Ekerö Sommarstad	598
68	Bergshamra	597
69	Arninge	589
70	Gräddö	579
71	Rydbo	578
72	Edsbro	573
73	Grödby	558
74	Kallfors	558
75	Hästhagen	531
76	Väländan	529
77	Svanberga	525
78	Kårsta	512
79	Östra Kallfors	491
80	Spånlöt	482
81	Spillersboda	479
82	Ängsvik	460
83	Solberga	454
84	Täljö	439
85	Årsta Havsbad	437
86	Sandviken	421
87	Rånäs	420
88	Grisslehamn	415
89	Tranholmen	405
90	Tuna	403
91	Sundby	400
92	Vattubrinken	399
93	Herräng	398
94	Stava	383
95	Lidatorp and Klövsta	378
96	Sibble	367
97	Tynningö	365
98	Drottningholm	364
99	Nolsjö	361
100	Norra Lagnö	357
101	Söderby	357
102	Södersvik	351
103	Ekskogen Älgeby and Långsjötorp	343
104	Riala	342
105	Rättarboda	339
106	Sättra	327
107	Koviksudde and Skeviksstrand	316
108	Betsede	314
109	Oxnö and Svärdsö	302
110	Laggarsvik and Linanäs	301
111	Söderby	297
112	Ekskogen	291
113	Granby	290
114	Johannesudd	290
115	Skarpö	289
116	Nysättra	274
117	Baldersnäs	269
118	Finsta	269
119	Muskö	268
120	Norra Vindö	268
121	Söderby-Karl	265
122	Östorp and Ådran	265
123	Landfjärden	263
124	Nibble	252
125	Brottby	251
126	Stensättra Tomtområde	250
127	Blidö	242
128	Skebobruk	236
129	Lurudden	226
130	Northern Muskö	226
131	Hilleshög	222
132	Lurudden	226

== Demographics ==
Stockholm county population pyramid in 2022

=== Population ===
The current population of Stockholm county is 2,440,027.

Foreign background within the Stockholm county by Municipality in 2021

=== Foreign background ===
Origin makeup of the Stockholm county by single year ages in 2022

Swedish born and foreign born in Stockholm county in 2022

Stockholm county population pyramid by origin in 2022

SCB have collected statistics on backgrounds of residents since 2002. These tables consist of all who have two foreign-born parents or are born abroad themselves. The chart lists election years and the last year on record alone.

Two foreign born parents or foreign born
Location	2002	2003	2004	2005	2006	2010	2014	2018	2019
Botkyrka	47.0	47.7	48.2	48.9	49.7	53.2	56.4	59.3	61.6
Danderyd	15.2	15.4	15.6	16.0	15.7	16.6	18.0	20.3	20.5
Ekerö	10.3	10.3	10.5	10.5	11.2	11.9	13.4	16.4	17.2
Haninge	24.4	24.7	25.1	25.4	26.2	29.3	32.3	36.2	37.3
Huddinge	28.1	28.8	29.1	29.8	30.9	34.0	37.2	40.7	41.3
Järfälla	25.4	25.6	26.4	27.0	27.9	32.1	36.4	42.5	44.0
Lidingö	15.6	15.8	15.9	16.0	16.3	17.9	19.4	21.9	22.3
Nacka	21.2	21.2	21.3	21.3	21.6	22.7	23.7	25.9	25.9
Norrtälje	10.4	10.5	10.7	10.8	11.0	12.1	13.3	15.9	16.4
Nykvarn	15.2	15.1	15.2	14.9	15.0	15.1	16.0	17.5	17.9
Nynäshamn	13.0	13.1	13.2	13.2	13.7	16.3	18.8	22.5	23.4
Salem	17.8	18.0	18.2	18.4	18.8	20.8	23.9	28.7	29.7
Sigtuna	26.4	26.7	26.9	27.0	27.6	31.8	37.9	44.9	46.2
Sollentuna	21.3	21.7	22.2	22.4	23.0	25.9	29.3	33.5	34.7
Solna	26.0	26.2	26.7	27.4	27.8	31.8	35.0	39.5	40.4
Stockholm	25.1	25.4	25.8	26.2	27.0	29.2	31.1	33.4	33.8
Sundbyberg	25.2	26.3	27.2	28.2	29.7	34.4	37.9	41.8	42.9
Södertälje	34.8	35.5	36.1	36.8	38.3	44.0	49.6	54.3	55.6
Tyresö	17.9	18.0	18.0	18.2	18.1	19.3	20.2	22.5	23.0
Täby	16.2	16.5	16.6	16.7	17.0	18.2	19.9	22.8	23.3
Upplands-Bro	23.6	24.1	24.3	26.7	25.1	28.3	31.1	37.1	39.0
Upplands Väsby	27.1	27.6	28.0	28.5	28.8	31.4	35.0	40.8	42.5
Vallentuna	13.3	13.6	13.5	13.8	13.9	14.7	16.1	18.6	19.7
Vaxholm	10.8	10.9	10.9	10.6	10.8	11.5	12.7	13.9	13.9
Värmdö	13.8	13.6	13.5	13.2	13.0	14.2	15.2	17.5	17.8
Österåker	14.3	14.2	14.2	14.3	14.3	15.5	17.5	20.7	21.1
Total	24.0	24.3	24.6	25.0	25.6	28.2	30.7	33.8	34.5
Source: SCB

All foreign background
Location	1991	2002	2011	2023
Botkyrka	45.8%	54.6%	62.3%	70.5%
Danderyd	19.1%	23.0%	26.1%	31.3%
Ekerö	17.3%	18.5%	21.4%	27.4%
Haninge	28.1%	33.1%	39.5%	50.0%
Huddinge	31.4%	36.9%	44.2%	52.5%
Järfälla	27.3%	33.9%	42.2%	59.0%
Lidingö	21.6%	23.7%	27.6%	33.2%
Nacka	27.9%	30.2%	32.7%	37.2%
Norrtälje	14.9%	17.0%	19.4%	25.4%
Nykvarn	23.5%	24.6%	24.3%	31.6%
Nynäshamn	15.3%	20.2%	24.9%	35.1%
Salem	24.9%	27.1%	31.3%	44.4%
Sigtuna	30%	35.1%	42.8%	59.7%
Sollentuna	25.2%	29.5%	35.9%	48.1%
Solna	29.0%	34.5%	42.3%	54.6%
Stockholm	26.3%	33.6%	39.5%	45.6%
Sundbyberg	28.0%	34.1%	44.6%	56.3%
Södertälje	36.1%	42.6%	53.6%	67.3%
Tyresö	26.3%	27.4%	29.5%	35.1%
Täby	22.2%	24.7%	28.0%	35.9%
Upplands-Bro	30.1%	32.6%	38.9%	54.8%
Upplands Väsby	32.2%	36.4%	42.3%	56.7%
Vallentuna	19.6%	21.8%	24.5%	31.4%
Vaxholm	14.8%	18.7%	20.9%	22.9%
Värmdö	23.6%	23.1%	24.3%	28.4%
Österåker	21.2%	22.5%	25.1%	32.4%

Origin background	1991	2001	2002	2011	2023
All foreign background	27.1%	31.9%	32.4%	38.2%	46.5%
Foreign born	15.7%	17.9%	18.1%	21.7%	27.3%
Born in Sweden with two foreign born parents	11.4%	14.0%	5.9%	7.2%	9.3%
Born in Sweden with one parent born in Sweden and one foreign born parent	11.4%	14.0%	8.5%	9.3%	10.0%
Born in Sweden with two parents born in Sweden	72.9%	68.1%	67.6%	61.8%	53.5%

Origin background by country of background
Country of Background	1991	2001
Sweden	1 207 000	1 252 000
Finland	143 000	144 000
Other Nordic Countries	35 000	36 000
Germany	26 000	26 000
Poland	17 000	20 000
Other Europe	92 000	163 500
Iran	4 000	24 000
Iraq	13 000	23 000
Turkey	23 000	32 000
Other Asia	35 000	63 000
Latin America	27 000	36 500
Africa	20 000	45 500
Other	13 000	19 500

=== Country of birth ===
Foreign born population by country of birth
Country of birth	1970	1976	1981	1986	1991	1996	2001	2006	2011	2016	2021	2024
Iraq	59						19,193	27,420	38,996	42,103	44,978	44,254
Finland	69,443	74,663	87,706	81,212	75,192	70,685	66,619	60,949	55,561	51,172	45,097	41,746
Poland	3,320	4,685	6,866	9,892	11,518	12,150	12,692	17,539	27,005	34,450	35,260	35,959
Iran				4,532	10,721	14,629	18,050	20,375	24,261	27,218	31,295	32,790
Syria	49						6,946	8,090	10,025	24,639	30,806	31,433
Turkey	1,983	5,203	9,099	11,630	14,333	15,994	17,174	19,069	21,617	22,632	24,695	25,386
India	386			1,745	2,268	2,594	3,248	3,974	6,021	9,810	19,423	24,466
Ukraine							750	1,281	2,208	3,367	6,053	17,248
China	270						3,710	5,811	10,084	12,646	16,074	16,833
Afghanistan	9						1,643	2,981	4,489	7,192	13,625	15,229
Eritrea							2,066	3,727	6,095	10,159	13,567	14,534
Chile	84			8,277	13,267	12,994	13,404	13,989	14,497	14,239	13,947	13,618
Somalia	13						5,412	6,631	9,584	11,588	12,945	13,404
Pakistan	99						1,869	2,427	4,095	5,333	10,583	13,361
Germany	14,009	12,341	11,797	11,576	11,170	10,884	10,993	11,001	11,958	12,540	12,850	13,310
United Kingdom	2,360	2,807	3,363	3,731	4,458	5,012	6,000	6,681	7,955	9,917	12,028	12,245
Russia	2,173	2,121	2,203	2,398	3,560	3,500	3,146	4,571	6,684	8,301	9,895	11,139
Thailand	54						3,660	5,762	8,743	10,065	10,995	11,129
Ethiopia	163						6,090	6,236	7,757	9,083	10,407	10,899
Greece	2,913	6,155	7,301	6,604	6,788	6,292	6,012	5,963	6,468	8,746	10,125	10,819
United States	3,573	3,444	3,480	3,827	4,618	5,149	5,636	5,560	6,628	7,778	9,543	9,965
Romania	457						2,665	2,845	5,018	7,100	8,298	8,936
Bangladesh							2,170	2,881	4,106	5,045	7,973	8,871
Yugoslavia (historic)	5,129	6,275	6,994	7,401	8,451	10,466	10,565	10,245	9,919	9,534	8,857	8,424
Bosnia and Herzegovina						4,163	5,112	5,536	6,205	7,163	8,130	8,135
Italy	3,041	2,611	2,473	2,350	2,435		2,656	2,687	3,404	4,937	6,289	7,106
Norway	9,752	8,885	8,384	8,205	9,607	8,541	8,278	7,865	7,437	7,269	7,038	6,909
Lebanon	95						5,057	5,455	5,872	6,298	6,732	6,761
France	1,322						2,789	3,006	3,796	4,814	5,953	6,517
Egypt	182						1,109	1,363	2,405	3,728	5,928	6,428

== County Administrative Board ==
Prior to 1968 the County of Stockholm did not include the City of Stockholm. The City was instead under the Office of the Governor of Stockholm, and the County included the surrounding countryside. The County had its separate Governor of Stockholm County.

The main aim of the County Administrative Board is to fulfill the goals set in national politics by the Riksdag and the Government, to coordinate the interests of the county, to promote the development of the county, to establish regional goals and safeguard the due process of law in the handling of each case. The County Administrative Board is a Government Agency headed by a governor.

See List of Stockholm Governors.

County officials
Governor	Claes Lindgren	22 April 2024
County Council President	Aida Hadzialic	17 October 2022
Region Police Chief	Mattias Andersson	1 January 2024

== County council ==
The local administration of the county is under Stockholm County Council (Stockholms läns landsting). Its main responsibilities are for the public healthcare system and public transport.

The county council has 149 members elected by proportional representation through elections held in conjunction with the general elections every four years. The county council itself elects the county's executive committee.

The president of the committee also holds the title Commissioner of Finance. The current president is Aida Hadzialic, of the Social Democratic Party, who previously served as a minister in the Ministry of Education and Research. The members of the executive committee (landstingsstyrelsen) represent both the political majority and the opposition, with responsibility for implementing policies approved by the county council.

=== Elections ===
Stockholm County contains two multi-seat constituencies for county council elections. Stockholm Municipality makes up the first constituency while the second makes up the rest of the county.

==== Council elections 2002-2018 ====
Year	Moderate Party			Christian Democrats			Centre Party			Liberals			Green Party			Social Democratic Party			Left Party			Sweden Democrats			others		
Year	Votes	%	Seats	Votes	%	Seats	Votes	%	Seats	Votes	%	Seats	Votes	%	Seats	Votes	%	Seats	Votes	%	Seats	Votes	%	Seats	Votes	%	Seats
2002	259 597	23,8	37	75 928	6,9	11	24 161	2,2	0	180 043	16,5	26	50 469	4,6	7	374 690	34,3	54	100 306	9,2	14	8 508	0,6	0	16 464	1,7	0
2006	407 322	35,7	55	68 025	6,0	6	45 082	4,0	6	116 564	10,2	16	74 837	6,6	10	312 486	27,4	43	75 231	6,6	10	18 592	1,6	0	22 964	2,0	0
2010	460 871	36,7	57	59 273	4,7	7	47 956	3,8	6	116 858	9,3	15	121 660	9,7	15	321 268	25,6	39	77 578	6,2	10	35 496	2,8	0	13 884	1,1	0
2014	381 667	28,6	43	75 529	5,6	9	58 906	4,4	7	111 676	8,2	13	135 992	10,0	15	358 324	26,4	41	104 479	7,7	12	79 452	5,9	9	49 587	2,7	0
2018	321 783	22,3	34	111 877	7,7	12	115 78	8,0	12	115 746	8,0	12	81 404	5,6	7	379 008	26,2	40	152 784	10,6	16	140 773	9,7	15	25 627	1,8	0

=== Hospitals ===
The county council operates most of the hospitals in the county, some of the major facilities are:

- Karolinska University Hospital. The hospital contains two major facilities; one in Solna and one in Huddinge (since the merger with Huddinge University Hospital in 2004).
- Södersjukhuset
- Danderyd Hospital
- Södertälje Hospital
- Norrtälje Hospital
- S:t Erik Ocular Clinic

=== Public transport ===
The county council is responsible for the public transport in Stockholm. The main organizers of the transportation system are two publicly owned companies. Storstockholms Lokaltrafik, SL, handles the bus, tram and train services while the boat traffic is handled by Waxholmsbolaget. The operation and maintenance of the public transport systems is delegated by the companies to several contractors.

The county is also responsible for paratransit services and Närtrafiken, a number of share taxi routes.

=== Culture and education ===
Besides the health and transportation services, the county council operates Stockholm County Museum, and two agricultural high schools at Berga and Säbyholm.

== See also ==
- Largest metropolitan areas in the Nordic countries
- List of European regions by GDP
- List of metropolitan areas in Sweden
- Stockholm (National Area)
