= Lugnet and Skälsmara =

- Location within Stockholm Location within Sweden Location within European Union
- Coordinates: 59°15′19″N 18°32′20″E
- Country: Sweden
- Province: Uppland
- County: Stockholm County
- Municipality: Värmdö Municipality

Area
  - Total: 1.99 km^{2} (0.77 sq mi)

Population (31 December 2010)
  - Total: 625
  - Density: 314/km^{2} (810/sq mi)
- Time zone: UTC+1 (CET)
  - Summer (DST): UTC+2 (CEST)

Lugnet and Skälsmara (Lugnet och Skälsmara) is a locality situated in Värmdö Municipality, Stockholm County, Sweden with 625 inhabitants in 2010.
