= Sigtuna Municipality =

Sigtuna Municipality Sigtuna kommun
- Municipality
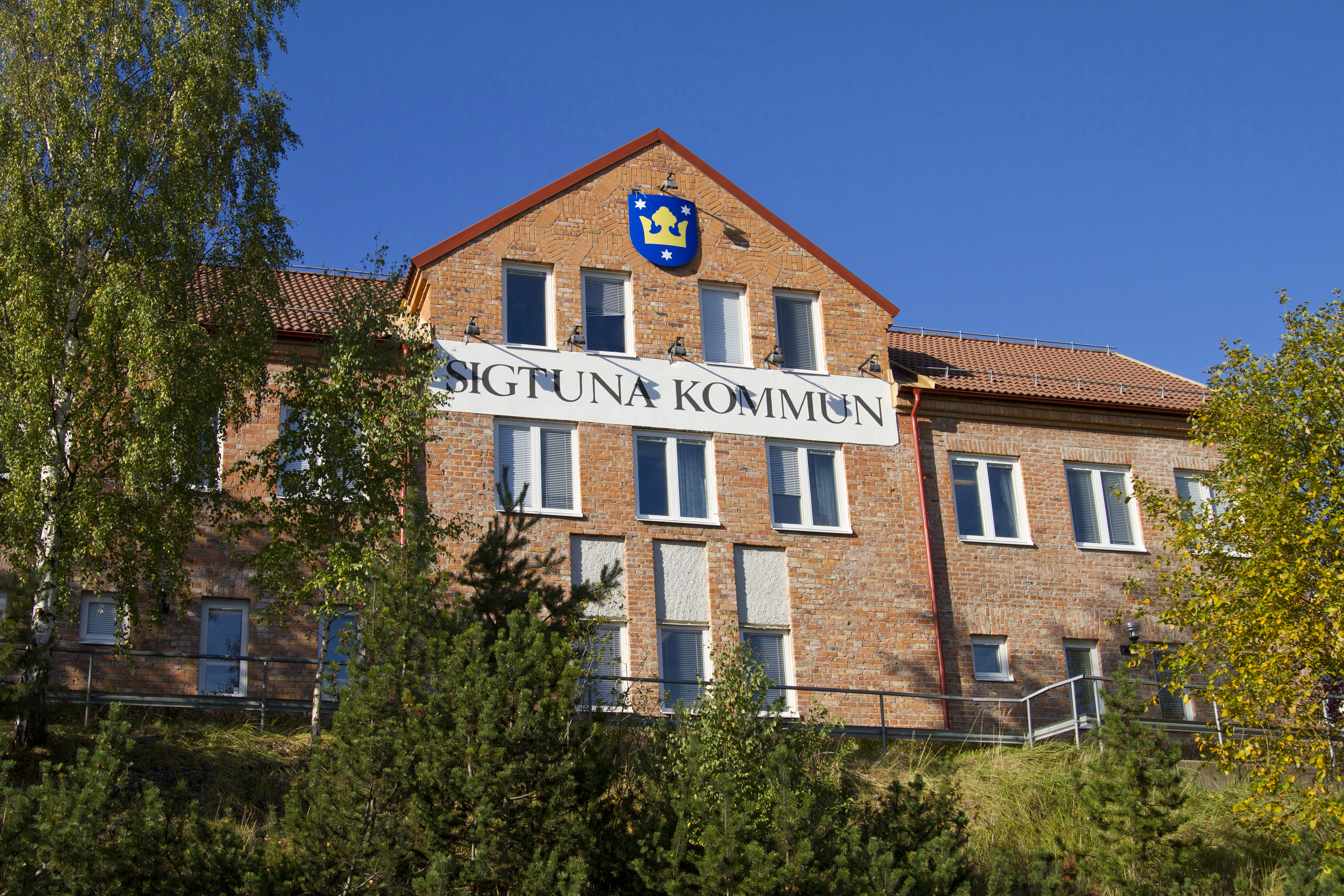
- Head Office of Sigtuna Municipality in Märsta

- Coat of arms

- Coordinates: 59°37′N 17°43′E
- Country: Sweden
- County: Stockholm County
- Seat: Märsta

Area
  - Total: 349.74 km^{2} (135.04 sq mi)
  - Land: 327.4 km^{2} (126.4 sq mi)
  - Water: 22.34 km^{2} (8.63 sq mi)
- Area as of 1 January 2014.

Population (30 June 2025)
  - Total: 52,926
  - Density: 161.7/km^{2} (418.7/sq mi)
- Demonyms: Sigtuner; Sigtunan; Sigtunian
- Time zone: UTC+1 (CET)
  - Summer (DST): UTC+2 (CEST)
- Province: Uppland
- Municipal code: 0191
- Website: www.sigtuna.se
- Density is calculated using land area only.

Sigtuna Municipality (Swedish: Sigtuna kommun) is a municipality in Stockholm County, Sweden. Its seat is located in the town of Märsta, approximately 37 km (23 mi) north of the Swedish capital, Stockholm. The municipality is a part of Metropolitan Stockholm.

The municipality consists of several former local government units and was formed in 1971. It got its name from the small, but very old, City of Sigtuna, but the seat was placed in the larger modern town of Märsta. The three towns of the municipality are Märsta (pop. 23,000), Sigtuna (pop. 8,000) and Rosersberg (pop. 1,400), of which Märsta is the municipal seat and Sigtuna with its old and important history is a popular tourist destination.

Sigtuna Municipality is also home to Stockholm Arlanda Airport, the main airport serving Stockholm, and the largest airport in Sweden.

== Demography ==
=== Population development ===
Population development in Sigtuna Municipality 1950–2022
Year	Population
1950	6,516
1955	7,300
1960	9,461
1965	17,705
1970	26,062
1975	26,615
1980	28,276
1985	29,300
1990	31,485
1995	33,406
2000	35,001
2001	35,518
2002	35,771
2003	36,028
2004	36,322
2005	36,711
2006	36,976
2007	37,793
2008	38,272
2009	39,219
2010	39,990
2011	41,329
2012	42,272
2013	43,372
2014	44,085
2015	44,786
2016	46,274
2017	47,146
2018	48,130
2019	48,964
Source: SCB - Folkmängd efter region och år.

=== 2022 population by district ===
This is a demographic table based on Sigtuna Municipality's electoral districts in the 2022 Swedish general election sourced from SVT's election platform, in turn taken from SCB official statistics.

There were 50,180 residents, including 33,030 Swedish citizens of voting age. 42.5% voted for the left coalition and 54.6% for the right coalition. Indicators are in percentage points except population totals and income.

Location	Residents	Citizen adults	Left vote	Right vote	Employed	Swedish parents	Foreign heritage	Income SEK	Degree
Location			%	%					
Arenberga	2,228	1,638	43.6	54.2	81	64	36	27,530	36
Björkbacka-Charlottenberg	1,751	1,151	28.2	69.8	79	70	30	30,436	44
Brännbo-Klockbacken	2,127	1,519	39.0	59.3	72	67	33	25,868	46
Centrala Marsta	1,848	1,274	51.2	46.5	76	50	50	24,897	39
Centrala Sigtuna	2,234	1,686	34.2	64.5	81	82	18	31,601	52
Gamla Märsta	1,893	1,197	50.4	45.8	76	44	56	24,194	33
Lunda-Skepptuna-Vidbo	1,333	988	35.0	64.0	85	85	15	27,660	25
Munkholmen	1,420	1,019	30.6	68.2	81	77	23	35,692	56
Norra Ekilla	1,356	957	42.1	56.0	82	65	35	28,525	36
N Rosersberg-Skånela	1,526	1,090	31.7	66.7	84	79	21	29,750	32
Norra Sigtuna	964	740	30.9	67.8	80	78	22	29,402	46
Norra Valsta	2,119	1,172	56.9	35.0	66	22	78	19,981	31
Nymärsta	1,839	1,105	55.7	40.8	70	23	77	21,041	35
Odensala	1,429	1,040	31.9	66.7	87	86	14	30,394	33
Prästängen-Ragvaldsbo	1,453	1,255	38.9	59.6	81	73	27	29,921	47
Rävsta-Steningehöjden	1,675	1,018	35.7	62.0	84	51	49	29,503	41
Sjudargården-S:t Per	1,894	1,420	32.0	67.1	82	80	20	32,814	53
Steninge slottsby	2,335	1,553	44.8	53.4	80	48	52	28,340	44
Sundveda-S Ekilla	2,242	1,461	44.6	52.3	73	47	53	23,630	33
Sätuna	1,664	1,193	50.1	47.6	72	53	47	23,574	35
Södra Rosersberg	1,393	1,041	41.5	57.2	83	76	24	27,806	36
Södra Valsta	2,603	1,326	55.0	35.3	64	14	86	19,410	29
Tingvalla	2,094	1,121	60.5	32.3	65	19	81	19,844	29
Valsta C	2,089	1,112	54.1	41.0	64	18	82	19,586	29
Västra Steninge	2,452	1,648	43.6	54.9	80	47	53	27,864	36
Östra Norrbacka	1,916	1,178	53.2	39.7	71	41	59	23,429	32
Östra Valsta	2,303	1,128	56.2	36.6	68	18	82	20,625	36
Source: SVT

== Industry ==
In the municipality lies the largest workplace in Sweden, the Arlanda Airport, with 13,000 employees in 200 companies. As a result, Sigtuna is travelled through by 18,300,000 visitors yearly, and has the fourth most hotel stays, following to the commercial and regional centres Stockholm, Gothenburg and Malmö.

Swedavia, the Swedish airport management company, has its head office on the airport property. Scandinavian Airlines previously had its head office on the airport property.

== International relations ==
=== Twin towns – Sister cities ===
The municipality is twinned with:

- Sønderborg Municipality in Denmark
- Rakvere in Estonia
- Raisio in Finland
- Porsgrunn in Norway
