= Södertälje Municipality =

Södertälje Municipality Södertälje kommun
- Municipality
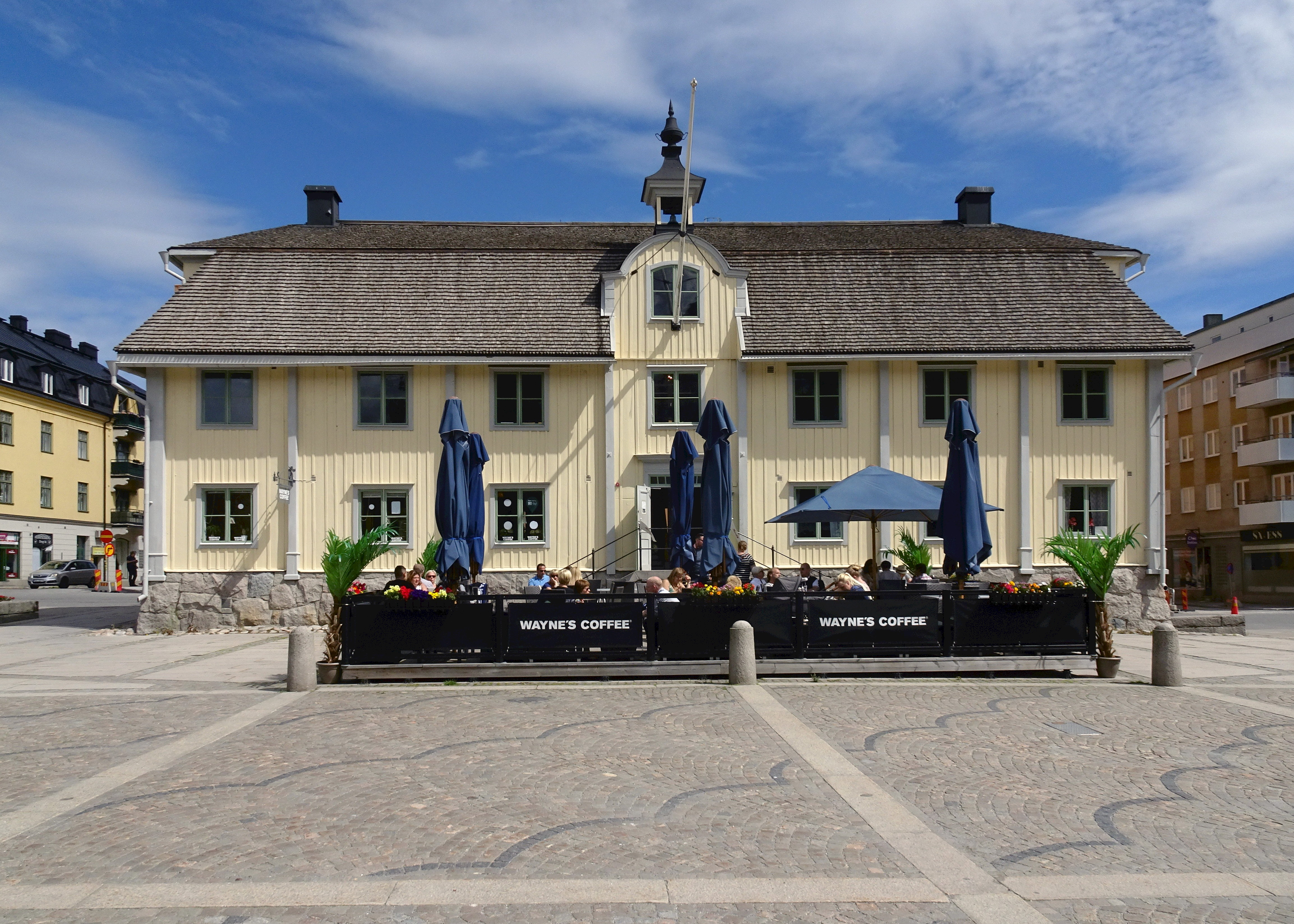
- Södertälje Old Town Hall

- Coat of arms

- Coordinates: 59°11′N 17°38′E
- Country: Sweden
- County: Stockholm County
- Seat: Södertälje

Area
  - Total: 694.24 km^{2} (268.05 sq mi)
  - Land: 525.15 km^{2} (202.76 sq mi)
  - Water: 169.09 km^{2} (65.29 sq mi)
- Area as of 1 January 2014.

Population (30 June 2025)
  - Total: 102,931
  - Density: 196.00/km^{2} (507.65/sq mi)
- Time zone: UTC+1 (CET)
  - Summer (DST): UTC+2 (CEST)
- ISO 3166 code: SE
- Province: Södermanland
- Municipal code: 0181
- Website: www.sodertalje.se
- Density is calculated using land area only.

Södertälje Municipality (Swedish: Södertälje kommun) is a municipality in Stockholm County in east central Sweden. Its seat is located in the city of Södertälje.

It borders to Lake Mälaren in the north and the Baltic Sea in the south, and within the Stockholm County to Nykvarn Municipality and Salem Municipality and also border Södermanland County and its municipals Gnesta and Trosa.

The municipality was created 1967–1971 through the amalgamation of the former City of Södertälje with large rural and suburban areas surrounding it. In 1999, it was split when a new entity, Nykvarn Municipality, was detached from Södertälje Municipality.

== Economy ==
Two big industries dominate Södertälje. Scania AB is a world leading manufacturer of trucks and busses and employed over 9,000 people. AstraZeneca is an international manufacturer of drugs (medicine) employing over 3,000 people. The municipal Södertälje itself employs over 5,600 people including teachers and people working with elderly people.

Södertälje has a canal, Södertälje Canal, that is important for the ships who want to reach the big lake Mälaren from the Baltic Sea.

== Demography ==
Södertälje has the fifth largest number of Finnish-speaking Sweden Finns in Sweden: 11,000, or around 13 per cent of the city population. Thus, taken together, Finns and an estimated 120,000 Assyrians in Sweden and account for 40 per cent of the inhabitants of the city.

=== 2022 population by district ===
This is a demographic table based on Södertälje Municipality's electoral districts in the 2022 Swedish general election sourced from SVT's election platform, in turn taken from SCB official statistics.

In total there were 67,079 Swedish citizens of voting age resident in the municipality. 44.9% voted for the left coalition and 53.4% for the right coalition. Indicators are in percentage points except population totals and income.

Location	Residents	Citizen adults	Left vote	Right vote	Employed	Swedish parents	Foreign heritage	Income SEK	Degree
Location			%	%					
1 Södra Värdsholmen	1,845	1,307	49.8	48.9	77	49	51	25,927	37
2 Saltskog Ö	1,785	1,083	44.4	53.7	79	39	61	25,822	40
3 Saltskog V	1,846	1,042	47.4	50.3	69	26	74	21,837	32
4 Västergård-Vibergen	2,256	1,412	40.7	57.9	79	45	55	26,731	33
5 Mariekälla S	1,594	1,391	44.1	54.8	81	49	51	28,539	44
6 Västergård-Högmo	2,273	1,406	41.4	56.8	76	28	72	26,636	47
7 Mariekälla N	1,794	1,344	48.7	50.0	83	59	41	27,993	46
8 Centrum S	1,550	1,160	48.5	50.1	75	51	49	25,415	38
9 Blombacka	2,882	1,594	48.1	48.5	69	22	78	21,384	32
10 Tälje	2,174	1,580	47.7	50.7	76	55	45	25,995	36
11 Centrum N	1,470	1,058	48.8	50.0	73	46	54	24,167	38
12 Bårstabergen V	992	674	45.3	52.6	75	48	52	23,982	24
13 Bårstabergen Ö	2,099	1,583	48.6	50.5	73	45	55	22,489	40
14 Snäckviken	1,848	940	49.3	47.3	72	20	80	22,334	38
15 Glasberga	3,050	1,847	23.5	75.6	83	24	76	28,594	44
16 Östertälje	2,293	1,772	47.3	51.5	83	62	38	31,041	53
17 Fornbacka	2,205	1,102	50.3	46.0	62	19	81	18,286	32
18 Hagaberg-Majtorp	1,754	1,390	44.8	53.5	83	66	34	30,305	47
19 Rosenlund V	1,679	1,222	47.2	51.3	78	55	45	25,957	39
20 Rosenlund Ö	1,581	1,206	50.1	48.3	80	54	46	26,502	33
21 Grusåsen V	2,245	1,663	44.2	54.0	74	49	51	25,307	41
22 Grusåsen Ö	1,979	1,332	45.2	52.5	69	42	58	22,858	33
23 Brunnsäng Ö	1,854	1,291	44.4	53.9	75	45	55	24,283	32
24 Brunnsäng V	1,647	987	48.3	50.6	69	27	73	20,525	34
25 Bergvik	1,380	1,085	48.3	50.1	75	51	49	23,170	38
26 Fornhöjden	1,985	1,229	55.3	42.3	65	15	85	19,385	32
27 Viksberg	1,375	1,029	35.9	63.0	87	76	24	34,619	39
28 Vitorp	2,093	1,361	28.7	70.3	82	36	64	27,643	43
29 Ragnhildsborg	1,500	1,014	38.1	60.6	85	40	60	28,443	46
30 Pershagen	2,263	1,697	39.1	59.9	87	75	25	33,898	49
31 Hovsjö N	1,601	926	58.3	38.1	52	7	93	10,065	27
32 Hovsjö S	1,911	969	52.7	44.4	60	7	93	15,504	27
33 Hovsjö-Tveta	2,432	1,505	39.7	58.4	66	23	77	19,871	31
35 Enhörna-Ekeby	1,565	1,156	40.0	59.6	86	69	31	29,901	35
36 Enhörna V	1,652	1,241	42.1	57.1	87	84	16	32,554	37
40 Vårdinge	2,207	1,571	52.8	45.7	79	78	22	27,448	38
41 Järna C	2,353	1,740	52.7	45.5	82	77	23	27,241	41
42 Järna N	1,851	1,104	58.4	37.0	70	61	39	22,304	32
43 Järna V	1,819	1,367	52.1	46.0	80	78	22	26,116	36
44 Järna-Kallfors	1,815	1,191	34.4	64.5	90	74	26	37,120	48
45 Järna landsbygd	2,237	1,632	52.0	44.6	78	72	28	26,583	43
47 Hölö V	2,601	1,760	42.5	56.5	86	75	25	29,859	33
48 Hölö-Mörkö	1,350	1,012	56.3	41.1	82	80	20	27,850	44
50 Geneta S	1,567	1,197	33.6	65.0	74	26	74	22,111	28
51 Geneta N	2,353	1,273	47.3	50.9	56	9	91	13,812	25
52 Bårstafältet	1,858	1,152	40.5	57.6	59	17	83	16,045	30
53 Ronna S	2,180	1,391	38.8	59.8	58	10	90	14,792	26
54 Ronna V	2,355	1,249	47.7	50.4	61	9	91	16,000	28
55 Ronna N	2,092	942	53.6	42.9	54	4	96	11,974	27
56 Ronna-Karlhov	2,238	1,419	41.8	56.1	67	23	77	19,824	30
57 Lina V	1,854	1,224	42.8	55.2	71	19	81	20,801	31
58 Lina Ö	1,741	1,257	34.2	64.6	74	29	71	22,435	35
Source: SVT

=== Population development ===
Population development in Södertälje Municipality 1970–2019
Year	Population
1970	75,751
1975	77,695
1980	80,045
1985	79,764
1990	81,786
1995	82,355
2000	77,882
2005	80,553
2010	86,246
2015	93,202
2017	96,032
2019	98,979
Source: SCB - Folkmängd efter region och år.

== Localities ==
- Gnesta (minor part of)
- Hölö
- Järna
- Mölnbo
- Södertälje (seat)

== Elections ==
=== Riksdag ===
These are the local results of the Riksdag elections since the 1972 municipality reform. The results of the Sweden Democrats were not published by SCB between 1988 and 1998 at a municipal level to the party's small nationwide size at the time. "Votes" denotes valid votes, whereas "Turnout" denotes also blank and invalid votes.

Year	Turnout	Votes	V	S	MP	C	L	KD	M	SD	ND
1973	90.2	42,332	6.5	46.0	0.0	23.2	8.1	1.5	13.9	0.0	0.0
1976	90.9	43,826	5.5	44.4	0.0	22.2	10.4	1.0	15.9	0.0	0.0
1979	89.5	43,789	6.6	46.5	0.0	14.8	10.1	1.2	19.9	0.0	0.0
1982	90.4	45,372	6.5	49.2	2.3	11.5	4.8	1.3	24.0	0.0	0.0
1985	88.8	46,230	6.3	47.1	1.9	7.1	15.6	0.0	21.0	0.0	0.0
1988	83.0	44,563	6.8	43.7	6.5	7.7	14.0	1.8	18.3	0.0	0.0
1991	83.9	45,204	4.3	40.3	4.1	5.3	9.6	5.0	22.9	0.0	7.9
1994	84.6	46,151	5.5	49.2	5.9	4.5	7.1	3.1	22.8	0.0	1.1
1998	77.2	39,428	10.3	41.4	5.4	3.4	3.9	10.3	22.5	0.0	0.0
2002	76.1	40,914	7.5	42.2	5.9	3.3	12.9	9.6	14.4	0.7	0.0
2006	77.5	42,920	5.6	36.0	6.4	5.4	7.2	7.2	26.8	1.9	0.0
2010	79.5	45,458	5.2	34.0	8.3	3.9	6.2	5.4	29.5	5.6	0.0
2014	77.9	47,151	5.8	32.0	7.3	3.8	4.7	6.9	23.1	12.4	0.0

Blocs

This lists the relative strength of the socialist and centre-right blocs since 1973, but parties not elected to the Riksdag are inserted as "other", including the Sweden Democrats results from 1988 to 2006, but also the Christian Democrats pre-1991 and the Greens in 1982, 1985 and 1991. The sources are identical to the table above. The coalition or government mandate marked in bold formed the government after the election. New Democracy got elected in 1991 but are still listed as "other" due to the short lifespan of the party. "Elected" is the total number of percentage points from the municipality that went to parties who were elected to the Riksdag.

Year	Turnout	Votes	Left	Right	SD	Other	Elected
1973	90.2	42,332	**52.5**	45.2	0.0	2.3	97.7
1976	90.9	43,826	49.9	**48.5**	0.0	1.6	98.4
1979	89.5	43,789	53.1	**44.8**	0.0	2.1	97.9
1982	90.4	45,372	**55.7**	40.3	0.0	4.0	96.0
1985	88.8	46,230	**53.4**	43.7	0.0	2.9	97.1
1988	83.0	44,563	**57.0**	40.0	0.0	3.0	97.0
1991	83.9	45,204	44.6	**42.8**	0.0	12.6	95.3
1994	84.6	46,151	**60.6**	37.5	0.0	1.9	98.1
1998	77.2	39,428	**57.1**	40.1	0.0	2.8	97.2
2002	76.1	40,914	**55.6**	40.2	0.0	4.2	95.8
2006	77.5	42,920	48.0	**46.6**	0.0	5.4	94.6
2010	79.5	45,458	47.5	**45.0**	5.6	1.9	98.1
2014	77.9	47,151	**45.1**	38.5	12.4	4.0	96.0

== Notable people ==
- Björn Borg, former tennis player
- Johan Edlund, singer and leader of the bands Tiamat and Lucyfire
- Tom Wandell, NHL Player

== International relations ==
The municipality is twinned with:

- Struer Municipality, Denmark
- Pärnu, Estonia
- Forssa, Finland
- Angers, France
- Sarpsborg, Norway
