= Hillersjö stone =

Runestone in Sweden

Coordinates: 59°23′17″N 17°42′18″E

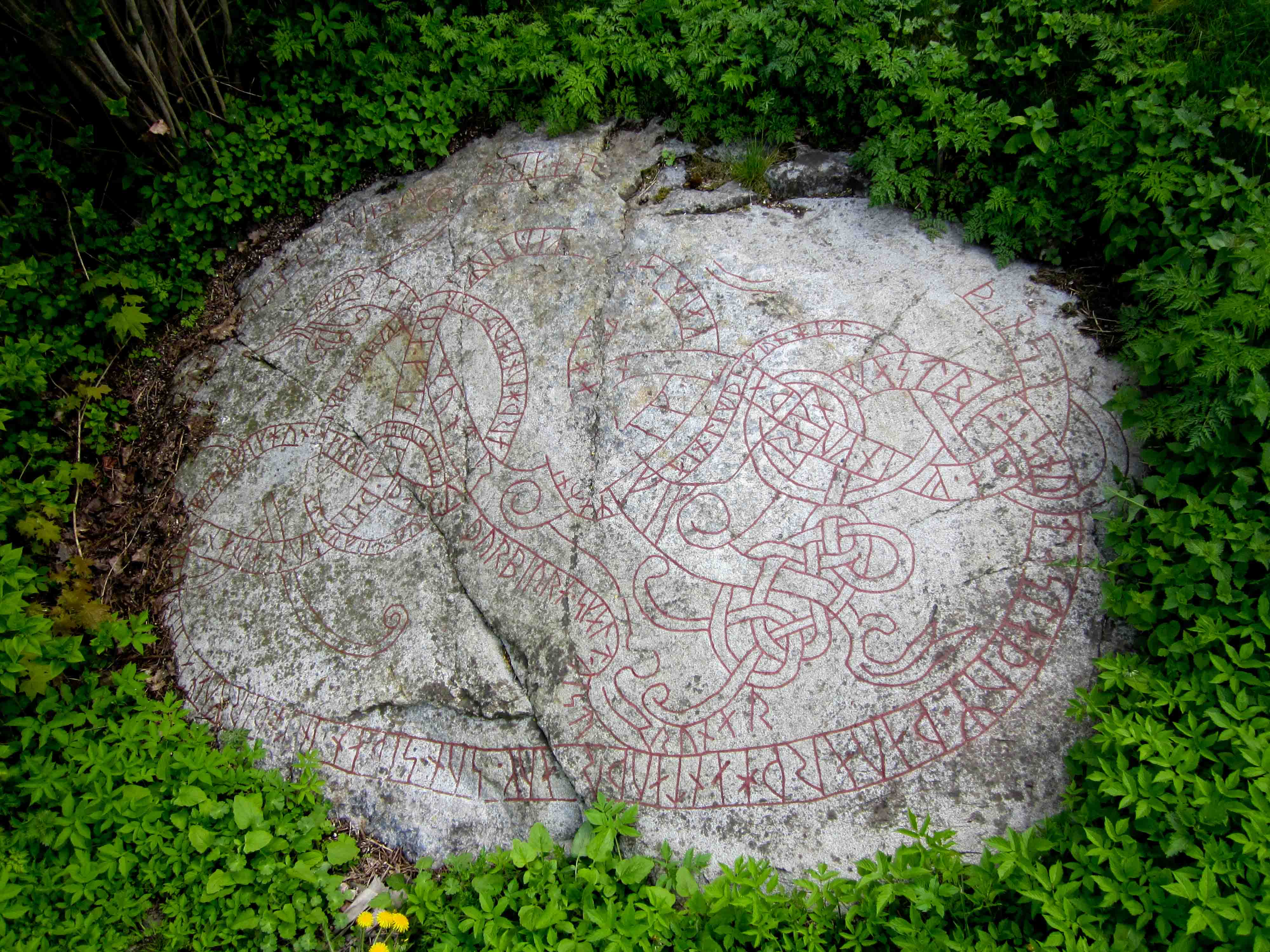
- Created: 11th century
- Discovered: Hilleshög, Uppland, Sweden
- Rundata ID: U 29
- Style: Pr4
- Runemaster: Þorbjörn skald

Text – Native
- Old Norse :See article

Translation
- See article

The Hillersjö stone, listed in the Rundata catalog as U 29 and located at Hillersjö, which is about four kilometers north of Stenhamra on Färingsö, is a runic Younger Futhark inscription that tells, in Old Norse, the tragic real life family saga of Gerlög and her daughter Inga. It is the longest runic inscription in Uppland and the second longest one in Sweden after the Rök runestone.

== Description ==
The inscription on the Hillersjö stone, which is 2.8 by 1.0 meters, consists of runic text in the younger futhark that is carved on an intertwined serpent. The main text is written on the serpent with extraneous information, such as the fact that "Þorbjôrn Skald carved the runes," carved outside of the serpent. The inscription is classified as being carved in runestone style Pr4, which is also known as Urnes style. This runestone style is characterized by slim and stylized animals that are interwoven into tight patterns. The animal heads are typically seen in profile with slender almond-shaped eyes and upwardly curled appendages on the noses and the necks.

The runic text indicates that Gerlög married with Germund when she was very young, and they had a son who is not named. Germund drowned and the son died. Then Gerlög remarried with Gudrik and they had several children, but only one survived, who was named Inga. Inga married Ragnfast of Snottsta and they had a son who is not named. Both Ragnfast and the son died and so Inga inherited the estate Snottsta. Inga then married Eric, but both soon died without leaving any children. This meant that Gerlög inherited her daughter's property. It has been noted that the chain of inheritance documented on the Hillersjö stone, including how property passed to women through their children, is consistent with the inheritance rules later codified in the 1296 Uppland Law.

This text is completed with information from runestone U 20/U 21, where it is said that both Gudrik (Gerlög's second husband and Inga's father) and Eric (Inga's second husband) had died.

The estate Snottsta (also spelled Snåttsta) still exists. At Snottsta and the neighboring Vreta there are several other runestones that complete the saga of Inga that are called the Snottsta and Vreta stones.

The runic text begins with the imperative Rað þu! which is translated as "Interpret!" Other runestones with similar imperitive exclamations in their runic texts include U 328 in Stora Lundby and Sö 158 in Österberga. On the Hillersjö stone, Rað þu! is carved on the eye of the serpent, perhaps indicating that the stone as a record of inheritance was intended for the public.

The inscription is signed by the runemaster Þorbjôrn Skald, who also signed the runestone U 532 at Roslags-Bro. Other inscriptions have been attributed to him, including several stones signed only with "Þorbjôrn." He was likely selected as the runemaster for his composition of the Hillersjö stone's text in alliterative verse known as höjningar, a traditional style which uses half-lines characterized by two stressed and accented or rising syllables.

The Stockholm County Museum presents the story of Gerlög and Inga as a dramatic real life family saga which was documented for posterity on this runestone sometime between 1060 and 1100. Local theater associations nearby have conducted plays which recreate the rather dramatic tale of Gerlög.

== Inscription ==
raþ| |þu kaiʀmuntr -ik * kaiʀ[l]a[uk *] (m)aytumi| |i þa * finku * þau sun * aþ han * truknaþi * in sun to : siþan : þa + fi(k) (h)(u)- --þrik * ha- ... (þ)(i)nsa * þa * finku þa(u) [bar](n) ... (i)(n) maʀ ain lifþi * [hu]n hit ' ...g[a] ' h(a)... fik raknfastr * i * snutastaþum * þa uarþ han tauþr * auk * sun * siþan * in * moþir kuam + at sunar ' arfi ' þa ' fik hun ' airik ' þar ' uarþ hun tauþ ' þar kuam ' gaiʀlauk at arfi ' inku tutur sinar þurbiur(n) ' skalt ' risti runar
Rað þu! Gæiʀmundr [f]ikk {} Gæiʀlaug {} møydomi i. Þa {} fingu {} þau sun, {} aðan hann {} drunknaði. {} En sunn do {} siðan. {} Þa {} fikk ho[n] [Gu]ðrik. {} Ha[nn] ... þennsa. {} Þa {} fingu þau barn. {} En maʀ æin lifði; {} hon het {} [In]ga. {} Ha[na] fikk Ragnfastr {} i {} Snutastaðum. {} Þa varð hann dauðr {} ok {} sunn {} siðan. {} En {} moðiʀ kvam {} at sunaʀ {} arfi. {} Þa {} fikk hon {} Æirik. {} Þar {} varð hon dauð. {} Þar kvam {} Gæiʀlaug at arfi {} Ingu, dottur sinnaʀ. Þorbiorn {} Skald {} risti runaʀ.
Interpret! Geirmundr got Geirlaug (to wife) in her maidenhood. Then they got a son, before he (= Geirmundr) drowned. And then the son died. Then she got Guðríkr. He ... this. Then they got children. And one maid lived; she was called Inga. Ragnfastr of Snutastaðir got her (to wife). Then he died, and thereafter the son. And the mother came to inherit from her son. Then she got Eiríkr. Then she died. Then Geirlaug came to inherit from Inga, her daughter. Þorbjôrn Skald carved the runes.

== Gallery ==
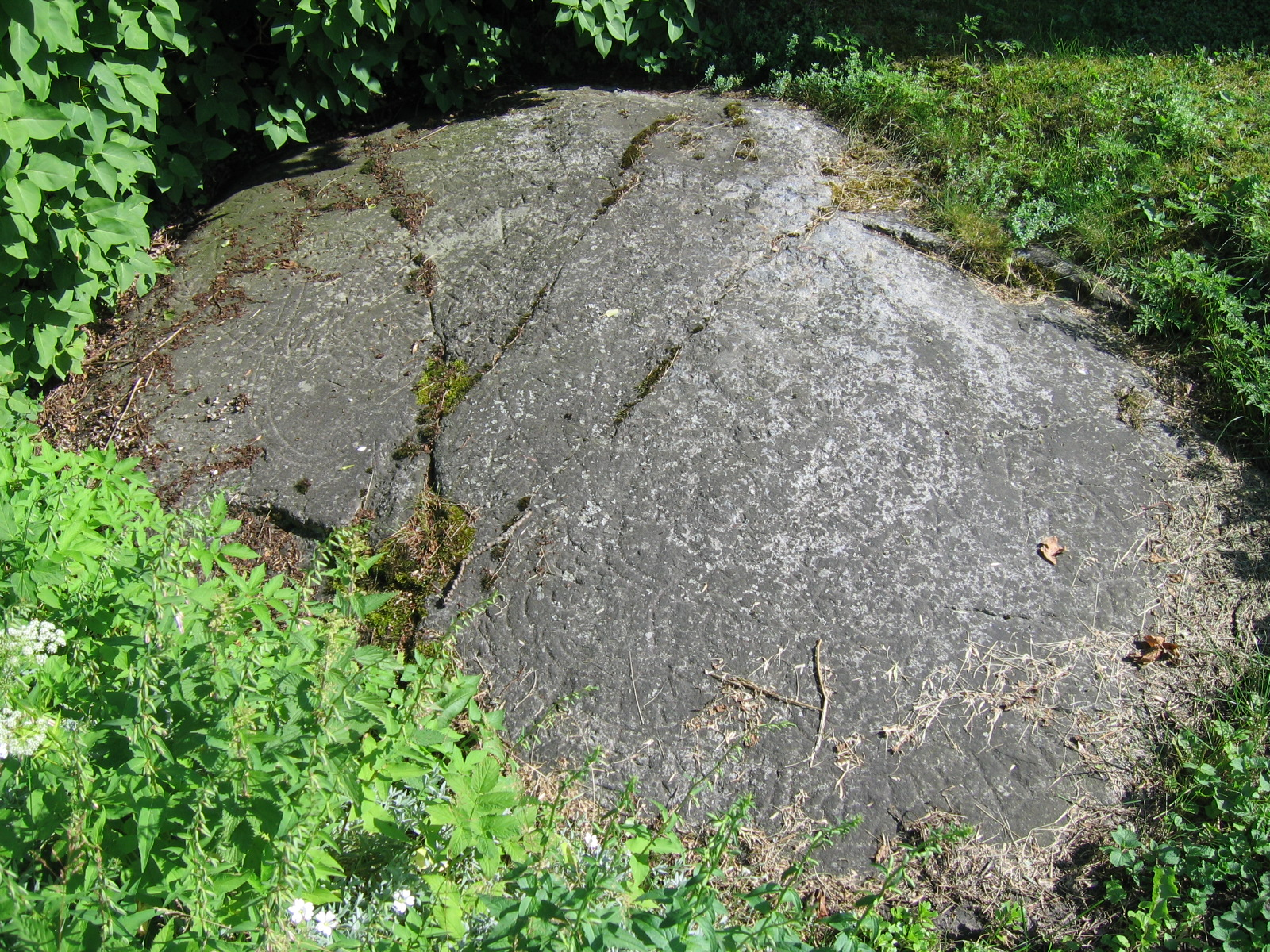
In the summer of 2007, the U 29 inscription no longer had any visible paint and was partly overgrown.

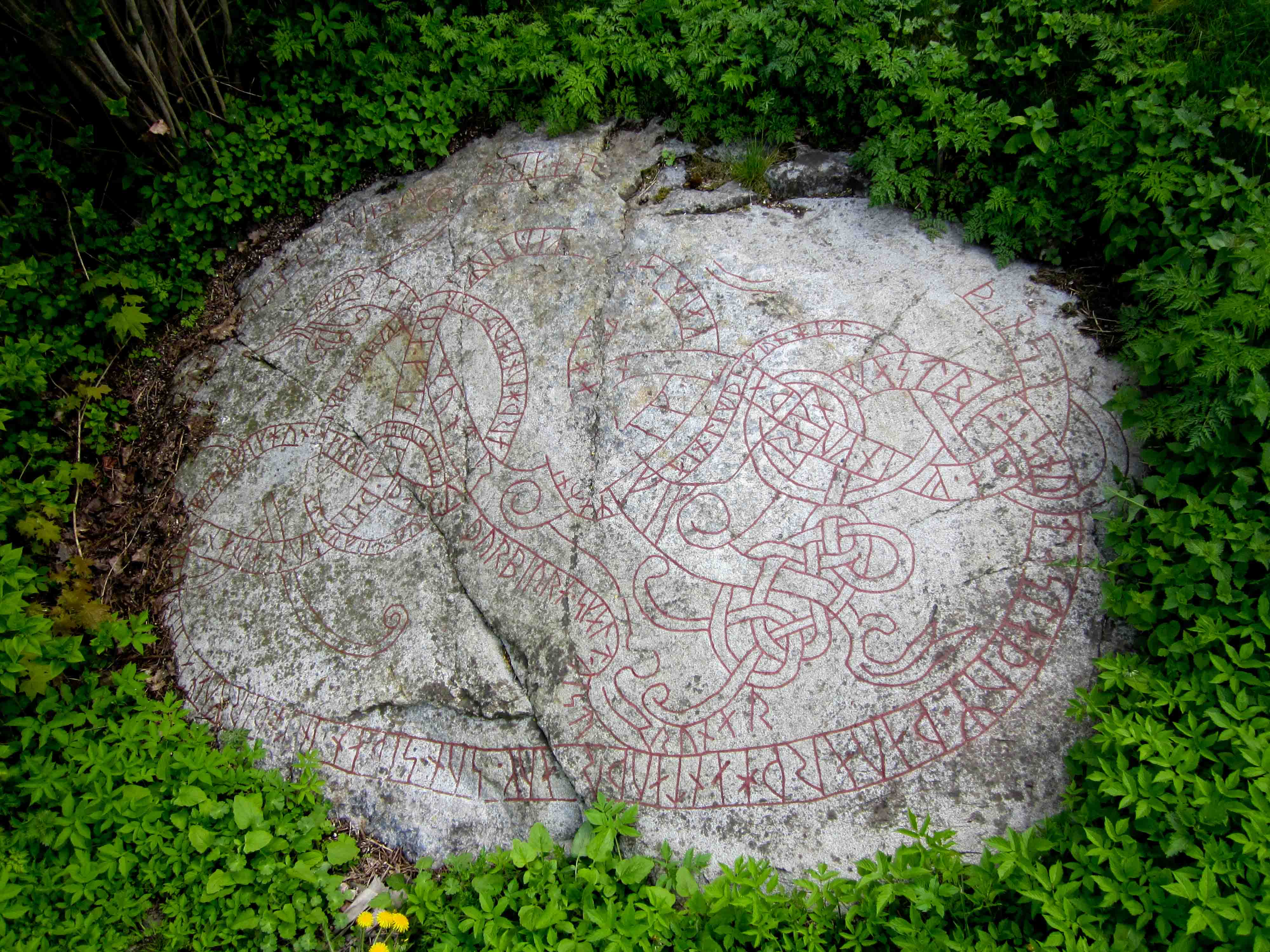
Later, in 2010/2010, the inscription was restored and the runes is yet again visible.

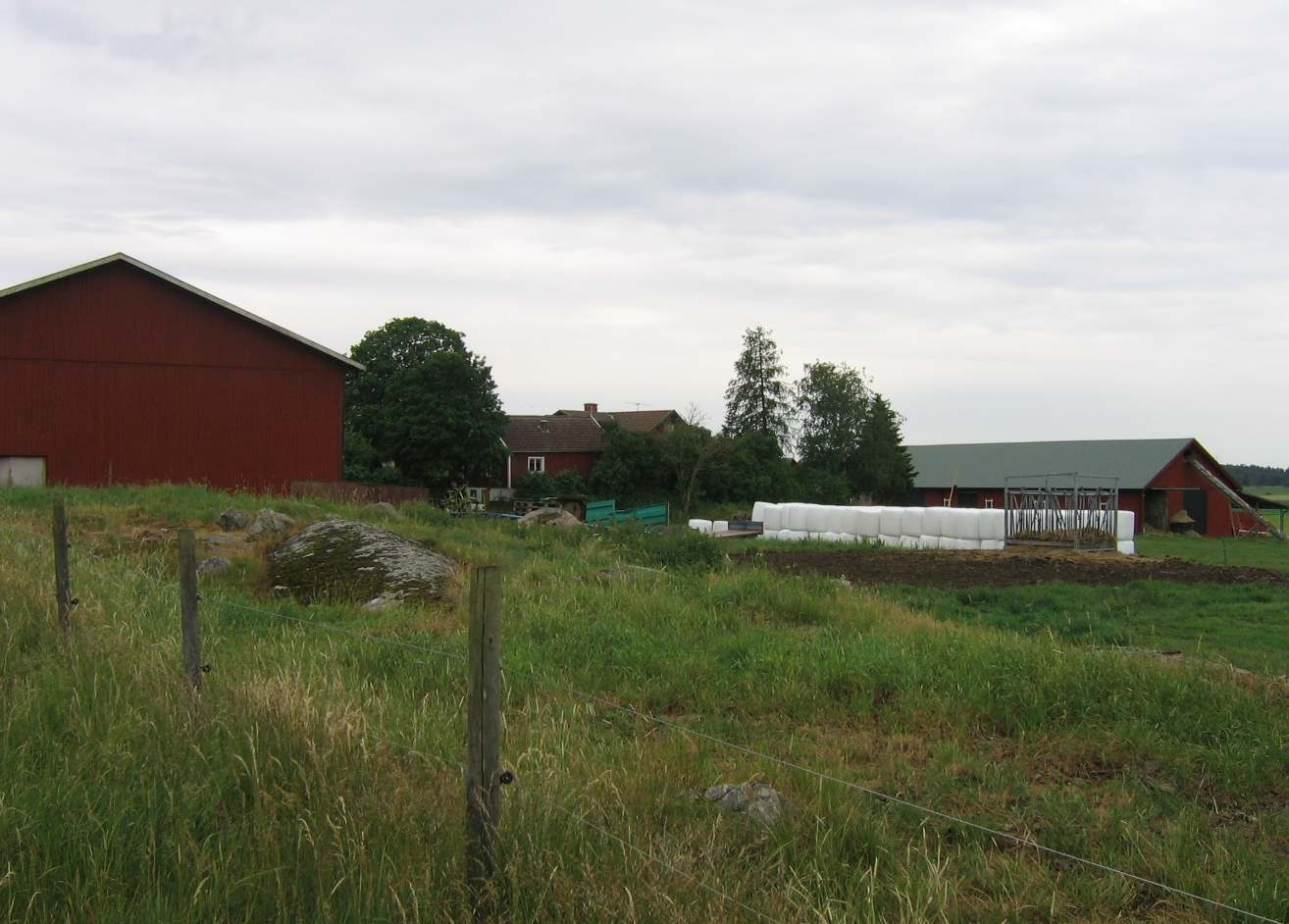
The farm Snottsta or Snåttsta, Old Norse: Snotastaðir, is still in the same location after 1000 years.

== See also ==
- List of runestones
