= Karlskär =

- Smaller locality
- Interactive map of Karlskär
- Coordinates: 59°25′10″N 17°39′32″E
- Country: Sweden
- County: Stockholm County
- Municipality: Ekerö Municipality
- Time zone: UTC+1 (CET)
  - Summer (DST): UTC+2 (CEST)

Karlskär is a village (smaller locality) on the Lake Mälaren island of Färingsö, Ekerö Municipality, Stockholm County, Sweden.
