= Lilla Stenby =

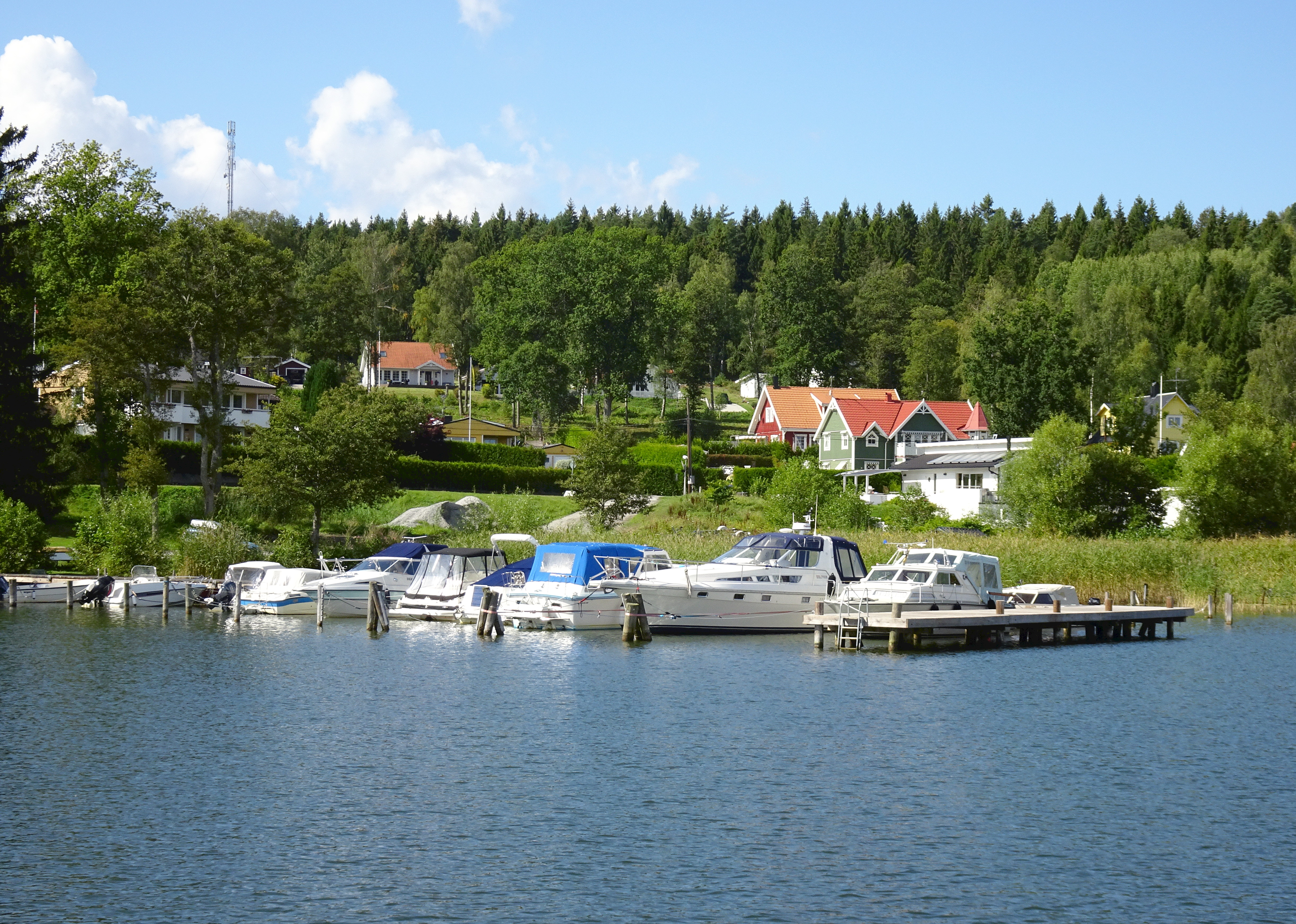

- Location within Stockholm Location within Sweden
- Coordinates: 59°23′N 17°31′E
- Country: Sweden
- Province: Uppland
- County: Stockholm County
- Municipality: Ekerö Municipality

Area
  - Total: 0.25 km^{2} (0.097 sq mi)

Population (31 December 2020)
  - Total: 250
  - Density: 1,000/km^{2} (2,600/sq mi)
- Time zone: UTC+1 (CET)
  - Summer (DST): UTC+2 (CEST)

Lilla Stenby is a locality situated in Ekerö Municipality, Stockholm County, Sweden with 244 inhabitants in 2010.
