= Svartsjö =

Coordinates: 59.3628°N 17.7278°E

- smaller locality
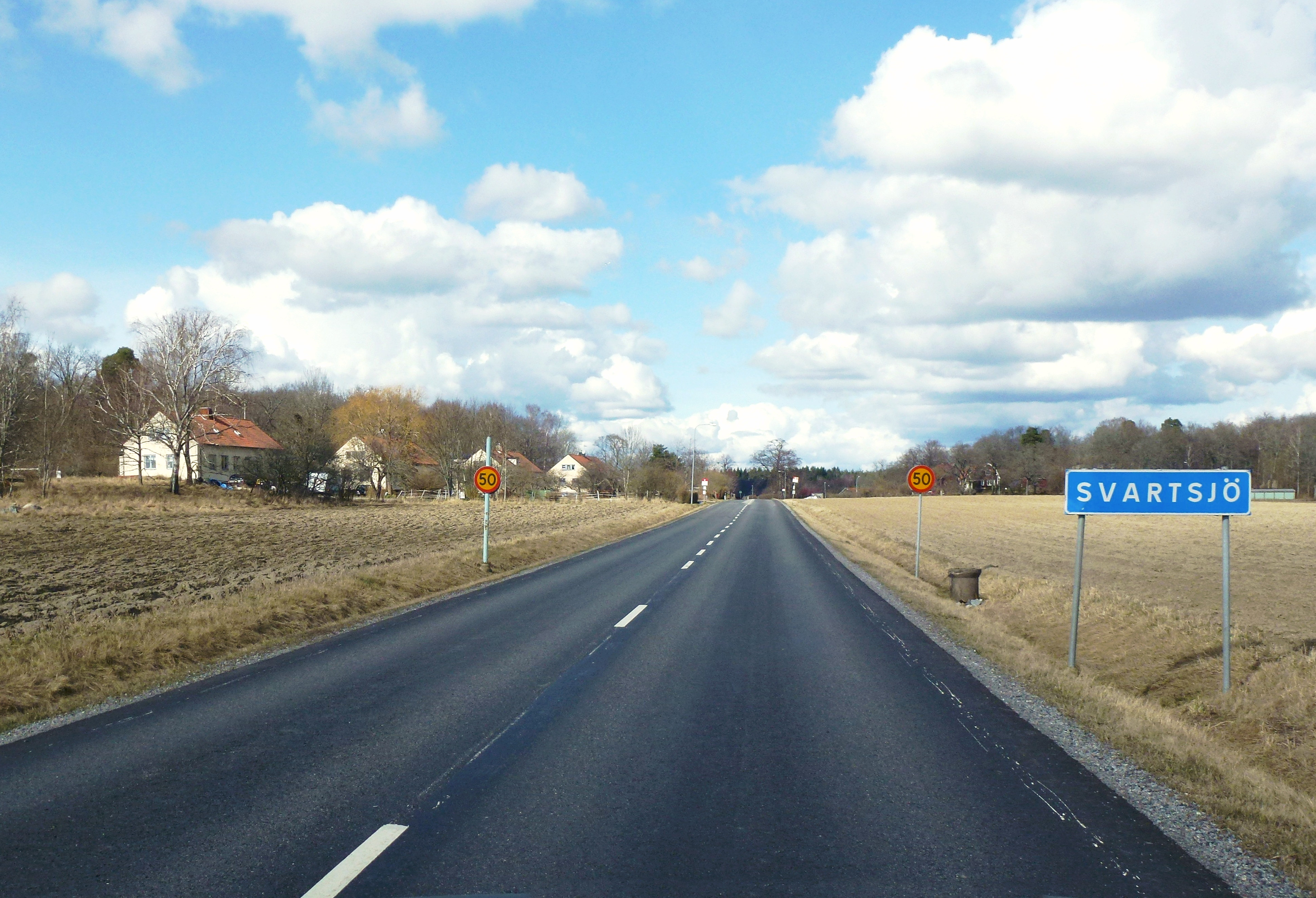
- Interactive map of Svartsjö
- Country: Sweden
- County: Stockholm County
- Municipality: Ekerö Municipality
- Time zone: UTC+1 (CET)
  - Summer (DST): UTC+2 (CEST)

Svartsjö is a smaller locality in Ekerö Municipality, Stockholm County, southeastern Sweden.

== See also ==
- Svartsjö Palace
- Svartsjö County
