= Färjstaden, Ekerö Municipality =

Färjstaden, Ekerö kommun
- Smaller locality
- Interactive map of Färjstaden, Ekerö kommun
- Coordinates: 59°22′37″N 17°46′3″E
- Country: Sweden
- County: Stockholm County
- Municipality: Ekerö Municipality
- Time zone: UTC+1 (CET)
  - Summer (DST): UTC+2 (CEST)

Färjstaden, Ekerö kommun is a village (smaller locality) in Ekerö Municipality, Stockholm County, southeastern Sweden.
