= Ilända =

- Smaller locality
- Interactive map of Ilända
- Coordinates: 59°24′28″N 17°40′53″E
- Country: Sweden
- County: Stockholm County
- Municipality: Ekerö Municipality
- Time zone: UTC+1 (CET)
  - Summer (DST): UTC+2 (CEST)

Ilända is a village (smaller locality) in Ekerö Municipality, Stockholm County, southeastern Sweden.
