= Daniel Salthenius =

Swedish-born German theologian (1701–1750)

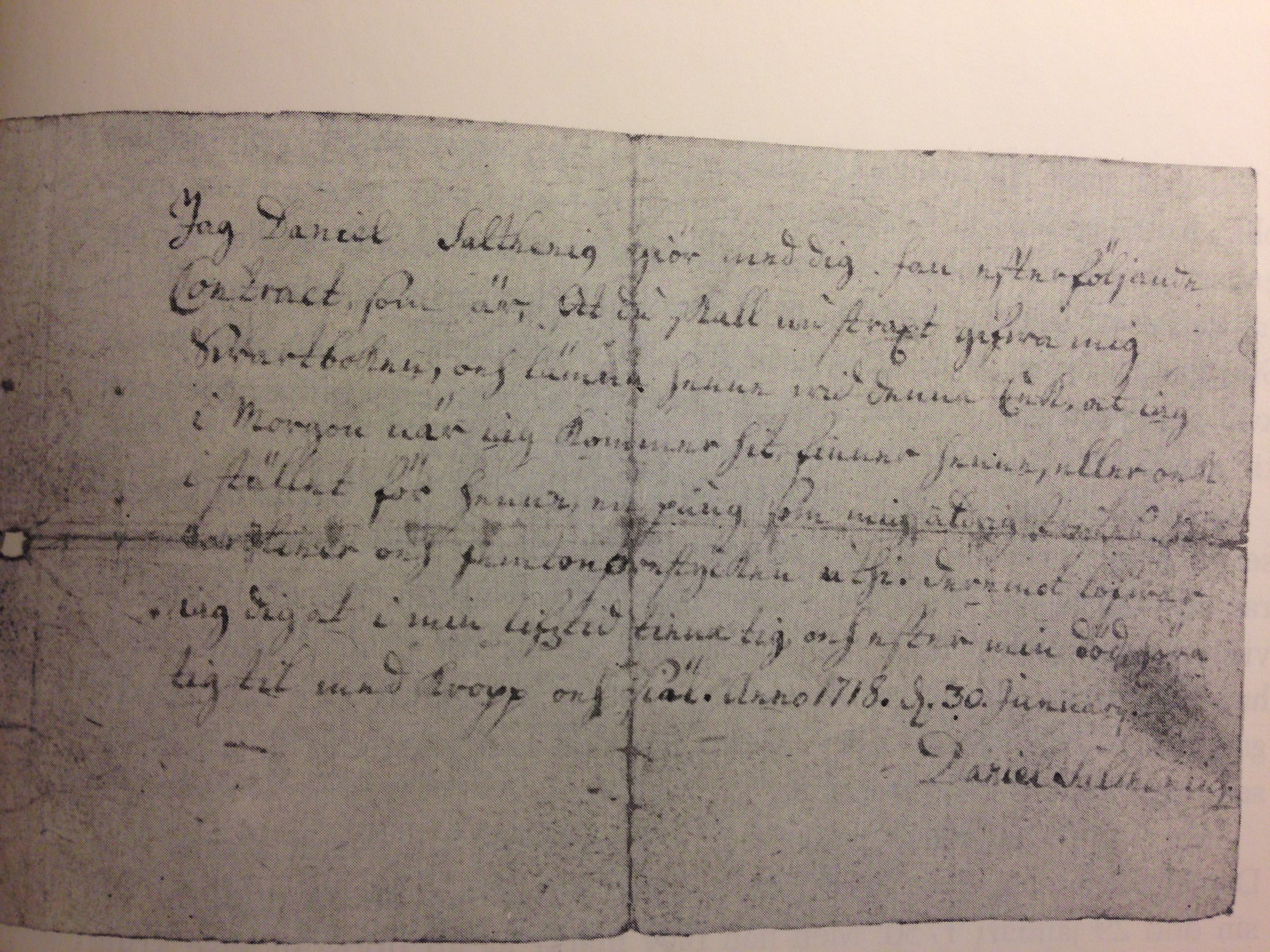
Daniel Salthenius' contract

Daniel Lorenz Salthenius (March 16, 1701 – January 29, 1750) was a professor of theology at the University of Königsberg from 1732 until his death. He is particularly remembered for a 1737 scandal in which it was revealed he had offered his soul to the devil as a student in Sweden, as well as for owning the largest private library in Prussia during his time.

== Early life and education ==
Salthenius was born on March 16, 1701, in Markim between Stockholm and Uppsala in Sweden, the son of a pastor. He studied theology at the university at Uppsala University, but was accused of making a deal with the Devil and was condemned to death, so he escaped Sweden with his professors' help.

He later continued his studies at the University of Halle, beginning 1724, and became a noted Pietist. At Halle, he began to teach at an orphanage. He became inspector of the orphanage and its associated schools by the time he graduated as magister in 1729.

== Career ==
After his time at Halle, Salthenius next became an inspector of the orphanage at Königsberg, then inspector of the Collegium Fridericianum. He was appointed professor of theology at the University of Königsberg in 1732 to help the Pietist cause there.

In 1937, Salthenius's orthodox Lutheran opponents accused him of having made a pact with the Devil when he was a student in Uppsala. He had written a letter in his own blood, asking the Devil to provide him with a bottomless bag of money in exchange for his body and soul, and placed the letter under an oak tree, where it was found by a farmer who notified the authorities. However, Salthenius was not dismissed from the university and remained a full professor. The letter is today kept at Uppsala University library.

He remained a professor of theology until his death on January 29, 1750. He was remembered for maintaining the largest private library in Prussia at the time, including 22,000 volumes among which were 300 Bibles.
