= Vifärna =

Coordinates: 59°42′N 17°27′E

- Smaller locality
- Interactive map of Vifärna
- Country: Sweden
- County: Stockholm County
- Municipality: Ekerö Municipality
- Time zone: UTC+1 (CET)
  - Summer (DST): UTC+2 (CEST)

Vifärna is a village in Ekerö Municipality, Stockholm County, southeastern Sweden.
