= Sundby =

Sundby may refer to:

== Places ==
=== Denmark ===
- Sundby, Copenhagen, a district in Copenhagen
- Sundby, Lolland, a satellite town of Nykøbing Falster on Lolland
- Nørresundby, a town on North Jutlandic Island

=== Sweden ===
- Sundby, Sweden, a locality on Ekerö in Stockholm County
- Sundbyberg Municipality, Sweden

== People with the surname ==
- Martin Johnsrud Sundby, Norwegian cross-country skier
- Ragnhild Sundby (1922–2006), Norwegian zoologist
