= Lundkulla =

Coordinates: 59°21′42″N 17°30′27″E

- Smaller locality
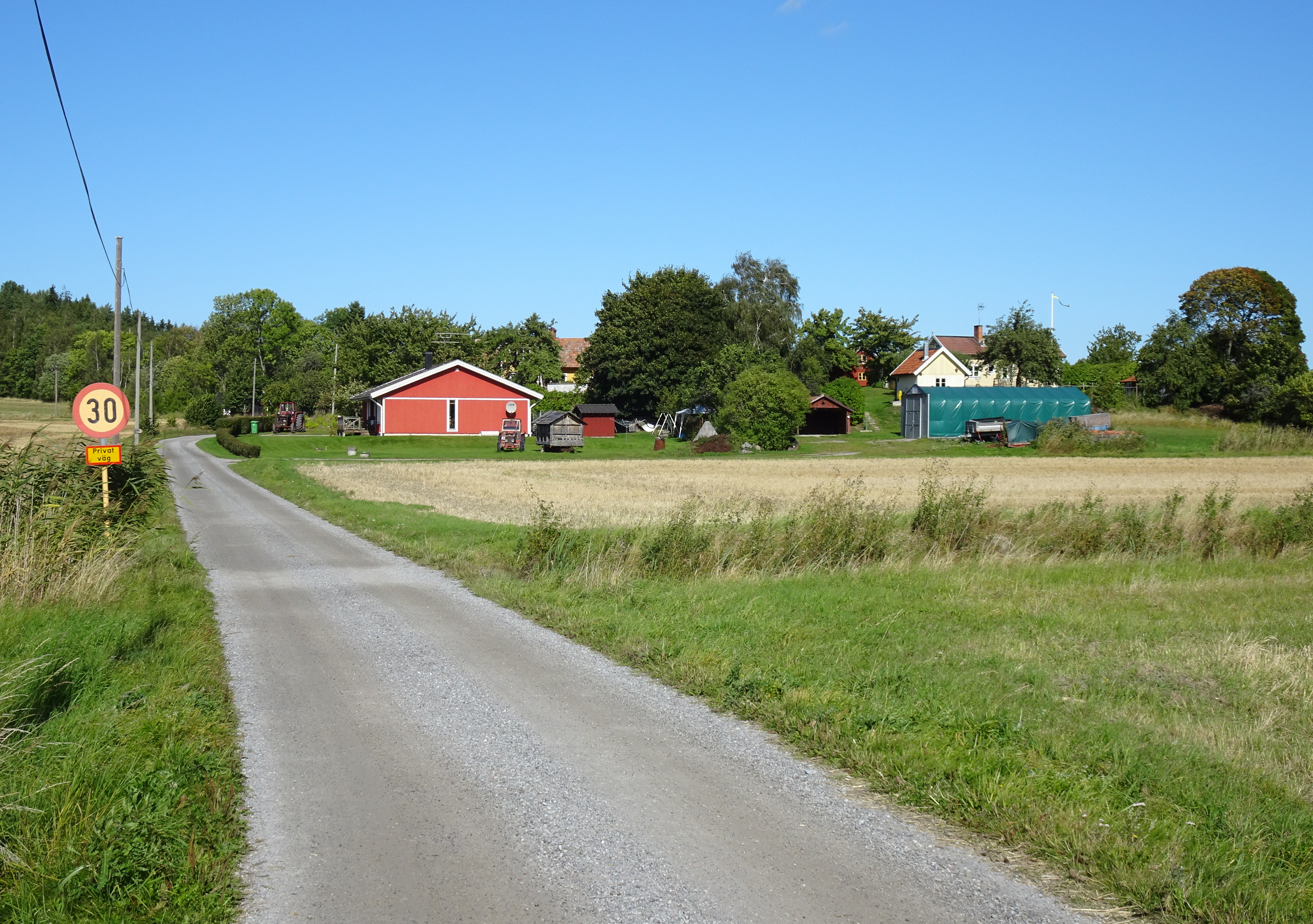
- Village road to Lundkulla
- Interactive map of Lundkulla
- Country: Sweden
- County: Stockholm County
- Municipality: Ekerö Municipality
- Time zone: UTC+1 (CET)
  - Summer (DST): UTC+2 (CEST)

Lundkulla is a village (smaller locality) in Ekerö Municipality, Stockholm County, southeastern Sweden.
