= Menhammar =

Coordinates: 59°19′27.59″N 17°38′22.99″E

- Smaller locality
- Interactive map of Menhammar
- Country: Sweden
- County: Stockholm County
- Municipality: Ekerö Municipality
- Time zone: UTC+1 (CET)
  - Summer (DST): UTC+2 (CEST)

Menhammar is a village (smaller locality) in Ekerö Municipality, Stockholm County, Sweden.

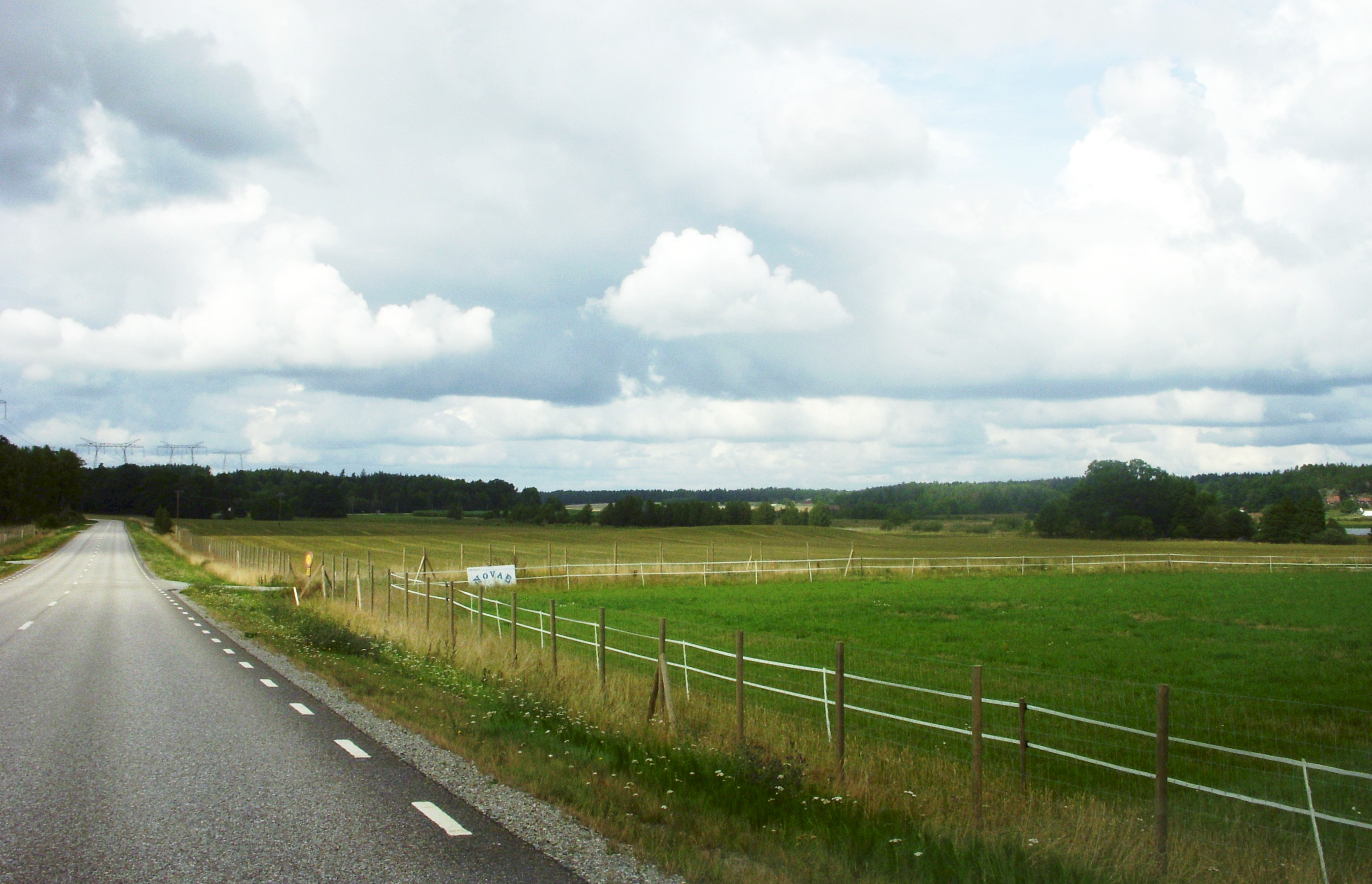
The Ekerö road at Menhammar.
