= Hilleshög Church =

Church building in Ekerö Municipality, Stockholm County, Sweden

Coordinates: 59°23′27″N 17°42′09″E

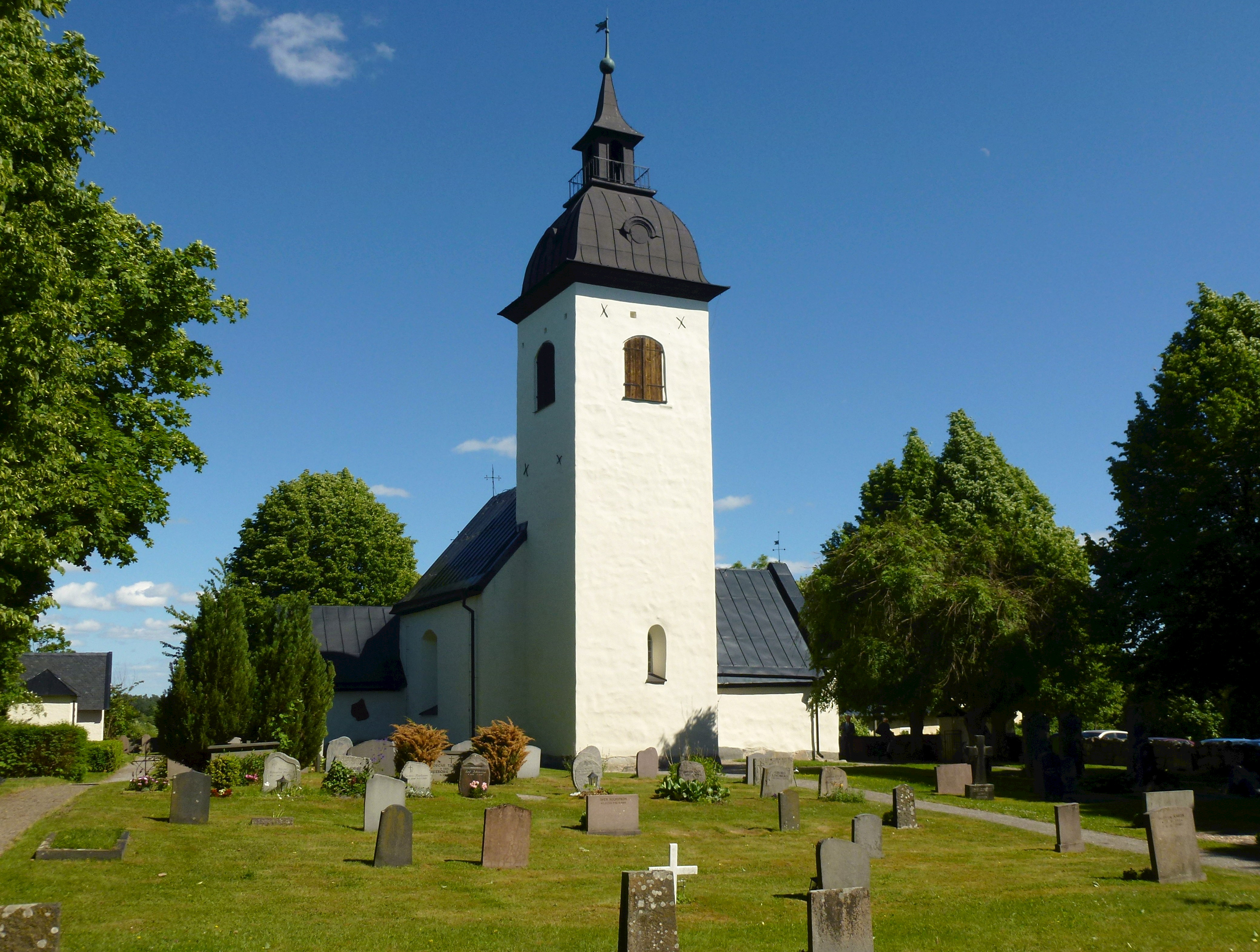
Hilleshög Church, external view

Hilleshög Church (Swedish: Hilleshögs kyrka) is a medieval Lutheran church in the Diocese of Stockholm. It is located in Hilleshög, Ekerö Municipality just outside Stockholm, Sweden. Hilleshög Church is one of the most well-preserved Romanesque churches in Stockholm County, together with Markim Church.

== History ==
The location of Hilleshög Church has probably been the centre of the local community since the Iron Age. Just south of the church lie three tumuli (the largest measuring 22 metres (72 ft) in diameter) and in the rock surface, a runic inscription. The runic inscription is the longest in Uppland.

Hilleshög Church was built in the third quarter of the 12th century. The original church consisted of nave, choir, apse and the western tower. The model for the church was probably the church of St. Per, in Sigtuna (now ruined). The floor plan of the church is still basically unchanged, and the church retains its original entrance. During the 13th century the interior of the church underwent some changes, including the decoration of the church with frescos. The sacristy was added in the late 14th or early 15th century, and a church porch was built in the 15th century. In the same century, the original frescos were painted over with new ones. Additional changes were made in the 18th century when the windows were enlarged and the tower received its presently visible spire. The church bells were transferred from a free-standing wooden bell tower to the western tower in 1785. In the same year the frescos were covered, and when they were laid bare again during a renovation in 1921-22 they were found to be in very poor condition.

== Architecture ==
The church is a hall church with a clearly distinguished choir, apse and tower. The church porch and sacristy have been added to the south and north of the church, respectively. The building material is fieldstone (with a few details made of brick), today covered with whitewash. Internally, the walls and ceiling are partially covered with frescos. The church is rich in furnishings: two triumphal crosses, from the 13th and 15th centuries; four carved wooden statues depicting Saint Martin, Saint Bridget of Sweden, an unknown bishop and a Madonna, all medieval; a processional cross from the 14th century and a decorative altar-cloth, made in Lübeck in the 1490s. The door to the sacristy is furthermore medieval, made of wood and reinforced with iron. Other furnishings are later, so for example the pulpit (1748) and the organ, which was bought by the church in 1773 but which probably earlier belonged to a private residence. It is encased in a Rococo case, with decorations made in papier mâché. It is quite possibly the smallest church organ in Sweden, and was renovated in 1961
