= Lindby, Adelsö =

Coordinates: 59°20′30.98″N 17°31′37.13″E

- Smaller locality
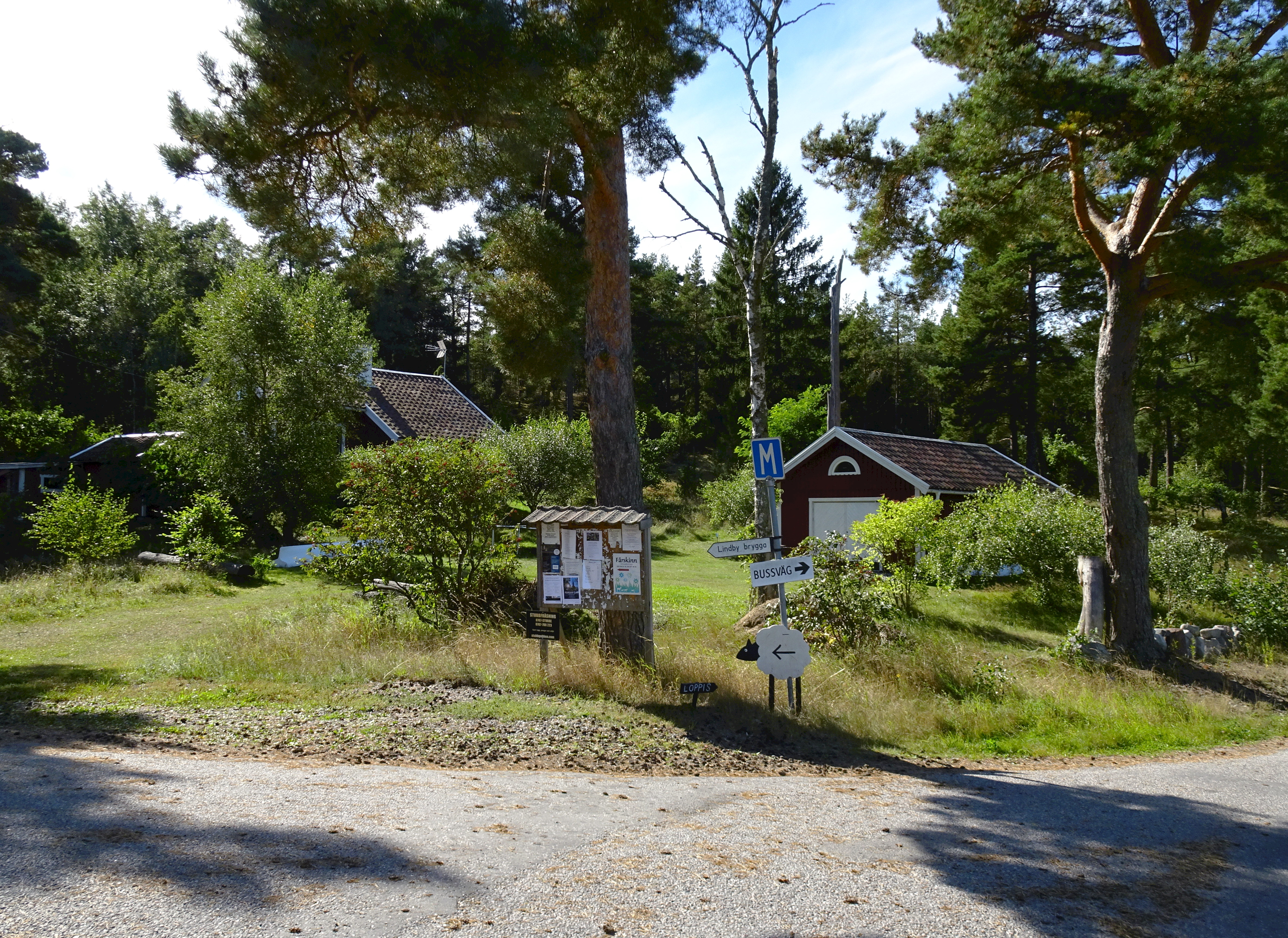
- Lindby, Adelsö
- Interactive map of Lindby, Adelsö
- Country: Sweden
- County: Stockholm County
- Municipality: Ekerö Municipality
- Time zone: UTC+1 (CET)
  - Summer (DST): UTC+2 (CEST)

Lindby, Adelsö is a village (smaller locality) in Ekerö Municipality, Stockholm County, southeastern Sweden.
