= Drottningholm =

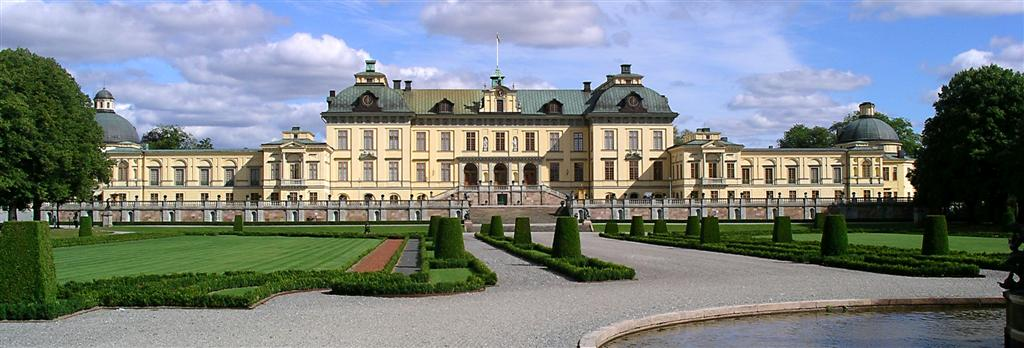
- Drottningholm Palace

- Location within Stockholm Location within Sweden Location within European Union
- Coordinates: 59°19′29″N 17°53′20″E
- Country: Sweden
- Province: Uppland
- County: Stockholm County
- Municipality: Ekerö Municipality

Area
  - Total: 1.47 km^{2} (0.57 sq mi)

Population (31 December 2020)
  - Total: 316
  - Density: 215/km^{2} (557/sq mi)
- Time zone: UTC+1 (CET)
  - Summer (DST): UTC+2 (CEST)

Drottningholm, literally "Queen's Islet", is a locality situated in Ekerö Municipality, Stockholm County, Sweden, with 398 inhabitants in 2010.

It is on the island Lovön in lake Mälaren on the outskirts of Stockholm. Drottningholm Palace, the residence of the Swedish royal family since 1981, is here. The village was planned and built in the mid-18th century for the people working at the palace. It is a good example of how a Swedish village would have looked like in the 18th and 19th centuries, containing many picturesque houses and villas.

Drottningholm is accessible with public transport by taking the metro to Brommaplan, then an Ekerö-bound SL bus.

== Ships ==
At least two ships have been named Drottningholm. One is the former ferry Drottningholm that was built in 1909 and is now a listed historic ship of Sweden. Another was the transatlantic ocean liner RMS Virginian, which Swedish American Line bought in 1920 and renamed Drottningholm.

Among English speakers, the liner's unfortunate tendency to roll inspired the nicknames "Rollingholm" or "Rollinghome". In the Second World War she was chartered to repatriate thousands of released prisoners of war, civilian internees and diplomats. Among them the English speakers nicknamed her "Trotting Home".

== See also ==
- Drottningholm Palace Theatre
