= Färentuna Runestones =

11th century runestones

Coordinates: 59°23′29″N 17°39′20″E

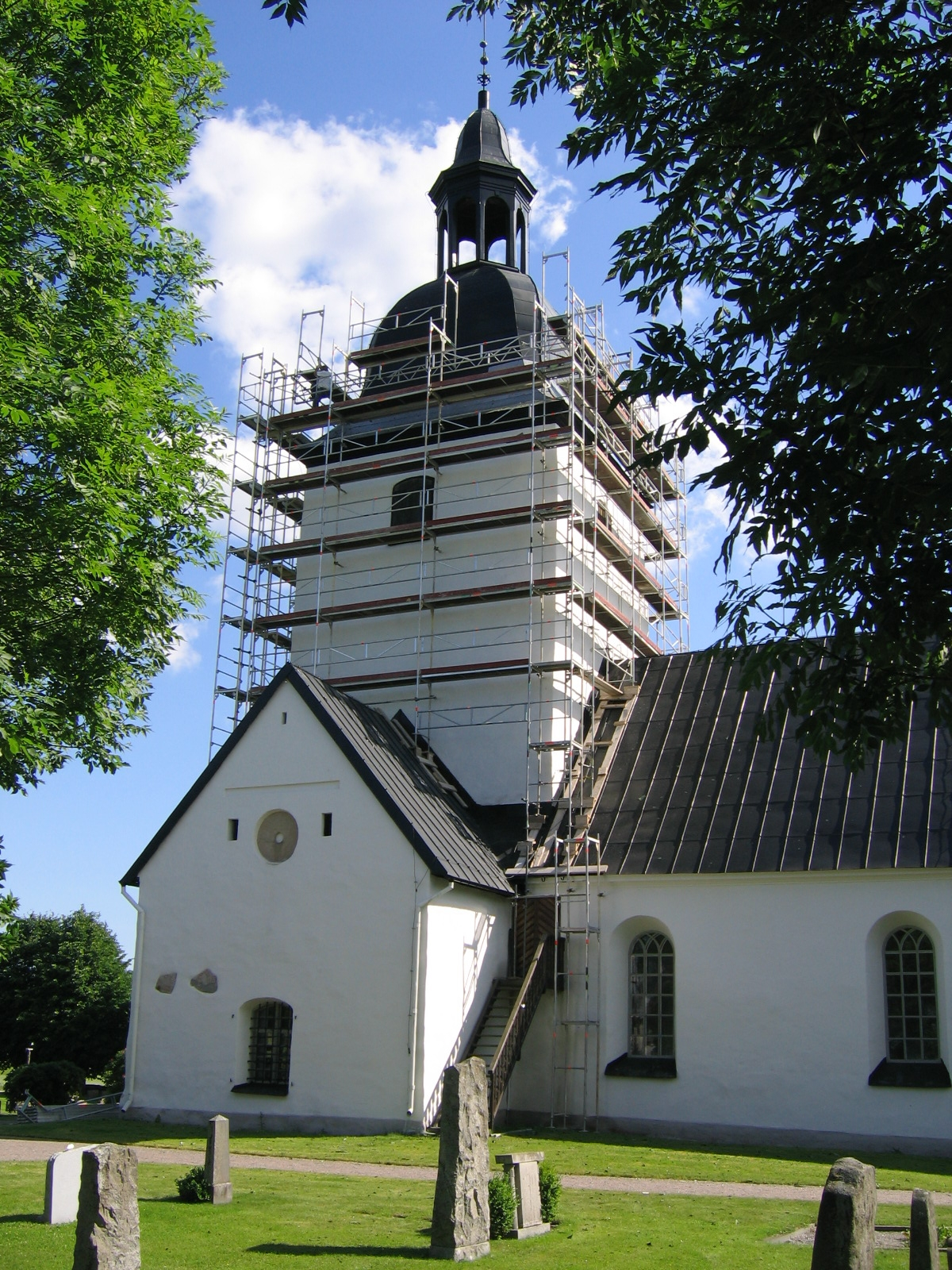
The church of Färentuna. The runestone fragments U 20 and U 21 can be seen in the church wall to the left of the front gate.

The Färentuna runestones are 11th century runestones labelled U 20, U 21, and U 22 in the Rundata catalog that are located in Färentuna, Uppland, Sweden. Runestones U 20 and U 21 were registered separately although they come from the same original runestone and consequently are called U 20/21. The runestone U 20/U 21 is probably most interesting as it, together with the Hillersjö stone and the Snottsta and Vreta stones, tells the story of the family of Gerlög and Inga. All of the Färentuna runestones are inscribed in the younger futhark.

== U 20/U 21 ==
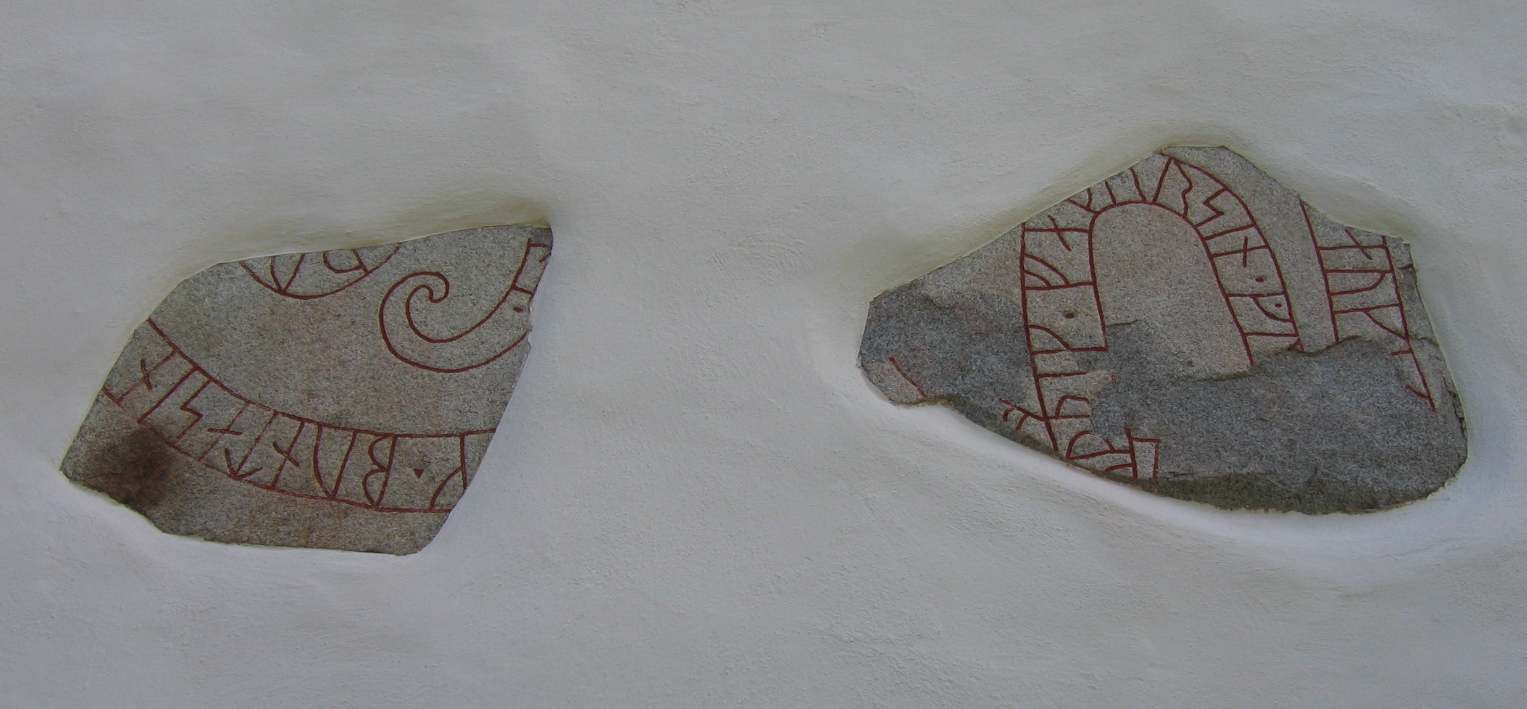
U 20 and U 21, which are found in the wall of the church of Färentuna.

The two fragments named U 20 and U 21 were originally part of the same runestone and were discovered under the plaster of a wall during the renovation of the church at Färentuna. It is likely that other fragments of this runestone may also be part of the church but have their inscriptions facing inwards. They are held to tell of the same family as the Hillersjö stone and the Snottsta and Vreta stones. This runestone is believed to have been raised by Inga in memory of her husband Eric (Eiríkr) and her father Godric (Guðríkr). The runestone has been attributed to the runemaster known as Torbjörn or Þorbjôrn Skald, who signed the Hillersjö stone.

... ...k * bunta sin ... auk -... ...(u)þrik * faþur sin * gu... ...-b... ...n- *
... [Æiri]k(?), {} bonda sinn ... ok ... [G]uðrik, {} faður sinn. {} Gu[ð hial]p[i a]n[d]. {}
... Eiríkr(?) his/her husbandman ... and ... Guðríkr, his/her father. May God help (his) spirit.

== U 22 ==
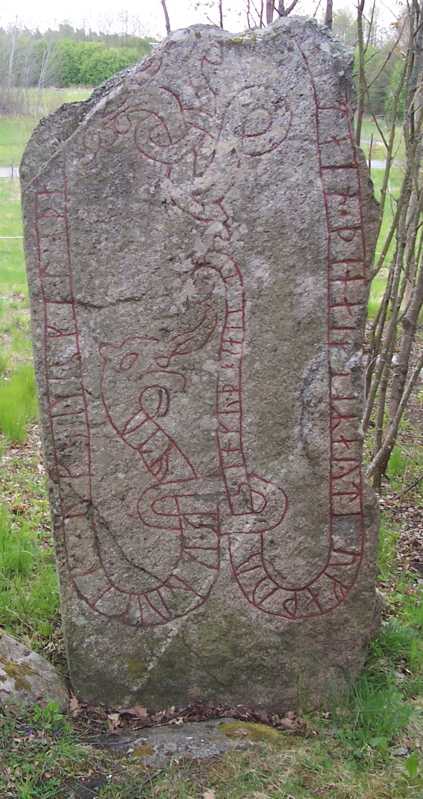
The runestone U 22.

The runic text of U 22 is within a serpent that circles the edge of the stone. This runestone is classified as being carved in either runestone style Pr2 or Pr3.

ulfr * uk uikil + uk syrkil * þa... ...- stain * þina i(f)(t)iʀ ayt--u faþur sin ku*þ (h)ia[lbi] a-t
Ulfʀ {} ok Vikell {} ok Syrkell/Sørkell {} þæ[iʀ] ... stæin {} þenna æftiʀ <ayt--u>, faður sinn. Guð hialpi a[n]d.
Ulfr and Vékell and Syrkell/Sørkell, they ... this stone in memory of ... their father. May God help (his) spirit.

== See also ==
- List of runestones

== Sources ==
- Svärdström, Elisabeth (1970). "Runfynd 1969" (PDF). Fornvännen. 65. Swedish National Heritage Board: 301–313.
- Inga och Estrid - en såpa för tusen år sedan: Människor, händelser och platser i Ingas och Estrids liv. A page at the Museum of Stockholm County.
