= Mälby =

Coordinates: 59°20′47.94″N 17°30′10.44″E

- Smaller locality
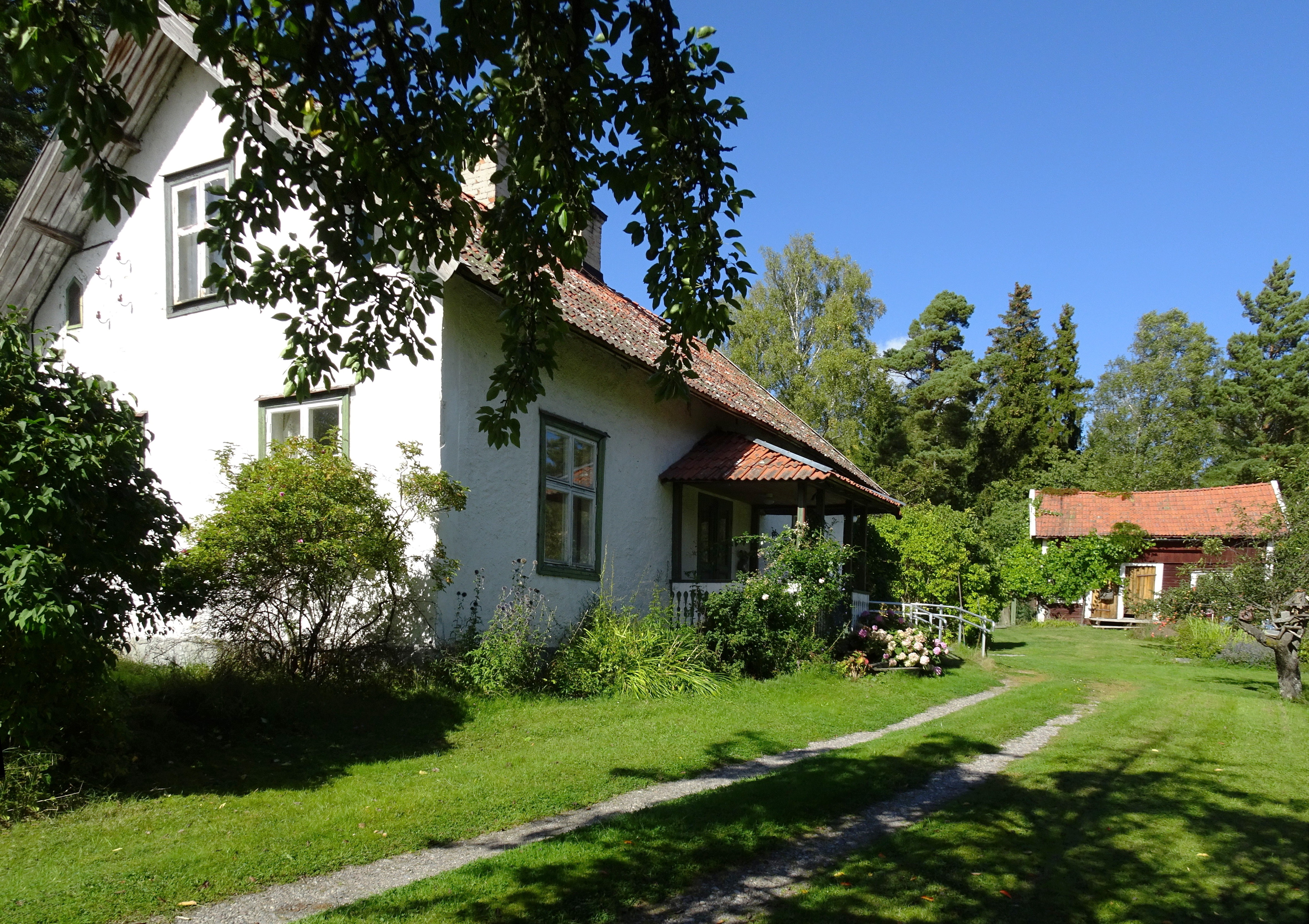
- A Farmstead in Mälby
- Interactive map of Mälby
- Country: Sweden
- County: Stockholm County
- Municipality: Ekerö Municipality
- Time zone: UTC+1 (CET)
  - Summer (DST): UTC+2 (CEST)

Mälby (Swedish pronunciation: [ˈmɛ̌ːlbʏ]) is a village (smaller locality) in Ekerö Municipality, Stockholm County, southeastern Sweden.
