= Sånga-Sundby =

Coordinates: 59°21′0″N 17°42′0″E

- Smaller locality
- Interactive map of Sånga-Sundby
- Country: Sweden
- County: Stockholm County
- Municipality: Ekerö Municipality
- Time zone: UTC+1 (CET)
  - Summer (DST): UTC+2 (CEST)

Sånga-Sundby is a village (smaller locality) in Ekerö Municipality, Stockholm County, southeastern Sweden.
