= Slottshagen, Ekerö Municipality =

Coordinates: 59°17′N 17°40′E

Slottshagen, Ekerö kommun
- Smaller locality
- Interactive map of Slottshagen, Ekerö kommun
- Country: Sweden
- County: Stockholm County
- Municipality: Ekerö Municipality
- Time zone: UTC+1 (CET)
  - Summer (DST): UTC+2 (CEST)

Slottshagen is a village (smaller locality) in Ekerö Municipality, Stockholm County, southeastern Sweden.
