= Svartsjö County =

Coordinates: 59°21′23″N 17°39′39″E

County of Svartsjö Svartsjö län
- County of Sweden
- 1787–1809
- Flag
- History
  - Established: 1787
  - Disestablished: 1809
Preceded by	Succeeded by
County of Stockholm	County of Stockholm

The County of Svartsjö, or Svartsjö län was a county in the Kingdom of Sweden from 1787 to 1809. It was separated the County of Stockholm and corresponds to the current Ekerö Municipality.
