= Kaggens täppa =

- Smaller locality
- Interactive map of Kaggens täppa
- Coordinates: 59°16′30″N 17°41′13″E
- Country: Sweden
- County: Stockholm County
- Municipality: Ekerö Municipality
- Time zone: UTC+1 (CET)
  - Summer (DST): UTC+2 (CEST)

Kaggens täppa is a village (smaller locality) in Ekerö Municipality, Stockholm County, southeastern Sweden.
