= Gerlög and Inga =

Women of runestone record

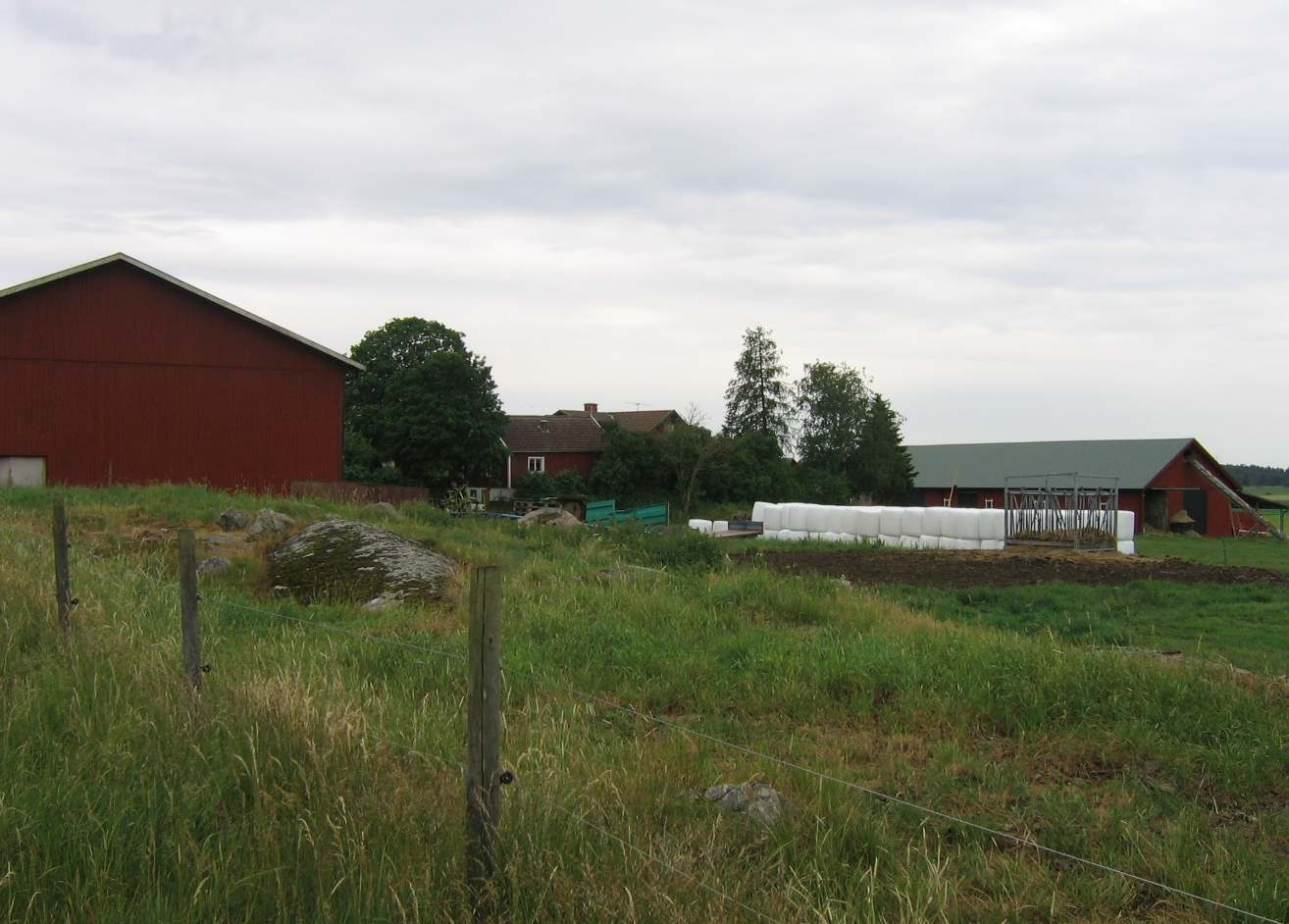
The farm Snottsta or Snåttsta, Old Norse: Snotastaðir, is still in the same spot, 1000 years after the rune stones were made as documentation of the rights of property of the estate.

Gerlög or Geirlaug and her daughter Inga were two powerful and rich women in 11th-century Uppland, Sweden. Gerlög and Inga had their dramatic and tragic family saga documented for posterity on several runestones. They lived in a turbulent time of religious wars between Pagans and Christians concerning the sacrifices at the Temple at Uppsala, and like many people of their social standing they had chosen the new faith. Their saga has been the centre of an exposition at the Stockholm County Museum dramatizing their story.

The Hillersjö stone is the main inscription. It recounts that Gerlög married with Germund in her maidenhood, and they had a son who is not named, but Germund drowned and the son died. Then Gerlög remarried with Gudrik and they had several children, but only one survived, who was named Inga. Inga married Ragnfast of Snottsta (also spelled Snåttsta) and they had a son who is not named. Both Ragnfast and the son died, so Inga inherited the estate Snottsta.

The four Snottsta and Vreta stones at Snottsta and Vreta say that Ragnfast, Inga's husband has died. Ragnfast was the sole inheritor of the estate Snottsta after his father Sigfast. One of the stones gives the central information "she inherited her child". This statement agrees with what is said on the Hillersjö stone, which is that Inga inherited instead of her son, a son who was not named, probably because he was very young. The central message of these runestones is "Inga inherited Snottsta after Ragnfast".

Further information provided by the runestones is that Ragnfast had a housecarl named Assur. Why this is important is not mentioned, but it is likely that Assur had a strong position in the clan and may have inherited some of Ragnfast's property.

Furthermore, the Snottsta runestone U 329 contains some information about a third and a fourth woman, Estrid and Gyrid. It says that Ragnfast is the brother of Gyrid and Estrid, and the reason why this is mentioned is possibly because there was a disagreement about the inheritance. What is clear is that they are mentioned to explain how they relate to Inga.

The Hillersjö stone continues the story by telling that Inga married again with a man named Eric, but apparently both Inga and Eric soon died without leaving any children, as Gerlög inherited her daughter.

This text is completed with information by Inga from Runestone U 20/U 21, where it is said that both Gudrik (Gerlög's second husband and Inga's father) and Eric (Inga's second husband) had died.

The people described in the inscriptions U 20-21, 29, 329-332

♂Gęiʀmundr	♀Gęiʀlaug	♂Guðríkʀ	Sigfastr (Note: Owner of the farm Snutastaðiʀ (Snottsta).)
♂Unknown son	Unknown children	♂Ęiríkʀ	♀Inga	♂Ragnfastr (Note: Inherited the farm from his father Sigfastr, he in turn passed it on to Inga, who passed it on to Gęiʀlaug.)	♀Gyríðr	♀Æstríðr
♂Unknown son

== See also ==
- Åsetesrett

== Sources and external links ==
- Rundata
- Inga och Estrid - en såpa för tusen år sedan: Människor, händelser och platser i Ingas och Estrids liv, Människor, händelser och platser i Ingas och Estrids liv.. A page at the Stockholm County Museum.
- ''Gerlögs berättelse - fakta och fiktion'' at the Stockholm County Museum.
- Inga & Estrid - en såpa för tusen år sedan, at the Stockholm County Museum.
- Jesch, Judith (1991) Women in the Viking Age. Boydell Press 1991. ISBN 978-0-85115-360-5
- Hillersjö stone (U 29)
- Färentuna Runestones (U 20/U 21)
- Snottsta and Vreta stones (U 329, U 330, U 331 and U 332)
