= Nockebybron =

Bridge connecting Ekerö County and Bromma, Stockholm County

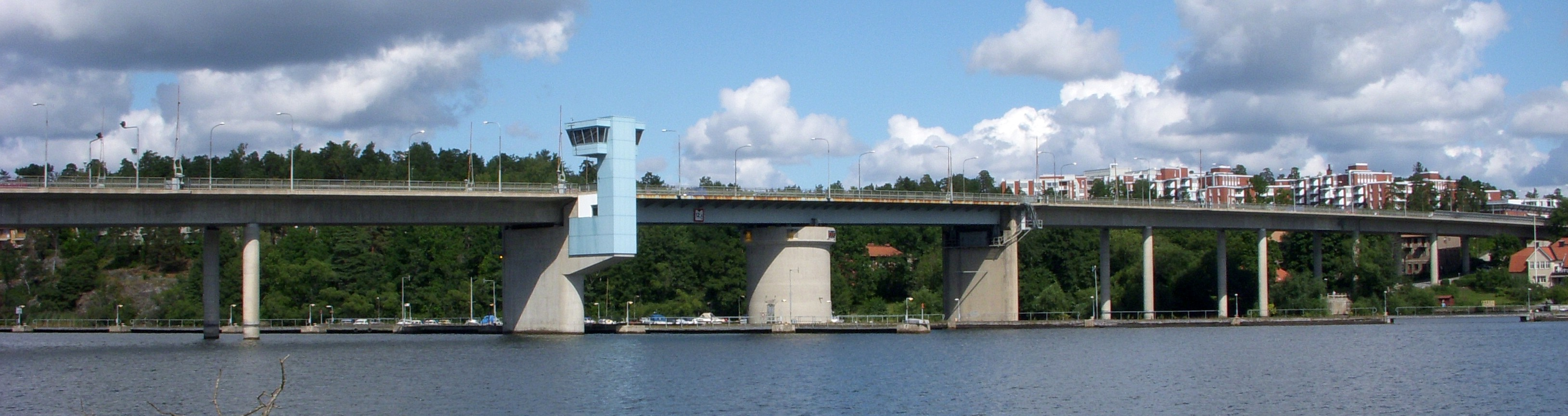
- Coordinates: 59°19′39″N 17°54′34″E

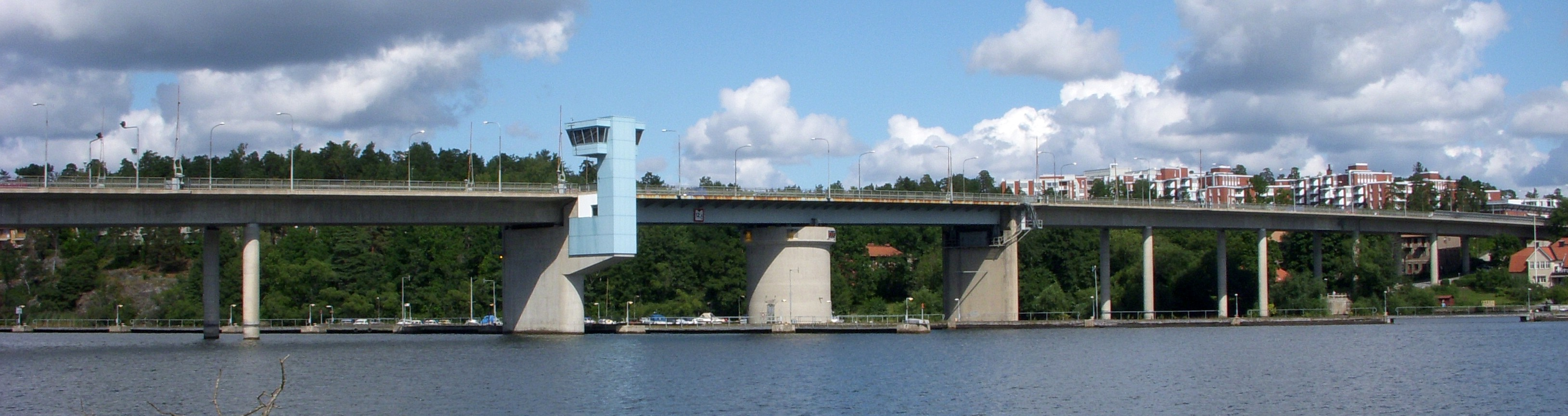

Nockebybron (The Nockeby Bridge) is a 450 meter long swing bridge in Lake Mälaren between Kärsön in the Ekerö County and Nockeby in Bromma, Stockholm County, Sweden. The current bridge was opened in 1973.

== Images ==
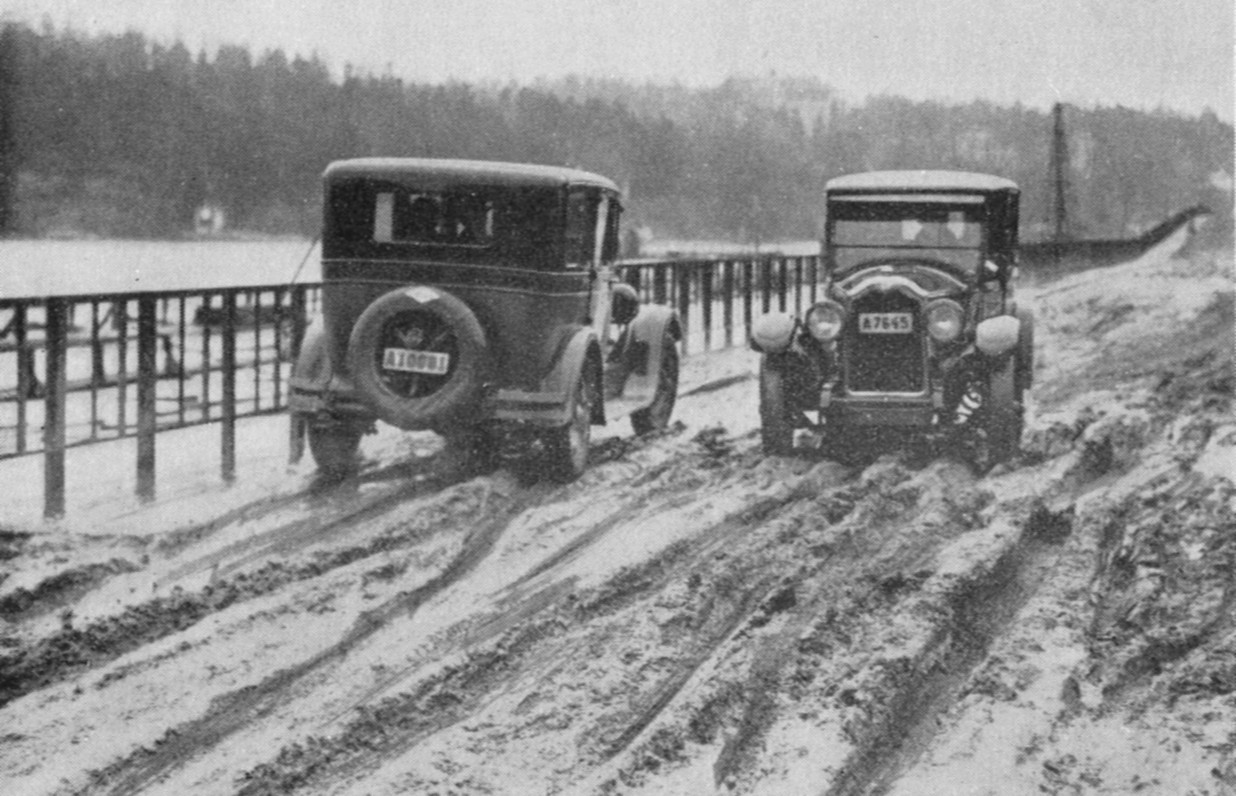
Nockeby Bridge in the 1920s.

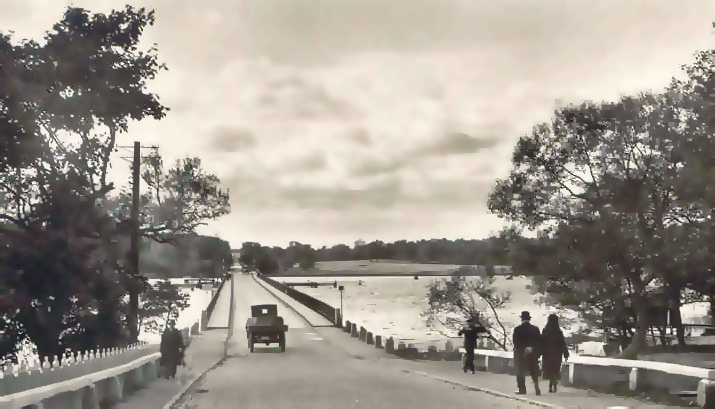
Nockeby Bridge ca. 1940.

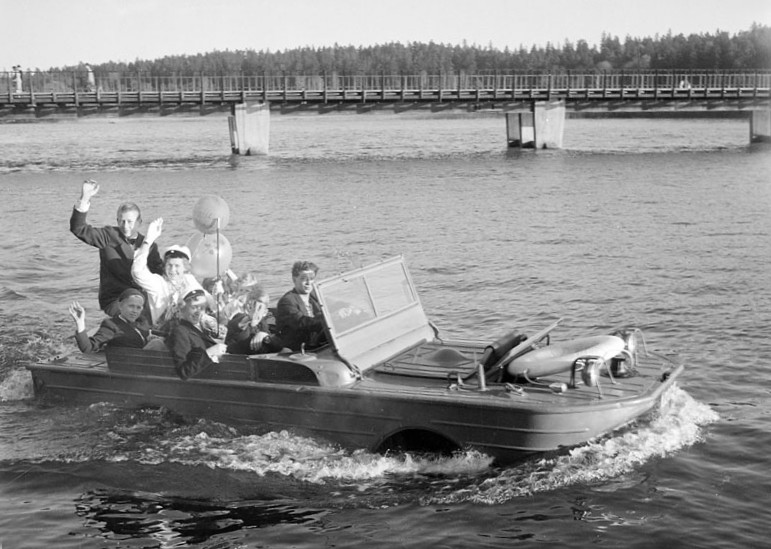
Nockeby Bridge in 1950.

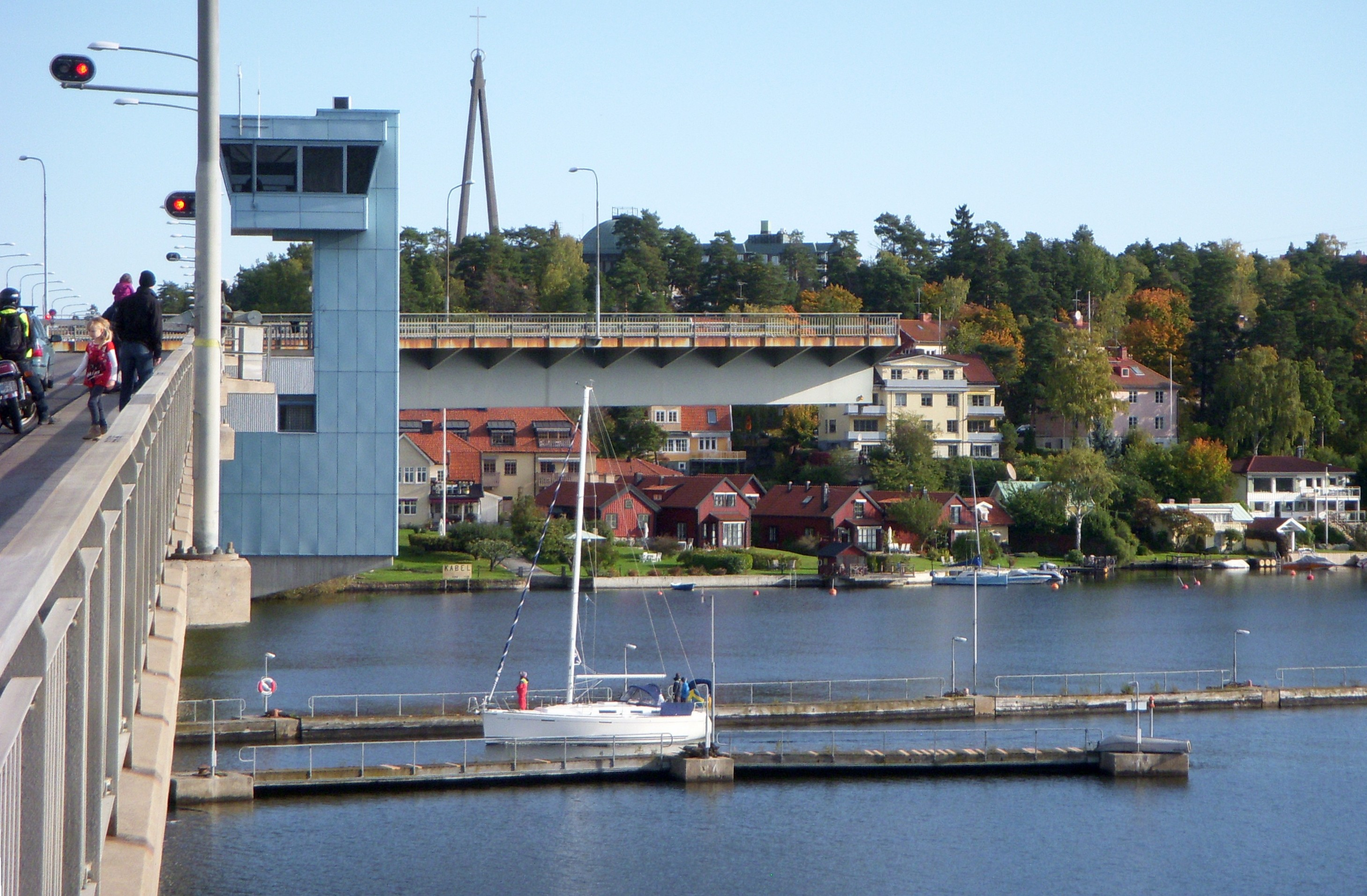
The current Nockeby Bridge swing bridge, midsection opening in 2011.
