= Bergvik, Ekerö Municipality =

Coordinates: 59°18′00″N 17°40′12″E

Bergvik, Ekerö kommun
- Smaller locality
- Interactive map of Bergvik, Ekerö kommun
- Country: Sweden
- County: Stockholm County
- Municipality: Ekerö Municipality

Population (2005)
  - Total: 92
- Time zone: UTC+1 (CET)
  - Summer (DST): UTC+2 (CEST)

Bergvik, Ekerö kommun, is a village (smaller locality) in Ekerö Municipality, Stockholm County, southeastern Sweden. According to the 2005 census it had a population of 92 people.
