= Hilleshög =

- Smaller locality
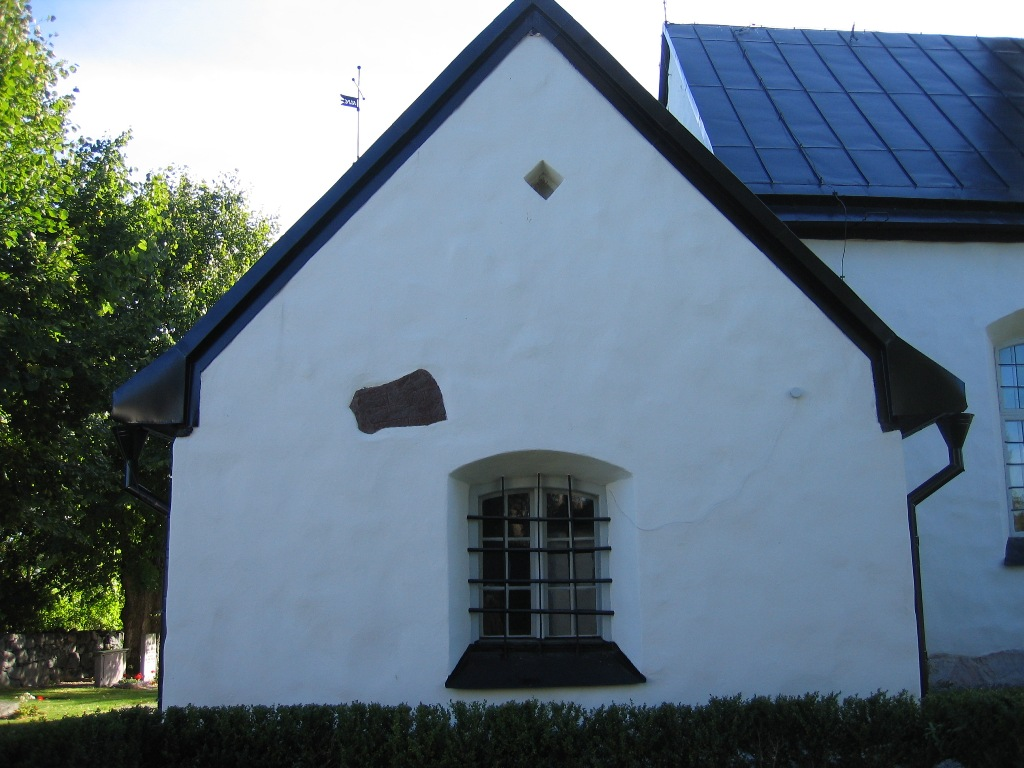
- Hilleshög Church

- Location in Stockholm County
- Coordinates: 59°23′25″N 17°42′13″E
- Country: Sweden
- County: Stockholm County
- Municipality: Ekerö Municipality

Population (2005)
  - Total: 143
- Time zone: UTC+1 (CET)
  - Summer (DST): UTC+2 (CEST)

Hilleshög is a village (smaller locality) in Ekerö Municipality, Stockholm County, southeastern Sweden.

Hilleshög Church is located here.

== Notable residents ==
- Ulrika von Strussenfelt (1801-1873), writer
- Amelie von Strussenfelt (1803-1847), writer
