= Brommaplan =

Road intersection in Stockholm, Sweden

Coordinates: 59°20′18″N 17°56′17″E

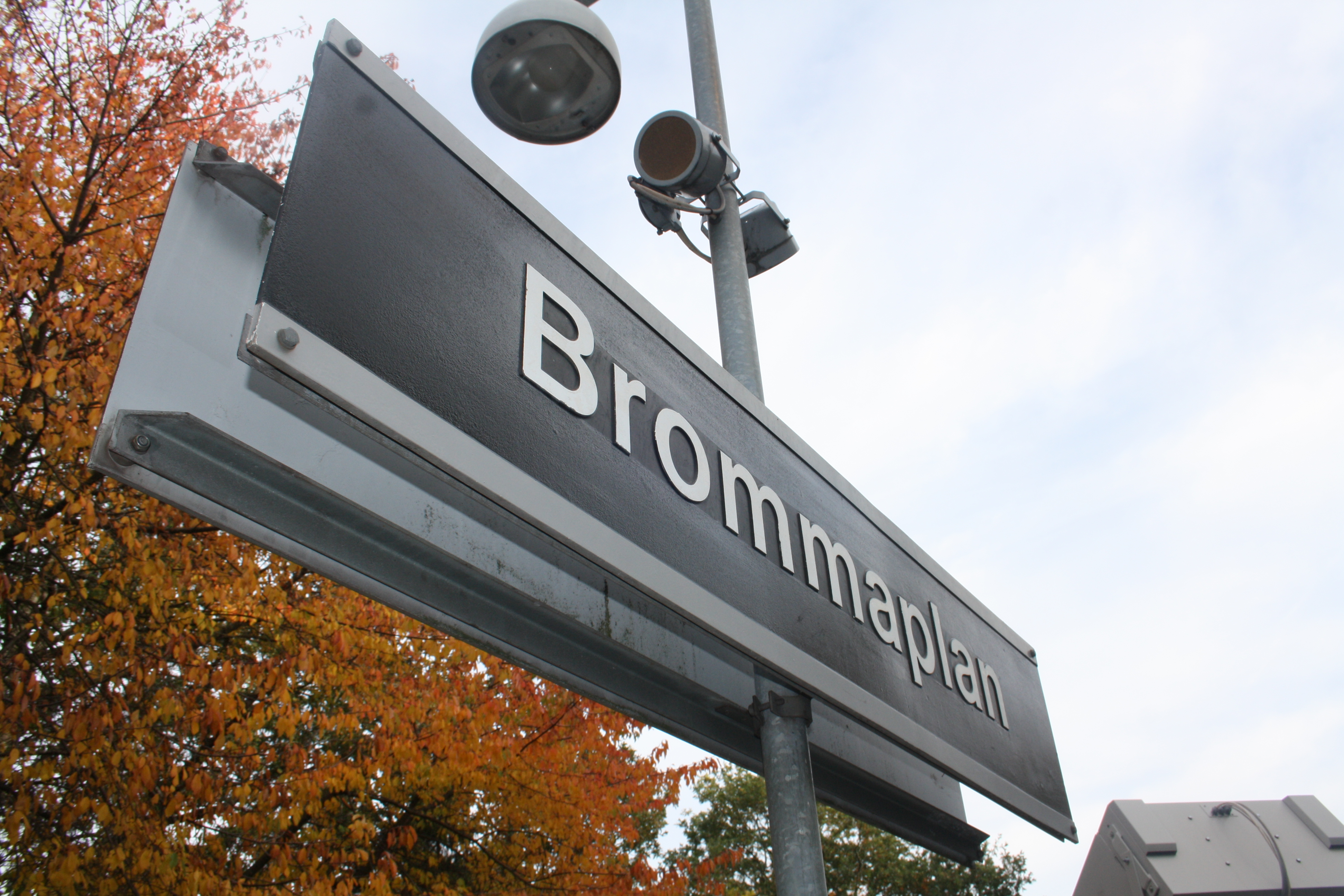
Brommaplan signage

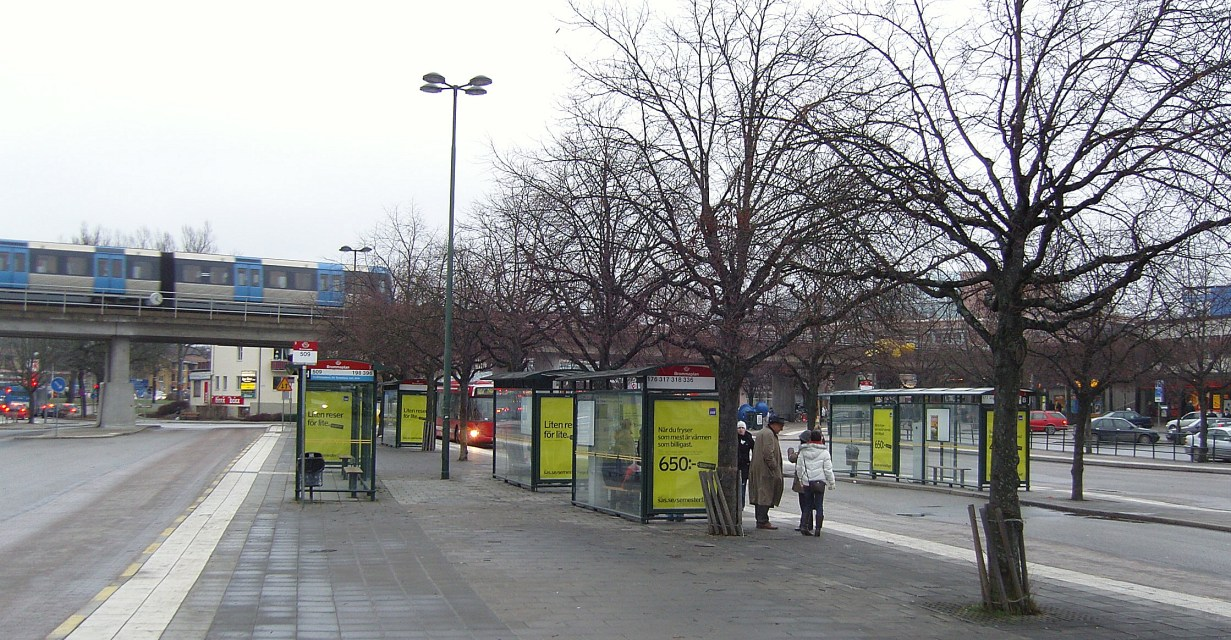
Brommaplan bus and subway terminal

Brommaplan (Bromma Square) is a roundabout in the borough of Bromma in Stockholm, Sweden.

== Description ==
Brommaplan is a local center and traffic hub in Bromma. It includes Brommaplan metro station and a large bus terminal offering connections to Drottningholm and Ekerö. It has six connecting streets and is situated at the intersection of Drottningholmsvägen 400, Kvarnbacksvägen 135, Spångavägen 1 and Bergslagsvägen 1.

== See also ==
- Brommaplan metro station
