= Färingsö =

Island in Sweden

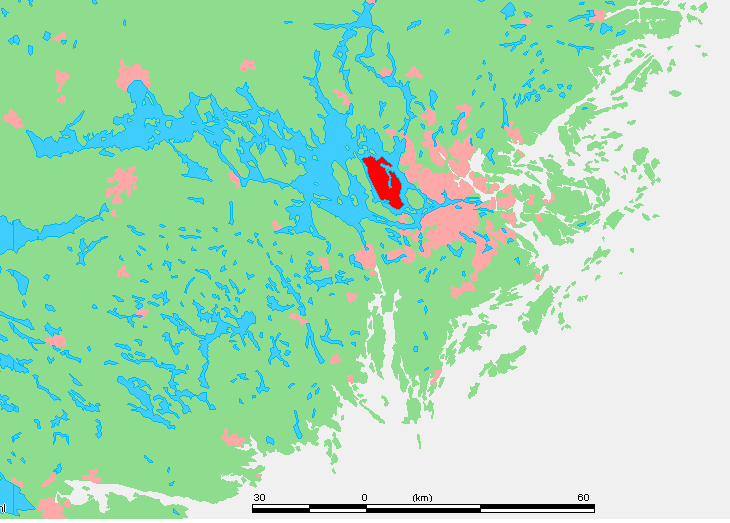
- Färingsö in dark red, just west of Stockholm.

Geography
- Location: Mälaren
- Coordinates: 59°23′N 17°38′E
- Area: 82.02 km^{2} (31.67 sq mi)

Administration
- Sweden
- County: Stockholm
- Municipality: Ekerö

Färingsö or Svartsjölandet is an island in Sweden's Lake Mälaren. It covers an area of 82.02 km^{2}. The island is a part of Ekerö Municipality. The largest village on the island is Stenhamra. The island is also named after the village of Svartsjö, which is located in Ekerö Municipality of Stockholm County.
