= Sundby, Sweden =

Sundby
- Location within Stockholm Location within Sweden Location within European Union
- Coordinates: 59°17′N 17°43′E
- Country: Sweden
- Province: Uppland
- County: Stockholm County
- Municipality: Ekerö Municipality

Area
  - Total: 0.21 km^{2} (0.081 sq mi)

Population (31 December 2020)
  - Total: 471
  - Density: 2,200/km^{2} (5,800/sq mi)
- Time zone: UTC+1 (CET)
  - Summer (DST): UTC+2 (CEST)

Sundby is a locality in Ekerö Municipality, Stockholm County, Sweden it had 270 inhabitants in 2010.
