= Stenhamra =

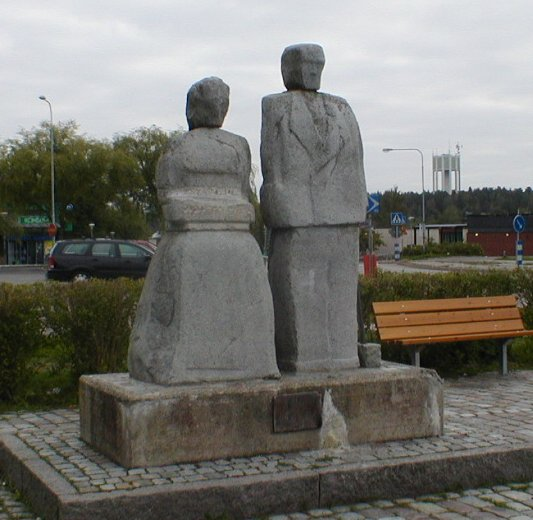
- Sculpture in Central Stenhamra

- Location within Stockholm Location within Sweden Location within European Union
- Coordinates: 59°20′N 17°40′E
- Country: Sweden
- Province: Uppland
- County: Stockholm County
- Municipality: Ekerö Municipality

Area
  - Total: 2.91 km^{2} (1.12 sq mi)

Population (31 December 2020)
  - Total: 3,636
  - Density: 1,250/km^{2} (3,240/sq mi)
- Time zone: UTC+1 (CET)
  - Summer (DST): UTC+2 (CEST)

Stenhamra is a locality situated on the island Färingsö in Sweden's Lake Mälaren. The island is located in Ekerö Municipality, Stockholm County. It had 3,336 inhabitants as of 2010. The specialized Children's Library of Stenhamra (Barnens eget bibliotek i Stenhamra) is located here.
