= Markim Church =

Church in Stockholm County, Sweden

Coordinates: 59°36′22.7″N 18°03′00.2″E

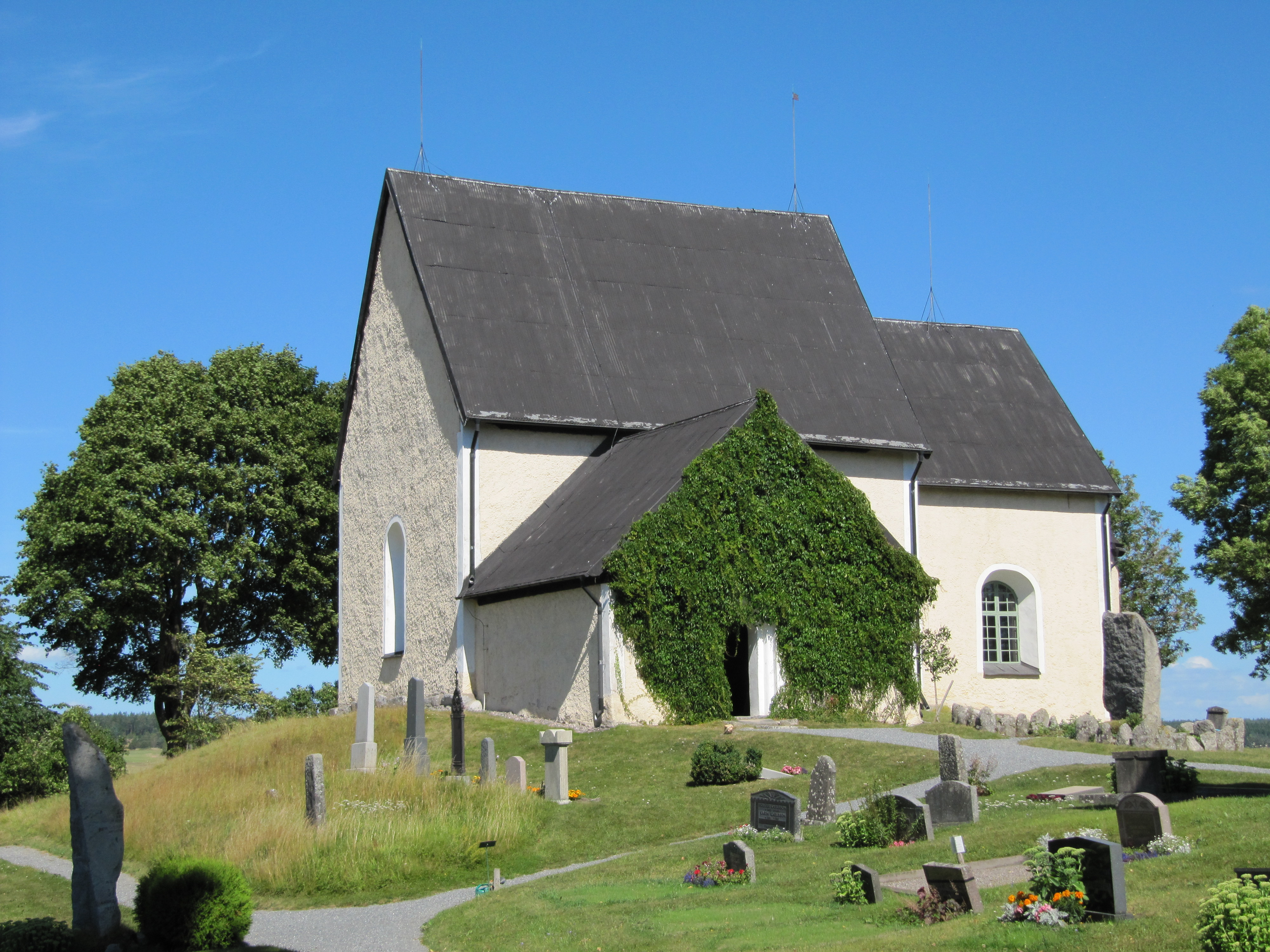
Markim Church, external view

Markim Church (Swedish: Markims kyrka) is a medieval Lutheran church in the Diocese of Stockholm in Stockholm County, Sweden. The church is a listed building, located in a designated area of national cultural interest.

== History ==
Markim is mentioned in written sources for the first time in 1287, but both etymological and archaeological evidence suggest that the cultural landscape surrounding the church is considerably older. The landscape had ancient traditions already during the Middle Ages, when the church was built. The church is situated on a small hill were an earlier, pagan sacrificial well was located. The area is rich in rune stones.

The church was built during the early 13th century; dendrochronological evidence point to that the roof was laid in about 1213. It remains a largely unaltered Romanesque building. It belongs to the "first generation" of church building in Sweden. A church porch was added during the 15th century, and during the same time the ceiling was vaulted. The external bell tower was built in wood in 1727. The windows of the church were also enlarged during the 18th century, and a round window in the apse inserted during the early 19th century. The tin roof is similarly from the 19th century.

== Architecture ==
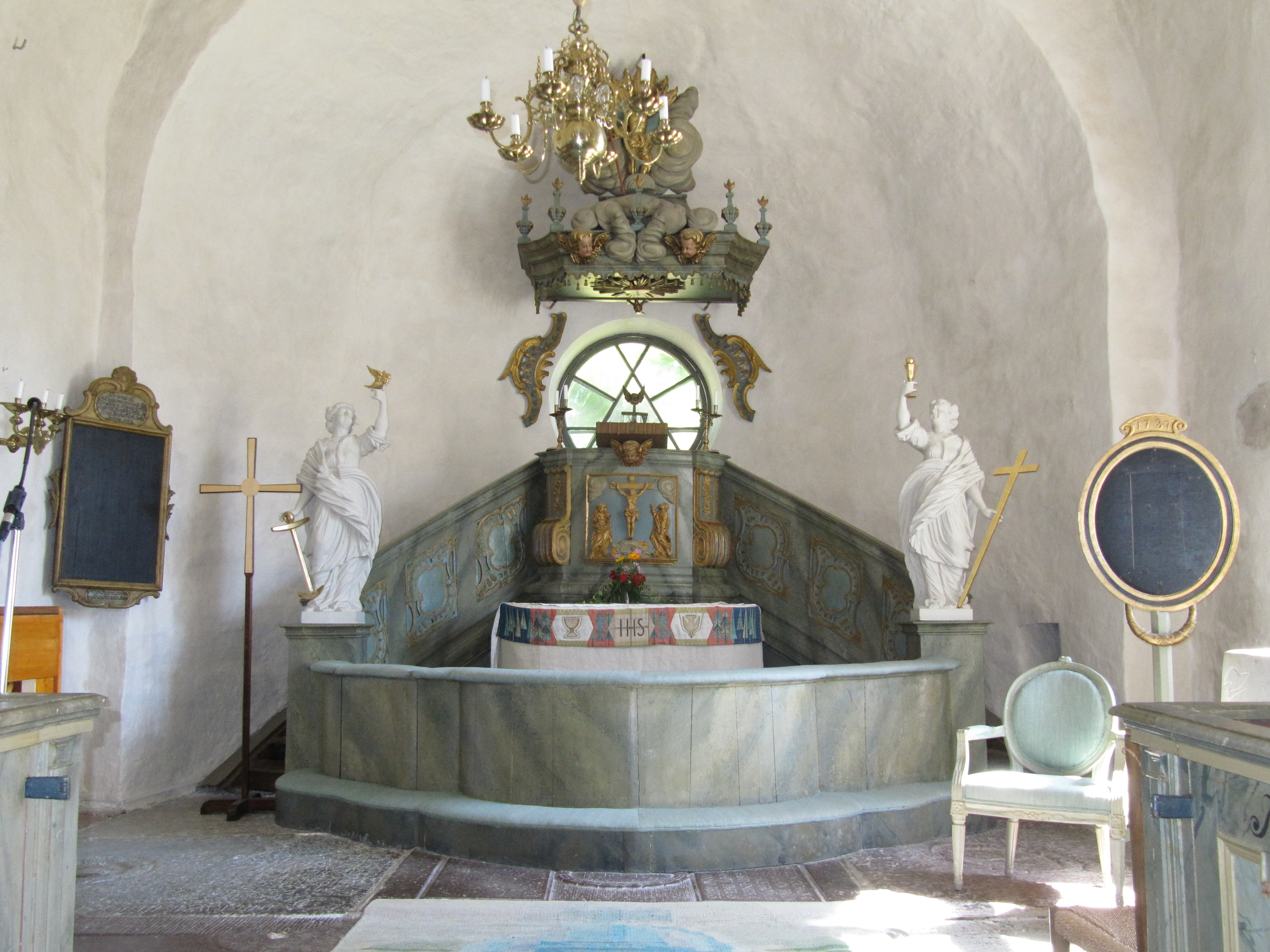
The apse with the Rococo altar and pulpit

Externally, the church retains much of its Romanesque appearance. Although painted yellow today, originally the roughly hewn stones of which the church was built were exposed. The original church door still remains. It dates from the 12th century and so is older than the church itself. Made of oak, it is decorated with metal hoops in different forms and shapes. The exterior of the church gives a good idea of what early Romanesque churches in the Nordic countries often looked like. It is also one of few early medieval churches in Uppland which has retained its original floor plan.

Inside, the church is whitewashed except for the church porch, where fragments of medieval frescos have been found and are now again displayed. Of the church furnishings, only the triumphal cross is medieval. It is of a type more commonly found on Gotland than in Uppland, and dates from the second half of the 13th century. The altar and pulpit, dominating the apse, are a work by the carpenter Magnus Granlund (1711-1779) from Stockholm, and Rococo in style. Granlund worked on several churches in Uppland. The organ facade is from the 1820s and in a provincial Empire style, while the organ itself was replaced in 1985. The baptismal font is a modern work, presented to the church in 1972.

The church has never had a tower but instead an external belfry. The presently visible belfry replaced an earlier of unknown age. It carries two church bells, one medieval and one made in 1727.
