= Ekerö Municipality =

Ekerö Municipality Ekerö kommun
- Municipality
- Coat of arms

- Coordinates: 59°17′N 17°48′E
- Country: Sweden
- County: Stockholm County
- Seat: Ekerö

Area
  - Total: 383.61 km^{2} (148.11 sq mi)
  - Land: 217.68 km^{2} (84.05 sq mi)
  - Water: 165.93 km^{2} (64.07 sq mi)
- Area as of 1 January 2014.

Population (30 June 2025)
  - Total: 29,050
  - Density: 133.5/km^{2} (345.6/sq mi)
- Time zone: UTC+1 (CET)
  - Summer (DST): UTC+2 (CEST)
- ISO 3166 code: SE
- Province: Uppland
- Municipal code: 0125
- Website: www.ekero.se
- Density is calculated using land area only.

Ekerö Municipality (Swedish: Ekerö kommun) is a municipality in the province of Uppland in Stockholm County in east central Sweden. The name derives from the name of the main island within the municipality whose name is Ekerön, and literally means "Oak Island". Its seat is located in the town of Ekerö.

The King of Sweden resides in Ekerö Municipality, at Drottningholm Palace (see below).

Originally, when the first local government acts were implemented in Sweden in 1863, eight rural municipalities were created, each corresponding to an old parish. The municipal reform of 1952 grouped them in two new larger entities. The next reform in 1971 merged them into the present municipality.

== Geography ==
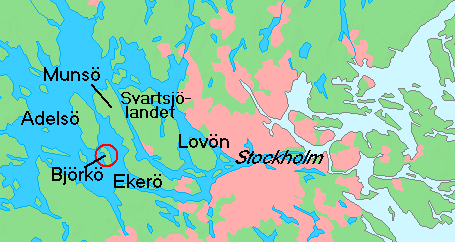
Ekerö's main islands

Ekerö is the only municipality in the Lake Mälaren region composed exclusively of islands. The post-glacial rebound has reduced the number of islands and skerries to 140, the largest of which are Adelsö, Munsö, Ekerö, Färingsö, and Lovö. 2000 years ago, during the Roman Iron Age, Färingsön was more of an archipelago of twenty islands.

== Heritage ==
The municipality contains two UNESCO World Heritage Sites. One is Birka, an old Viking Age village, and the other is Drottningholm Palace and its surroundings.

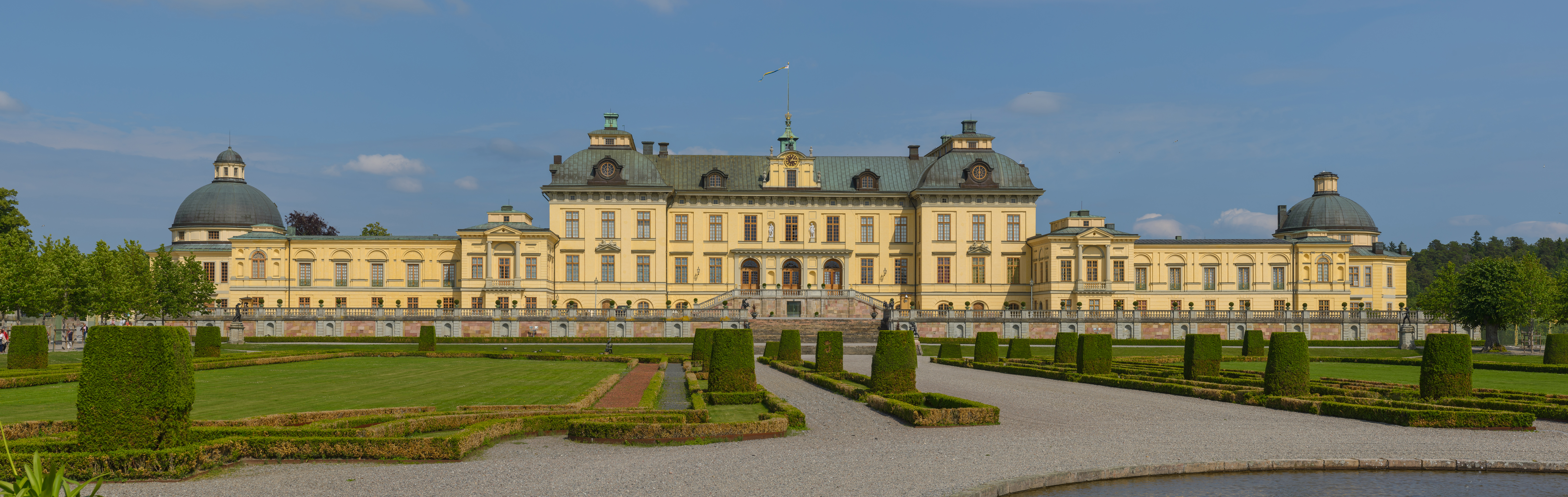
Drottningholm Palace

Drottningholm, located on the Lovö island, was originally a Renaissance palace built by King John III for Queen Catherine Jagellon. On December 30, 1661, the old palace burned down. Queen Dowager Hedvig Eleonora had a new palace erected out of the preserved walls and cellar vaults from King John III’s palace in the French Baroque style to the design of architect Nicodemus Tessin the Elder, a work later completed by Nicodemus Tessin the Younger, Carl Hårleman, and Jean Eric Rehn. Since 1981 it is the permanent residence of the royal family, but large parts of the park are accessible to the public. The palace features several uniquely preserved structures, including the Palace Theatre, inaugurated in 1766 and still delivering operas using the preserved original machinery; and the Chinese Pavilion, the Rococo design of Carl Fredrik Adelcrantz filled with Chinese luxury delivered by the Swedish East India Company.

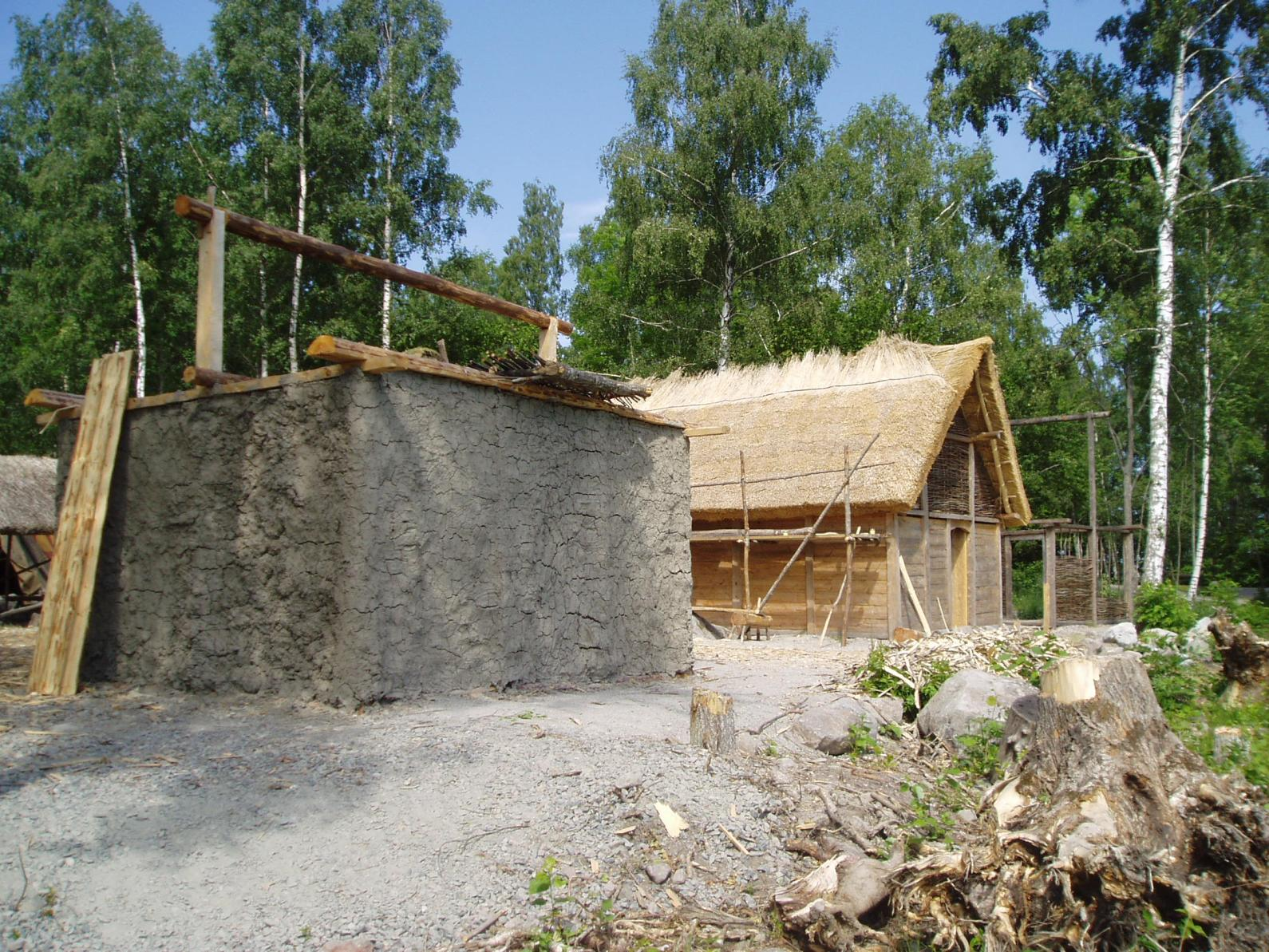
Reconstructed clay buildings at Birka

Birka on the Björkö island is the oldest urban structure in Sweden, founded in the mid eighth century. In the ninth century, Ansgar, Archbishop of Hamburg-Bremen, made two failed attempts to convert its inhabitants. The settlement was finally abandoned in the late tenth century for unknown reasons. The excavations of the approximately 1.100 graves in the area started in 1871 and have continued since. A museum was created in 1995, and in summers various boats carry large numbers of tourists to the island.

=== Other notable historical sites ===
Other historical sights of interest are several runestones and other Viking remains, eight medieval churches, and old towns.

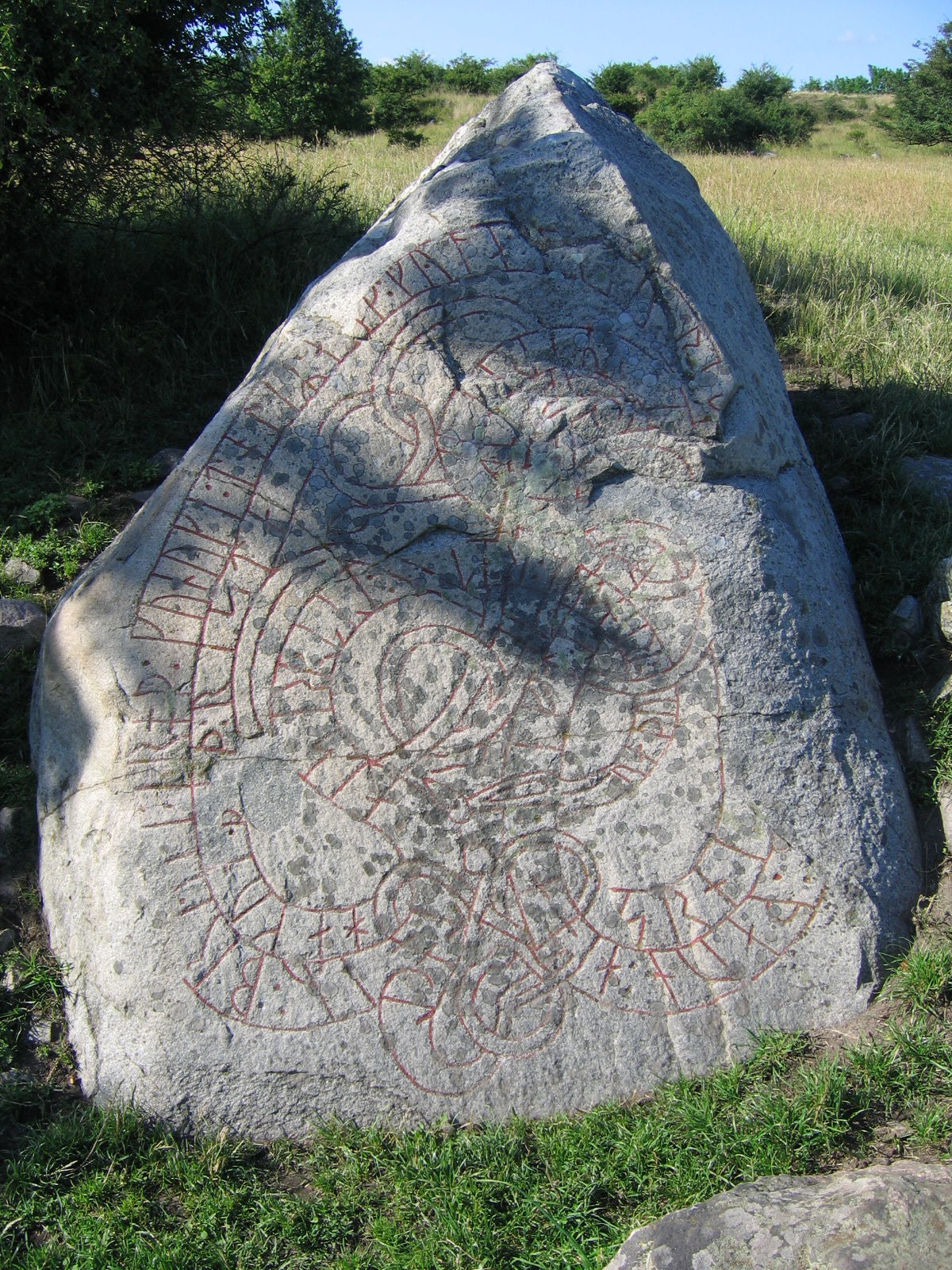
U 11, the runic inscription retelling the story of Håkon the Red in the 11th century

.

On the Adelsö Island is Hovgården, together with Birka a world heritage site, featuring barrows, thick walls, and runestones. There is also Alsnö hus, the ruins of the summer residence of Magnus Barnlock where the Ordinance of Alsnö created the foundation of the Swedish nobility, and a Romanesque church from the 12th century.

Next to this Crown palace is the residential area Drottningholmsmalmen ("Drottningholm Ridge/Esker") which draws its history back to the Torvesund manor built in 1579-80 and which served as a place of refuge for the Jesuits following the Reformation. During the 18th century, soldiers, carpenters and other craftsmen working at The Royal Palace settled in the area. Intentions were to develop it into a suburb to the palace like at the Versailles Palace, and this end the area was granted the status of a city to attract entrepreneurs and artists to the royal court. During the reign of King Gustav III had several buildings erected, including the Långa raden (the "Long Row") to accommodate the royal life guard. By 1815 78 properties existed in the area. However, it failed to develop in the direction sketched-out by Gustav III, and instead evolved into a summer residence area inhabited by wealthy burghers, the large-scales villas in a wide range of styles have given the area its characteristics. In the middle of the 20th century, several buildings by well-known Swedish architects, including Nils Tesch, Ralph Erskine, Peter Celsing and Bengt Lindroos, were added.

Kanton is a group of twenty buildings next to the Chinese Pavilion built in the 1750s and 1760s, intended to be a mercantile prototype settlement. 70-80 people lived there for a few decades producing luxury items for the royal court and the nobility, including some of the interior of the China Pavillin. The buildings later inspired author Elsa Beskow to some of her fairy tales.

Kungshatt ("King's Hat") is a rocky island south of Lovön where, according to a legend, a king Erik Väderhatt ("Eric Weather Hat"), so named because of his fortune with the winds which he could foretell with his hat, escaped his enemies by jumping from the cliff with his horse. The location for this event was furnished with a copper hat, now substituted with an iron hat.

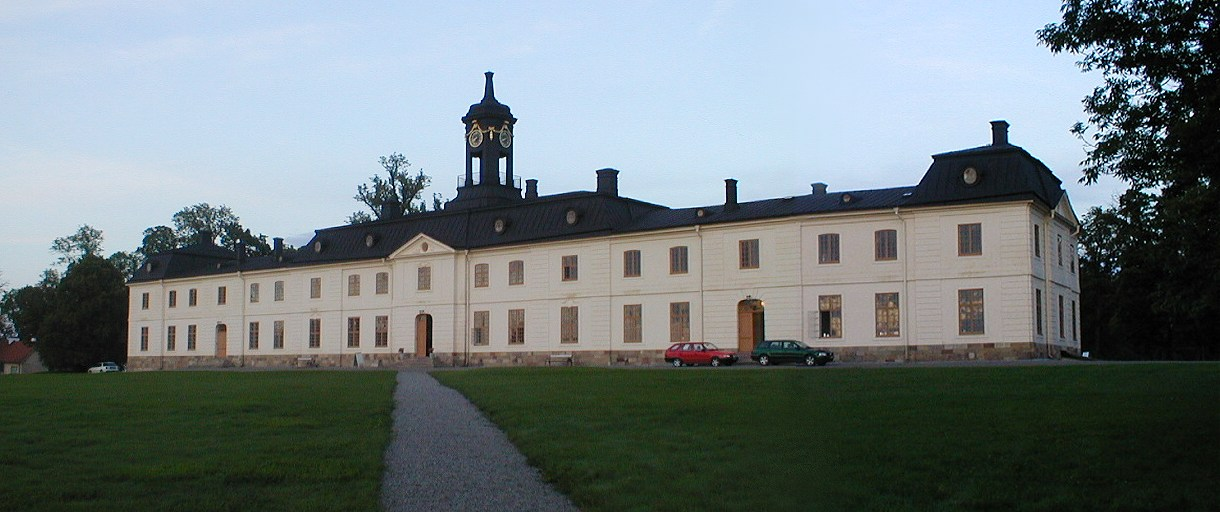
Svartsjö palace

Svartsjö Palace was originally a Folkung mansion. The palace King Gustav I and his sons had built here was destroyed by fire in 1687. The rococo palace, built 1735–1739 to the design of Carl Hårleman and later expanded by Queen Louisa Ulrika, was neglected for centuries before being restored. Its Baroque and English gardens are preserved.

Hilleshög Church is a mostly Romanesque edifice, built in granite and brick, with some parts from the 17th and 18th centuries and later additions. Many of the paintings in the interior, dating back to the end of the 13th century and the early 15th century, were painted over in the 18th century but were restored in the 1920s and in 2002, together with some of the furniture.

Ekebyhov is a real estate created around 1630. Its main building, Ekebyhov Palace, is a wooden structure begun in 1674 and completed in 1704. It is the oldest preserved wooden palace in Europe. The gardens of the palace boasts several unique plants and features a café. It is since 1980 owned by the municipality.

Skytteholm is a seat farm. Its main building, Skytteholm Mansion, was one of the mansions of Johan Skytte, mentor of Gustavus Adolphus the Great, had built in the Lake Mälaren region. Founded in 1631, its present appearance is mostly from around 1920. It is today mostly used for conferences and as a hotel.

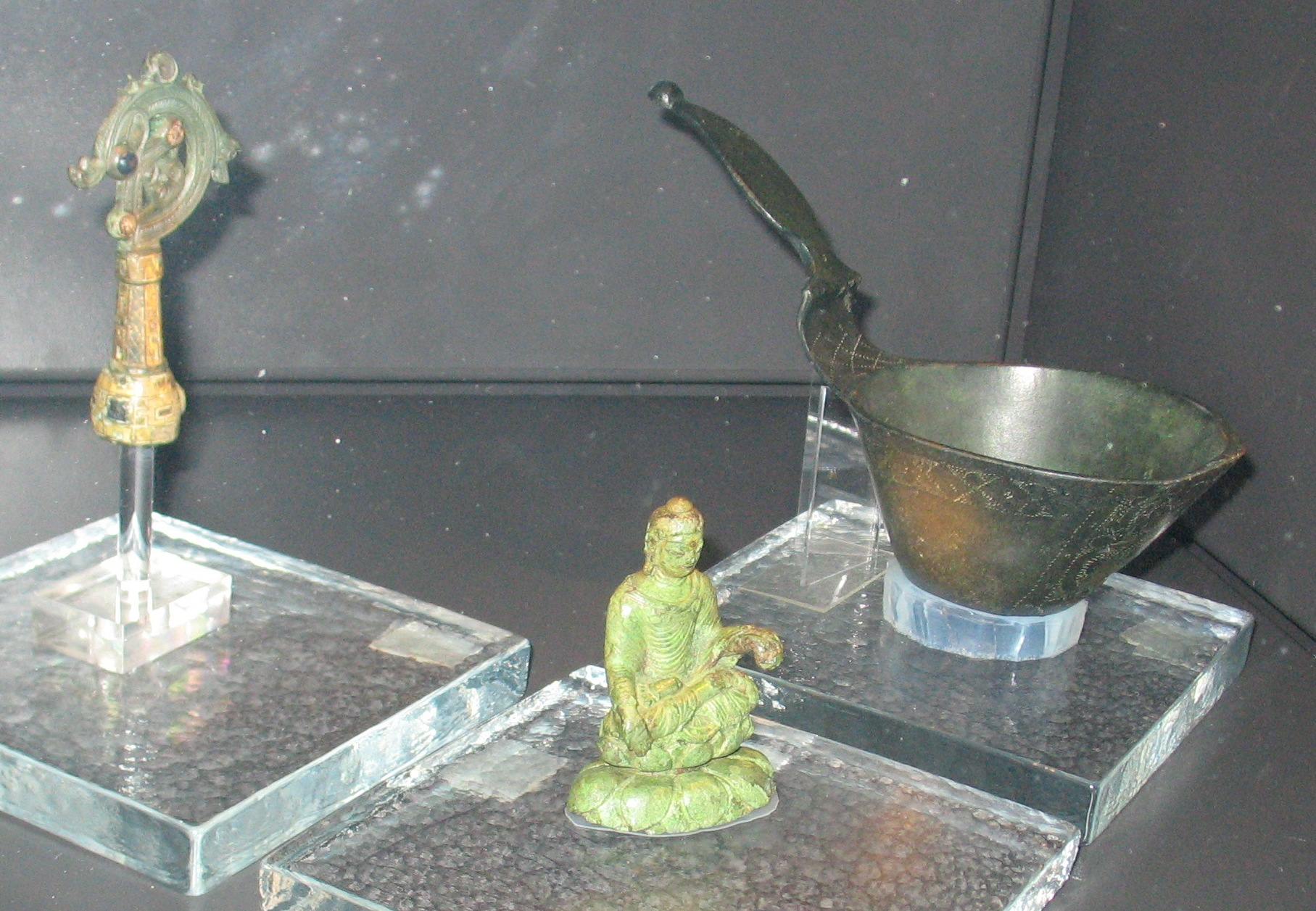
Holy objects found on Helgö.

In the 1950s, ancient remains were found on the island of Helgö. The excavations that followed unveiled eight groups of buildings and objects from Ireland, Egypt, and India dating back to the eighth century offering a hint of the extent of the trade of the era. The settlement is, however, believed to be considerably older and have reached its peak around 500-600 CE. On Helgö is also the Kaggeholm Palace, with a history stretching back to 1370. The palace was built in the 1720s.

The Barrow of Björn Ironside on Munsö Island is part of the Iron Age grave field Munsö-Husby. On Munsö is also Munsö Church; one of three round churches in the Stockholm area. Probably built in 1187, it contains several medieval wooden sculptures.

== Nature ==
There are several outdoor activities that can be enjoyed, such as fishing and bicycling, as the nature is always nearby. Each of the islands also offers distinctive experiences and sights.

== Demographics ==
=== Population development ===
Population development in Ekerö Municipality 1970–2019
Year	Population
1970	12,594
1975	15,081
1980	15,927
1985	16,534
1990	18,785
1995	20,866
2000	22,266
2005	24,010
2010	25,410
2015	26,984
2017	27,753
2019	28,690

=== 2022 by district ===
This is a demographic table based on Ekerö Municipality's electoral districts in the 2022 Swedish general election sourced from SVT's election platform, in turn taken from SCB official statistics.

In total there were 29,062 residents, including 20,320 Swedish citizens of voting age. 42.0% voted for the left coalition and 56.9% for the right coalition. Indicators are in percentage points except population totals and income.

Location	Residents	Citizen adults	Left vote	Right vote	Employed	Swedish parents	Foreign heritage	Income SEK	Degree
Location			%	%					
Adelsö	780	646	43.7	55.3	81	83	17	26,010	36
Ekerö 1 Ekebyhov	2,118	1,236	43.9	55.6	81	77	23	37,057	60
Ekerö 2 Ekebyhov V	1,786	1,261	50.1	47.1	79	71	29	27,073	42
Ekerö 3 Ekerö-Väsby	1,895	1,369	46.0	53.0	85	89	11	32,685	54
Ekerö 4 Träkvista	1,648	1,152	40.4	58.6	87	89	11	45,199	69
Ekerö 5 Närlunda	1,918	1,364	40.8	58.5	86	89	11	39,387	68
Ekerö 6 Älvnäs	1,784	1,205	38.9	60.6	86	85	15	37,918	60
Ekerö 7 Sundby Helgö	1,977	1,345	39.3	60.2	82	78	22	32,097	52
Ekerö 8 Ekerö C	885	702	55.1	43.8	68	70	30	22,378	35
Ekerö 9 Träkvista	949	654	38.6	60.3	86	88	12	36,305	58
Ekerö 10 Sandudden	1,518	976	36.8	63.1	87	91	9	42,592	73
Färingsö 1 Norra	1,623	1,171	38.5	60.6	82	86	14	29,829	40
Färingsö 2 Färentuna	1,453	1,037	43.4	55.4	81	78	22	29,690	40
Färingsö 3 Svartsjö	1,244	801	40.9	57.8	87	72	28	32,021	35
Färingsö 4 Stenhamra S	1,753	1,299	41.1	57.8	86	87	13	32,560	44
Färingsö 5 Stenhamra N	1,822	1,295	41.3	56.9	84	81	19	29,846	45
Färingsö 6 Skå	1,609	1,066	42.6	56.1	83	83	17	31,730	49
Lovö	978	768	46.4	52.0	79	83	17	32,163	61
Munsö	1,322	973	35.9	62.8	85	82	18	28,647	34
Source: SVT

=== Income and Education ===
The population in Ekerö Municipality has the seventh highest median income per capita in Sweden, although the share of highly educated persons, according to Statistics Sweden's definition: persons with post-secondary education that is three years or longer, is 31.3% and slightly over the national average, 27.0%.

=== Residents with a foreign background ===
On 31 December 2017 the number of people with a foreign background (persons born outside of Sweden or with two parents born outside of Sweden) was 5 825, or 20.99% of the population (27 753 on 31 December 2017). On 31 December 2002 the number of residents with a foreign background was (per the same definition) 2 358, or 10.28% of the population (22 936 on 31 December 2002). On 31 December 2017 there were 27 753 residents in Ekerö, of which 3 345 people (12.05%) were born in a country other than Sweden. Divided by country in the table below - the Nordic countries as well as the 12 most common countries of birth outside of Sweden for Swedish residents have been included, with other countries of birth bundled together by continent by Statistics Sweden.

Country of birth
31 December 2017
1	Sweden	24,408
2	European Union: Other countries	620
3	Finland	468
4	Poland	462
5	Asia: Other countries	270
6	Africa: Other countries	160
7	Germany	153
8	South America	146
9	Syria	136
10	North America	128
11	Europe outside of the EU: other countries	119
12	Iran	111
13	Thailand	94
14	Afghanistan	75
15	Denmark	63
16	Norway	63
17	Iraq	60
18	Eritrea	43
19	Yugoslavia/Yugoslavia; SFR Yugoslavia/Serbia and Montenegro	42
20	Turkey	32
21	Bosnia and Herzegovina	27
22	Somalia	26
23	Oceania	25
24	Soviet Union	12
25	Iceland	8
26	Unknown country of birth	2

== Politics ==
The Ekerö's politics has traditionally been dominated by the centre-right Moderate Party since 1979. The voter turnout is usually high and among the highest in the country.

=== National Election, Riksdag ===
These are the election results from the 1973 onwards in Ekerö Municipality. In the SCB reports from 1988 to 1994 the exact decimals of the Sweden Democrats were not reported since only parties near the 4% nationwide threshold were reported on. 1985, the Christian Democrats (KD) and Centre Party (C) were allied as "The Centre" so their shared votes are reported as those of C in that election.

Year	Turnout	V	S	MP	C	L	KD	M	SD	Other Parties
1973	94.3%	5.2%	33.1%	..	24.8%	11.9%	1.0%	23.9%	..	0.3%
1976	95.0%	5.3%	30.3%	..	24.2%	14.2%	0.6%	25.2%	..	0.2%
1979	93.6%	6.2%	29.6%	..	17.6%	12.9%	0.6%	32.6%	..	0.5%
1982	93.9%	5.1%	30.2%	3.2%	13.5%	7.2%	0.8%	39.9%	..	0.2%
1985	93.2%	4.2%	29.1%	1.9%	8.5%	19.3%	..	36.6%	..	0.3%
1988	89.5%	4.7%	26.7%	7.1%	9.1%	18.8%	1.7%	31.6%	..	0.2%
1991	91.2%	2.8%	21.8%	5.3%	6.8%	13.6%	5.2%	35.4%	..	9.2%
1994	90.0%	4.3%	28.4%	6.3%	7.2%	10.3%	3.5%	37.6%	..	2.4%
1998	86.2%	7.2%	24.0%	5.5%	3.6%	6.0%	12.9%	38.9%	0.5%	1.5%
2002	86.2%	5.2%	25.8%	6.4%	3.8%	20.4%	10.5%	26.1%	0.8%	1.0%
2006	88.6%	3.3%	17.1%	6.6%	7.0%	10.3%	7.4%	44.7%	1.4%	2.2%
2010	90.1%	3.2%	13.2%	8.2%	7.3%	9.3%	7.1%	47.1%	3.4%	1.1%
2014	90.7%	3.2%	16.1%	8.3%	7.1%	7.3%	6.3%	38.9%	9.4%	3.6%
2018	92.2%	4.8%	17.2%	5.7%	11.2%	7.6%	7.8%	28.1%	16.2%	1.3%

== Transport ==
=== Public transport ===
Ekerö is served by the Stockholm public transport system through SL. All bus routes have connection with the Stockholm Metro at Brommaplan. More recently a ferry has started running regularly between Ekerö and Stockholm city.

=== Roads ===
The county road 261 offers connection to motorists from Brommaplan and other western suburbs of Stockholm. There is only one bridge, Nockebybron, connecting the municipality with the mainland, but there is also a car ferry taking motorists to Botkyrka Municipality south-west of Stockholm.

== Sister towns ==
Ekerö is twinned with the following municipality:

- Otepää, Estonia

== Localities ==
- Bergvik
- Björndal
- Brygga
- Ekerö
- Drottningholm
- Jungfrusund
- Kaggens täppa
- Kungsberga
- Lurudden
- Mälby
- Parksidan
- Slottshagen
- Sluts brygga
- Solsidan
- Stav
- Stenhamra
- Sundby
- Svartsjö
- Sånga-Sundby
- Tureholm
- Väsby
- Älvnäs
- Ölsta
