= Östhamra =

- Location within Stockholm Location within Sweden
- Coordinates: 59°45′N 18°43′E
- Country: Sweden
- Province: Uppland
- County: Stockholm County
- Municipality: Norrtälje Municipality

Area
  - Total: 0.78 km^{2} (0.30 sq mi)

Population (31 December 2010)
  - Total: 255
  - Density: 328/km^{2} (850/sq mi)
- Time zone: UTC+1 (CET)
  - Summer (DST): UTC+2 (CEST)

Östhamra is a locality in Norrtälje Municipality, Stockholm County, Sweden. It is situated just to the south of the town of Norrtälje. It had 255 inhabitants in 2010.
