= Anna-Lena Löfgren =

Swedish singer

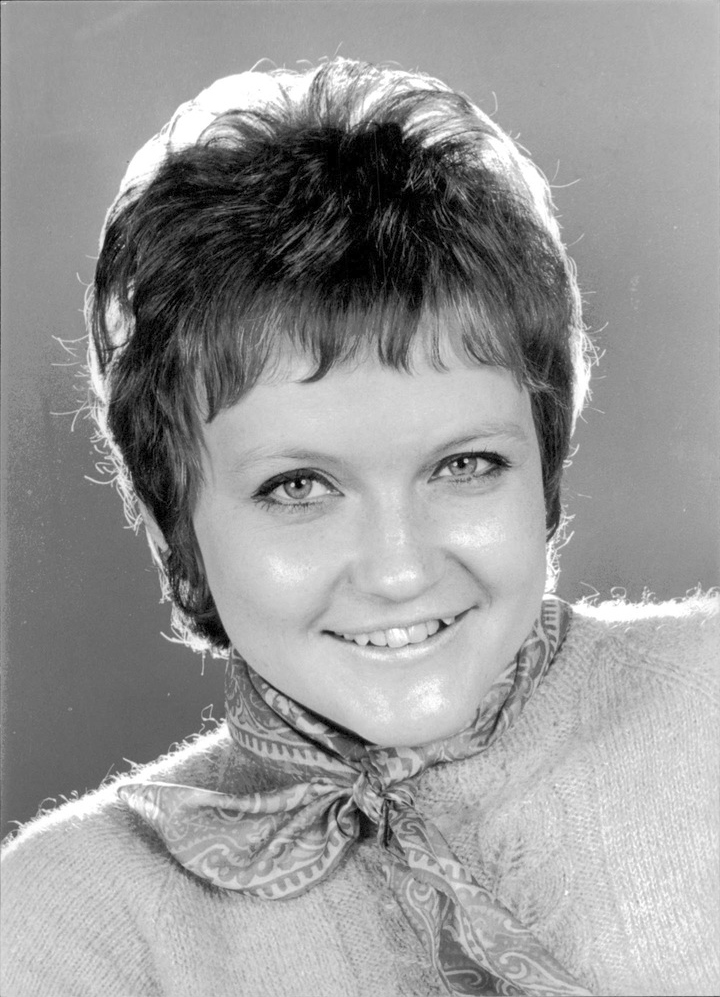
- Anna-Lena Löfgren (1971)

Background information
- Born: 1 May 1944; Stockholm, Sweden
- Died: 21 May 2010 (aged 66) Rånäs, Sweden
- Genres: Gospel; Schlager
- Occupation: Singer
- Years active: 1962–2010

Anna-Lena Löfgren (1 May 1944 – 21 May 2010) was a Swedish singer from Stockholm. During the years 1962 and 1995, more than 40 of her songs made it onto Svensktoppen, the record chart of Sveriges Radio. Löfgren became one of the most best known schlager singers in Sweden during the 1960s.

She made her first public appearance on the radio show Barnens brevlåda in the 1950s. A few years later Löfgren was discovered by the Swedish rock singer Rock-Olga at the nightspot Nalen in Stockholm. Her breakthrough came soon after in 1962 with the song "Regniga natt", which was certified gold (sold more than 100,000 copies) and topped that year's Svensktoppen.

The success continued with her following singles, including "Se mig i ögonen älskling", "Måndag måndag", "Kärlek på lasarett", and "Det finns ingenting att hämta". The biggest hit of her career was the song "Lyckliga gatan" ("Happy Street"), which was released in 1967 and was certified gold in Sweden and platinum and diamond in Norway. It used the melody of the famous Italian song "Il ragazzo della via Gluck" ("The Boy from Gluck Street") by Adriano Celentano, but with Swedish lyrics. According to Dagens Nyheter, "in her lifetime she was able to perform the song thousands of times from various scenes." Löfgren also recorded a German version of the song, called "Immer am Sonntag". During the 1960s, she also scored successes in the German-speaking world. She was successful in West Germany, releasing more than 22 songs for the West German market, including her arguably most popular, 'Abschiednehmen Ist So Schwer", which was a cover of Neil Sedaka's "Breaking Up Is Hard to Do".

Löfgren participated in Melodifestivalen in 1963 (with "Säg varför") and in 1968 (with "Jag vill tro").

In the 1980s she moved to Rånäs outside of Stockholm, where she resided until her death. Her address was "Lyckliga gatan" (Happy Street), like her famous song. Her last song to chart on Svensktoppen was "Välkommen till Pireus" in 1995. She stopped touring in 2005.

Her second husband was pianist Arne William Benny Löf, father of murder victim Erika Lööf.
