= Jerring =

Jerring may refer to:

- Jerring Award, Swedish sports award established by Sveriges Radio
- Sven Jerring, Swedish radio man
