= Sätt dig på bocken =

Song
- Language: Swedish
- Genre: children, Christmas
- Songwriter: Einar Nerman
- Composer: Einar Nerman

"Sätt dig på bocken", or "Resan till Pepparkakeland", is a Swedish Christmas song, written by Einar Nerman and published in Morfars visor.

The song is partly known for being sung by four-year old Ingela "Pling" Forsman in Sveriges Radio children's radio program Barnens brevlåda.

== Publication ==
- Lek med toner, 1971 (as "Resan till Pepparkakeland")

== Recordings ==
The song has been recorded by Solveig Linnér as well as Kerstin Andeby's children's choir & Peter Wanngren's orchestra, for the 2005 album Julskivan.
