= Lotten Rönquist =

Swedish artist

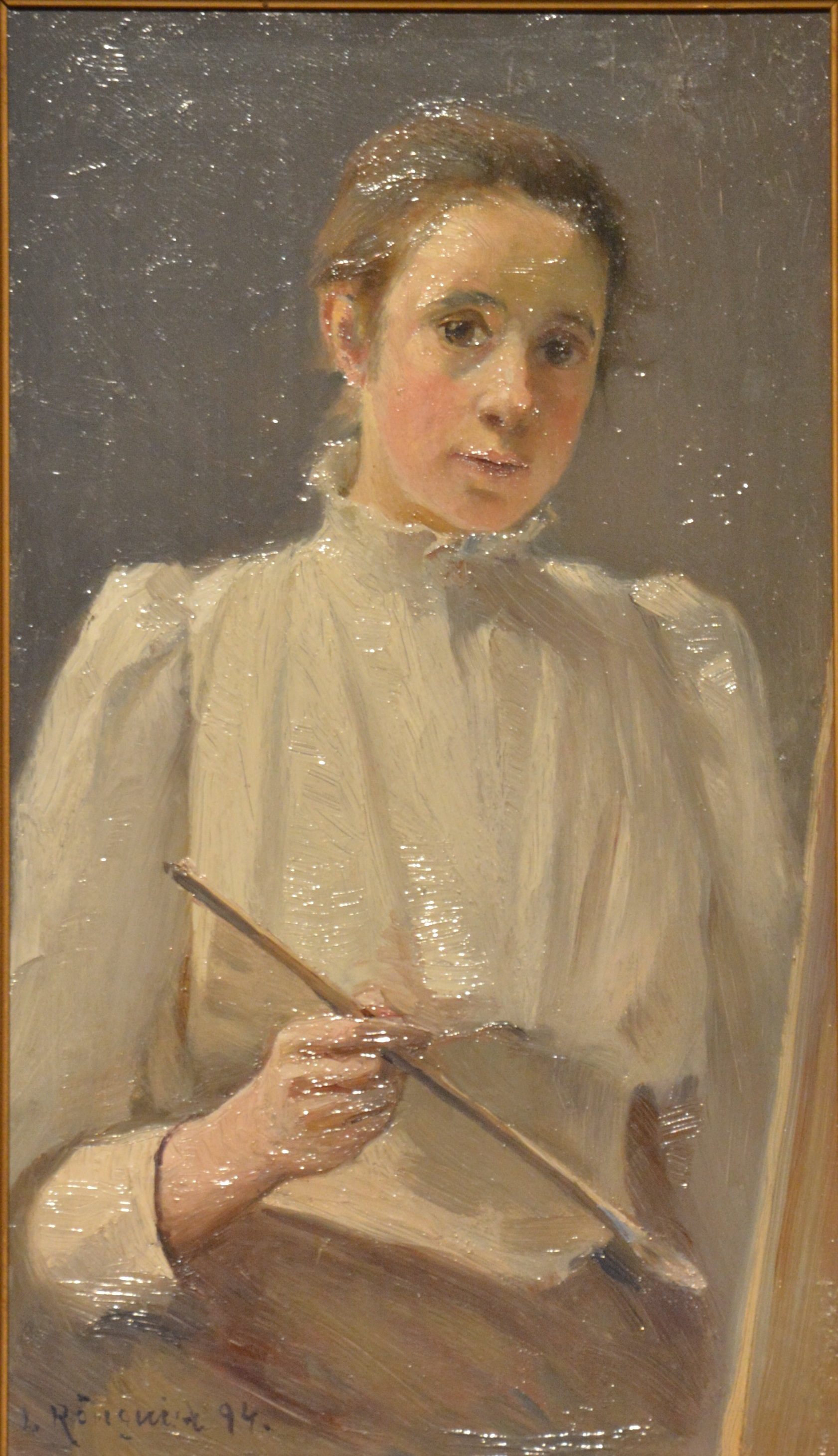
Lotten Rönquist, self portrait (1894)

Charlotta (Lotten) Sofia Rönquist (1864 – 1912) was a Swedish painter who was active in the late 19th and early 20th centuries. After attending the Swedish Academy, she completed her studies in France and Italy. Her paintings include portraits and interiors as well as landscapes and cityscapes depicting scenes from both Sweden and abroad. Rönquist also created large decorative works for hotels, manor houses and churches. She exhibited frequently from 1886 until shortly before her death. Works by Rönquist are in the collection of Stockholm's Nationalmuseum.

== Biography ==
Born in Uddevalla on 4 July 1864, Charlotta Sofia Rönquist was the daughter of the physician Hugo Fabian Rönquist and his wife Maria Sofia née Gellin. She was one of the family's six children.

After schooling in Uddevalla and at Stockholm's Technical College (1880–1884), she studied at the Royal Academy from 1884 to 1890. She went on to study first in France and then Italy where she remained for five years. Works from this period include Tvätterskor and Romerska Modeller. On returning to Stockholm, she painted some of her best works in the 1890s. These included miniature portraits, interiors, landscapes and still lifes. Here Swedish works included landscapes of the Väddö Canal, Visby and winter scenes. She also painted old farmhouses including Bakgården with a sunlit haystack and Gammalgård in Uddevalla. One of the last works she exhibited was the miniature Bagnaia i sol (Bagnaia in the Sun), presented at the Women Artist's exhibition in 1911.

Rönquist painted decorative works for Stockholm's Grand Hotel, Tjolöholm Castle and Steninge Palace as well as an altarpiece painting for the church Gudmundrå, Kramfors Municipality. She also designed a cartoon for the Friends of Handicraft as a gift for Queen Viktoria from Sveriges Landshövdingsfruar (or wives of Sweden's provincial governors).

On 14 May 1912, at the height of her career, Lotten Rönquist died of pneumonia only 48 years old. That autumn, a commemorative exhibition of her work was held in Stockholm.
