= Hästängen =

- Location within Stockholm Location within Sweden Location within European Union
- Coordinates: 59°38′19″N 18°40′0″E
- Country: Sweden
- Province: Uppland
- County: Stockholm County
- Municipality: Norrtälje Municipality

Area
  - Total: 0.244 km^{2} (0.094 sq mi)

Population (2020)
  - Total: 743
- Time zone: UTC+1 (CET)
  - Summer (DST): UTC+2 (CEST)

Hästängen is a locality situated in Norrtälje Municipality, Stockholm County, Sweden. Since 2015, the settlement has been constituted as its own urban area, having previously being counted as part of the urban area of Bergshamra. As early as 1960, Statistics Sweden described Hästängen as a "place which, in terms of built-up area, meets the conditions to be counted as an urban area but where the number of inhabitants has been found to be 150 but less than 200." The town then had 163 inhabitants.
