= Gunilla Wolde =

Swedish writer and illustrator

- Born: Barbro Gunilla Kristina Brorsson; July 15, 1939; Gothenburg, Sweden
- Died: 15 April 2015 (aged 75); Köpingsvik Parish, Sweden
- Occupations: writer, illustrator
- Writing career
- Language: Swedish
- Genre: children
- Notable works: Tommy, Betsy

Barbro Gunilla Kristina Wolde (July 15, 1939 – April 15, 2015) was a Swedish writer and illustrator.

== Early life ==
She was born in Gothenburg in 1939. Her mother, Gunnel Brorsson (née Vestergren) was a nurse and a journalist, and her father, Gabriel Brorsson, was a former sailor who had become a farmer and a merchant. The family lived on a farm in Älmsta in Roslagen, on the coast north of Stockholm.

== Career ==
She went through the University College of Arts, Crafts and Design (Konstfack) in Stockholm, and then worked as a caricaturist and satirical political illustrator for newspapers and magazines including Dagens Nyheter, Svenska Dagbladet, Aftonbladet and the men's magazine Lektyr.

Starting in the late 1960s, Wolde wrote and illustrated several series of books for small children, including the picture books about Totte ("Tommy" in the English translations) and Emma ("Betsy"). The books are centered around everyday situations in the life of a small child. The first book about Totte was born out of a series of drawings Wolde made for her son when he was a year and a half old. At the time, picture books often depicted animals or fairy stories, and Wolde's next door neighbour, the publisher Harriet Alfons, saw the potential in a picture book about a little boy struggling to put on his outdoor clothes, a scene that many parents and children would recognise. In 1969 the book Totte går ut was published. The Emma character was partly based on Wolde herself as a child.

The books about Totte and Emma have been frequently republished in Swedish, and translated into 14 languages.

When Wolde's children had grown up, she stopped writing about Totte and Emma, changing her focus to books about horses written for an older audience. She had learnt to ride as a child, and remained interested in horses all her life, working as a riding instructor from the farm in Grillby where her family lived for some time in the 1980s and 1990s.

== Personal life ==
She was married to Rolf Gustafsson between 1957 and 1962, and to Peter Wolde between 1965 and 1999. She had three children.

Wolde lived in Köpingsvik, Öland for the last period of her life. She died in April 2015 following a period of illness.
