= Bergshamra =

Bergshamra may refer to:

- Bergshamra, Norrtälje - a locality in Norrtälje Municipality, Stockholm County, Sweden
- Bergshamra, Solna - a suburb in Solna Municipality, Stockholm County, Sweden.
