= Alexandra Larsson =

Argentine model

- Born: August 16, 1986 (age 40); Spillersboda, Norrtälje, Stockholm, Sweden
- Modeling information
- Height: 5 ft 7 in (1.72 m)
- Hair color: Blonde
- Eye color: Green

Alexandra Charlotte Larsson, (Spillersboda, Norrtälje Municipality, Stockholm County, Sweden; born August 16, 1986) is a model, based in Argentina, where she is commonly referred to as "La Sueca" (The Swede).

She has appeared on fashion runways, commercials, TV programs, and magazine covers.

== Biography ==
Larsson (who also has a twin brother) was born in a small town in Sweden, and moved to Argentina in approximately 2008 to study Spanish. She first worked in a call center, and after some auditions she landed her first television appearance in 2011, on Sábado Bus hosted by Nicolás Repetto.

In January 2012, she participated in the TV program Conexiones interviewing show business people and athletes in Canal 13.

Starting in April 2012, she appeared on Bailando 2012 from Showmatch (the Argentine version of Dancing with the Stars), a television program high ratings in Argentina, which greatly increased her popularity. She has also appeared on Periodismo para todos.

In October 2012, she participated in charity event M5K Las Mujeres Corremos organized by McDonald's along with other mainstream Argentine artists. She credits her slim figure in part to her restricted diet, caused by having celiac disease.

== TV appearances ==
- Sábado Bus (2011)
- Bailando por un Sueño 2012 (replacing Karina Jelinek. - 2012)
- Toda Pasión, hosted by Sergio Gendler and Juan Manuel "Rifle" Varela (2012)
- Showmatch (appeared on beach soccer - 2012)
- 70 20 13 (Interview by journalist Chiche Gelblung - 2012)
- Este es el Show (2012)
- Sábado Show (2012)
- Periodismo para todos, hosted by Jorge Lanata (2012-2013)
