= Nysättra =

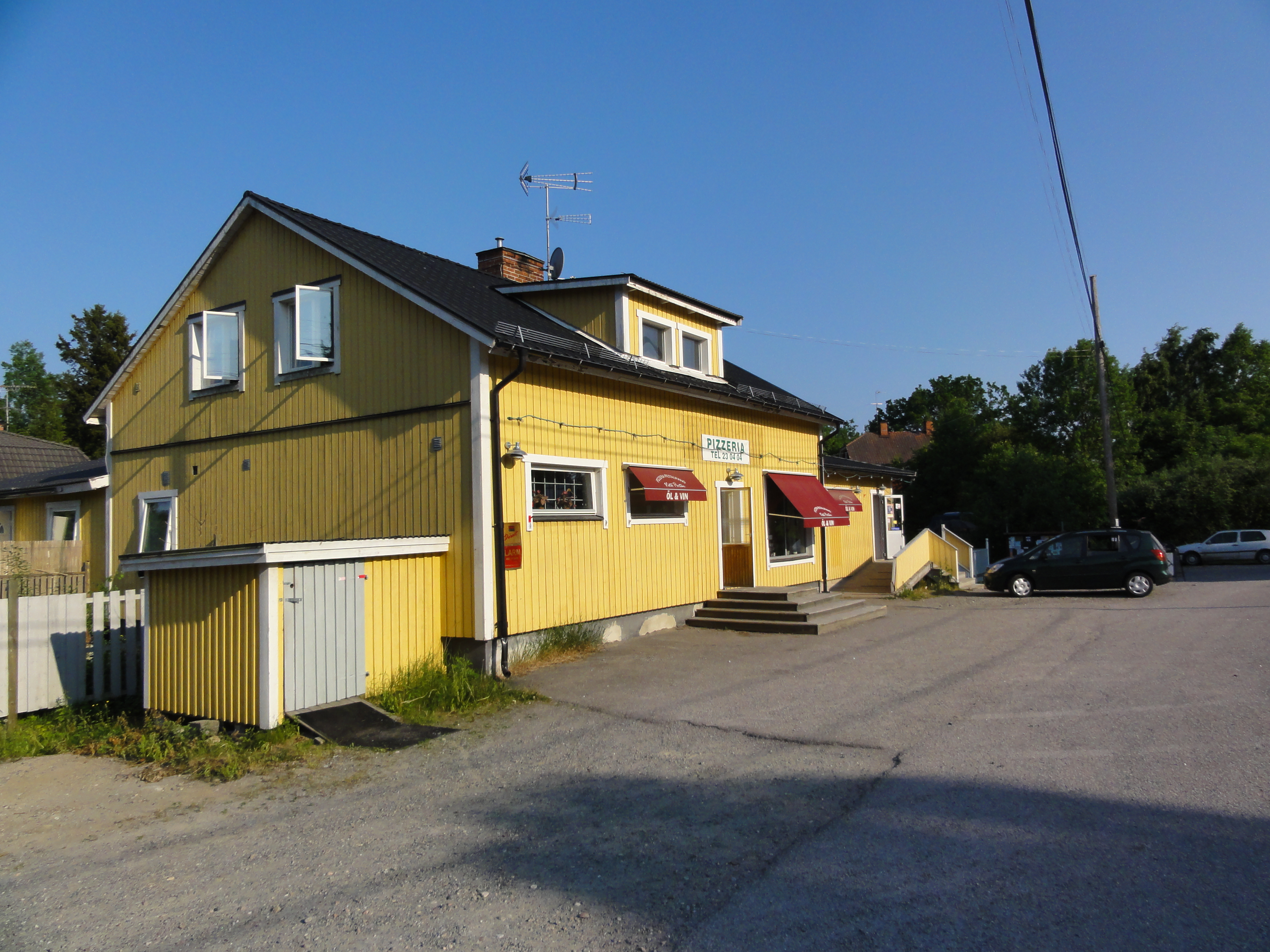
- A local pizzeria in the village of Nysätta

- Location within Stockholm Location within Sweden Location within European Union
- Coordinates: 59.8121°N 18.8975°E
- Country: Sweden
- Province: Uppland
- County: Stockholm County
- Municipality: Norrtälje Municipality

Area
  - Total: 1.390 km^{2} (0.537 sq mi)

Population (31 December 2020)
  - Total: 268
  - Density: 193/km^{2} (499/sq mi)
- Time zone: UTC+1 (CET)
  - Summer (DST): UTC+2 (CEST)

Nysättra is a locality situated in Norrtälje Municipality, Stockholm County, Sweden. Since 2015, Statistics Sweden has demarcated an urban area for this settlement.
