= Gräddö =

Coordinates: 59°46′N 19°02′E

Gräddö Nabbo, Gräddö och Rävsnäs
- Nabbo, Gräddö and Rävsnäs
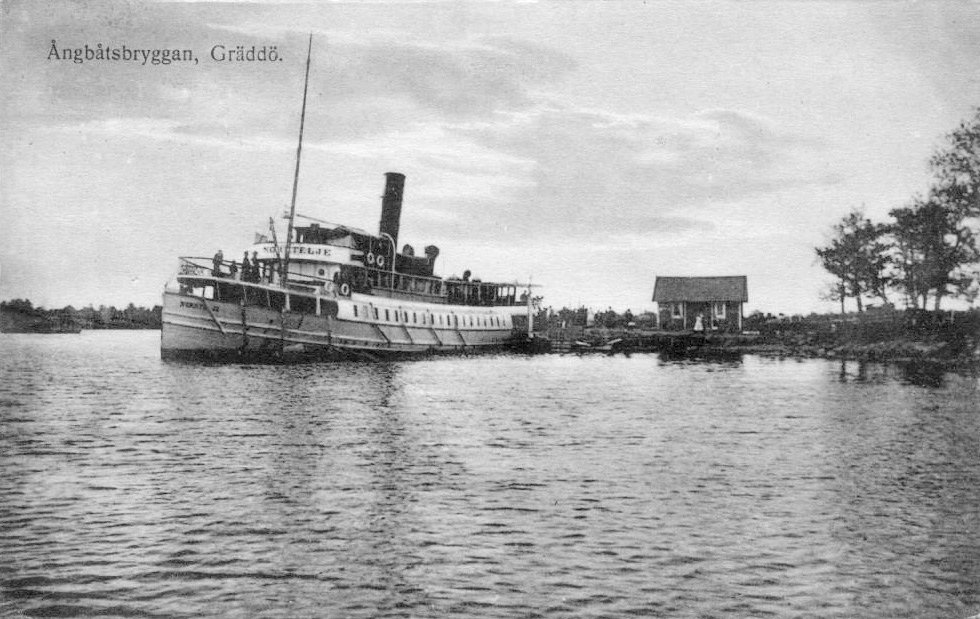
- The steamboat pier at Gräddö, around 1910
- Interactive map of Gräddö
- Country: Sweden
- Province (Landskap): Uppland
- County: Stockholm county
- Municipality: Norrtälje Municipality
- District: Rådmansö district

Area
  - Total: 5.84 km^{2} (2.25 sq mi)

Population
  - Total: 579
  - Density: 99/km^{2} (260/sq mi)

Gräddö is a locality in Rådmansö parish in Norrtälje Municipality in Roslagen.

== History ==
Gräddö was first mentioned in documents in 1547.

In 1739, the Swedish troops intended to be deployed in the War of the Hats embarked from here.

In August 1809, the Swedish expeditionary force sailed from Gräddö to Ratan in Västerbotten to stop the Russian army from invading.

At the end of the 19th century, Gräddö became a popular tourist destination and a number of towered summer houses were built in the area. Several guest houses were also started, Sjömans, Söderbergs, Strands, Skogshyddan, Ida Bergströms and Björkö örn. Gräddö also got a hot bath house, which, however, was moved to Gräddö-Asken in 1920. In 1933 Gräddö mission house was moved to its current location, after having previously been built in 1868 at Nabbo.

The shipyard at Gräddö was founded in 1924. The shipyard built exclusive motorboats until the 1960s.

In 1959, Viking Line started ferry traffic from Gräddö to Mariehamn on Åland and on to Galtby, Korpo in Finland (Åboland archipelago). The following year, the traffic was moved to Kapellskär as the departure port in Sweden.

In 2015, Statistics Sweden demarcated an urban area named by Statistics Sweden as Nabbo, Gräddö and Rävsnäs. The settlement also includes the nearby towns of Rävsnäs and Nabbo.

== Gallery ==
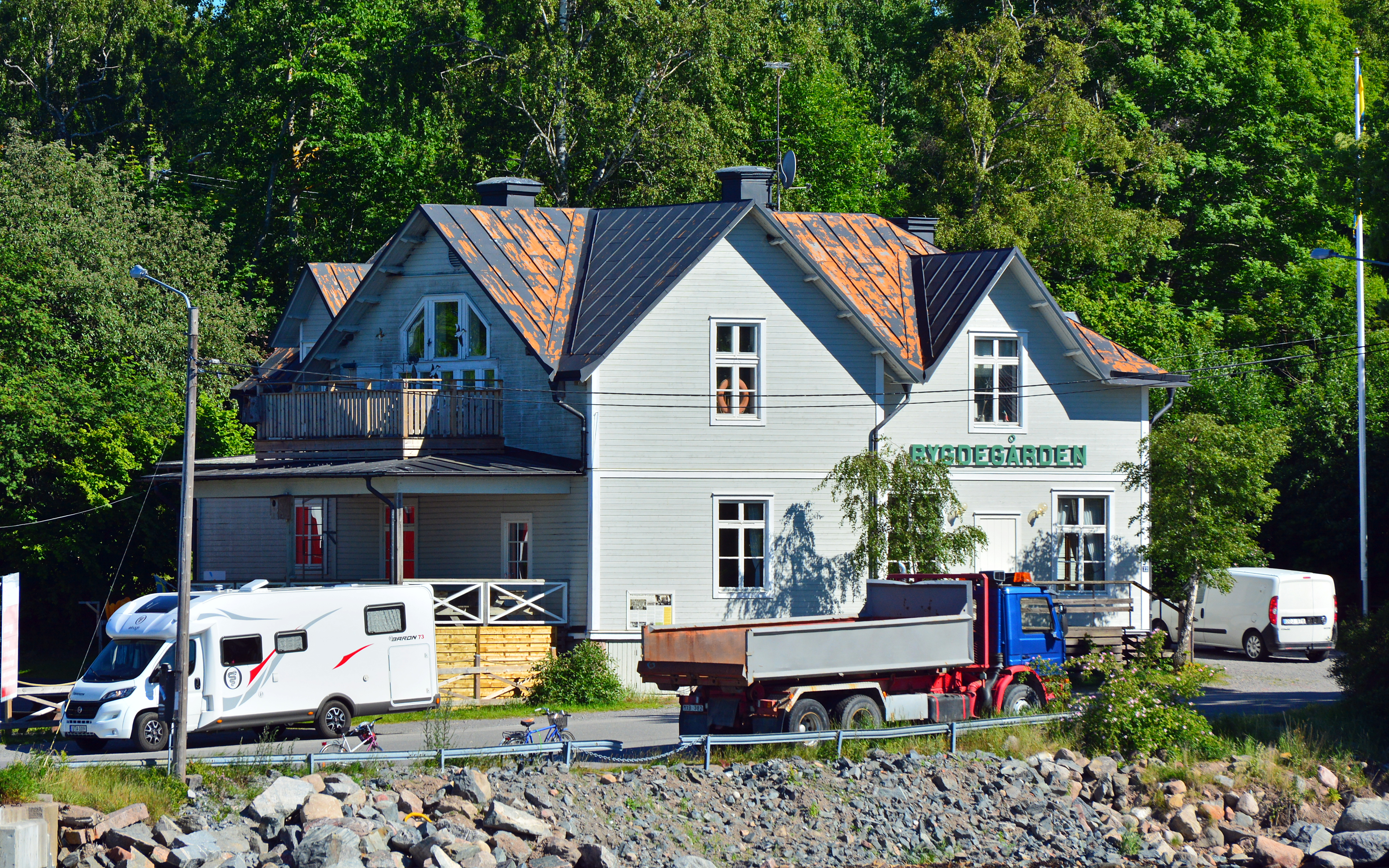
The community center at Gräddö.

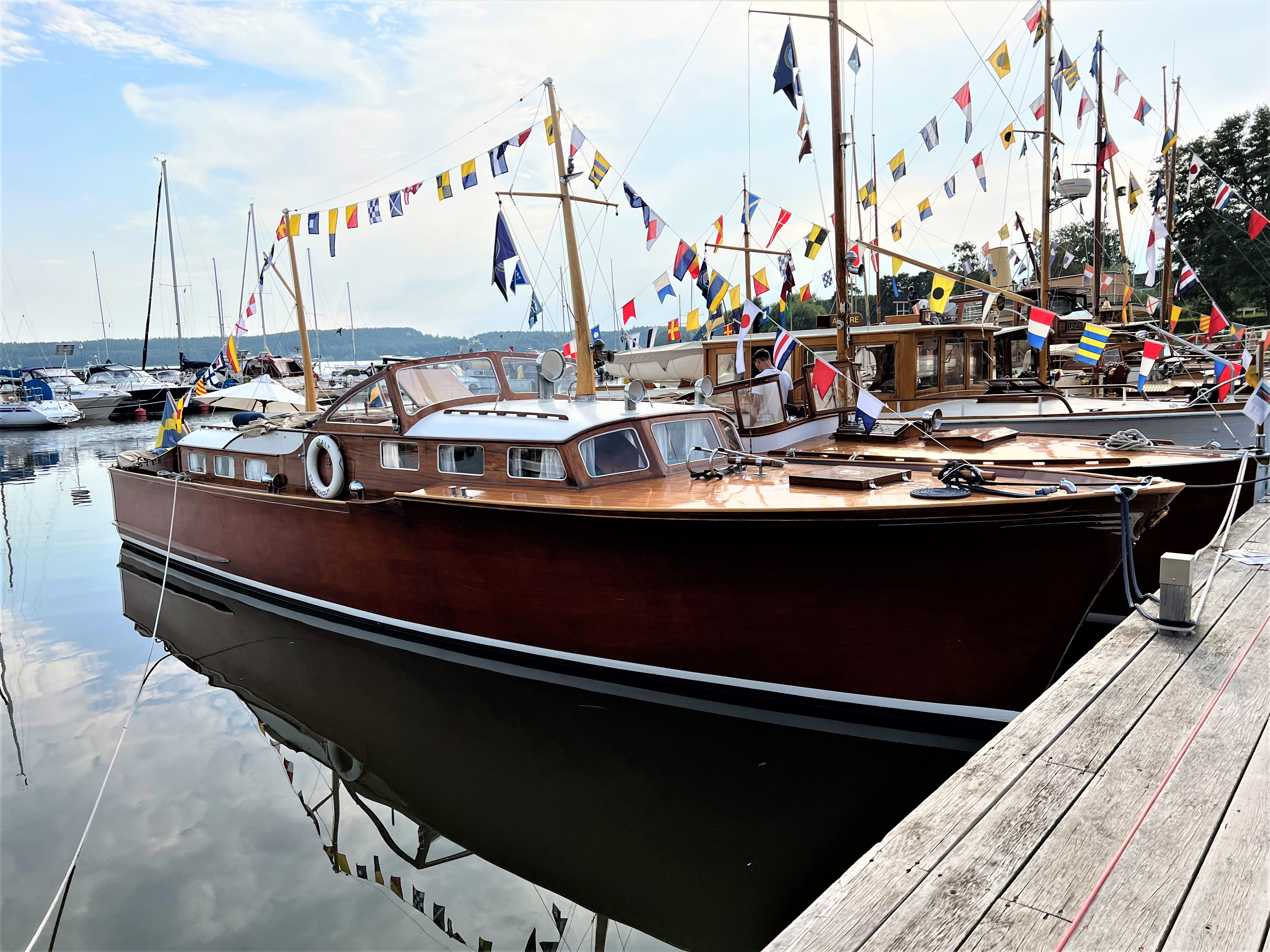
M/Y Salt designed by Knud H Reimers in 1938 and built at Gräddö shipyard.
