= Älmsta =

- Location within Stockholm Location within Sweden Location within European Union
- Coordinates: 59°58′N 18°48′E
- Country: Sweden
- Province: Uppland
- County: Stockholm County
- Municipality: Norrtälje Municipality

Area
  - Total: 1.20 km^{2} (0.46 sq mi)

Population (31 December 2020)
  - Total: 1,532
  - Density: 1,280/km^{2} (3,310/sq mi)
- Time zone: UTC+1 (CET)
  - Summer (DST): UTC+2 (CEST)

Älmsta or Elmsta is a locality situated in Norrtälje Municipality, Stockholm County, Sweden. It had 924 inhabitants in 2005 and 1,097 in 2010. Elmsta is the old Swedish name, which has become more popular again (e.g. names of stores), while Älmsta still is the official name.

Älmsta is situated at the northern end of the Väddö Canal, an artificial canal first dug in the 16th century to provide a sheltered passage between the Bagghusfjärden to the south and the Väddöviken to the north. The canal has been rebuilt on several occasions since and is still used by some 22,000 boats annually. Part of Älmsta lies on the island of Väddö, separated from the mainland by the canal.
