= Skebobruk =

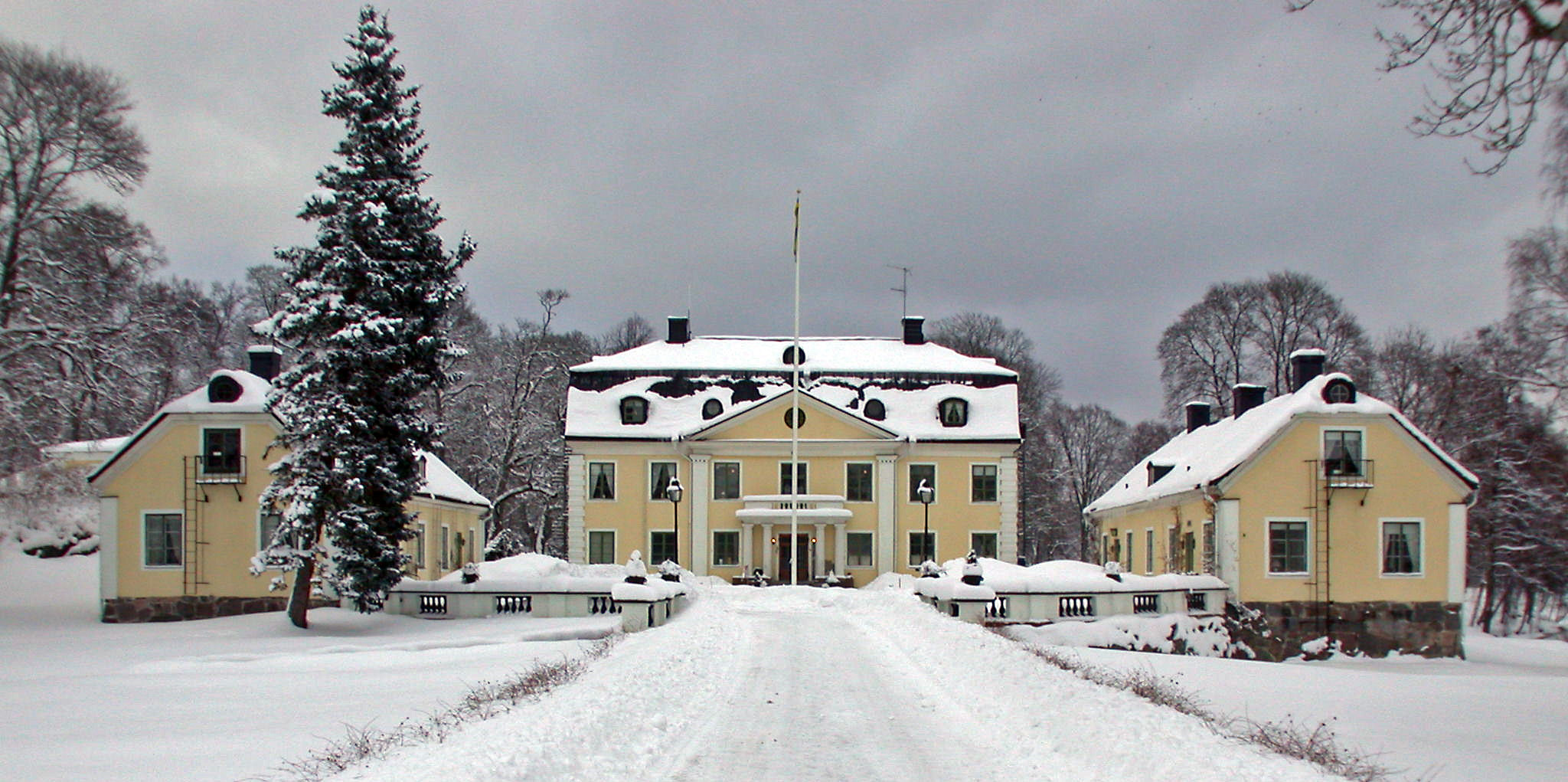
- Skebobruk mansion

- Location within Stockholm Location within Sweden
- Coordinates: 59°58′N 18°36′E
- Country: Sweden
- Province: Uppland
- County: Stockholm County
- Municipality: Norrtälje Municipality

Area
  - Total: 1.32 km^{2} (0.51 sq mi)

Population (31 December 2020)
  - Total: 231
  - Density: 175/km^{2} (453/sq mi)
- Time zone: UTC+1 (CET)
  - Summer (DST): UTC+2 (CEST)

Skebobruk is a locality situated in Norrtälje Municipality, Stockholm County, Sweden with 282 inhabitants in 2010.
