= Väddö =

Swedish island

Coordinates: 60°00′N 18°50′E

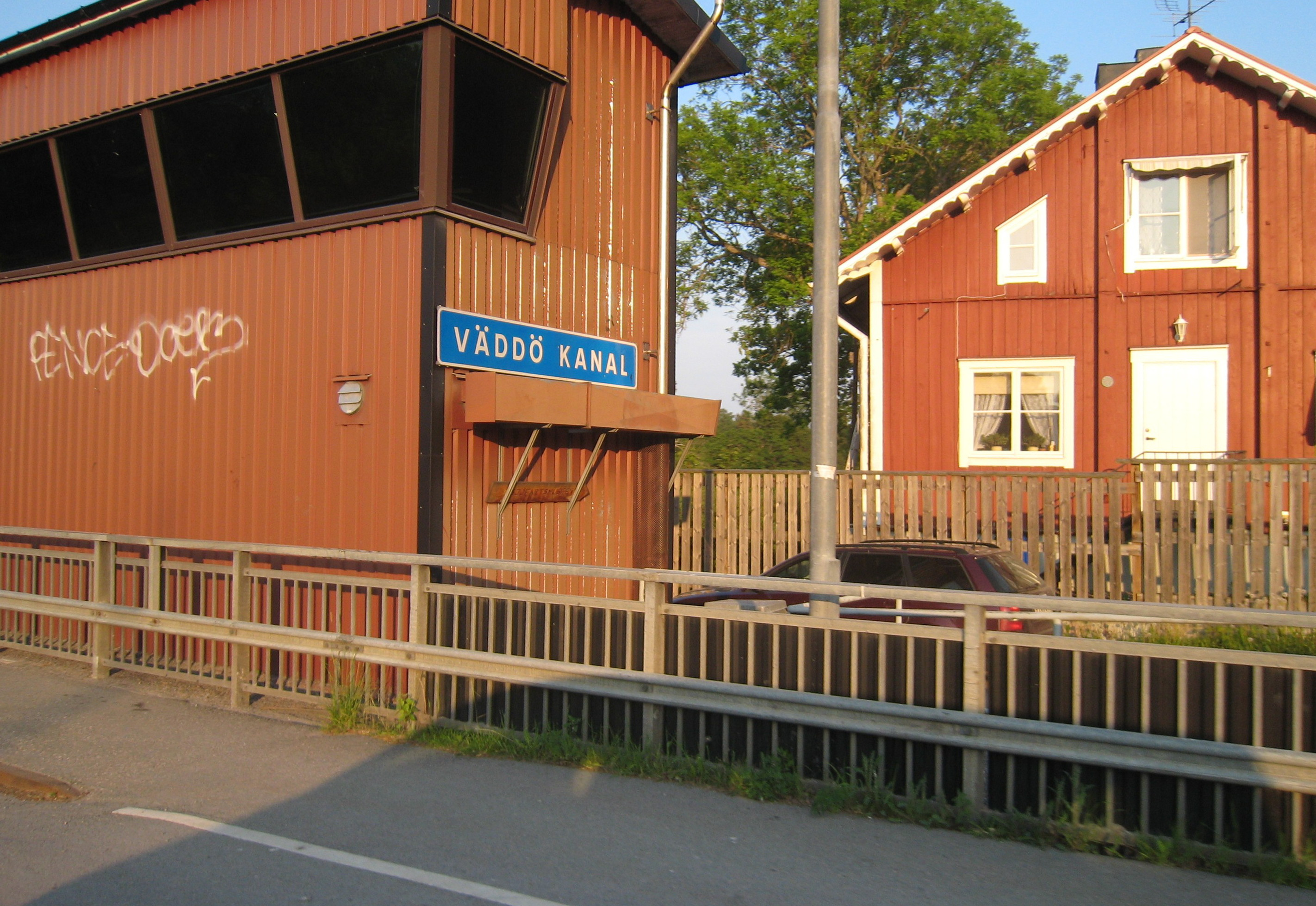
Väddö Canal.

Väddö is an island in the Baltic Sea in Roslagen district, Sweden. It is situated in Norrtälje Municipality. Together with the adjoined Björkö it is considered the seventh largest island of Sweden.

Väddö is separated from the mainland by the artificial Väddö Canal, first dug in the 16th century.

== See also ==
- Geography of Sweden
- Islands of Sweden
