= Söderby-Karl =

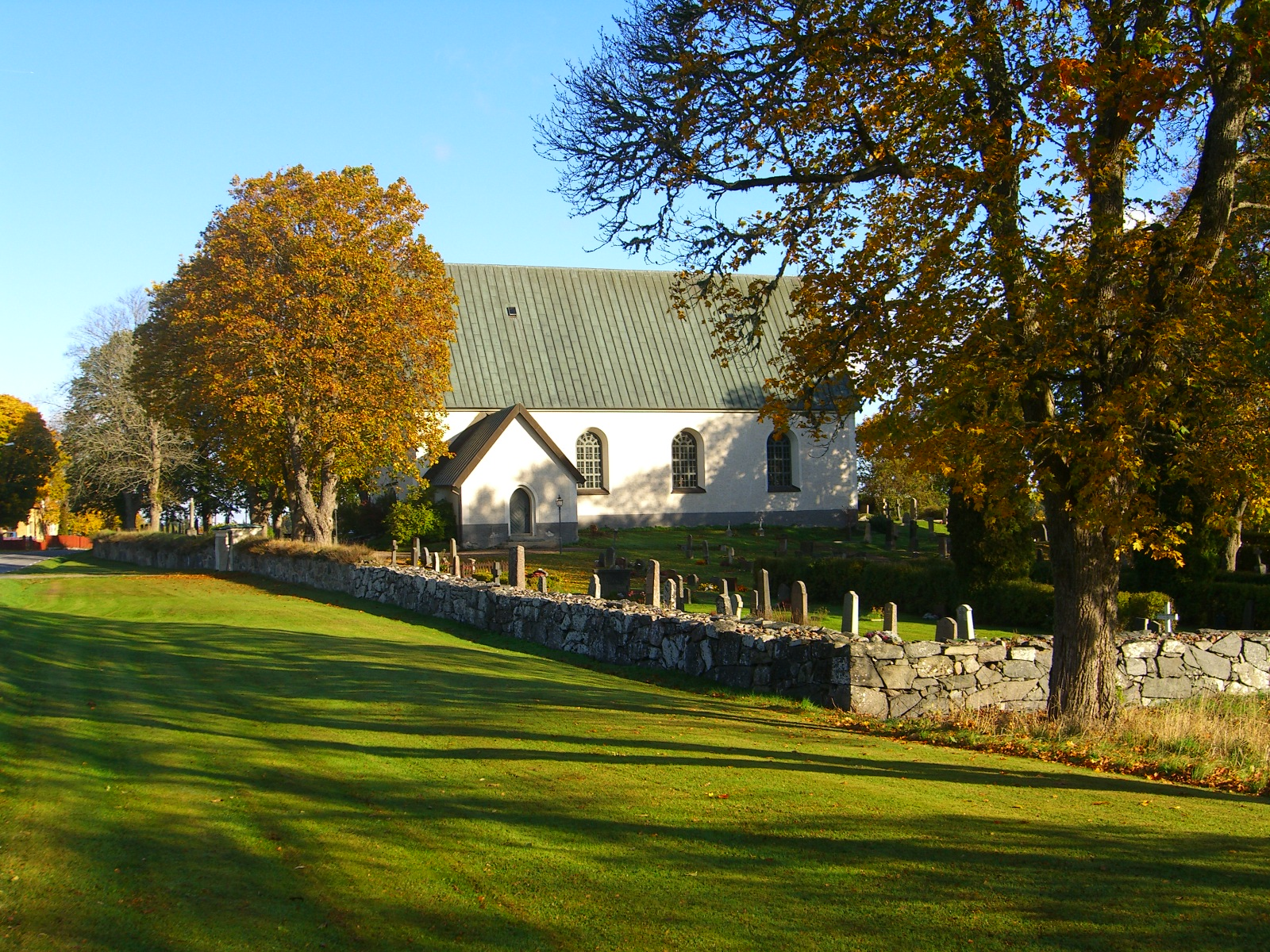
- Söderby-Karl Church

- Location within Stockholm Location within Sweden
- Coordinates: 59°53′11″N 18°41′58″E
- Country: Sweden
- Province: Uppland
- County: Stockholm County
- Municipality: Norrtälje Municipality

Area
  - Total: 0.67 km^{2} (0.26 sq mi)

Population (31 December 2010)
  - Total: 231
  - Density: 345/km^{2} (890/sq mi)
- Time zone: UTC+1 (CET)
  - Summer (DST): UTC+2 (CEST)

Söderby-Karl is a locality situated in Norrtälje Municipality, Stockholm County, Sweden with 231 inhabitants in 2010.

Söderby-Karl Church, dating from the Middle Ages, lies in Söderby-Karl.
