= Spillersboda =

- Location within Stockholm Location within Sweden Location within European Union
- Coordinates: 59°42′N 18°51′E
- Country: Sweden
- Province: Uppland
- County: Stockholm County
- Municipality: Norrtälje Municipality

Area
  - Total: 1.25 km^{2} (0.48 sq mi)

Population (31 December 2020)
  - Total: 493
  - Density: 394/km^{2} (1,020/sq mi)
- Time zone: UTC+1 (CET)
  - Summer (DST): UTC+2 (CEST)

Spillersboda is a locality situated in Norrtälje Municipality, Stockholm County, Sweden with 314 inhabitants in 2005.

== People born or living in Spillersboda ==
- Alexandra Larsson (Swedish model based in Argentina)
