= Svanberga =

- Location within Stockholm Location within Sweden Location within European Union
- Coordinates: 59°50′N 18°39′E
- Country: Sweden
- Province: Uppland
- County: Stockholm County
- Municipality: Norrtälje Municipality

Area
  - Total: 0.58 km^{2} (0.22 sq mi)

Population (31 December 2020)
  - Total: 563
  - Density: 970/km^{2} (2,500/sq mi)
- Time zone: UTC+1 (CET)
  - Summer (DST): UTC+2 (CEST)

Svanberga is a locality in Norrtälje Municipality, Stockholm County, Sweden. It is situated about 10 kilometres (6.2 mi) north of downtown Norrtälje, and on the eastern shore of the Erken lake. It had 501 inhabitants in 2010.

== Climate ==
Svanberga has a humid continental climate (Köppen Dfb). It is located in a frost hollow and is prone to very cold temperatures in winter, often in brief spells, with highly variable patterns. In spring air frosts linger on until early May, while summer highs are quite warm.

Climate data for Svanberga (2002–2021 averages, extremes since 1995)
Month	Jan	Feb	Mar	Apr	May	Jun	Jul	Aug	Sep	Oct	Nov	Dec	Year
Record high °C (°F)	10.4 (50.7)	11.3 (52.3)	17.2 (63.0)	23.0 (73.4)	28.2 (82.8)	30.7 (87.3)	33.7 (92.7)	30.2 (86.4)	26.1 (79.0)	20.1 (68.2)	14.9 (58.8)	12.8 (55.0)	33.7 (92.7)
Mean maximum °C (°F)	6.2 (43.2)	7.3 (45.1)	12.9 (55.2)	18.5 (65.3)	23.3 (73.9)	27.1 (80.8)	28.5 (83.3)	26.9 (80.4)	22.3 (72.1)	16.1 (61.0)	10.7 (51.3)	7.4 (45.3)	29.4 (84.9)
Mean daily maximum °C (°F)	0.2 (32.4)	0.9 (33.6)	4.6 (40.3)	10.7 (51.3)	15.8 (60.4)	20.1 (68.2)	22.9 (73.2)	21.5 (70.7)	16.7 (62.1)	10.1 (50.2)	5.2 (41.4)	2.0 (35.6)	10.9 (51.6)
Daily mean °C (°F)	−3.0 (26.6)	−3.0 (26.6)	−0.2 (31.6)	4.8 (40.6)	9.7 (49.5)	14.0 (57.2)	16.9 (62.4)	15.9 (60.6)	11.8 (53.2)	6.4 (43.5)	2.5 (36.5)	−0.8 (30.6)	6.3 (43.2)
Mean daily minimum °C (°F)	−6.2 (20.8)	−6.8 (19.8)	−5.0 (23.0)	−1.2 (29.8)	3.5 (38.3)	7.9 (46.2)	10.9 (51.6)	10.3 (50.5)	6.8 (44.2)	2.7 (36.9)	−0.2 (31.6)	−3.6 (25.5)	1.6 (34.9)
Mean minimum °C (°F)	−20.4 (−4.7)	−19.0 (−2.2)	−16.3 (2.7)	−8.0 (17.6)	−3.4 (25.9)	1.3 (34.3)	4.5 (40.1)	3.2 (37.8)	−0.2 (31.6)	−5.8 (21.6)	−9.1 (15.6)	−14.3 (6.3)	−24.7 (−12.5)
Record low °C (°F)	−30.6 (−23.1)	−32.5 (−26.5)	−32.5 (−26.5)	−16.3 (2.7)	−8.4 (16.9)	−1.4 (29.5)	1.9 (35.4)	0.5 (32.9)	−3.2 (26.2)	−13.7 (7.3)	−25.6 (−14.1)	−31.6 (−24.9)	−32.5 (−26.5)
Average precipitation mm (inches)	44.2 (1.74)	31.3 (1.23)	27.7 (1.09)	27.4 (1.08)	45.0 (1.77)	58.3 (2.30)	57.6 (2.27)	68.9 (2.71)	47.3 (1.86)	54.5 (2.15)	55.1 (2.17)	51.6 (2.03)	568.9 (22.4)
Average precipitation days (≥ 1 mm)	10.8	8.0	6.6	6.0	8.1	8.4	8.2	9.2	8.6	9.9	10.9	11.6	106.3
Source 1: SMHI Open Data for Svanberga, precipitation
Source 2: SMHI Open Data for Svanberga, temperature
