= Edsbro Church =

Coordinates: 59°53′40″N 18°29′36″E

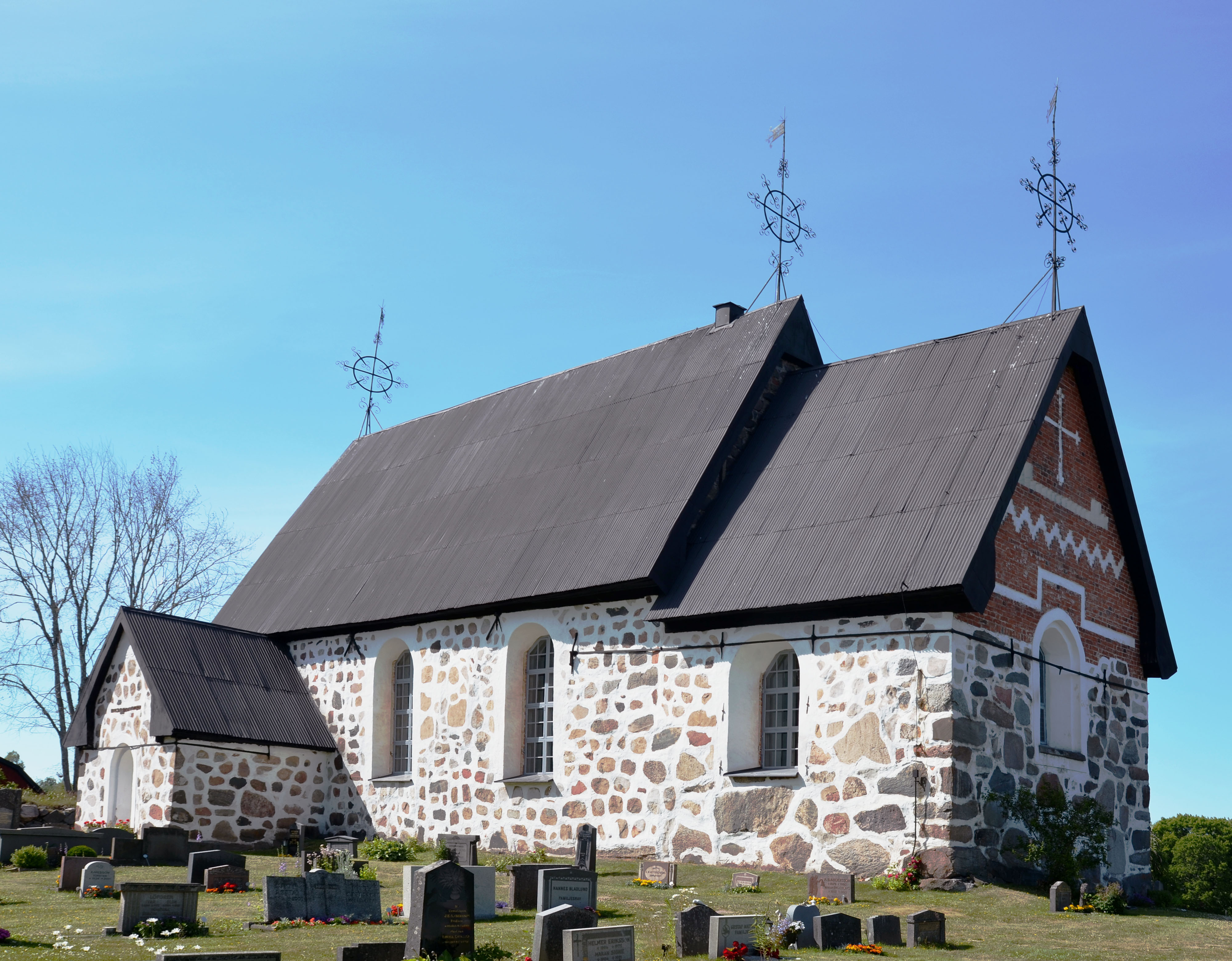
Edsbro Church, exterior

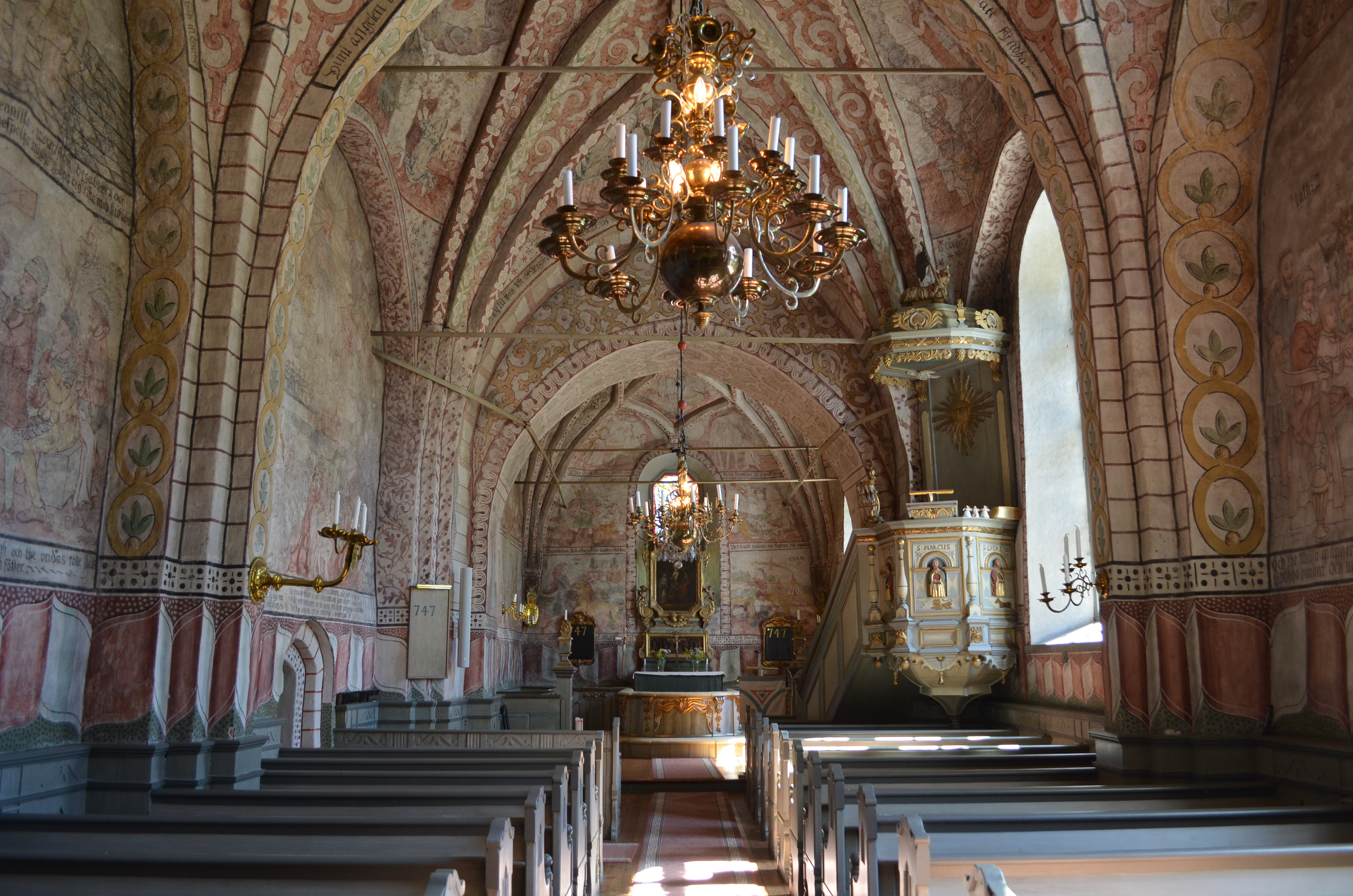
Edsbro Church, interior

Edsbro Church (Swedish: Edsbro kyrka) is a medieval church at Edsbro in Stockholm County, Sweden. It belongs to the Diocese of Uppsala of the Church of Sweden.

== History and architecture ==
The oldest part of the church is the nave, which was built in fieldstone during the 13th century. The sacristy was added during the 14th century and the choir was enlarged, with added details in Brick Gothic style, during the 15th century. Unusually, the church has preserved its northern wall without windows. Most medieval churches in the area originally lacked windows in their northern façade, but normally windows were opened during the subsequent centuries. Northwest of the church stands the bell tower which was erected in the middle of the 17th century. The interior is decorated with frescos added in the 17th century. They were paid for by the Lilliesparre family, owner of nearby Kragsta Manor. Among the church fittings is the 13th century baptismal font of sandstone with a base of limestone.

A major internal restoration was carried out in 1904 under the direction of the architect Bror E. Almquist (1864–1940). Subsequent restoration was carried out in 1951-1952 under the direction of conservator Sven Dalén. In 1970, the interior paintings were cleaned under the direction of conservator Bengt Grandin.
