= Edsbro =

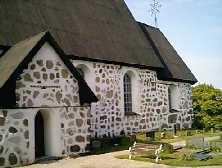
- Edsbro Church

- Location within Stockholm Location within Sweden Location within European Union
- Coordinates: 59°53′N 18°29′E
- Country: Sweden
- Province: Uppland
- County: Stockholm County
- Municipality: Norrtälje Municipality

Area
  - Total: 0.82 km^{2} (0.32 sq mi)

Population (31 December 2020)
  - Total: 591
  - Density: 720/km^{2} (1,900/sq mi)
- Time zone: UTC+1 (CET)
  - Summer (DST): UTC+2 (CEST)

Edsbro is a locality situated in Norrtälje Municipality, Stockholm County, Sweden with 488 inhabitants in 2010.

Medieval Edsbro Church lies in Edsbro.
