= Söderby-Karl Church =

Church in Söderby-Karl, Sweden

Coordinates: 59°53′03″N 18°42′02″E

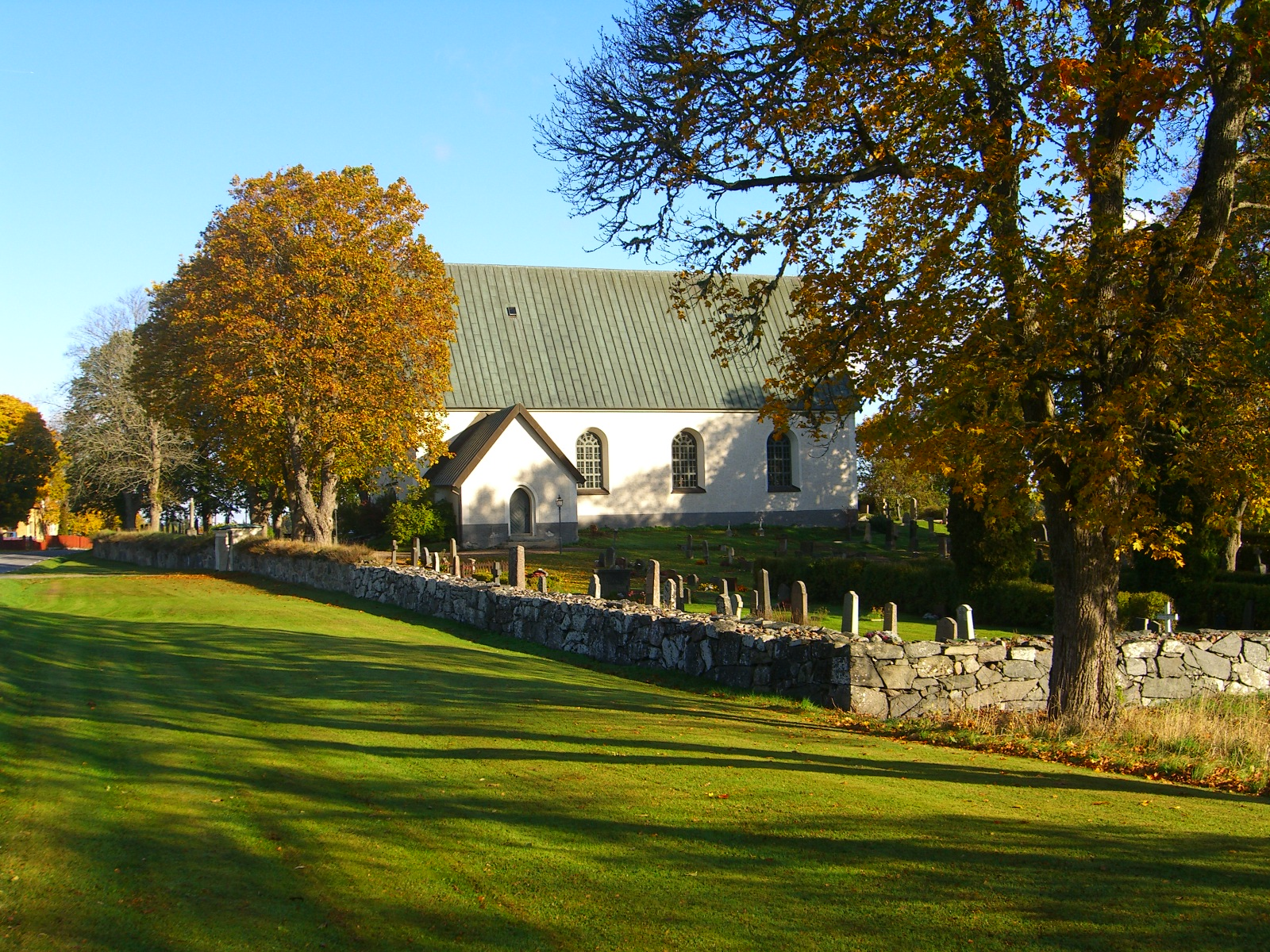
Söderby-Karl Church, view of the exterior

Söderby-Karl Church (Swedish: Söderby-Karls kyrka) is a medieval church belonging to the Church of Sweden in the Diocese of Uppsala. It lies in Söderby-Karl.

The church was built at the early 14th century and has been altered fairly little since then. A church porch has been added, probably already during the 14th century, but otherwise the church has retained its original size. The original wooden ceiling was replaced with brick vaults during the middle of the 15th century. The vaults were decorated with frescoes at the beginning of the 16th century. These were later painted over but rediscovered and partially restored during a renovation in 1910. The oldest item belonging to the church is the baptismal font, dating from the 13th century. The pulpit, dating from 1759, was probably made by Johan Ljung.
