= Riala =

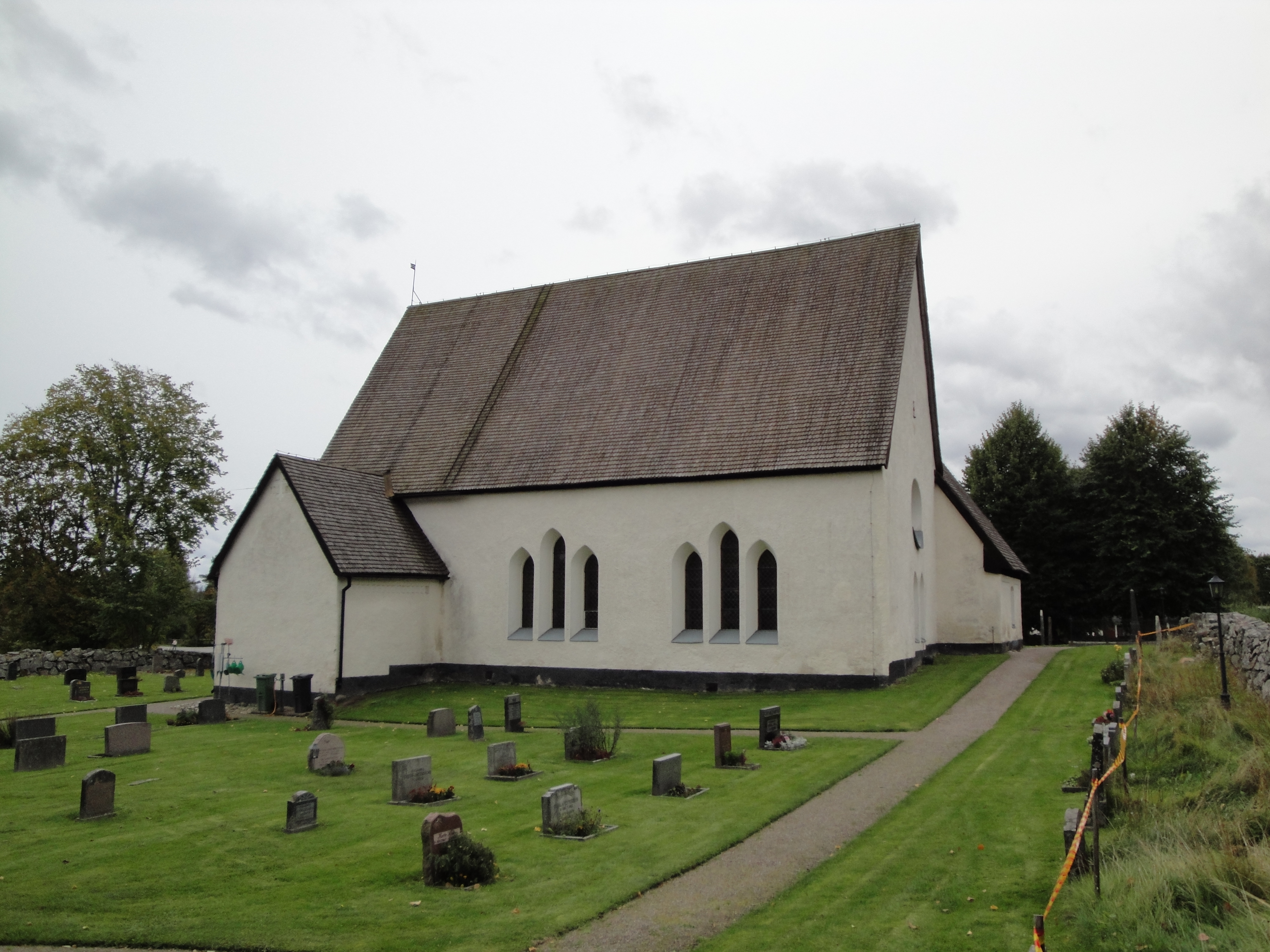
- Riala Church

- Location within Stockholm Location within Sweden Location within European Union
- Coordinates: 59°38′N 18°32′E
- Country: Sweden
- Province: Uppland
- County: Stockholm County
- Municipality: Norrtälje Municipality

Area
  - Total: 0.54 km^{2} (0.21 sq mi)

Population (31 December 2020)
  - Total: 361
  - Density: 670/km^{2} (1,700/sq mi)
- Time zone: UTC+1 (CET)
  - Summer (DST): UTC+2 (CEST)

Riala (Swedish pronunciation: [ˈrîːˌɑːla]) is a locality situated in Norrtälje Municipality, Stockholm County, Sweden with 215 inhabitants in 2010.
