= Rånäs =

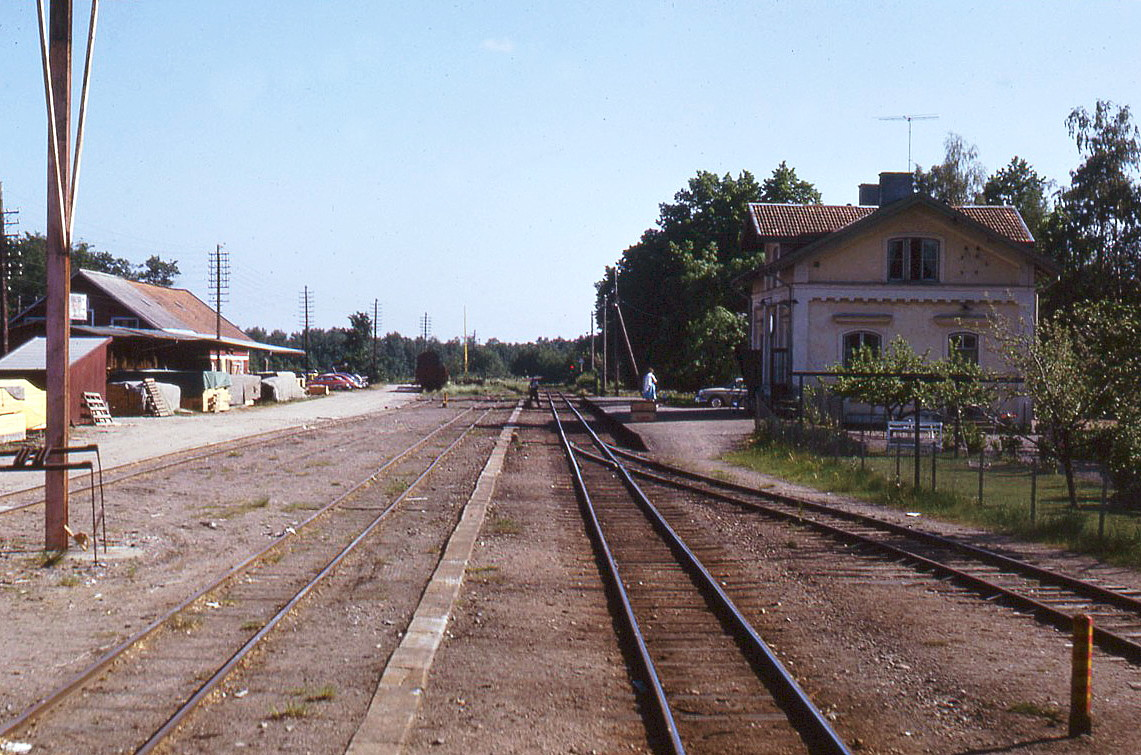
- Rånäs station

- Location within Stockholm Location within Sweden Location within European Union
- Coordinates: 59°48′N 18°17′E
- Country: Sweden
- Province: Uppland
- County: Stockholm County
- Municipality: Norrtälje Municipality

Area
  - Total: 0.55 km^{2} (0.21 sq mi)

Population (31 December 2020)
  - Total: 423
  - Density: 770/km^{2} (2,000/sq mi)
- Time zone: UTC+1 (CET)
  - Summer (DST): UTC+2 (CEST)

Rånäs is a locality situated in Norrtälje Municipality, Stockholm County, Sweden. It lies between the lakes of Skedviken and Gavel-Långsjön. It had 428 inhabitants in 2010.
