= Jerring Award =

Swedish sports award established by Sveriges Radio

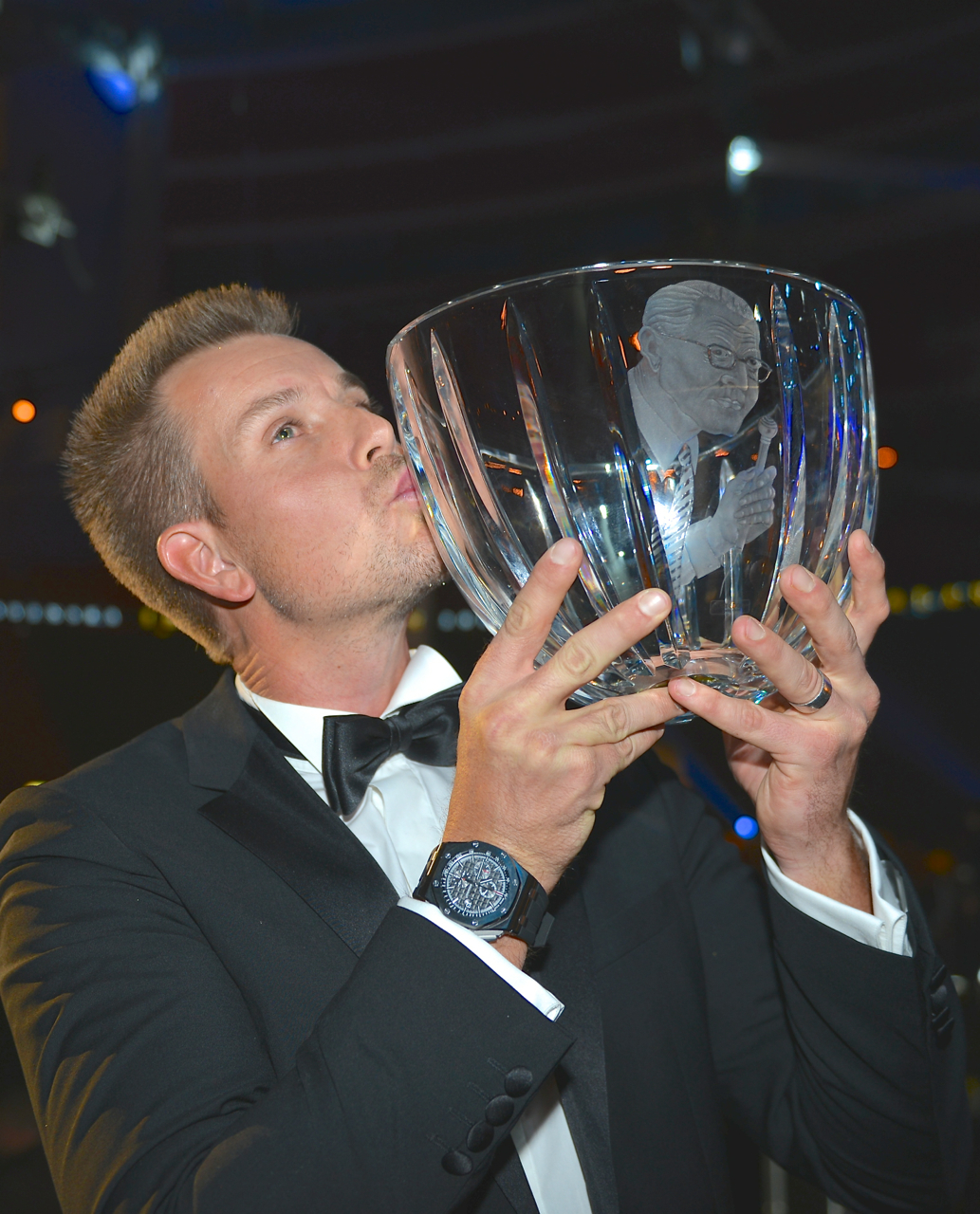
- Henrik Stenson winning the award of 2013 in January 2014
- Date: 1979-
- Location: Stockholm
- Country: Sweden
- Presented by: Sveriges Radio
- Website: https://sverigesradio.se/grupp/16930

The Jerring Award (Swedish: Jerringpriset or "Radiosportens Jerringpris") is a prize established by Radiosporten (the sport section of Sveriges Radio) and voted by its radio audience who choose the best performing Swedish athlete or team of the year. The prize is named after Swedish radio personality Sven Jerring. It is also called "the prize of the people", since it is the radio audience who vote. Criticism was made between 2010 and 2019 regarding a lack of amateur sport awards, leading to awards being given in golf and horse jumping

The prize was first awarded in 1979, the inaugural winner being the alpine skier Ingemar Stenmark. Biathlete Magdalena Forsberg holds the record number of wins with four awards. Biathlon is also the sport has had the winner the most times with 6.

== All winners ==
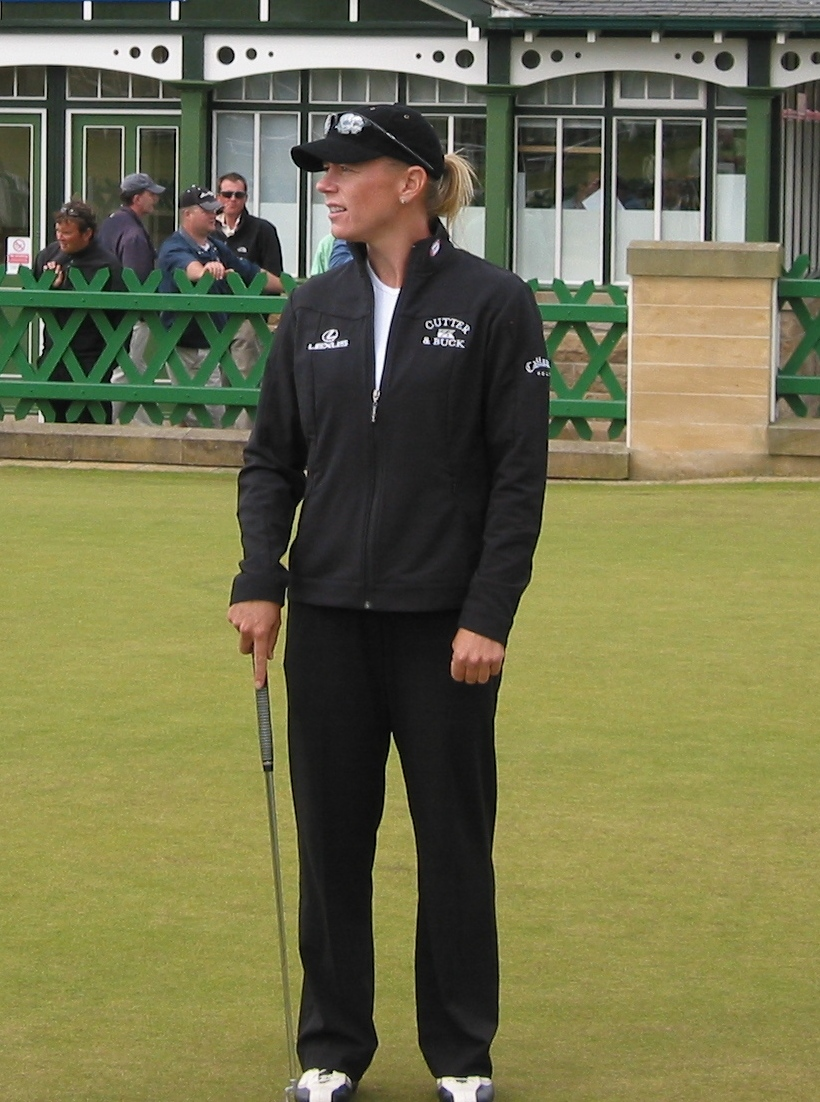
Annika Sörenstam has received the prize twice, in 1995 and 2003

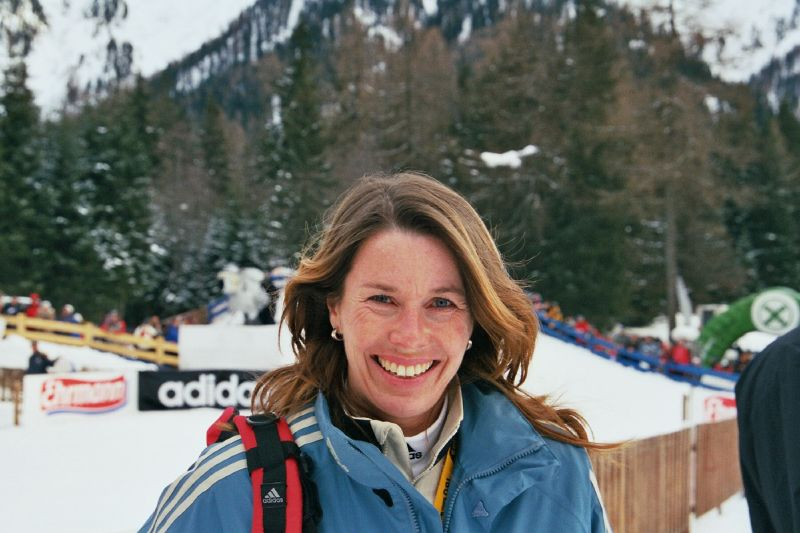
Magdalena Forsberg has received the most Jerring Awards with four, in 1997, 1998, 2000 and 2001

- 1979 - Ingemar Stenmark, alpine skiing
- 1980 - Ingemar Stenmark, alpine skiing
- 1981 - Annichen Kringstad, orienteering
- 1982 - IFK Göteborg, football men
- 1983 - Mats Wilander, tennis
- 1984 - Gunde Svan, cross-country skiing
- 1985 - Gunde Svan, cross-country skiing
- 1986 - Tomas Johansson, wrestling
- 1987 - Marie-Helene Westin, cross-country skiing
- 1988 - Tomas Gustafson, speed skating
- 1989 - Jan Boklöv, ski jumping
- 1990 - Sweden men's national handball team
- 1991 - Pernilla Wiberg, alpine skiing
- 1992 - Pernilla Wiberg, alpine skiing
- 1993 - Torgny Mogren, cross-country skiing
- 1994 - Sweden men's national football team
- 1995 - Annika Sörenstam, golf
- 1996 - Ludmila Engquist, athletics
- 1997 - Magdalena Forsberg, biathlon
- 1998 - Magdalena Forsberg, biathlon
- 1999 - Ludmila Engquist, athletics
- 2000 - Magdalena Forsberg, biathlon
- 2001 - Magdalena Forsberg, biathlon
- 2002 - Carolina Klüft, athletics
- 2003 - Annika Sörenstam, golf
- 2004 - Stefan Holm, athletics
- 2005 - Tony Rickardsson, speedway
- 2006 - Susanna Kallur, athletics
- 2007 - Zlatan Ibrahimović, football
- 2008 - Charlotte Kalla, cross-country skiing
- 2009 - Helena Jonsson, biathlon
- 2010 - Therese Alshammar, swimming
- 2011 - Rolf-Göran Bengtsson, horse show jumping
- 2012 - Lisa Nordén, triathlon
- 2013 - Henrik Stenson, golf
- 2014 - Sarah Sjöström, swimming
- 2015 - Sarah Sjöström, swimming
- 2016 - Peder Fredricson, horse show jumping
- 2017 - Peder Fredricson, horse show jumping
- 2018 - Hanna Öberg, biathlon
- 2019 - Tove Alexandersson, orienteering, ski mountaineering, ski orienteering and skyrunning
- 2020 - Armand Duplantis, athletics
- 2021 - Team Sweden, horse show jumping
- 2022 - Nils van der Poel, speed skating
- 2023 - Ebba Andersson, cross-country skiing
- 2024 - Truls Möregårdh, table tennis
- 2025 - Jonna Sundling, cross-country skiing

== Wins per sport ==
| Wins | Sport | Years won |
| 7 | Cross-country skiing | 1984, 1985, 1987, 1993, 2008, 2023, 2025 |
| 6 | Biathlon | 1997, 1998, 2000, 2001, 2009, 2018 |
| 6 | Athletics | 1996, 1999, 2002, 2004, 2006, 2020 |
| 4 | Alpine skiing | 1979, 1980, 1991, 1992 |
| 4 | Horse show jumping | 2011, 2016, 2017, 2021 |
| 3 | Football | 1982, 1994, 2007 |
| 3 | Golf | 1995, 2003, 2013 |
| 3 | Swimming | 2010, 2014, 2015 |
| 2 | Orienteering | 1981, 2019 |
| 2 | Speed skating | 1988, 2022 |
| 1 | Tennis | 1983 |
| 1 | Wrestling | 1986 |
| 1 | Ski jumping | 1989 |
| 1 | Handball | 1990 |
| 1 | Speedway | 2005 |
| 1 | Ski mountaineering | 2019 |
| 1 | Ski orienteering | 2019 |
| 1 | Skyrunning | 2019 |
| 1 | Table tennis | 2024 |

== See also ==
- Svenska Dagbladet Gold Medal
