= Sven Jerring =

Swedish radio man

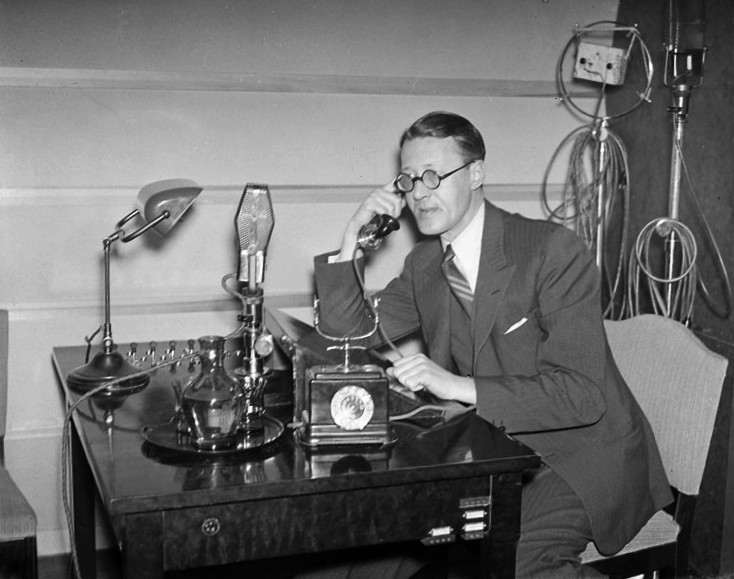
- Sven Jerring in 1937
- Born: Sven Alfred Teodor Jonsson; 8 December 1895; Malung, Sweden
- Died: 27 April 1979 (aged 83); Stockholm, Sweden
- Burial place: Norra begravningsplatsen
- Occupations: Radioman, sports commentator

Sven Alfred Teodor Jerring (born Jonsson, 8 December 1895 – 27 April 1979) was a Swedish radio man who for almost 50 years worked as a presenter, sports journalist, and commentator at the national Swedish broadcasting company AB Radiotjänst, in the mid-fifties renamed to Sveriges Radio.

He was married from 1929 to 1937 to book illustrator Yvonne Millde, and from 1972 until his death to nurse Barbro Wessel (1920–2007). He was the brother of actor and director Nils Jerring.

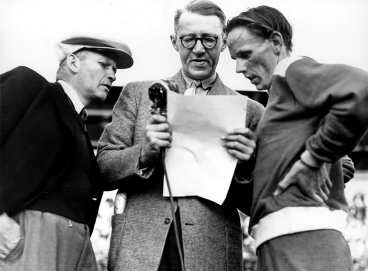
Sven Jerring (middle) and Gunder Hägg on 3 July 1942.

Jerring was born in Malung, Sweden, but the family moved a lot during his childhood. When he turned eleven the family moved to Vadstena, Sweden. The young Jerring has been described as a silent reclusive person that mostly liked to play. When he got older he graduated and did military service. He was stationed at Petrograd in current Saint Petersburg, Russia between 1917 and 1918. During his service the Russian October Revolution happened. After his return to Sweden from Petrograd, Jerring became a freelance journalist and wrote for the Vadstena Läns Tidning; in 1921 he moved to Östgöta-bladet where he wrote articles under the pseudonym Jerker Ring. In 1923 Jerring started working at Åhlén & Åkerlunds förlag; the same year he also started working for the publishing house's radio show and made his radio debut on 2 December 1923.

When Radiotjänst (now known as Sveriges Radio) started broadcasting on 1 January 1925, Jerring became its presenter and announcer. He became the most popular radio personality of the time, also known as Farbror Sven (lit. 'Uncle Sven') to the Swedish public. His skillful and knowledgeable reporting and sports reports became well-known and he commentated on Vasaloppet annually from 1925.

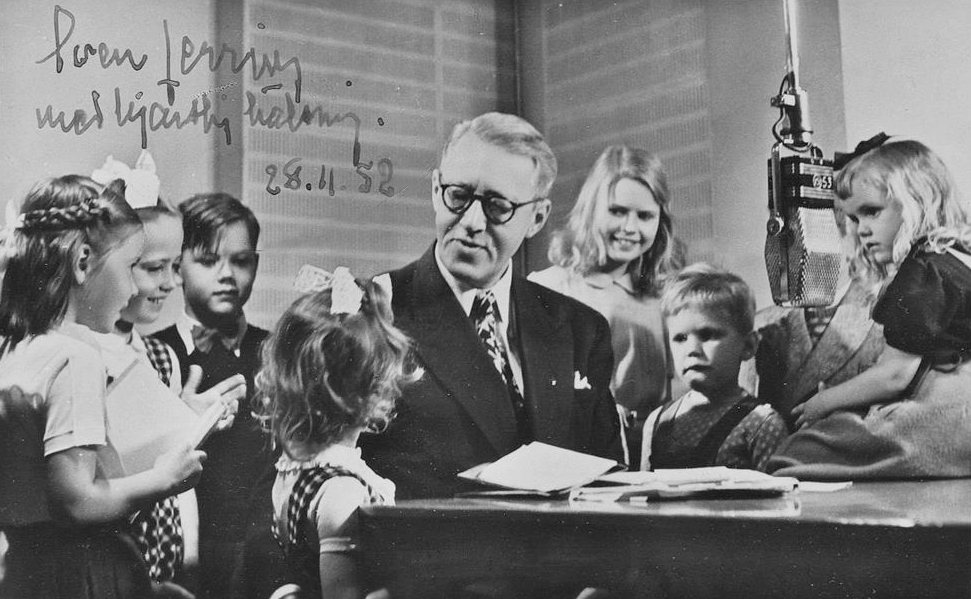
Barnens brevlåda broadcast in 1952.

The program Barnens brevlåda had its premiere broadcast on the radio in 1925, and is one of the longest running radio programmes in Swedish history. When Jerring ended the show on 11 June 1972, 1785 episodes had already been broadcast, making it the world's longest-broadcast radio programme at the time. In 1977 he was awarded the Illis quorum.

Jerring died in Stockholm in April 1979 and was buried at Norra begravningsplatsen.

== Jerringfonden and Jerringpriset ==
On Jerring's 60th birthday in 1955, a collection was taken up amongst friends and colleagues. With this money he created the Stiftelsen Sven Jerrings Fond för fysiskt och psykiskt missgynnade barn ('The Sven Jerring Foundation for physically and mentally disadvantaged children'), today known as Jerringfonden ('the Jerring Foundation'). Over the years so much money has been donated to the foundation that it can give away five million kronor annually in the form of scholarships and research grants.

Radiosportens Jerringpris is an annual award in Jerring's memory given to an athlete who has excelled in their sport, chosen by popular vote.
