= Bergshamra, Norrtälje =

Bergshamra
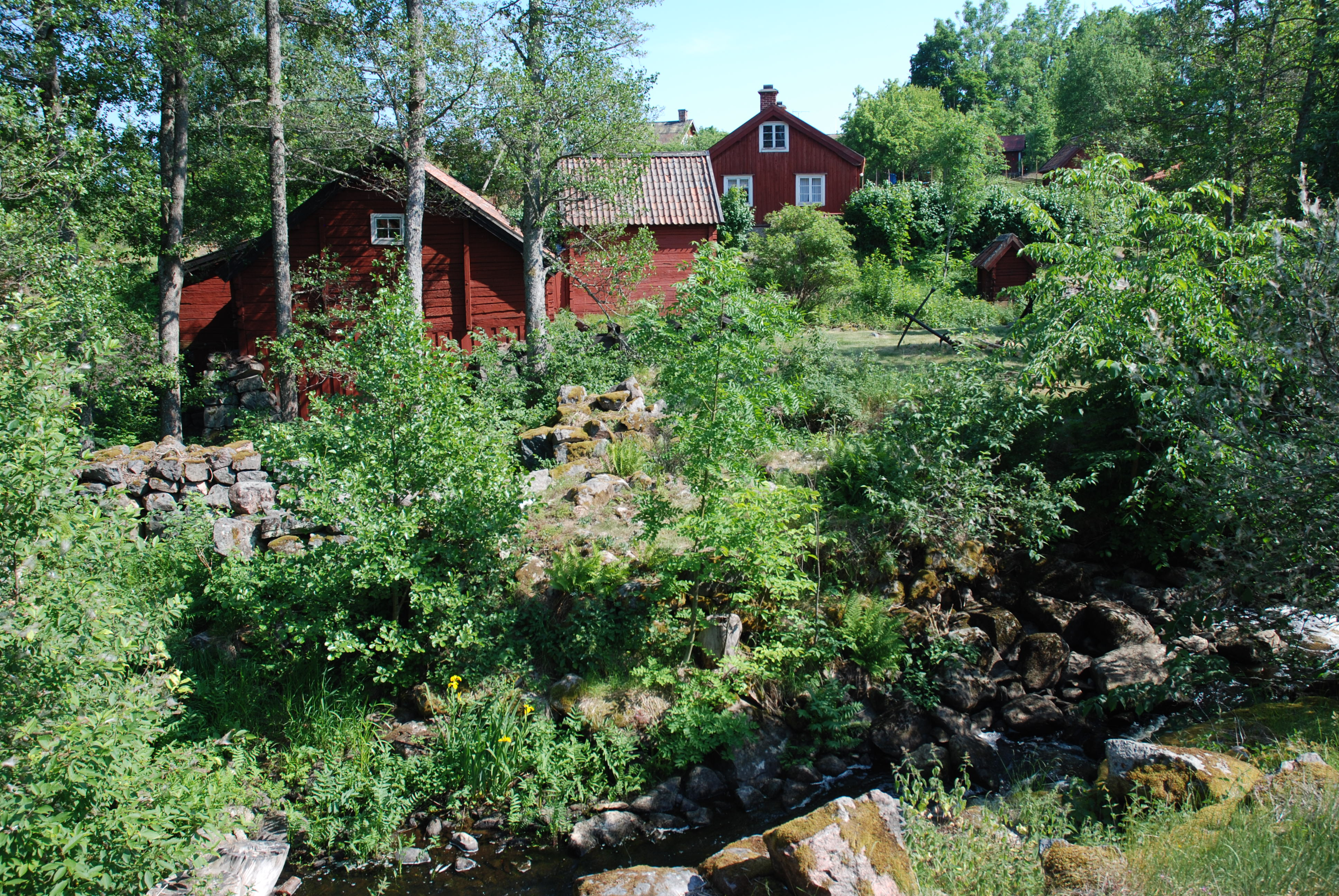
- Bergshamra mill

- Location within Stockholm Location within Sweden Location within European Union
- Coordinates: 59°38′05″N 18°37′41″E
- Country: Sweden
- Province: Uppland
- County: Stockholm County
- Municipality: Norrtälje Municipality

Area
  - Total: 1.60 km^{2} (0.62 sq mi)

Population (31 December 2020)
  - Total: 658
  - Density: 411/km^{2} (1,070/sq mi)
- Time zone: UTC+1 (CET)
  - Summer (DST): UTC+2 (CEST)

Bergshamra is a locality in Norrtälje Municipality, Stockholm County, Sweden. It situated some 15 kilometres (9.3 mi) south of the town of Norrtälje. It had 749 inhabitants in 2010.
