= Väddö Canal =

Canal in Stockholm County, Sweden

Coordinates: 59.9506°N 18.8291°E

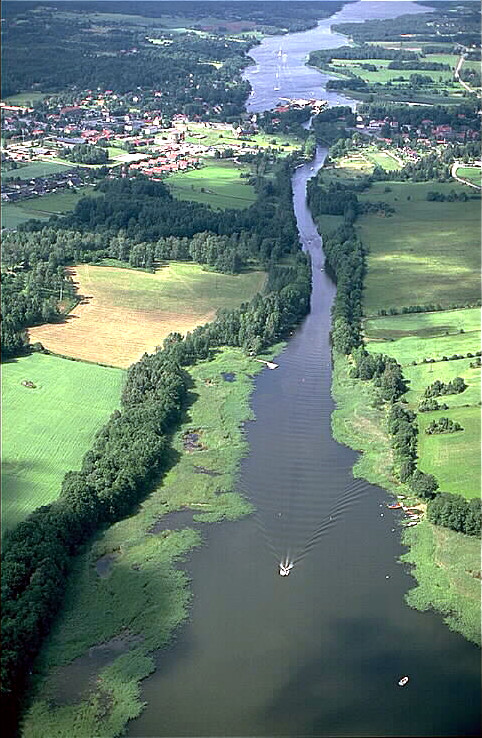
- An aerial view of the northern section of the Väddö canal, looking north, with Storfjärden at the bottom, the village of Älmsta in the middle, and the island of Väddö to the right
- Interactive map of Väddö Canal

Specifications
- Locks: 0
- Status: Fully operational
- Navigation authority: Sjöfartsverket

The Väddö Canal (Swedish: Väddö kanal) is an artificial canal first dug in the 16th century to provide a sheltered passage between the Bagghusfjärden to the south and the Väddöviken to the north. The canal separates the island of Väddö from the mainland, and passes through the village of Älmsta at its northern end, and the lake of Storfjärden towards its middle.

== Canal ==
The canal has an official depth of 2.0 metres and is mainly used by leisure boats, with some 20,000 boats passing through every year. There are no locks, but there are two opening bridges, the Älmstabron and the Bagghusbron.

The canal is routed along, or close to, what was originally a natural waterway, but this ceased to be navigable in the Middle Ages. A new channel was dredged several times, the first time to the order of King Gustav I in the 16th century. By the 18th century, the waterway had again ceased to be navigable, and the current canal was dug by the Swedish Army between 1820 and 1840, with traffic using it from 1835 onwards. At the beginning of the 20th century the channel was straightened, widened and deepened.
