= Barnens brevlåda =

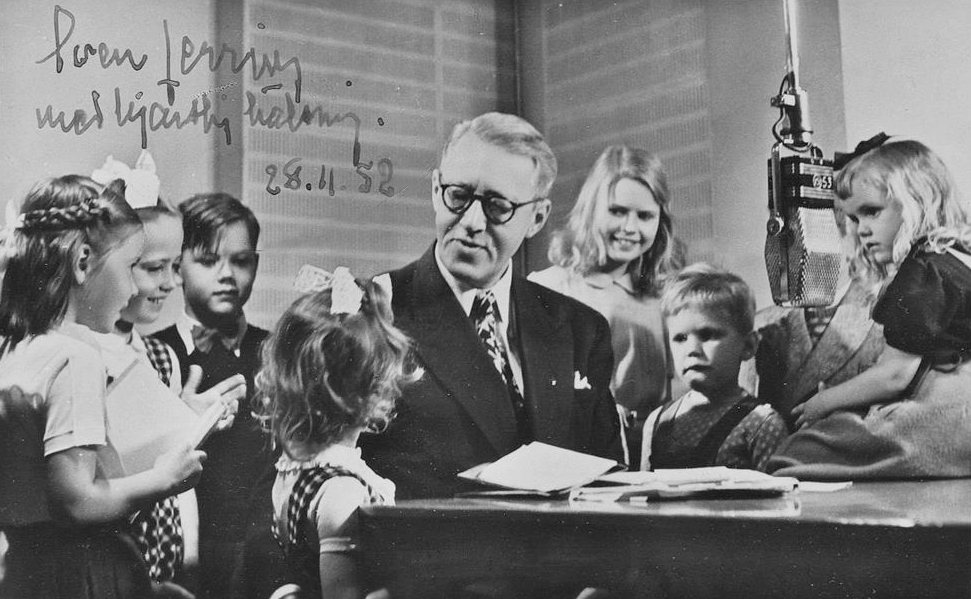
- Barnens brevlåda in 1952
- Genre: children
- Country of origin: Sweden
- Language(s): Swedish
- Home station: SR
- Starring: Sven Jerring
- Original release: 11 September 1925 – 11 June 1972
- No. of episodes: 1 785

Barnens brevlåda ("The Children's Letterbox") was a Swedish children's radio programme, led by Sven Jerring. It aired totally 1 785 times, between 11 September 1925 and 1972, making it the longest-lasting Swedish radio programme of that time. The record was broken on 14 November 1999 by the programme Smoke Rings.
