= Norrtälje Municipality =

Norrtälje Municipality Norrtälje kommun
- Municipality
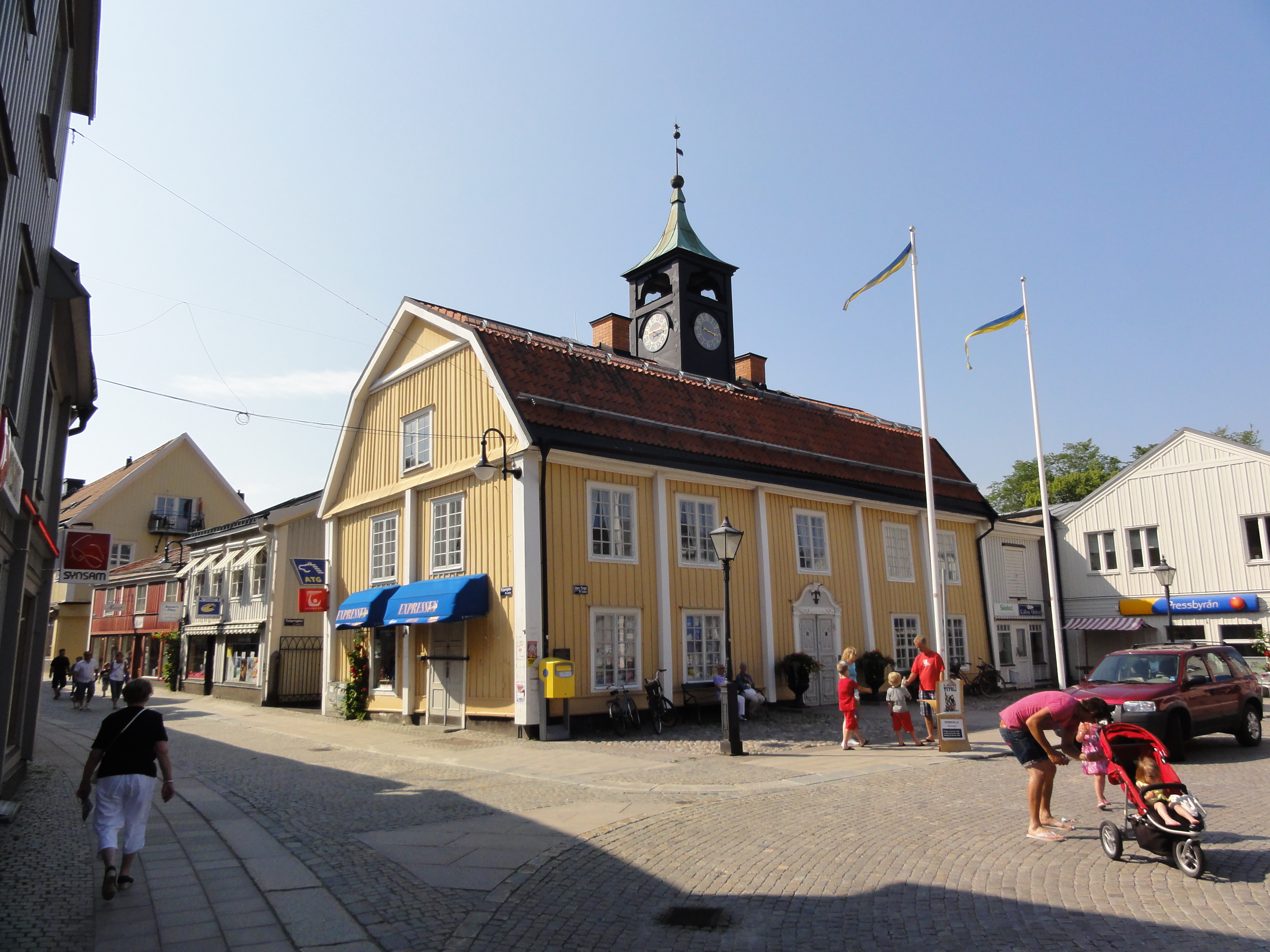
- Norrtälje town hall

- Coat of arms

- Coordinates: 59°46′N 18°42′E
- Country: Sweden
- County: Stockholm County
- Seat: Norrtälje

Area
  - Total: 5,869.67 km^{2} (2,266.29 sq mi)
  - Land: 2,016.04 km^{2} (778.40 sq mi)
  - Water: 3,853.63 km^{2} (1,487.89 sq mi)
- Area as of 1 January 2014.

Population (30 June 2025)
  - Total: 66,834
  - Density: 33.151/km^{2} (85.861/sq mi)
- Time zone: UTC+1 (CET)
  - Summer (DST): UTC+2 (CEST)
- ISO 3166 code: SE
- Province: Uppland
- Municipal code: 0188
- Website: www.norrtalje.se
- Density is calculated using land area only.

Norrtälje Municipality (Swedish: Norrtälje kommun) is a municipality in Stockholm County in east central Sweden. Its seat is located in the city of Norrtälje.

It is the largest and northernmost municipality of Stockholm County and was created in 1971 through the amalgamation of several former municipalities. There are 25 original local government units (as of 1863) combined in the present municipality. Since the municipality was formed in 1971, the population has grown almost every year. With the exception of the mandate period 2014–2018, Norrtälje has had a non-socialistic municipal government since 2010.

Many of the houses in Norrtälje municipality are summer cottages, only inhabited during summertime. This is due to its geographical location by the Stockholm archipelago, which makes it popular among Stockholmers and tourists. Norrtälje municipality has more than 13 000 islands.

== Localities ==
Population statistics
Locality	2016	2010	2006	2000	1990	1980
Norrtälje	19365	17275	16,504	16,234	14,472	13,034
Rimbo	4882	4629	4,878	4,544	4,228	3,598
Hallstavik	4536	4476	4,465	4,651	4,762	4,535
Älmsta	1376	1097	911	914	867	760
Hästängen	690	-	-	-	-	-
Edsbro	574	488	507	440	435	394
Bergshamra	572	749	712	611	549	470
Gräddö	556	-	-	-	-	-
Svanberga	524	501	474	447	429	390
Rånäs	428	428	572	593	497	389
Grisslehamn	418	249	262	275	300	316
Spillersboda	408	-	317	380	278	140
Herräng	377	422	430	457	412	449
Södersvik	352	281	241	195	200	205
Sättra	336	-	-	-	-	-
Riala	329	215	225	171	148	
Skebobruk	276	282	263	261	262	198
Söderby-Karl	268	231	185	179	198	217
Blidö	266	-	-	-	-	-
Nysättra	255	-	197	124	115	126
Finsta	239	244	176	139	132	89
Rö	-	-	269	309	270	223
Gräddö	-	-	259	245	180	144
Drottningdal	-	-	142	101	94	96
Furusund	-	-	125	114	103	102
Köpmanholm	-	-	102	105	103	91
Total	37,027	31,822	32,216	31,489	29,034	25,966

== Elections ==
=== Riksdag ===
This table lists the national results since the 1972 Swedish municipality reform. The results of the Sweden Democrats from 1988 to 1998 were not published by the SCB at a municipal level due to the party's small size nationally at the time.

Year	Turnout	Votes	V	S	MP	C	L	KD	M	SD	ND
1973	89.8	24,160	3.9	41.5	0.0	30.8	7.7	2.1	13.8	0.0	0.0
1976	90.9	25,568	3.5	40.3	0.0	31.0	8.8	1.3	14.9	0.0	0.0
1979	89.6	26,072	4.5	40.5	0.0	26.4	7.9	1.4	19.1	0.0	0.0
1982	90.5	27,177	4.6	42.3	1.6	22.5	4.6	1.5	22.9	0.0	0.0
1985	89.0	27,982	4.4	42.6	1.1	17.0	13.3	0.0	21.4	0.0	0.0
1988	85.0	27,530	5.1	41.6	5.2	16.6	11.1	1.9	18.3	0.0	0.0
1991	86.0	29,455	3.5	34.5	3.1	13.2	8.3	5.4	23.3	0.0	7.8
1994	85.8	30,841	5.6	43.2	5.5	11.3	5.7	3.1	23.6	0.0	1.4
1998	79.9	29,828	9.7	34.7	4.5	7.8	3.8	11.4	25.4	0.0	0.0
2002	78.6	31,287	6.2	39.3	4.5	8.6	13.1	8.2	17.3	0.5	0.0
2006	80.8	33,114	4.9	31.5	4.8	9.5	6.7	6.3	32.1	2.1	0.0
2010	83.2	36,152	4.5	26.5	7.2	8.0	6.6	4.9	36.1	5.1	0.0
2014	85.4	38,444	4.5	29.9	6.3	7.4	4.6	3.6	27.9	12.4	0.0

Blocs

This lists the relative strength of the socialist and centre-right blocs since 1973, but parties not elected to the Riksdag are inserted as "other", including the Sweden Democrats results from 1988 to 2006, but also the Christian Democrats pre-1991 and the Greens in 1982, 1985 and 1991. The sources are identical to the table above. The coalition or government mandate marked in bold formed the government after the election. New Democracy got elected in 1991 but are still listed as "other" due to the short lifespan of the party. "Elected" is the total number of percentage points from the municipality that went to parties who were elected to the Riksdag.

Year	Turnout	Votes	Left	Right	SD	Others	Elected
1973	89.8	24,160	**45.4**	52.3	0.0	2.3	97.7
1976	90.9	25,568	44.0	**54.7**	0.0	1.3	98.7
1979	89.6	26,072	45.0	**53.4**	0.0	1.6	98.4
1982	90.5	27,177	**46.9**	50.0	0.0	3.1	96.9
1985	89.0	27,982	**47.0**	51.7	0.0	1.3	98.7
1988	85.0	27,530	**51.9**	46.0	0.0	2.1	97.9
1991	86.0	29,455	38.0	**50.2**	0.0	11.8	96.0
1994	85.8	30,841	**54.3**	43.7	0.0	2.0	98.0
1998	79.9	29,828	**48.9**	48.4	0.0	2.7	97.3
2002	78.6	31,287	**50.0**	47.2	0.0	2.8	97.2
2006	80.8	33,114	41.2	**54.6**	0.0	4.0	96.0
2010	83.2	36,152	38.2	**55.6**	5.1	1.1	98.9
2014	85.4	38,444	**40.7**	43.5	12.4	3.4	96.6

== Transport ==
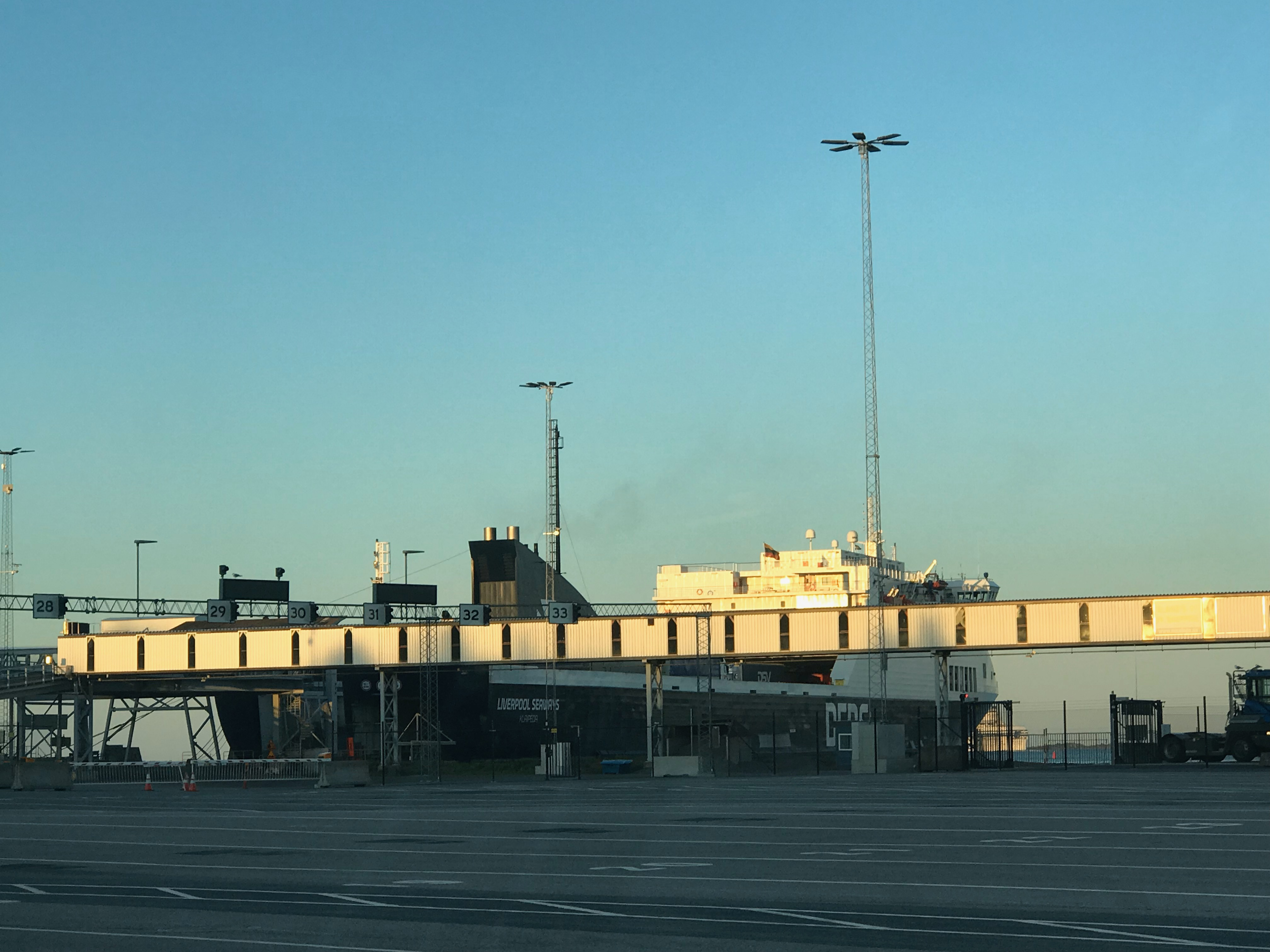
Kapellskär port

Norrtälje is located approximately 75 km northeast of central Stockholm. The European route E18 connects Norrtälje to other parts of Stockholm. Some of the major bus lines to Norrtälje include 620 and 621 from Åkersberga, 639 from Stockholm and Östhammar, 647 from the Stockholm-Arlanda Airport, 676 from Stockholm and 677 from Uppsala.

== Demography ==
=== Population development ===
Population development in Norrtälje Municipality 1970–2017
Year	Population
1970	38,238
1975	39,193
1980	40,842
1985	42,204
1990	46,165
1995	50,295
2000	52,611
2005	54,596
2010	56,080
2015	58,669
2017	60,808
2019	62,622
Source: SCB - Folkmängd efter region och år.

=== Residents with a foreign background ===
On 31 December 2017 the number of people with a foreign background (persons born outside of Sweden or with two parents born outside of Sweden) was 9 341, or 15.36% of the population (60 808 on 31 December 2017). On 31 December 2002 the number of residents with a foreign background was (per the same definition) 5 606, or 10.44% of the population (53 702 on 31 December 2002). On 31 December 2017 there were 60 808 residents in Norrtälje, of which 7 559 people (12.43%) were born in a country other than Sweden. Divided by country in the table below - the Nordic countries as well as the 12 most common countries of birth outside of Sweden for Swedish residents have been included, with other countries of birth bundled together by continent by Statistics Sweden.

Country of birth
31 December 2017
1	Sweden	53,249
2	Finland	1,877
3	European Union: Other countries	972
4	Asia: Other countries	572
5	Iraq	348
6	South America	344
7	Poland	341
8	Africa: Other countries	314
9	Europe outside of the EU: other countries	312
10	Syria	310
11	Thailand	278
12	Germany	276
13	Afghanistan	210
14	North America	203
15	Bosnia and Herzegovina	166
16	Norway	163
17	Eritrea	156
18	Iran	156
19	Yugoslavia/Yugoslavia; SFR Yugoslavia/Serbia and Montenegro	130
20	Turkey	128
21	Somalia	120
22	Denmark	101
23	Oceania	36
24	Iceland	21
25	Soviet Union	20
26	Unknown country of birth	5

=== 2022 population by district ===
This is a demographic table based on Norrtälje Municipality's electoral districts in the 2022 Swedish general election sourced from SVT's election platform, in turn taken from SCB official statistics.

There were 64,630 residents, including 51,006 Swedish citizens of voting age. 44.1% voted for the left coalition and 54.8% for the right coalition. Indicators are in percentage points except population totals and income. The districts within the urban area of Norrtälje only had about a third of the municipal population.

Location	Residents	Citizen adults	Left vote	Right vote	Employed	Swedish parents	Foreign heritage	Income SEK	Degree
Location			%	%					
Bergshamra	2,188	1,763	40.4	58.4	83	87	13	25,949	32
Blidö	1,161	1,020	43.4	55.3	80	93	7	24,177	32
Edebo-Ununge	1,675	1,302	46.2	52.2	76	81	19	22,412	27
Edsbro	1,224	970	39.5	60.0	81	84	16	24,049	30
Estuna	1,957	1,396	41.2	57.1	87	91	9	28,454	34
Fasterna	1,223	954	39.9	58.9	78	79	21	24,029	28
Frötuna N	1,966	1,497	39.4	60.2	86	89	11	28,163	37
Frötuna S	1,370	1,070	38.8	60.7	82	90	10	27,120	37
Gottröra-Närtuna	1,561	1,207	31.6	66.5	84	85	15	27,068	27
Hallsta C	1,207	935	51.3	47.7	69	73	27	19,496	17
Hallsta N	1,634	1,066	48.1	49.3	67	64	36	20,127	18
Herräng	1,048	896	48.5	50.6	69	84	16	21,301	23
Hysingsvik	1,028	870	40.2	58.6	82	91	9	27,386	36
Häverö	1,624	1,280	44.2	55.3	86	85	15	24,174	20
Lohärad-Malsta	1,138	855	36.2	62.5	87	94	6	28,448	29
Norrtälje Bryggården	1,961	1,721	50.0	48.8	83	82	18	24,792	36
Norrtälje Bältartorp	1,410	1,318	52.5	46.5	80	85	15	24,137	34
Norrtälje Flygfältet	1,716	1,228	50.8	47.6	78	72	28	24,209	31
Norrtälje Fågelsången	1,403	1,085	49.8	49.7	90	87	13	28,443	42
Norrtälje Färsna	823	588	49.4	48.7	86	83	17	24,882	35
Norrtälje Gransäter	1,230	964	43.8	55.3	83	80	20	25,582	34
Norrtälje Grind	2,122	1,754	47.8	51.5	86	82	18	24,422	32
Norrtälje Grossgärdet	1,618	1,230	51.4	47.6	72	69	31	20,567	45
Norrtälje Hamn	627	688	39.7	59.4	76	89	11	34,640	46
Norrtälje Kvisthamra	1,750	1,332	49.0	50.0	87	90	10	31,273	57
Norrtälje Solbacka	2,038	1,436	46.9	52.5	88	88	12	30,633	41
Norrtälje Stadskärnan	2,027	1,815	46.5	52.3	79	86	14	24,522	37
Norrtälje Vigelsjö	1,749	1,314	53.3	45.2	70	68	32	19,785	20
Norrtälje Ö Bryggård	1,121	989	50.6	48.9	81	84	16	25,205	36
Riala	1,602	1,187	36.7	62.4	84	83	17	26,588	27
Rimbo N	2,114	1,515	42.6	55.7	79	72	28	24,060	24
Rimbo ombygd	1,481	1,094	36.3	62.2	82	80	20	27,245	35
Rimbo S	1,676	1,256	44.2	54.8	78	75	25	22,162	28
Rimbo Ö	1,556	1,104	46.1	52.5	77	77	23	23,175	26
Roslags-Bro	1,665	1,291	41.5	57.3	86	90	10	25,969	32
Rådmansö	2,194	1,867	37.9	61.2	83	90	10	25,498	33
Rö-Skederid	2,345	1,787	40.6	58.1	85	88	12	27,208	32
Söderby Karl	1,156	882	44.4	55.0	80	86	14	24,406	33
Väddö N	1,185	1,059	43.2	56.1	81	88	12	22,978	29
Väddö S	1,008	845	43.7	55.2	82	91	9	23,264	30
Vätö	1,187	1,023	46.0	53.3	81	90	10	23,852	29
Älmsta	1,862	1,553	44.3	54.5	74	82	18	21,722	25
Source: SVT

== International relations ==
=== Twin towns — Sister cities ===
The municipality is twinned with:

- Sicaya Municipality, Bolivia
- Paldiski, Estonia
- Kärdla, Estonia
- Vihti, Finland
- Rūjiena, Latvia
- Pskov, Russia

== See also ==
- Roslagen
- Penningby castle
