= Norrtälje =

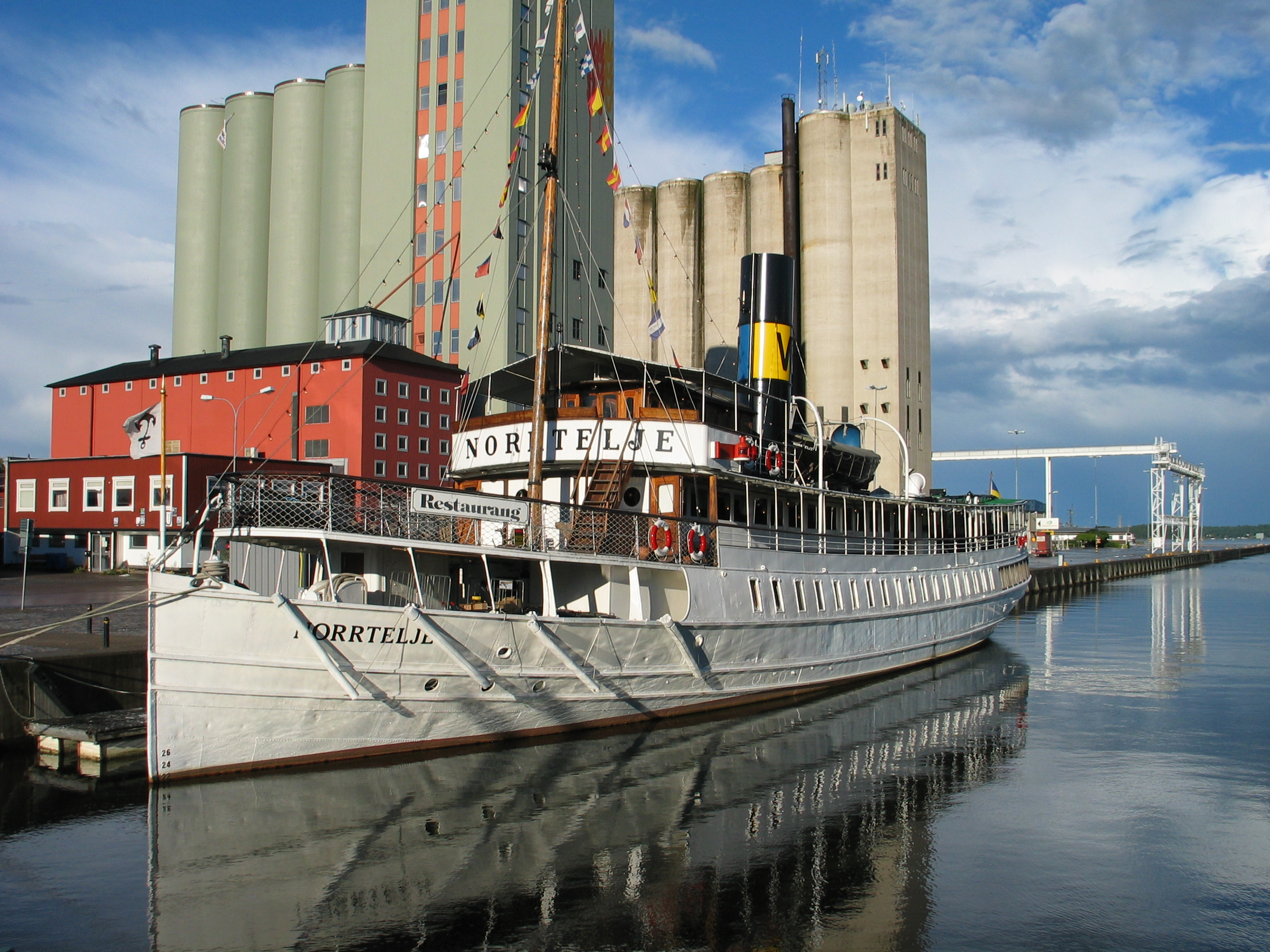
- SS Norrtelje in the Norrtälje harbour

- Location within Stockholm Location within Sweden Location within European Union
- Coordinates: 59°46′N 18°42′E
- Country: Sweden
- Province: Uppland
- County: Stockholm County
- Municipality: Norrtälje Municipality

Area
  - Total: 7.54 km^{2} (2.91 sq mi)

Population (31 December 2020)
  - Total: 22,018
  - Density: 2,920/km^{2} (7,560/sq mi)
- Time zone: UTC+1 (CET)
  - Summer (DST): UTC+2 (CEST)

Norrtälje is a locality and the seat of Norrtälje Municipality, Stockholm County, Sweden with 22,018 inhabitants in 2020. It is one of the largest towns in Roslagen.

== History ==
Norrtälje’s early history dates back to the Iron Age. Around 225 ancient monuments have been found within what is now the city. Three ancient castles are assumed to have stood in the former villages Nordrona, Solbacka and Knutby. Norrtälje traces its more recent history to 1219, when the location was first mentioned as Tälje. After some time, the name officially became Norrtälje, to distinguish it from the other Tälje in the province, Södertälje.

The town of Norra Tällie was founded by King Gustav II Adolf in 1622, as were several other towns after the outbreak of the Thirty Years' War, The city arms were created as an upside down anchor as early as 1622 when the charter was granted.

In 1719, large parts of the central town were burnt down by a Russian army during the Russian Pillage of 1719–21. The new stone church was not finished until 1726, and it was another four years before the city hall was completed.

Norrtälje had a railway station on the narrow gauge Roslagsbanan from 1884 to 1969. It is now served by SL buses as a part of the system of public transport in Stockholm.

Norrtälje has a first class industrial heritage displayed in the Pythagoras Mechanical Workshop Museum, based in the premises of a former hot bulb engine factory.

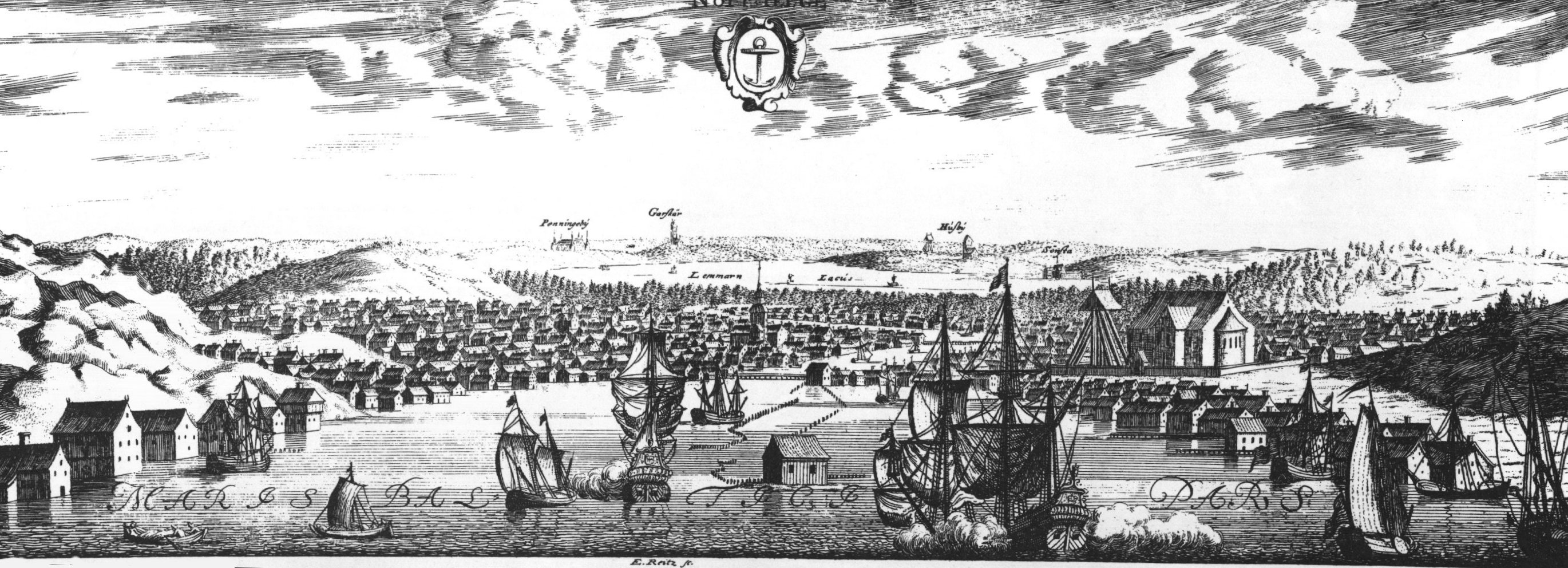
Norrtälje around 1700, in Suecia antiqua et hodierna.

== Climate ==
Norrtälje has a humid continental climate with some maritime influence. Summers are highly variable and can be either very warm or quite subdued. The official station number assigned to Norrtälje was 8644 and there was an downtown weather station in operation until 1984.

The chart below is from Svanberga, a village close to Norrtälje. Its more inland location makes it a bit more prone to cold snaps than the town itself, although high temperatures are similar. Even so, Norrtälje remains quite a bit colder than Stockholm and coastal areas further south throughout the year and is more likely to have snow cover. Another factor is the distance from the open ocean to the urban area, which has less maritime influence than other coastal towns.

Climate data for Svanberga, 8 kilometres (5.0 mi) north of Norrtälje (2002–2021 averages, extremes since 1995)
Month	Jan	Feb	Mar	Apr	May	Jun	Jul	Aug	Sep	Oct	Nov	Dec	Year
Record high °C (°F)	10.4 (50.7)	11.3 (52.3)	17.2 (63.0)	23.0 (73.4)	28.2 (82.8)	30.7 (87.3)	33.7 (92.7)	30.2 (86.4)	26.1 (79.0)	20.1 (68.2)	14.9 (58.8)	12.8 (55.0)	33.7 (92.7)
Mean maximum °C (°F)	6.2 (43.2)	7.3 (45.1)	12.9 (55.2)	18.5 (65.3)	23.3 (73.9)	27.1 (80.8)	28.5 (83.3)	26.9 (80.4)	22.3 (72.1)	16.1 (61.0)	10.7 (51.3)	7.4 (45.3)	29.4 (84.9)
Mean daily maximum °C (°F)	0.2 (32.4)	0.9 (33.6)	4.6 (40.3)	10.7 (51.3)	15.8 (60.4)	20.1 (68.2)	22.9 (73.2)	21.5 (70.7)	16.7 (62.1)	10.1 (50.2)	5.2 (41.4)	2.0 (35.6)	10.9 (51.6)
Daily mean °C (°F)	−3.0 (26.6)	−3.0 (26.6)	−0.2 (31.6)	4.8 (40.6)	9.7 (49.5)	14.0 (57.2)	16.9 (62.4)	15.9 (60.6)	11.8 (53.2)	6.4 (43.5)	2.5 (36.5)	−0.8 (30.6)	6.3 (43.2)
Mean daily minimum °C (°F)	−6.2 (20.8)	−6.8 (19.8)	−5.0 (23.0)	−1.2 (29.8)	3.5 (38.3)	7.9 (46.2)	10.9 (51.6)	10.3 (50.5)	6.8 (44.2)	2.7 (36.9)	−0.2 (31.6)	−3.6 (25.5)	1.6 (34.9)
Mean minimum °C (°F)	−20.4 (−4.7)	−19.0 (−2.2)	−16.3 (2.7)	−8.0 (17.6)	−3.4 (25.9)	1.3 (34.3)	4.5 (40.1)	3.2 (37.8)	−0.2 (31.6)	−5.8 (21.6)	−9.1 (15.6)	−14.3 (6.3)	−24.7 (−12.5)
Record low °C (°F)	−30.6 (−23.1)	−32.5 (−26.5)	−32.5 (−26.5)	−16.3 (2.7)	−8.4 (16.9)	−1.4 (29.5)	1.9 (35.4)	0.5 (32.9)	−3.2 (26.2)	−13.7 (7.3)	−25.6 (−14.1)	−31.6 (−24.9)	−32.5 (−26.5)
Average precipitation mm (inches)	44.2 (1.74)	31.3 (1.23)	27.7 (1.09)	27.4 (1.08)	45.0 (1.77)	58.3 (2.30)	57.6 (2.27)	68.9 (2.71)	47.3 (1.86)	54.5 (2.15)	55.1 (2.17)	51.6 (2.03)	568.9 (22.4)
Average precipitation days (≥ 1 mm)	10.8	8.0	6.6	6.0	8.1	8.4	8.2	9.2	8.6	9.9	10.9	11.6	106.3
Source 1: SMHI Open Data for Svanberga, precipitation
Source 2: SMHI Open Data for Svanberga, temperature

Climate data for Norrtälje
Month	Jan	Feb	Mar	Apr	May	Jun	Jul	Aug	Sep	Oct	Nov	Dec	Year
Mean daily maximum °C (°F)	−1 (30)	−1 (30)	5 (41)	9 (48)	15 (59)	19 (66)	21 (70)	20 (68)	15 (59)	10 (50)	4 (39)	1 (34)	9.7 (49.5)
Daily mean °C (°F)	−4 (25)	−4 (25)	0.5 (32.9)	4.5 (40.1)	10.5 (50.9)	14 (57)	16.5 (61.7)	15.5 (59.9)	11 (52)	7 (45)	2 (36)	−1.5 (29.3)	5.9 (42.6)
Mean daily minimum °C (°F)	−7 (19)	−7 (19)	−4 (25)	0 (32)	6 (43)	9 (48)	12 (54)	11 (52)	7 (45)	4 (39)	0 (32)	−4 (25)	2.2 (36.0)
Average precipitation mm (inches)	51.5 (2.03)	35.0 (1.38)	33.7 (1.33)	36.1 (1.42)	33.4 (1.31)	48.1 (1.89)	77.2 (3.04)	70.9 (2.79)	68.7 (2.70)	56.1 (2.21)	70.4 (2.77)	60.7 (2.39)	637.3 (25.09)
Source: SMHI.se

== Gallery ==
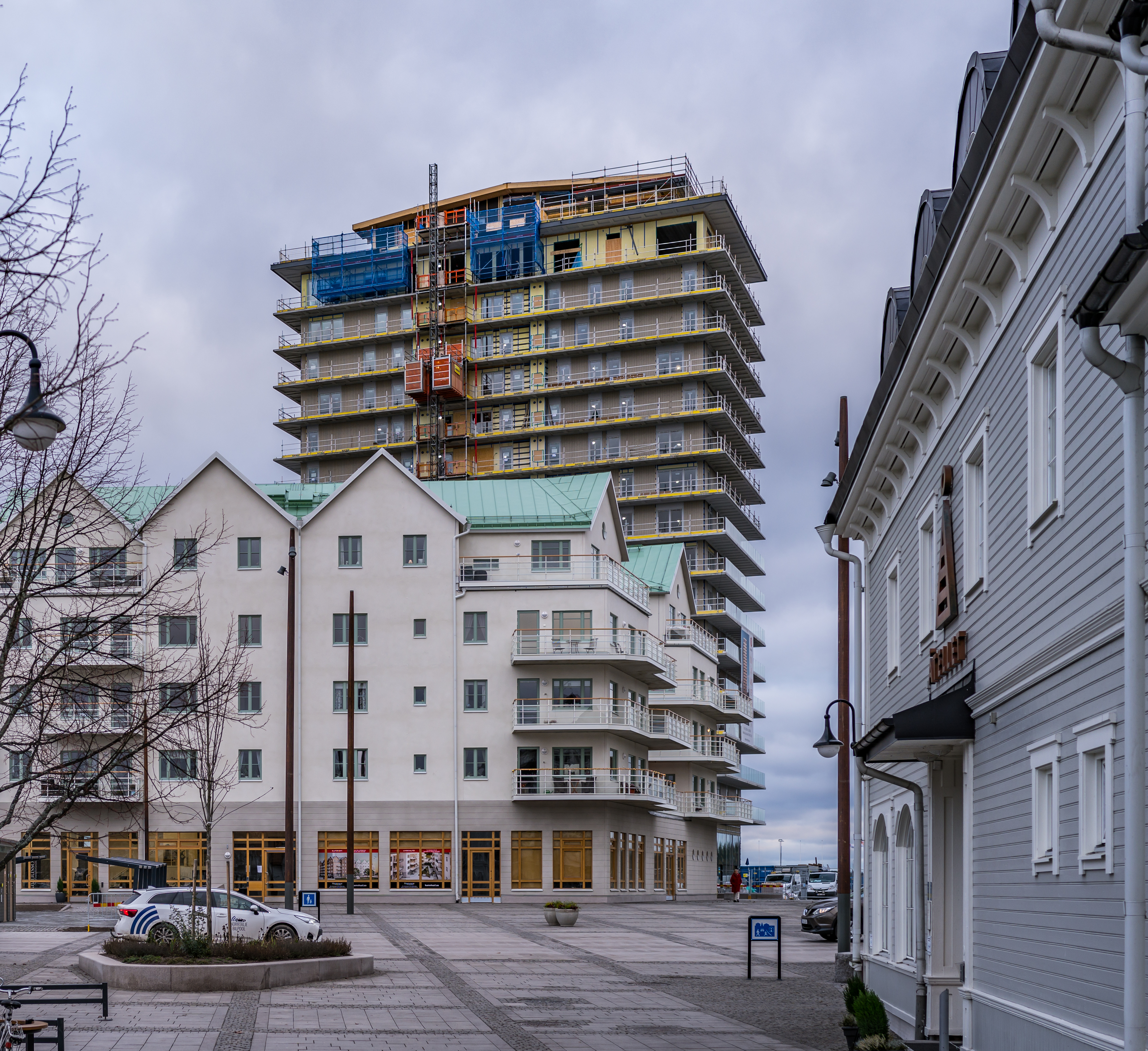
Norrtälje 2018

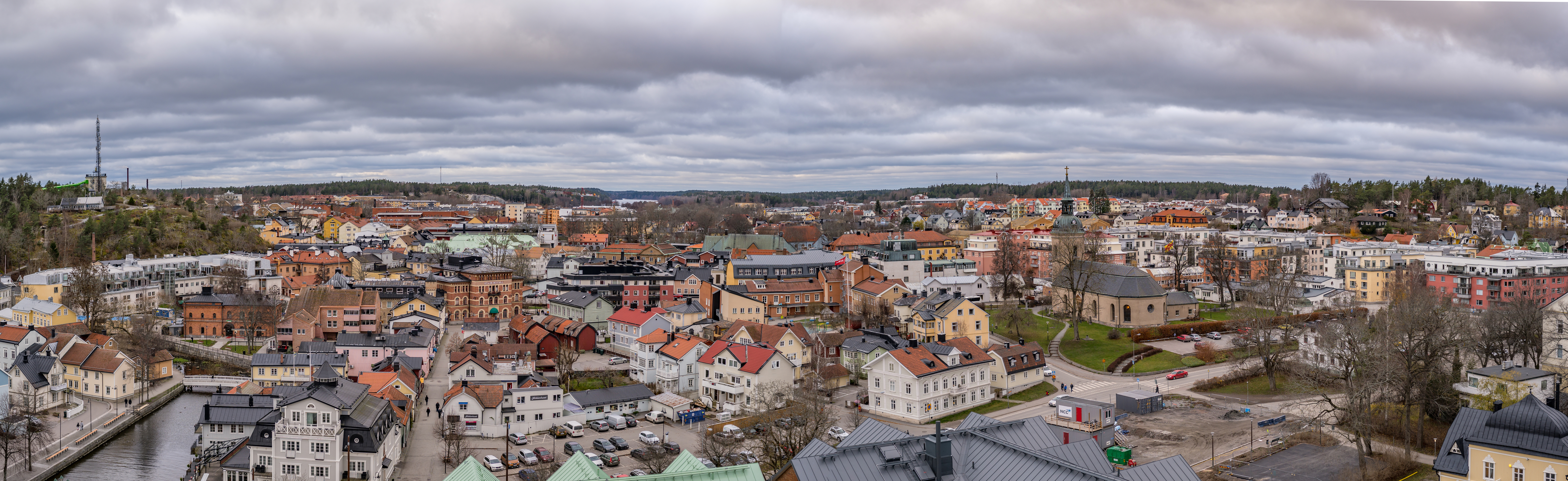
View west from Norrtälje Hamnplan

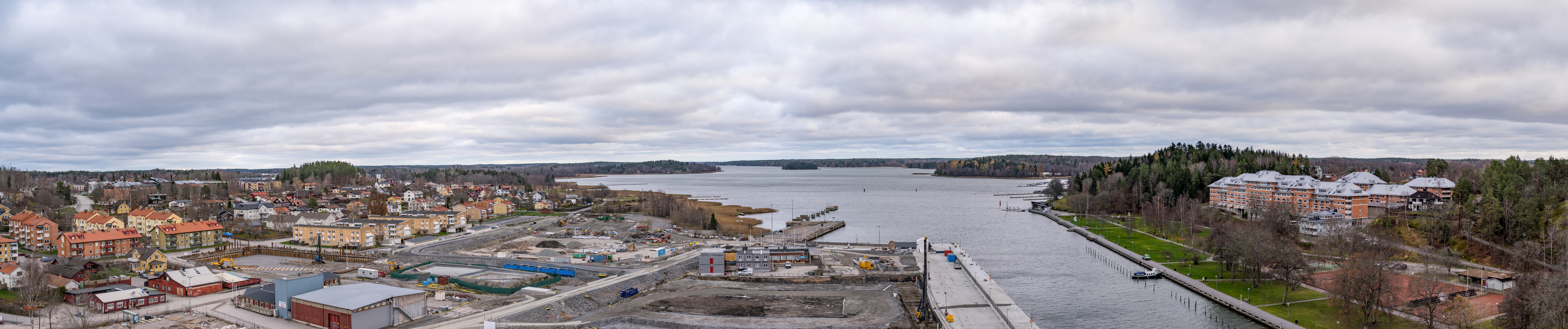
View east from Norrtälje Hamnplan

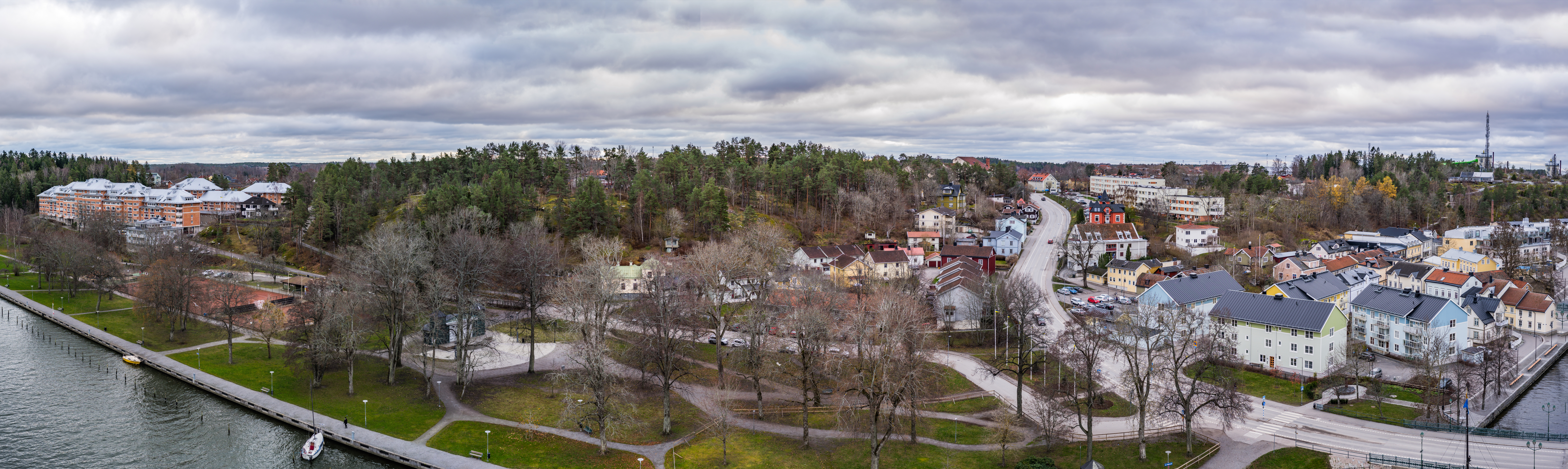
View south from Norrtälje Hamnplan

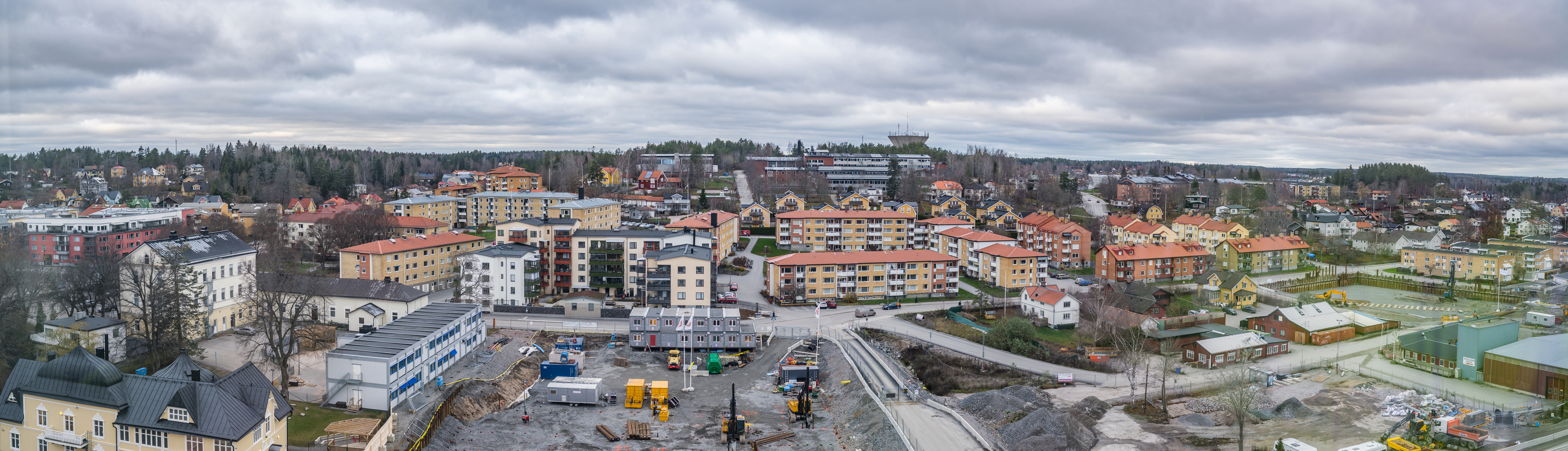
View north from Norrtälje Hamnplan

== Sports ==
The following sports clubs are located in Norrtälje include:

- BKV Norrtälje
- Norrtälje IK
- HK Ceres
- Roslagens GK
- Norrtelje BK

== Notable people ==
- Eddie Läck, former NHL goaltender who is now a coaching assistant for the Arizona State Sun Devils hockey team

== See also ==
- Penningby Castle
- Stockholm archipelago
- Roslagen
