= Brottby Concert =

- Concert by Max Resist, Vit aggression and others
- Venue: Yesterday dancing venue, Brottby, Sweden
- Date: 3 January 1998; 28 years ago

The Brottby Concert (Swedish: Brottbykonserten) was a Neo-Nazi rock concert held at the Yesterday dancing venue in Brottby, Sweden, the evening of January 3, 1998. Participating bands and audience members came from several countries. Riot police stormed the concert, arresting about 250 people, several suspected of hate speech. Foreign participants—for example, from the United States—stated during the trial they were unaware the nazi salute was considered hate speech in Sweden. The concert and subsequent trials was widely publicised by the domestic press.

Among the bands playing at the concert, major attention was given to, among others, Max Resist and Vit Aggression. The latter was performing just as the police rushed the premises. On their 2002 album Keep Fighting, Max Resist also recorded the song Battle of Brottby, referencing the event.
