= Karby, Sweden =

Karby
- Location within Stockholm Location within Sweden
- Coordinates: 59°34′N 18°13′E
- Country: Sweden
- Province: Uppland
- County: Stockholm County
- Municipality: Vallentuna Municipality

Area
  - Total: 0.46 km^{2} (0.18 sq mi)

Population (31 December 2020)
  - Total: 838
  - Density: 1,800/km^{2} (4,700/sq mi)
- Time zone: UTC+1 (CET)
  - Summer (DST): UTC+2 (CEST)

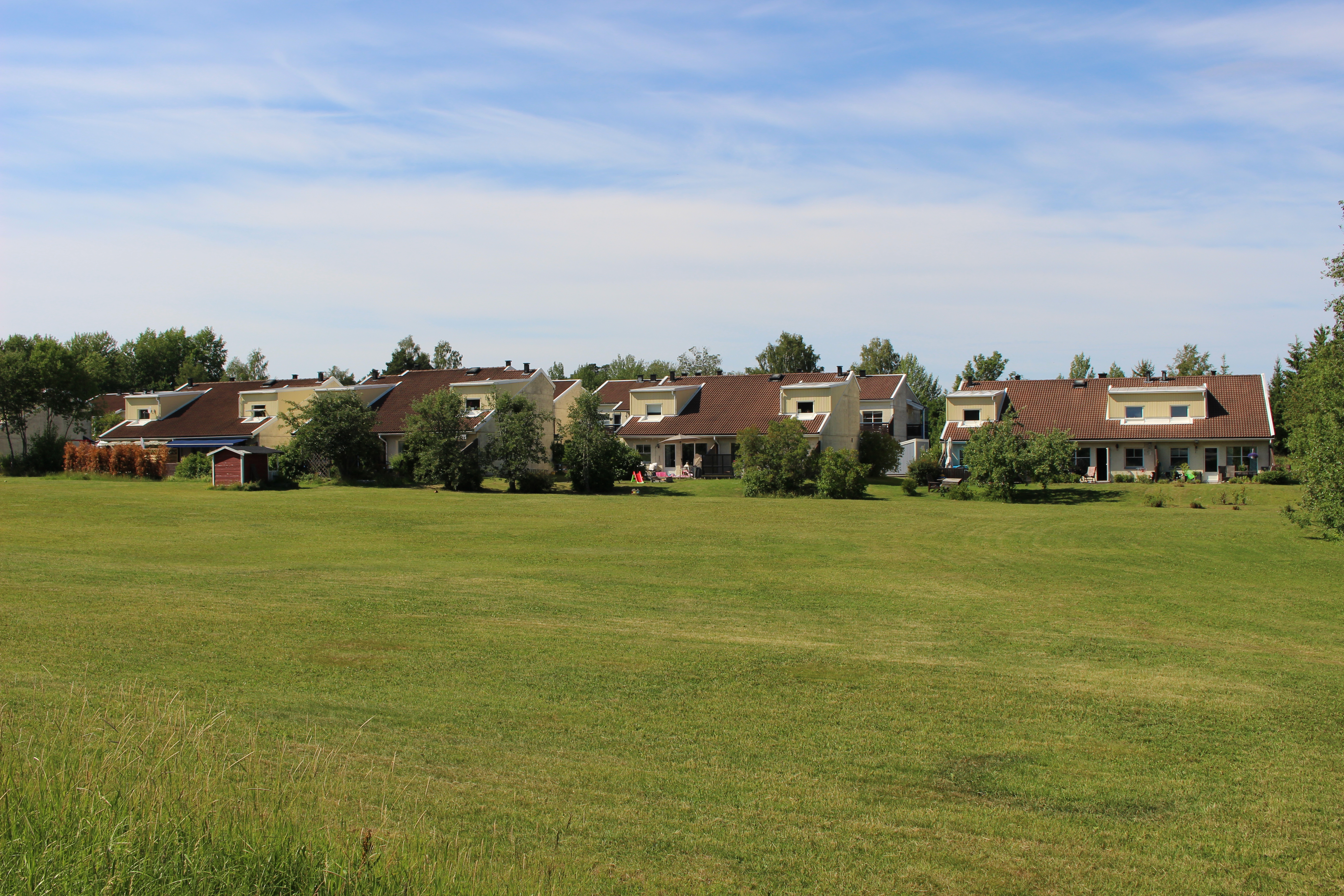
Buildings in Karby

Karby is a locality situated in Vallentuna Municipality, Stockholm County, Sweden.
