= Lindholmen, Vallentuna =

Lindholmen
- Location within Stockholm Location within Sweden Location within European Union
- Coordinates: 59°35′N 18°07′E
- Country: Sweden
- Province: Uppland
- County: Stockholm County
- Municipality: Vallentuna Municipality

Area
  - Total: 0.71 km^{2} (0.27 sq mi)

Population (31 December 2020)
  - Total: 1,186
  - Density: 1,700/km^{2} (4,300/sq mi)
- Time zone: UTC+1 (CET)
  - Summer (DST): UTC+2 (CEST)

Lindholmen is a locality situated in Vallentuna Municipality, Stockholm County, Sweden with 860 inhabitants in 2010.
