= Brottby =

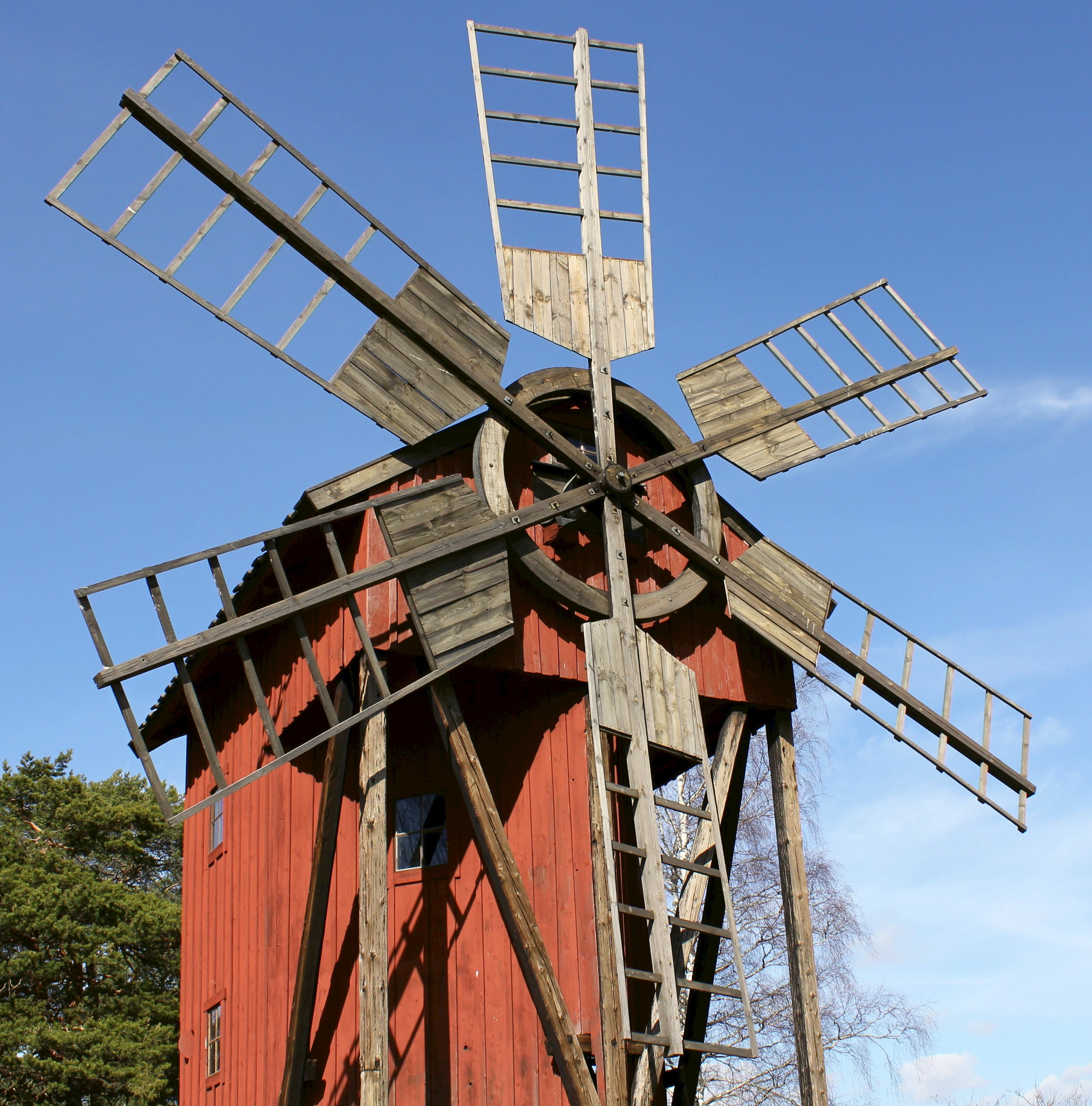
- Windmill in Brottby

- Location within Stockholm Location within Sweden
- Coordinates: 59°34′N 18°15′E
- Country: Sweden
- Province: Uppland
- County: Stockholm County
- Municipality: Vallentuna Municipality

Area
  - Total: 0.39 km^{2} (0.15 sq mi)

Population (31 December 2020)
  - Total: 248
  - Density: 640/km^{2} (1,600/sq mi)
- Time zone: UTC+1 (CET)
  - Summer (DST): UTC+2 (CEST)
- Locality code: T0116

Brottby is a locality situated in Vallentuna Municipality, Stockholm County, Sweden with 262 inhabitants in 2018. Brottby is located in the northern part of Össeby-Garn parish and borders Stora Karby in the west, Prästgården in the west and Svista in the south. In the north, Brottby borders Sundby and Libby in the old Garns parish. Brottby is surrounded by a beautiful cultural environment and important historical land such as Långhundraleden, ancient remains and a rich bird life.

== Buildings ==
Össeby-Garn Church is a local parish church, located near the northern tip of Garnsviken. Built in the 13th century (with a porch added in the 15th), Össeby-Garn Church is a Romanesque stone church typical of Uppland. Two runestones have been placed outside the church, and another has been built into the church floor.

Össeby Church, situated some 1 km (0.6 mi) southwest of Össeby-Garn Church, was possibly built at the end of the 14th century. As the parishes of Össeby and Garn were merged in 1838, the Garn parish church (now Össeby-Garn Church) assumed the roles of Össeby Church whose building, already in a bad state of repair, was abandoned. Össeby Church was finally ruined in a fire in 1856.

Brottby kvarn is an eight-sailed paltrok mill (skenkvarn), an unusual type of windmill where the windmill body is supported on a ring of rollers on which it rotates to bring the sails into the wind. The windmill was built in the 1870s and ground grain until the late 1910s. After decades of decay, the mill was restored between 1989 and 1993 with six sails. Between 2010 and 2015 the windmill machinery was restored, allowing the mill to operate again, and the mill was re-equipped with its original number of eight sails.

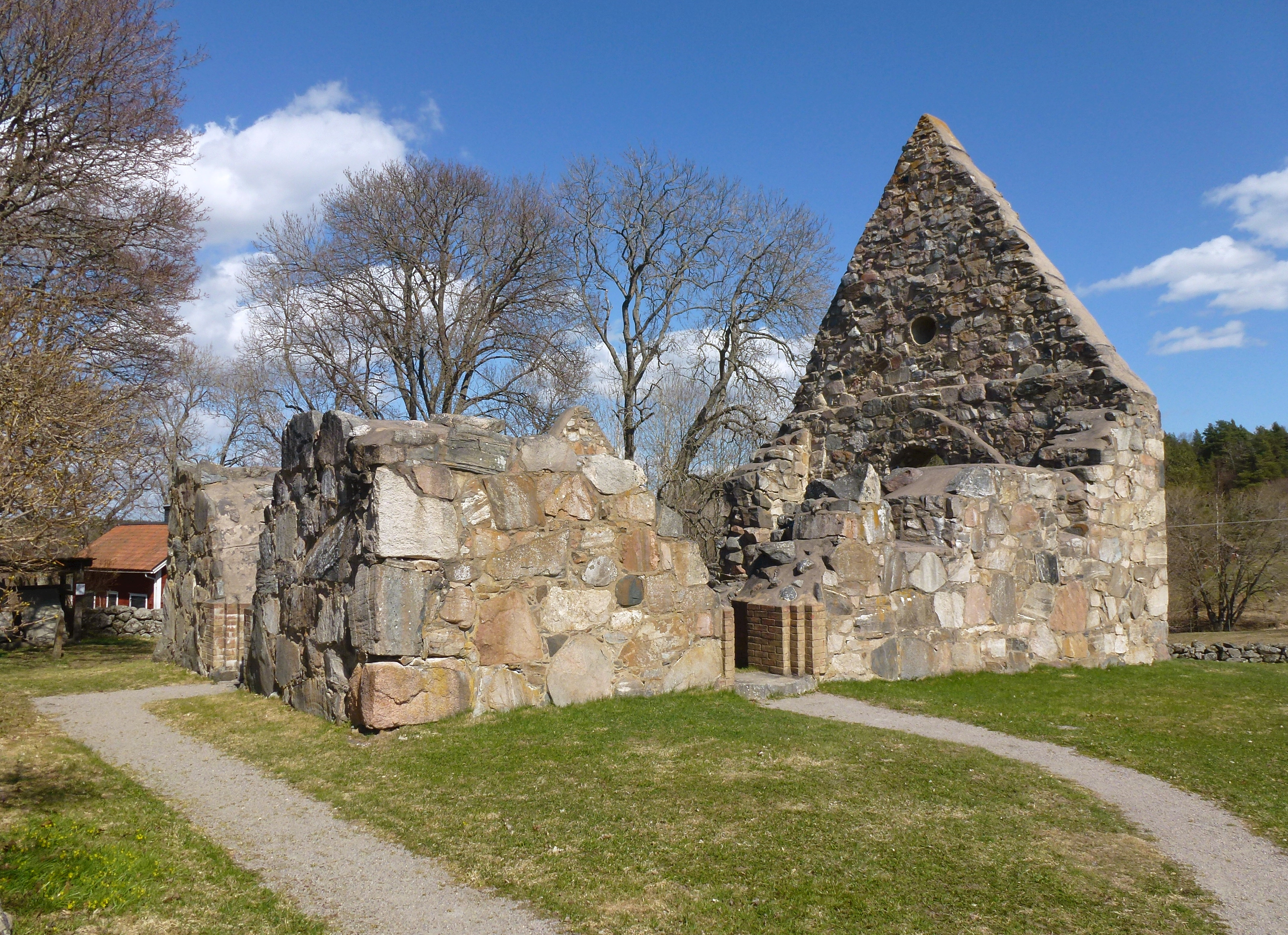
Ruins of Össeby Church

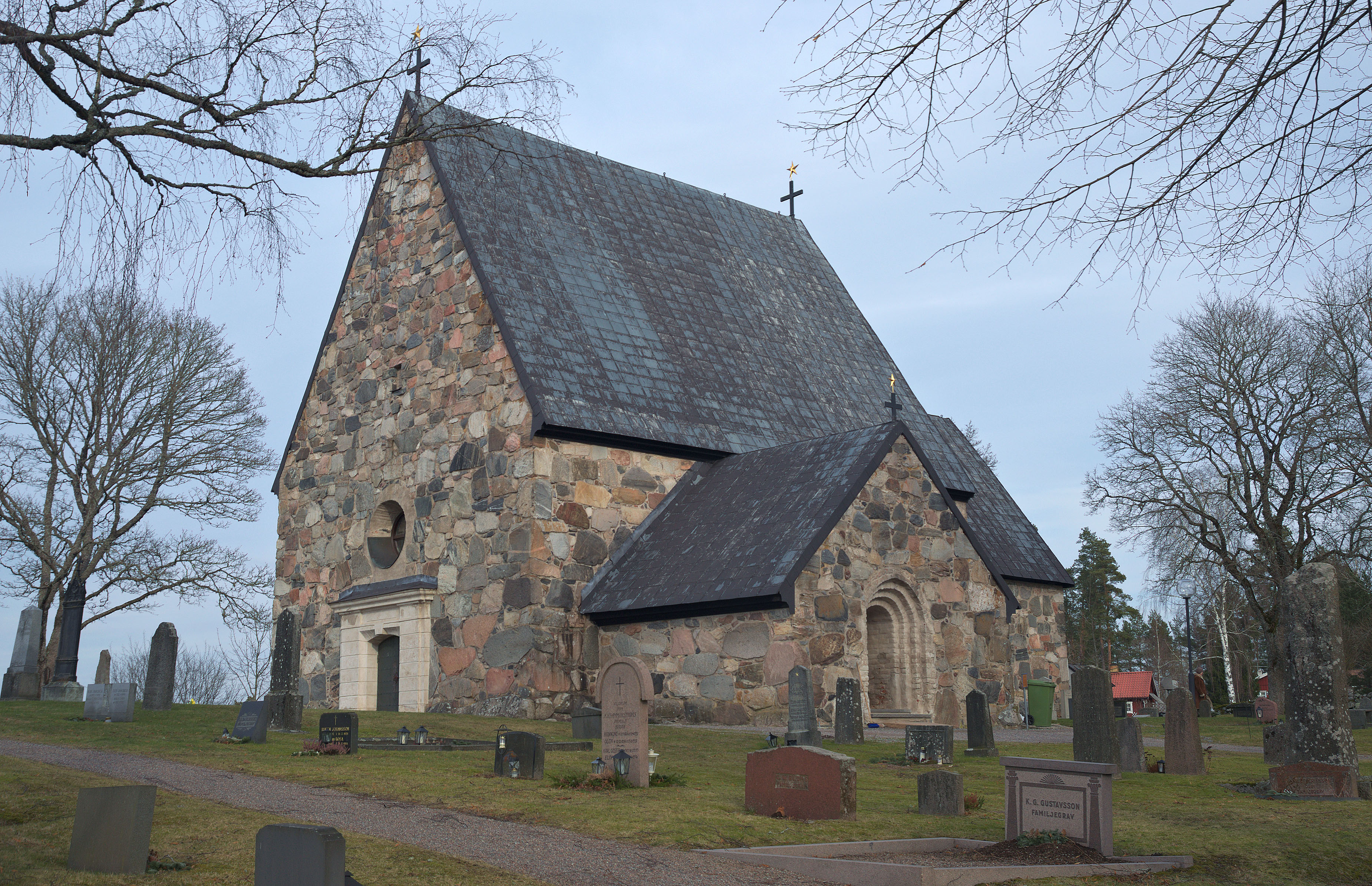
Össeby-Garn Church

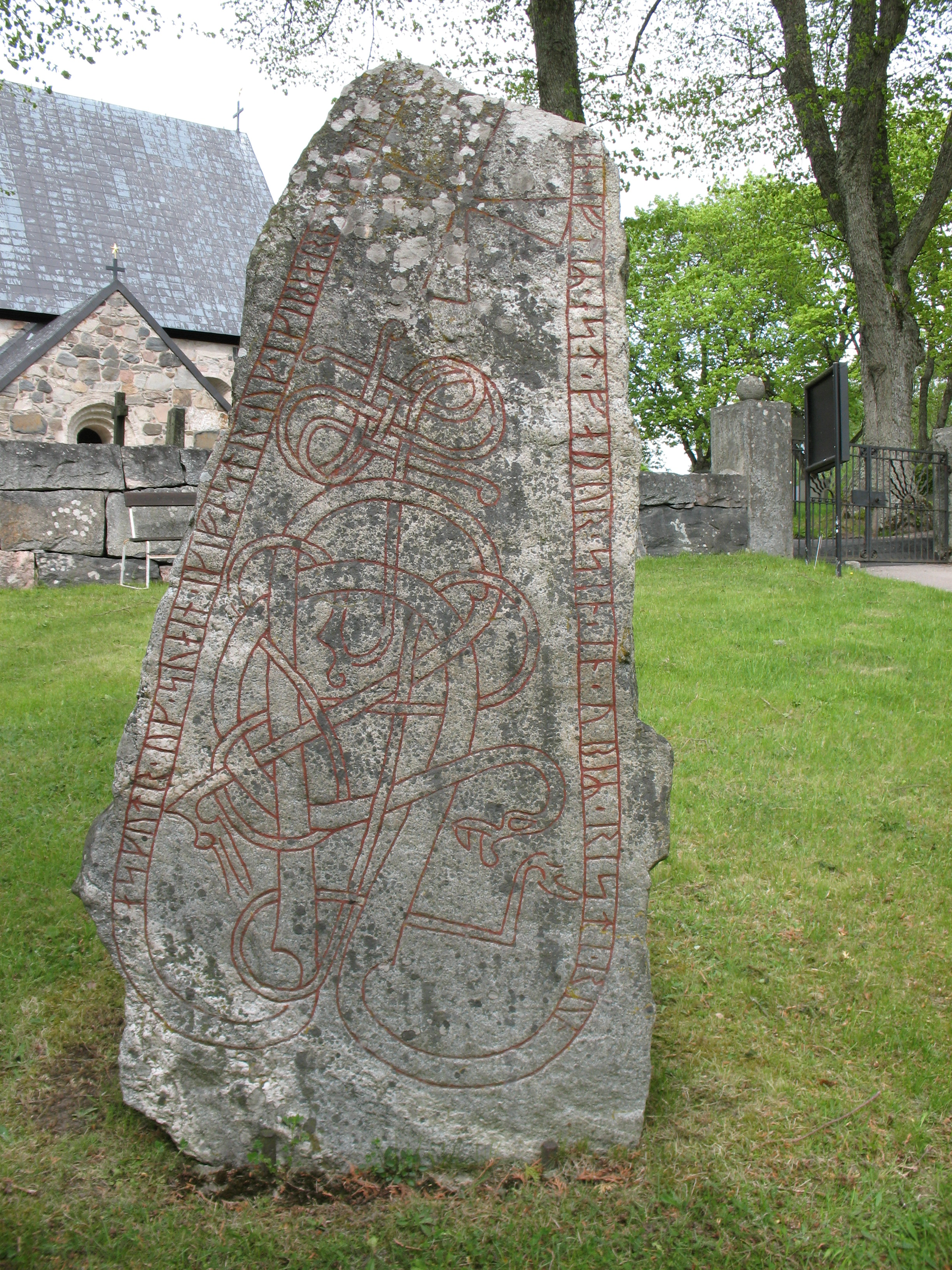
Runestone U 181

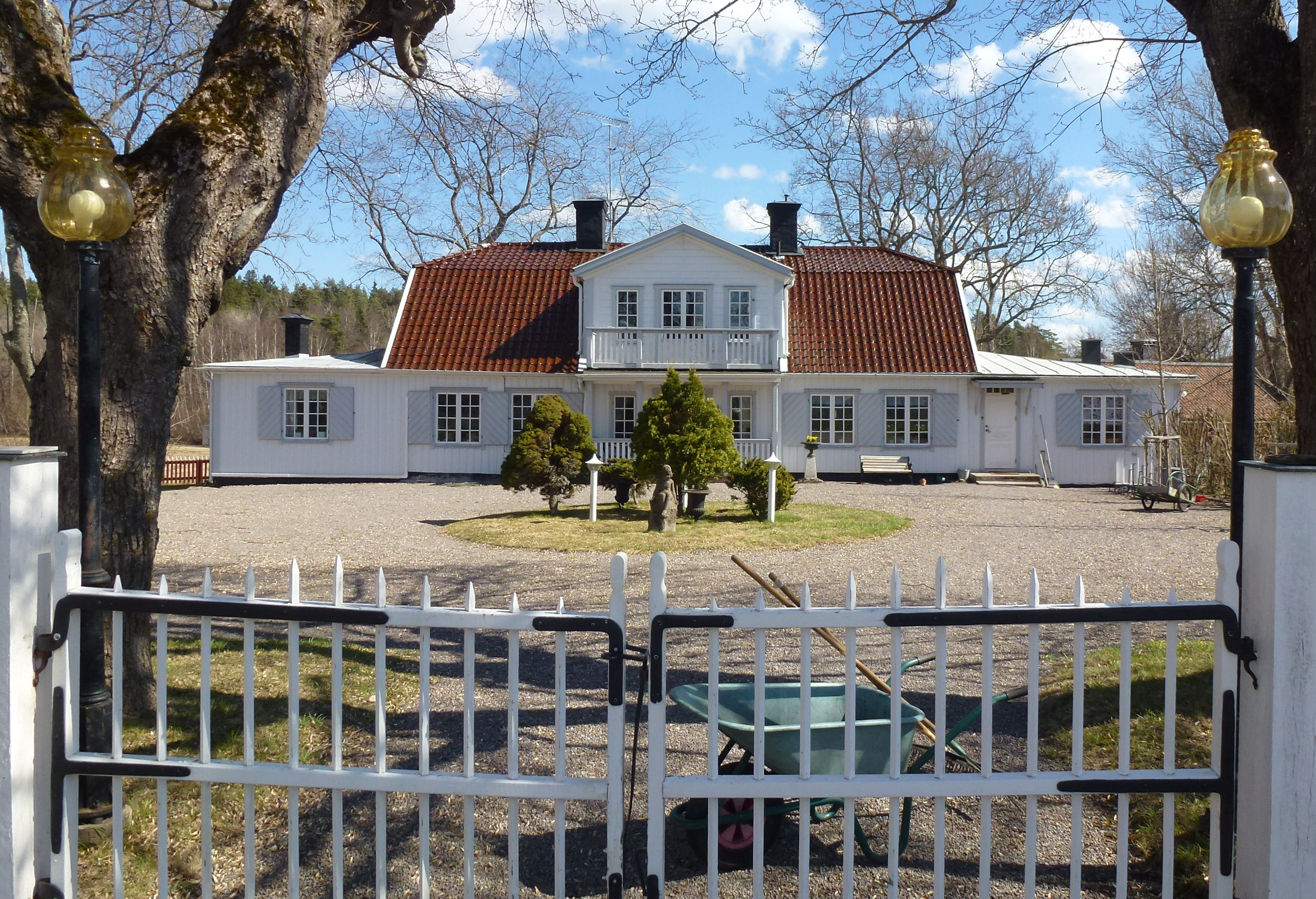
Brottby gård

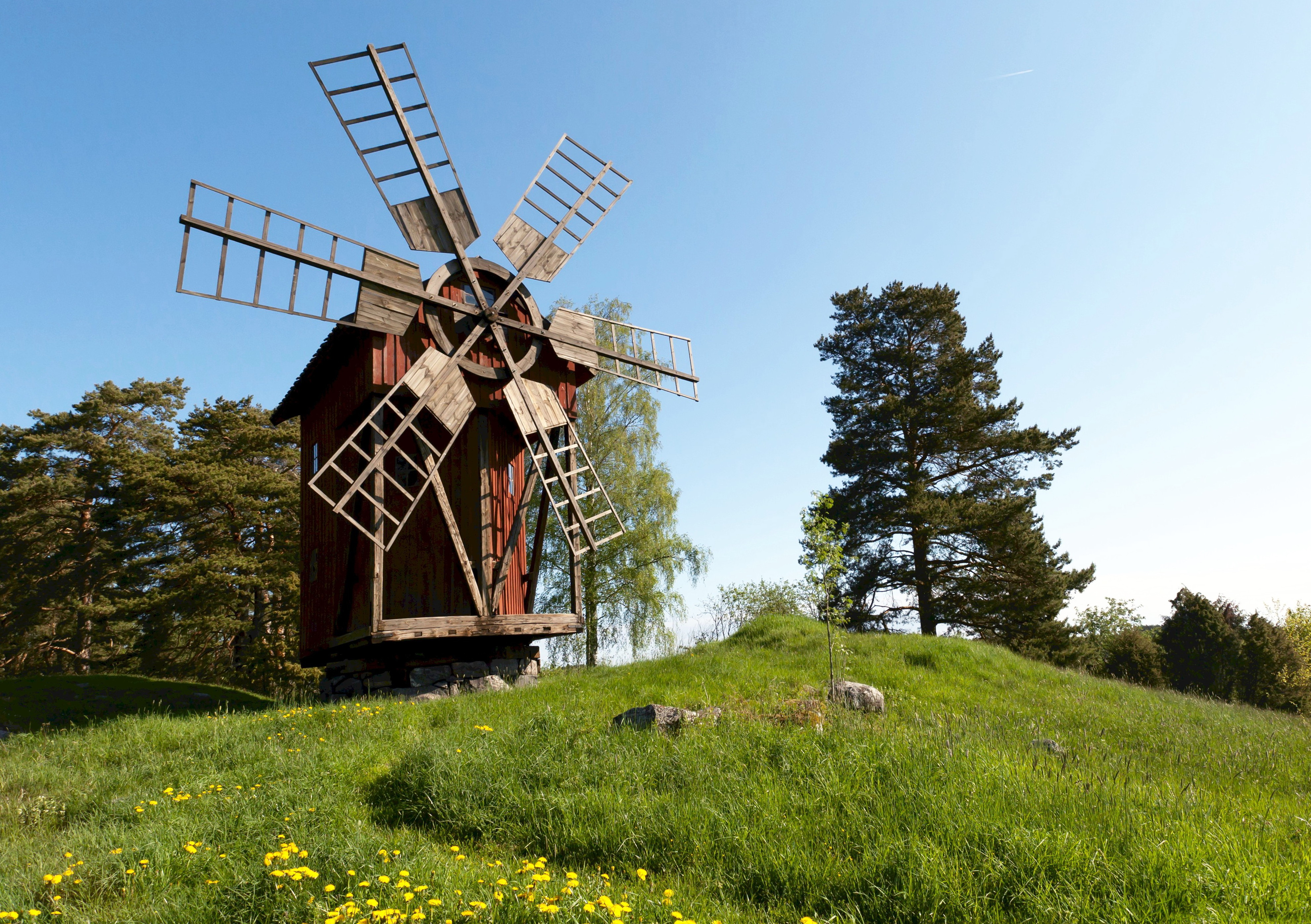
Brottby kvarn
