= Vallentuna Municipality =

Vallentuna Municipality Vallentuna kommun
- Municipality
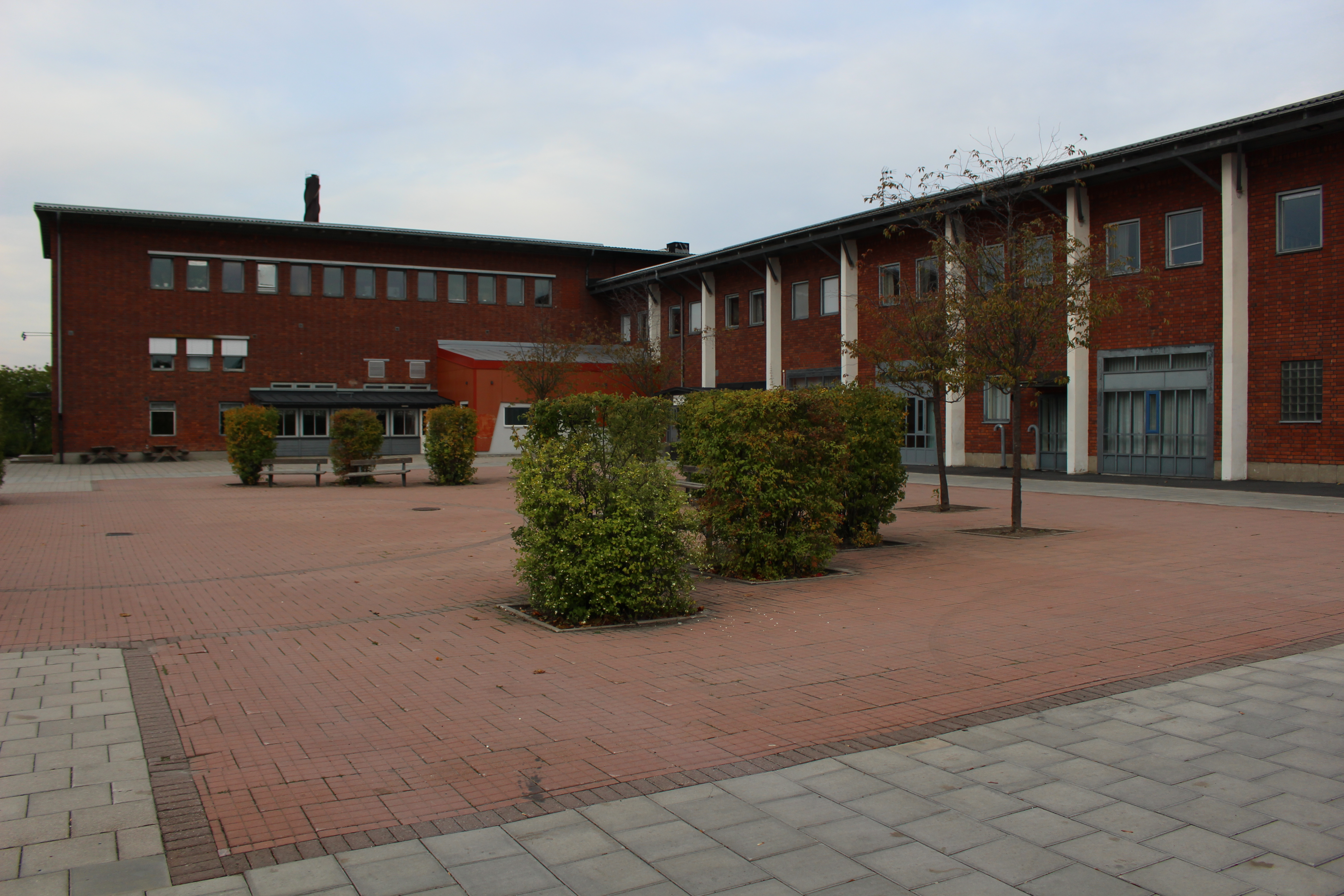
- Vallentuna Gymnasium

- Coat of arms

- Coordinates: 59°32′N 18°05′E
- Country: Sweden
- County: Stockholm County
- Seat: Vallentuna

Area
  - Total: 368.97 km^{2} (142.46 sq mi)
  - Land: 358.36 km^{2} (138.36 sq mi)
  - Water: 10.61 km^{2} (4.10 sq mi)
- Area as of 1 January 2014.

Population (30 June 2025)
  - Total: 35,272
  - Density: 98.426/km^{2} (254.92/sq mi)
- Demonyms: Vallentuner; Vallentunan; Vallentunian
- Time zone: UTC+1 (CET)
  - Summer (DST): UTC+2 (CEST)
- ISO 3166 code: SE
- Province: Uppland
- Municipal code: 0115
- Website: www.vallentuna.se
- Density is calculated using land area only.

Vallentuna Municipality (Swedish: Vallentuna kommun) is a municipality in Stockholm County in east central Sweden. Its seat is located in the town of Vallentuna.

The current municipality was established as a result of the municipal reform of 1971. Its coat of arms depicts an eagle, a broad axe and two stars.

== Geography ==
The geography is still dominated by nature and agriculture and some lakes and streams, besides the urban areas. Many houses are one family houses.

=== Localities ===
The seat of the municipality is in Vallentuna, which is a contiguous built-up area, partly situated in Täby Municipality. There are also smaller localities, such as Brottby, Karby, Kårsta and Lindholmen.

== Demography ==
=== Population development ===
Population development in Vallentuna Municipality 1970–2019
| Year | Population |
|---|---|
| 1970 | 12,711 |
| 1975 | 14,886 |
| 1980 | 17,603 |
| 1985 | 19,511 |
| 1990 | 22,186 |
| 1995 | 23,457 |
| 2000 | 25,228 |
| 2005 | 27,397 |
| 2010 | 30,114 |
| 2015 | 32,380 |
| 2017 | 33,175 |
| 2019 | 34,090 |
Source: SCB - Folkmängd efter region och år.

=== Income and Education ===
The population in Vallentuna Municipality has the 12th highest median income per capita in Sweden, although the share of highly educated persons, according to Statistics Sweden's definition: persons with post-secondary education that is three years or longer, is 28.6% and slightly over the national average, 27.0%.

=== 2022 by district ===
This is a demographic table based on Vallentuna Municipality's electoral districts in the 2022 Swedish general election sourced from SVT's election platform, in turn taken from SCB official statistics.

In total there were 34,213 residents, including 24,580 Swedish citizens of voting age. 40.9% voted for the left coalition and 57.9% for the right coalition. Indicators are in percentage points except population totals and income.

| Location | Residents | Citizen adults | Left vote | Right vote | Employed | Swedish parents | Foreign heritage | Income SEK | Degree |
| Location | | | % | % | | | | | |
|---|---|---|---|---|---|---|---|---|---|
| 1 Vallentuna V | 1,245 | 902 | 30.4 | 68.9 | 83 | 81 | 19 | 32,441 | 37 |
| 2 Markim-Ormesta | 1,844 | 1,294 | 43.9 | 55.0 | 87 | 85 | 15 | 32,152 | 51 |
| 3 Hammarbacken N | 2,135 | 1,476 | 41.0 | 57.7 | 89 | 82 | 18 | 33,572 | 49 |
| 4 Hammarbacken S | 1,990 | 1,437 | 42.7 | 56.0 | 81 | 73 | 27 | 27,841 | 39 |
| 5 Ormsta N | 2,120 | 1,458 | 42.8 | 56.1 | 88 | 80 | 20 | 33,099 | 53 |
| 6 Vallentuna NÖ | 2,694 | 1,771 | 36.7 | 62.1 | 87 | 81 | 19 | 33,443 | 49 |
| 7 Norrgården-Sörgården | 1,345 | 1,011 | 45.5 | 53.3 | 77 | 72 | 28 | 24,176 | 33 |
| 8 Vallentuna C | 1,919 | 1,568 | 51.2 | 47.6 | 75 | 76 | 24 | 22,678 | 37 |
| 9 Ormsta S | 2,061 | 1,530 | 49.9 | 48.0 | 80 | 57 | 43 | 24,098 | 39 |
| 10 Lovisedal | 2,315 | 1,699 | 41.1 | 58.0 | 85 | 85 | 15 | 33,255 | 58 |
| 11 Karlberg | 2,226 | 1,525 | 36.3 | 63.0 | 87 | 82 | 18 | 34,494 | 52 |
| 12 Vada-Angarn-Össeby | 2,054 | 1,502 | 37.1 | 61.7 | 85 | 81 | 19 | 29,841 | 43 |
| 13 Bällsta S | 1,956 | 1,283 | 36.9 | 61.7 | 88 | 85 | 15 | 42,848 | 70 |
| 14 Bällsta V | 2,408 | 1,748 | 40.7 | 58.4 | 88 | 81 | 19 | 32,788 | 55 |
| 15 Vallentuna SÖ | 2,239 | 1,563 | 40.8 | 58.6 | 89 | 85 | 15 | 37,501 | 59 |
| 16 Garn | 1,475 | 1,134 | 40.7 | 57.7 | 81 | 79 | 21 | 28,214 | 36 |
| 17 Kårsta-Frösunda | 2,187 | 1,679 | 38.1 | 60.2 | 84 | 85 | 15 | 28,895 | 36 |
Source: SVT

=== Residents with a foreign background ===
On 31 December 2017 the number of people with a foreign background (persons born outside of Sweden or with two parents born outside of Sweden) was 6 009, or 18.11% of the population (33 175 on 31 December 2017). On 31 December 2002 the number of residents with a foreign background was (per the same definition) 3 458, or 13.35% of the population (25 905 on 31 December 2002). On 31 December 2017 there were 33 175 residents in Vallentuna, of which 4 667 people (14.07%) were born in a country other than Sweden. Divided by country in the table below - the Nordic countries as well as the 12 most common countries of birth outside of Sweden for Swedish residents have been included, with other countries of birth bundled together by continent by Statistics Sweden.

Country of birth
31 December 2017
| 1 | Sweden | 28,508 |
| 2 | European Union: Other countries | 928 |
| 3 | Finland | 593 |
| 4 | Asia: Other countries | 503 |
| 5 | Poland | 400 |
| 6 | Iran | 277 |
| 7 | Iraq | 255 |
| 8 | South America | 233 |
| 9 | Germany | 188 |
| 10 | Europe outside of the EU: other countries | 182 |
| 11 | Africa: Other countries | 178 |
| 12 | Thailand | 175 |
| 13 | Syria | 157 |
| 14 | North America | 125 |
| 15 | Norway | 103 |
| 16 | Afghanistan | 80 |
| 17 | Yugoslavia/Yugoslavia; SFR Yugoslavia/Serbia and Montenegro | 61 |
| 18 | Denmark | 53 |
| 19 | Turkey | 37 |
| 20 | Bosnia and Herzegovina | 36 |
| 21 | Eritrea | 33 |
| 22 | Oceania | 25 |
| 23 | Iceland | 20 |
| 24 | Soviet Union | 20 |
| 25 | Unknown country of birth | 4 |
| 26 | Somalia | 1 |

== Present ==
Vallentuna has been expanding in recent years, and is one of the municipalities of the county that grows fastest every year, with more than 2% yearly, and has now doubled since 1971. Many people settle in Vallentuna because it is close to nature, and yet allows them to commute to their work places, both in Stockholm (to where the commuter gets you in 30 minutes) and elsewhere. In total, about 9,000 people commute from Vallentuna to other municipalities, while about 2,000 people commute into Vallentuna.

== Public transportation ==
The municipality is served by the Stockholm public transport system through SL. There are nine stops on the narrow gauge Roslagsbanan suburban railway as well as a bus network.

== Schools and education ==
All over the central part of Vallentuna you can find schools of different sorts, there is a cultureschool (Kulturskolan) that specialises in teaching music but also drama, musical and dance. Vallentunas "Högstadieskolor" (aimed for kids ages 12–16) are Hjälmstaskolan, Vittra Vallentuna, Hammarbackskolan, Bällstabergsskolan and Vallentuna Friskola. There also is a Secondary School ("gymnasieskola"), Vallentuna Gymnasium.

== Sports ==
Vallentuna has two sports facilities; Vallentuna IP and Össeby IP. Vallentuna IP is a modern sports facility with track & field, soccer fields, ice hockey rinks, tennis courts and trail runs. Össeby IP has a track & field track, soccer field, trail runs, inside tennis courts, and an inside sports gym.
