= Coat of arms of Uppland =

Coat of arms of Uppland

The coat of arms of Uppland in Sweden is Gules, an orb or (that is to say, a golden orb, or globus cruciger, on a red background). The coat of arms is surmounted by a duke's coronet, as are the other Swedish regional coats of arms.

The arms were created for the funeral procession of Gustav Vasa in 1560 in Uppsala Cathedral in this province, and have remained unchanged since. The orb symbolises spiritual and earthly power. (The coat of arms of Uppsala County is identical, but with a royal crown in place of the duke's coronet.) These arms also form the flag of Uppland, and are included in the coat of arms of Stockholm County, along with small versions of the coats of arms of Södermanland and Stockholm.

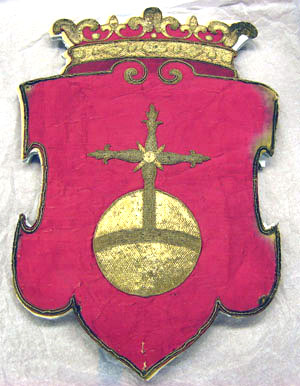
Arms of Uppland 1633–1634, in the Livrustkammaren (Royal Armoury)

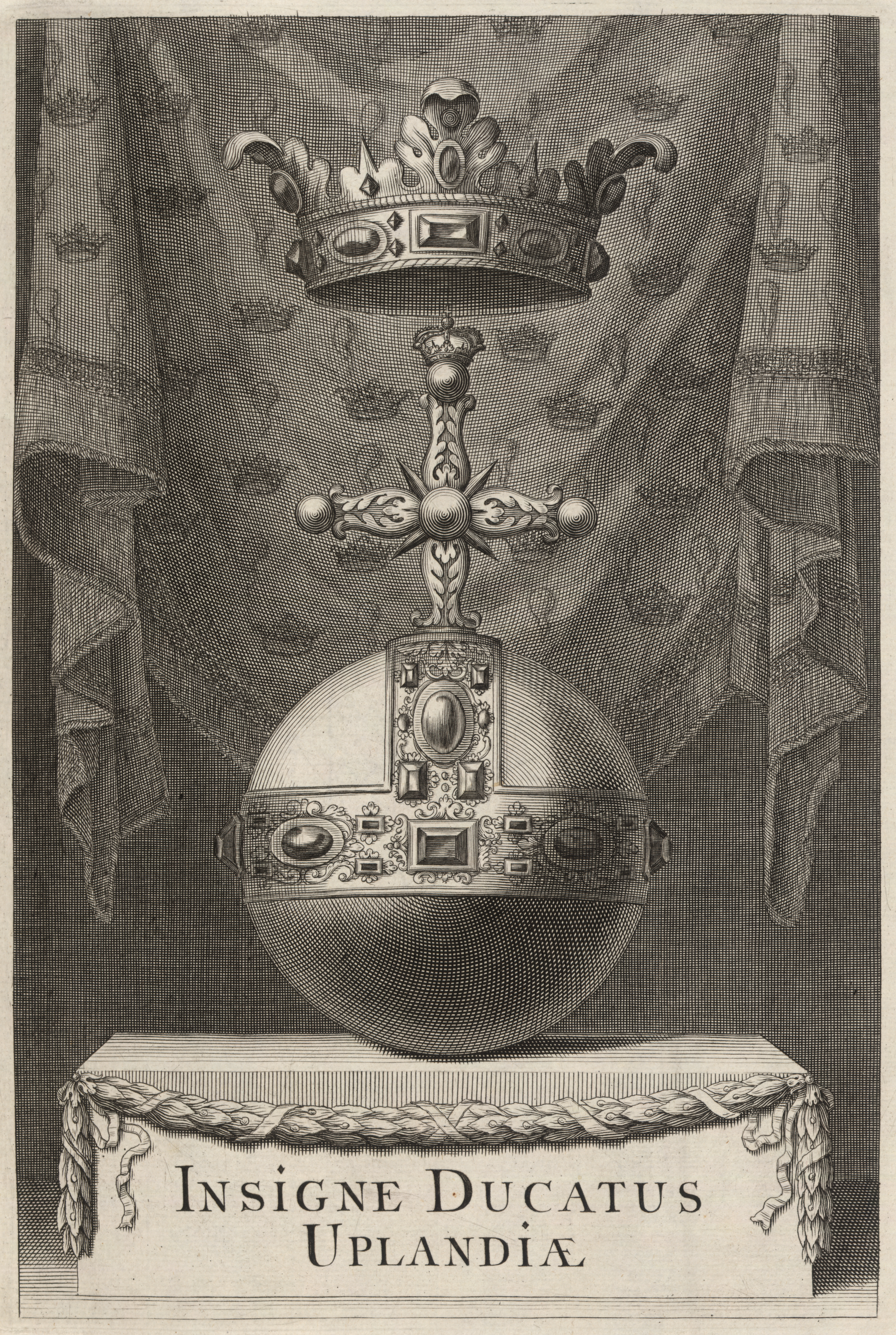
The arms in Suecia antiqua et hodierna, 1668

Flag of Uppland
