= Globus cruciger =

Christian symbol of authority

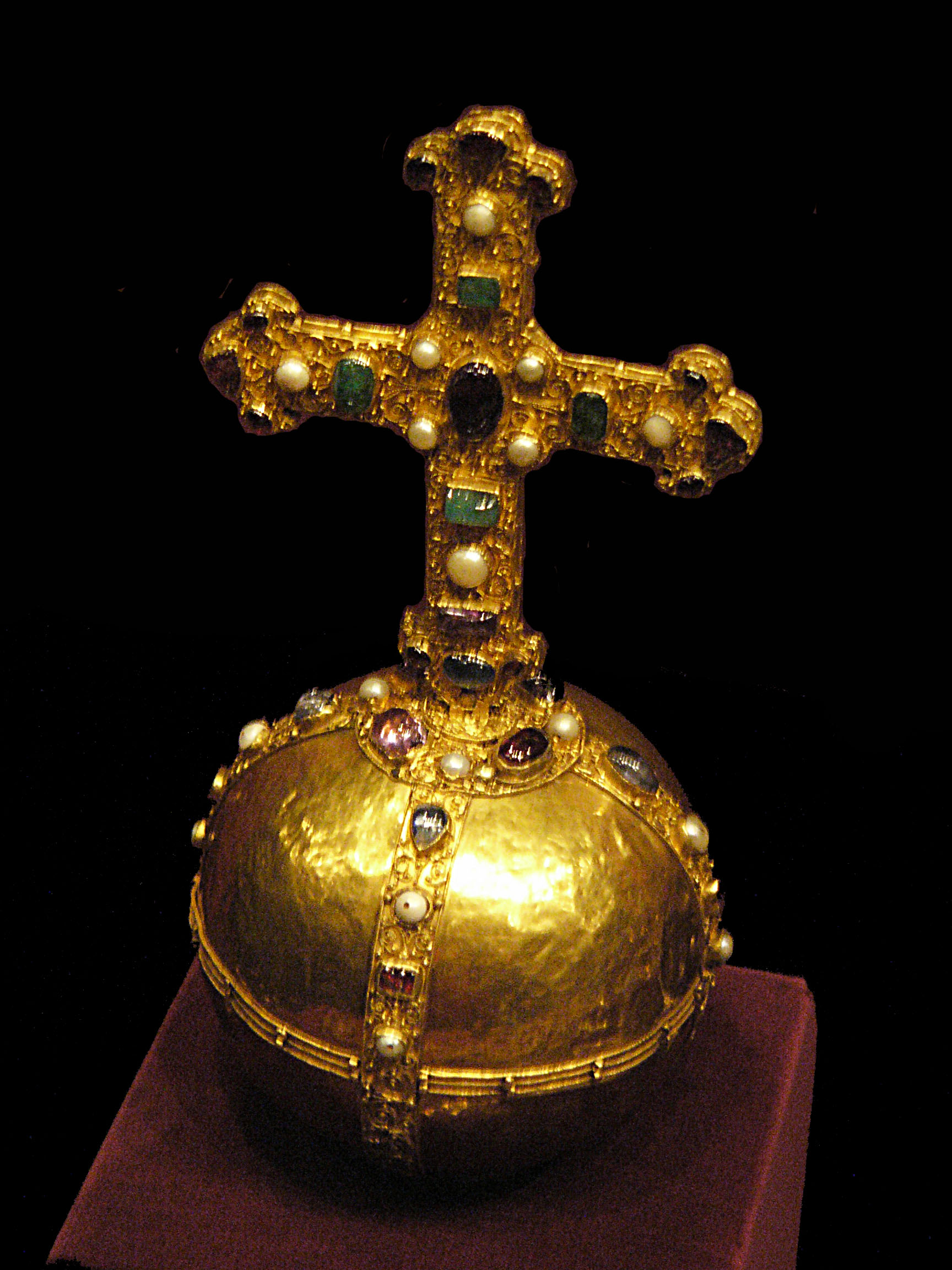
Imperial Orb of the Holy Roman Empire, part of the Imperial Regalia

The globus cruciger (Latin for 'cross-bearing orb'), also known as "the orb and cross" or stavroforos sphaira (Greek: σταυροφόρος σφαίρα), is an orb surmounted by a cross. It has been a Christian symbol of authority since the Middle Ages, used on coins, in iconography, and with a sceptre as royal regalia.

The cross laid over the globus represents Christ's dominion over the world, literally held in the hand of a worthy earthly ruler. In the iconography of Western art, when Christ himself holds the globe, he is called Salvator Mundi (Latin for 'Saviour of the World'). For instance, the 16th-century Infant Jesus of Prague statue holds a globus cruciger in this manner.

== History ==
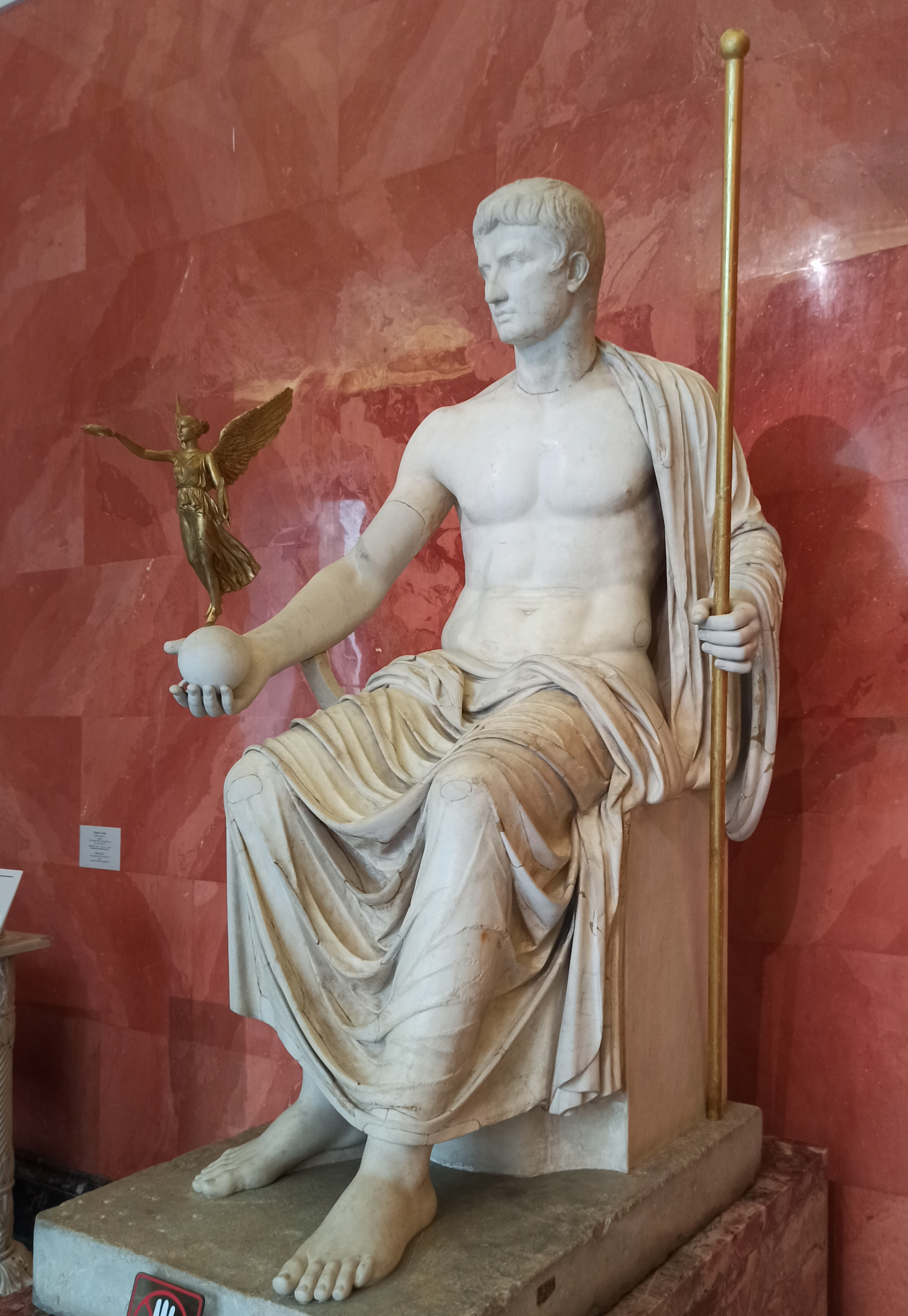
Augustus as Jove, holding scepter and orb, first half of 1st century AD

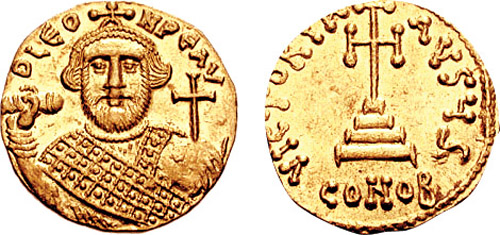
The globus cruciger was used in the Byzantine Empire, as shown in this coin of Emperor Leontius (died 705)

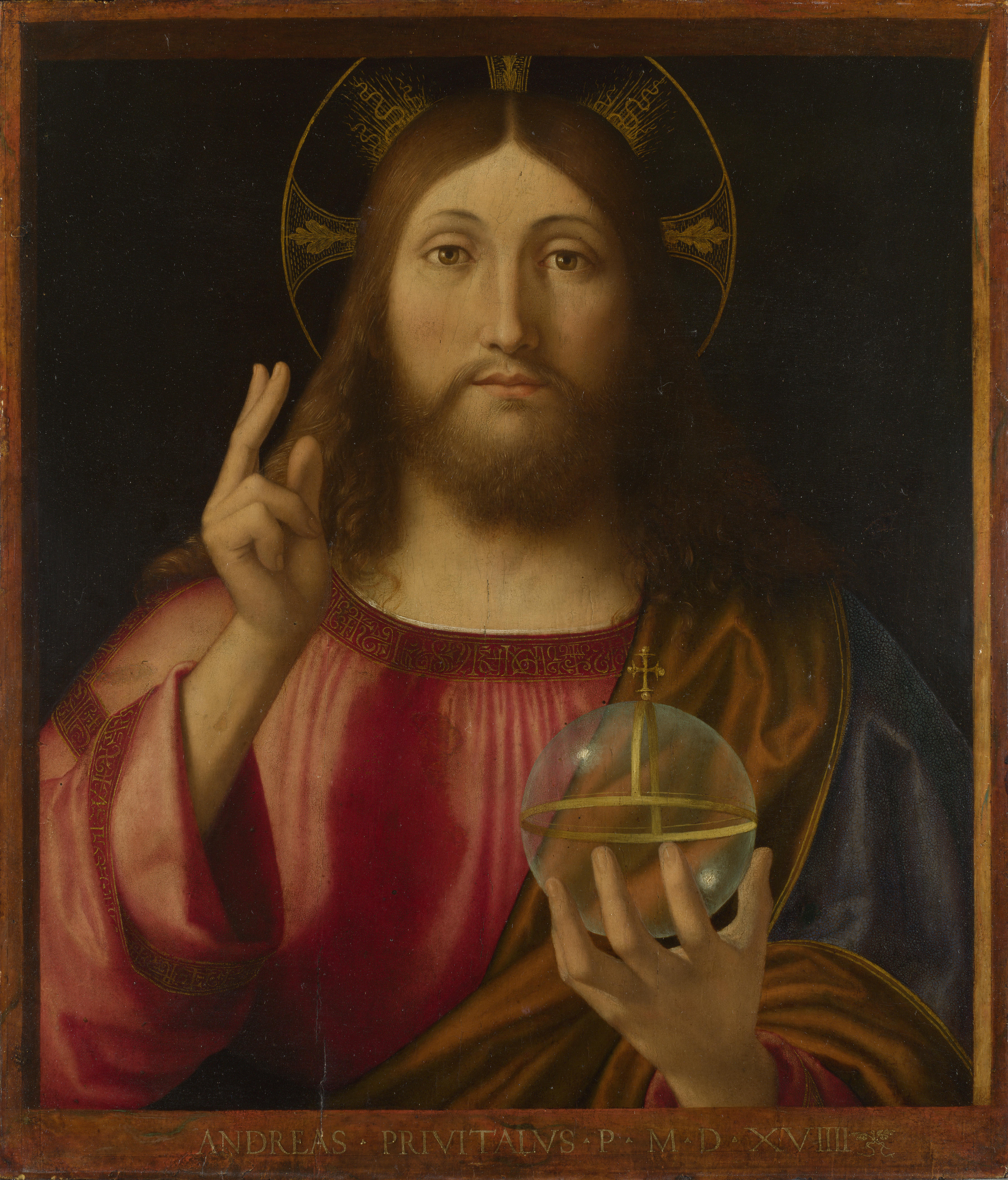
Christ as Salvator Mundi with globus cruciger by Andrea Previtali

Holding the world in one's hand, or, more ominously, under one's foot, has been a symbol since antiquity. To citizens of the Roman Empire, the plain spherical globe held by the god Jupiter represented the world or the universe, as the dominion held by the emperor. A 2nd-century coin from the reign of Emperor Hadrian shows the Roman goddess Salus with her foot upon a globus, and a 4th-century coin from the reign of Emperor Constantine I shows him with a globus in hand. The orbis terrarum was central to the iconography of the Tetrarchy, in which it represented the tetrarchs' restoration of security to the Roman world. Constantine I claimed to have had a vision of symbol of Christ above the sun, with the words "In this sign, you shall conquer" (Latin: "In hoc signo vinces"), before the Battle of Milvian Bridge in AD 312. This symbol is usually assumed to be the "Chi-Rho (XP)" symbol, but some think it was a cross. Consequently, his soldiers painted this symbol on their shields and then defeated their foe, Maxentius.

With the growth of Christianity in the 5th century, the orb (in Latin works orbis terrarum, the 'world of the lands', whence "orb" derives) was surmounted with a cross, hence globus cruciger, symbolizing the Christian God's dominion of the world. The emperor held the world in his hand to show that he ruled it on behalf of God. To non-Christians already familiar with the pagan globe, the surmounting of a cross indicated the victory of Christianity over the world. In medieval iconography, the size of an object relative to those of nearby objects indicated its relative importance; therefore the orb was small and the one who held it was large to emphasize the nature of their relationship. Although the globe symbolized the whole Earth, many Christian rulers, some of them not even sovereign, who reigned over small territories of the Earth, used it symbolically.

One of the first known depictions in art of the symbol was in the late 4th century AD, possibly as early as AD 388, namely on the reverse side of the gold tremissii of Emperor Theodosius I.

The globus cruciger was associated with powerful rulers and angels; it adorned portrayals of both emperors and kings, and also archangels. It remained popular throughout the Middle Ages in coinage, iconography, and royal regalia. For example, it was often used by Byzantine emperors to symbolize their authority and sovereignty over the Christian world, usually being done via coinage. The symbol was meant to demonstrate that the emperor ruled both politically and divinely. The papacy, which in the Middle Ages rivaled the Holy Roman emperor in temporal power, also used the symbol on top of the papal tiara, which consisted of a triple crown; the pope did not use a separate orb as a symbol. The globus cruciger (made up of a monde and cross) was generally featured as the finial of European royal crowns, whether on physical crowns or merely in royal heraldry, for example, in Denmark, the Holy Roman Empire, Hungary, Italy, the Netherlands, Portugal, Romania, Spain, Sweden, and Yugoslavia. It is still depicted not only in the arms of European polities for which a monarchy survives, yet also, since the end of communism in 1991, in the arms of some eastern European polities, despite the termination of their historical monarchies. Even in the modern era in the United Kingdom, the Sovereign's Orb symbolizes both the state and Church of England under the protection and domain of the monarchy.

The globus cruciger is also routinely featured atop the domes of churches, from Saint Peter's in Rome, to Saint Paul's in London, and many others.

A crossless globe is often featured in the portraits of Mughal emperor Jahangir where it both signifies the meaning of his name ("world seizer") and symbolizes his sovereignty. In several contemporary portraits he is often shown standing atop a large cartographic globe or seated on a throne with his feet on a globe.

== Use as an alchemical symbol ==
The globus cruciger was used as the alchemical symbol (♁) for antimony. It was also used as an alchemical symbol for lupus metallorum "the grey wolf", supposedly used to purify alloyed metals into pure gold. Lupus metallorum (stibnite) was used to purify gold, as the sulphur in the antimony sulphide bonds to the metals alloyed with the gold, and these form a slag which can be removed. The gold remains dissolved in the metallic antimony which can be boiled off to leave the purified gold.

== Gallery ==
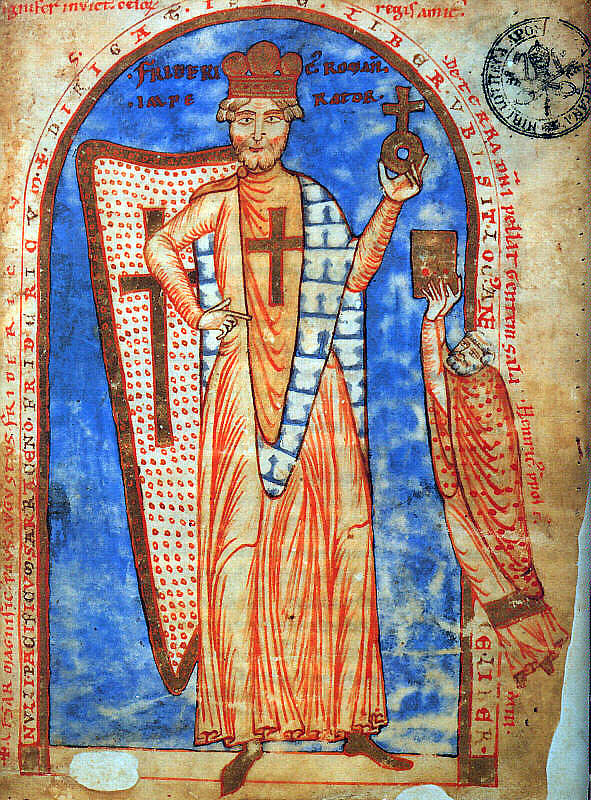
Emperor Frederick I Barbarossa

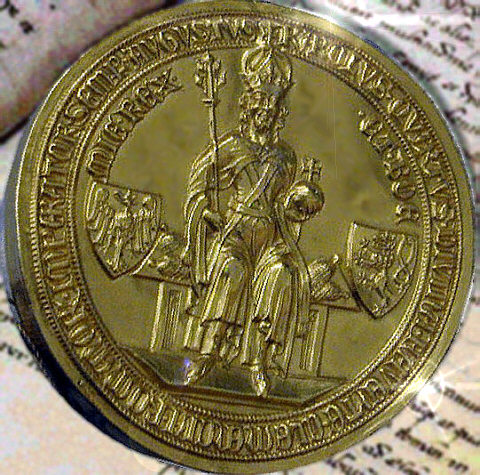
The Golden Bull of 1356 by the Charles IV, Holy Roman Emperor

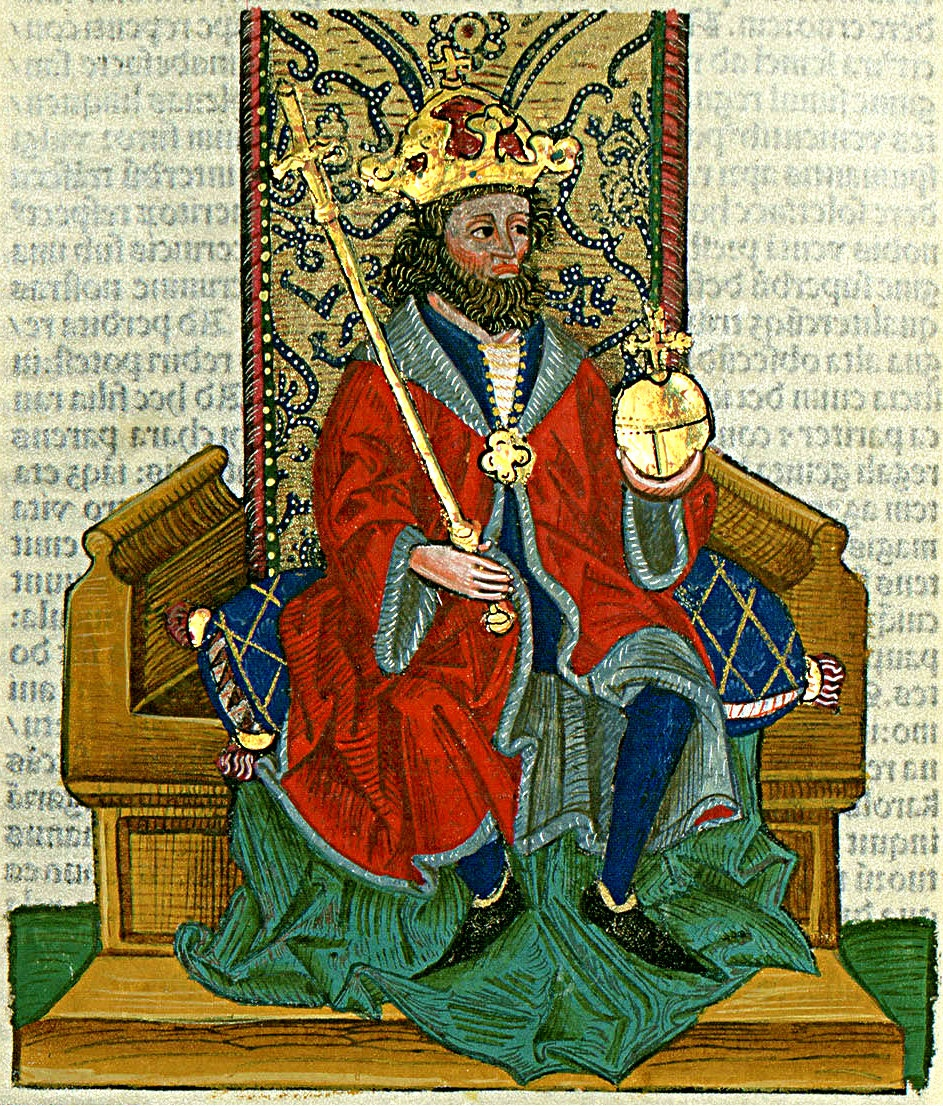
Charles II of Naples and Hungary

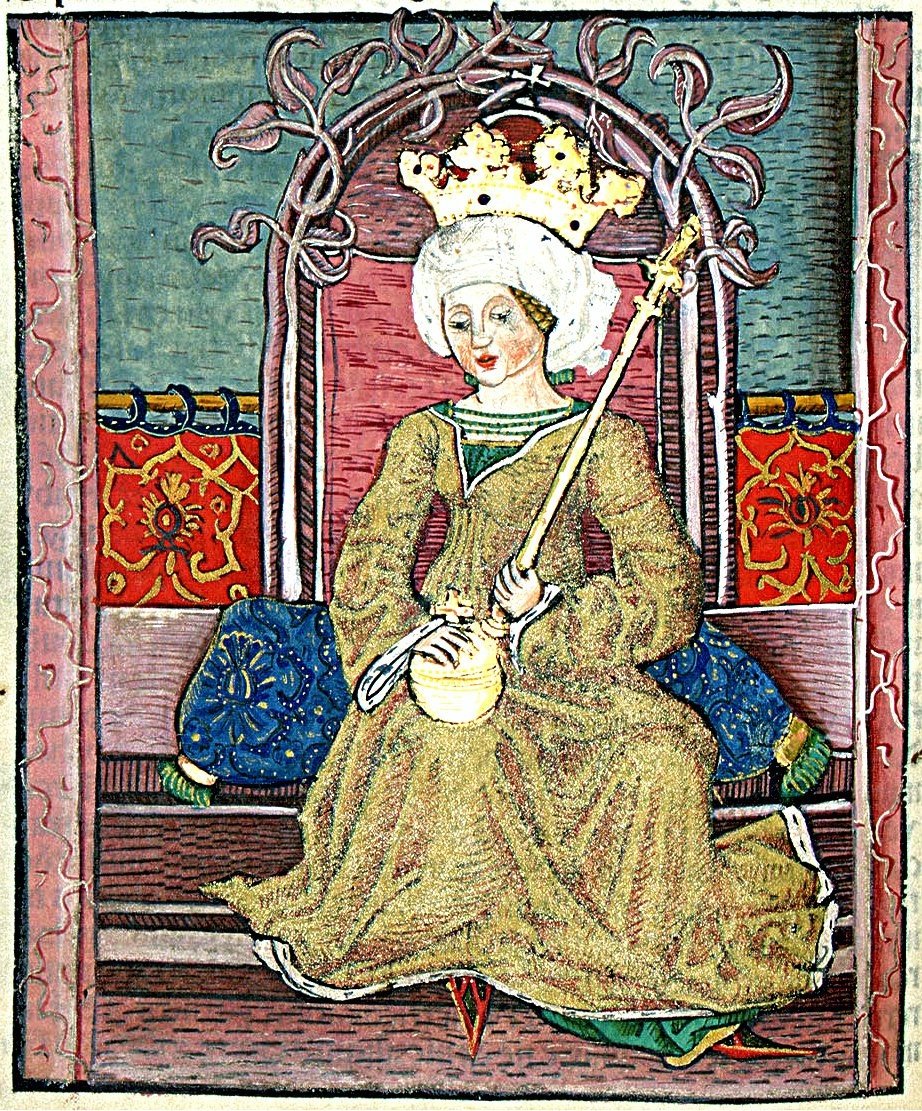
Mary of Hungary

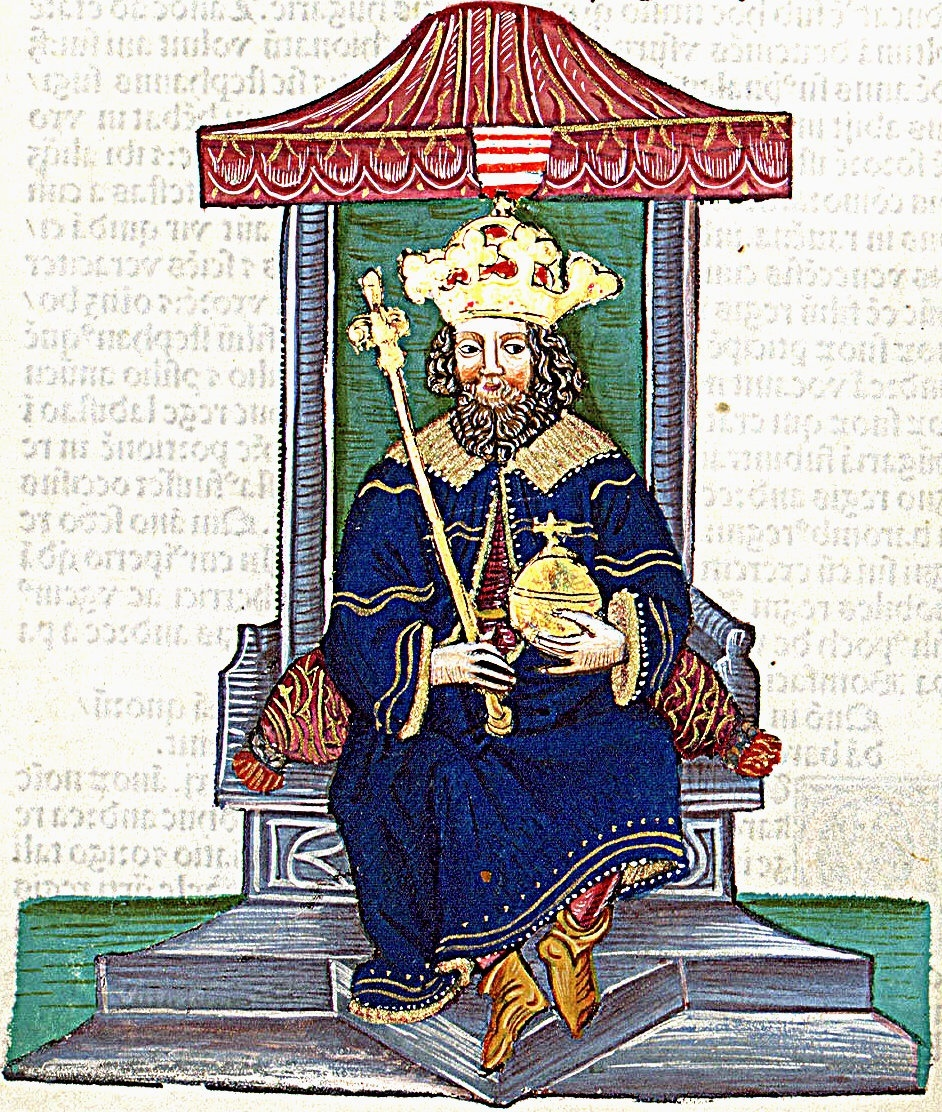
Wenceslaus III of Bohemia

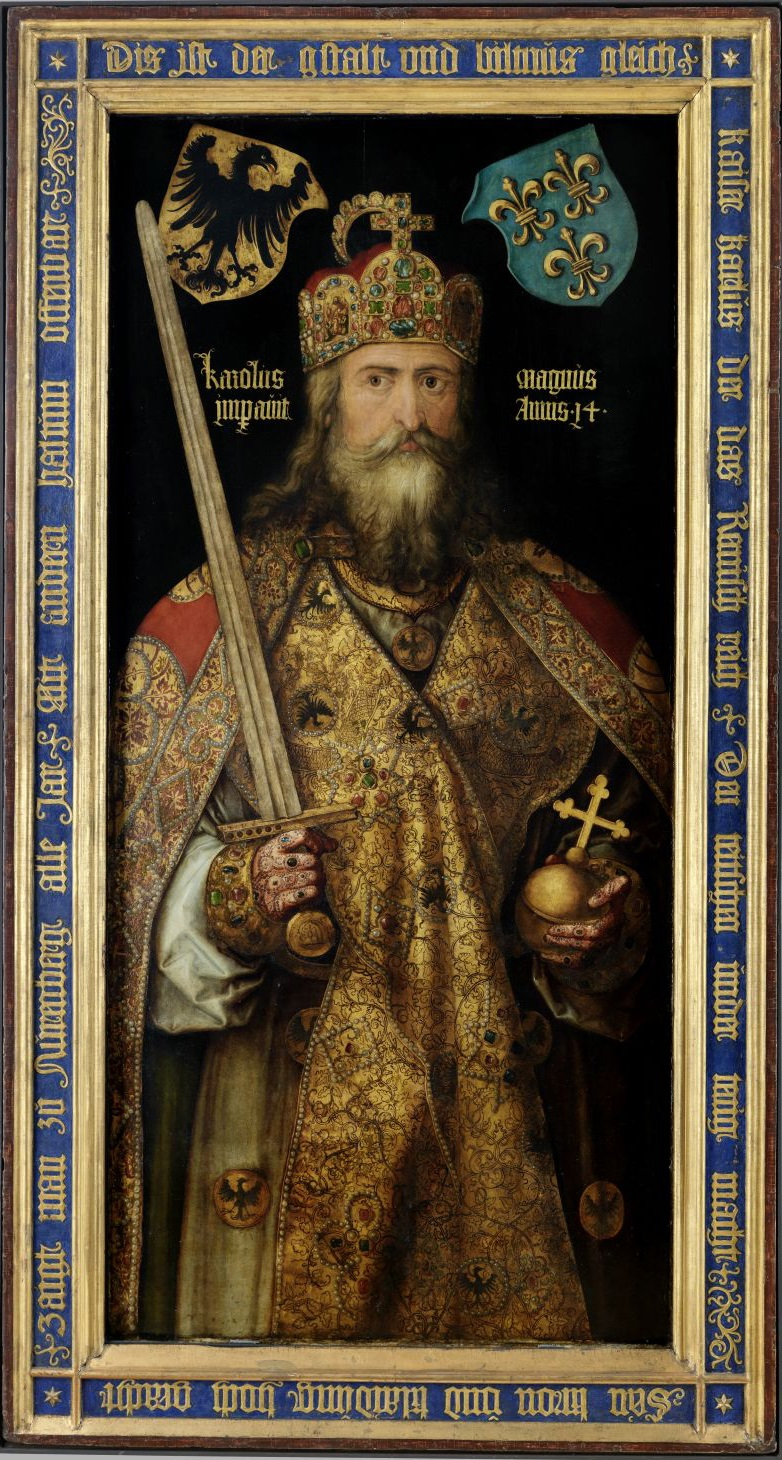
Charlemagne by Albrecht Dürer

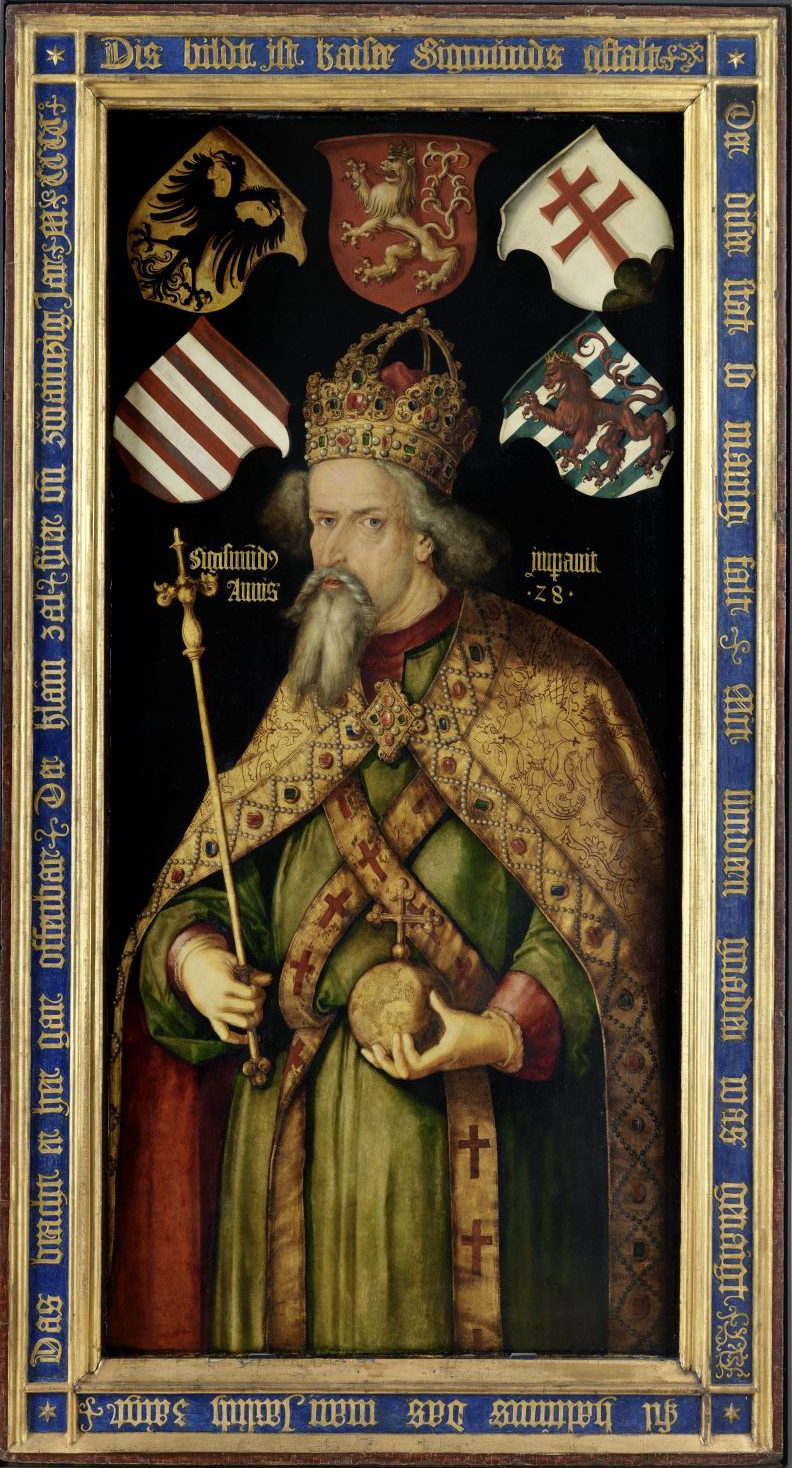
Sigismund, Holy Roman Emperor by Albrecht Dürer

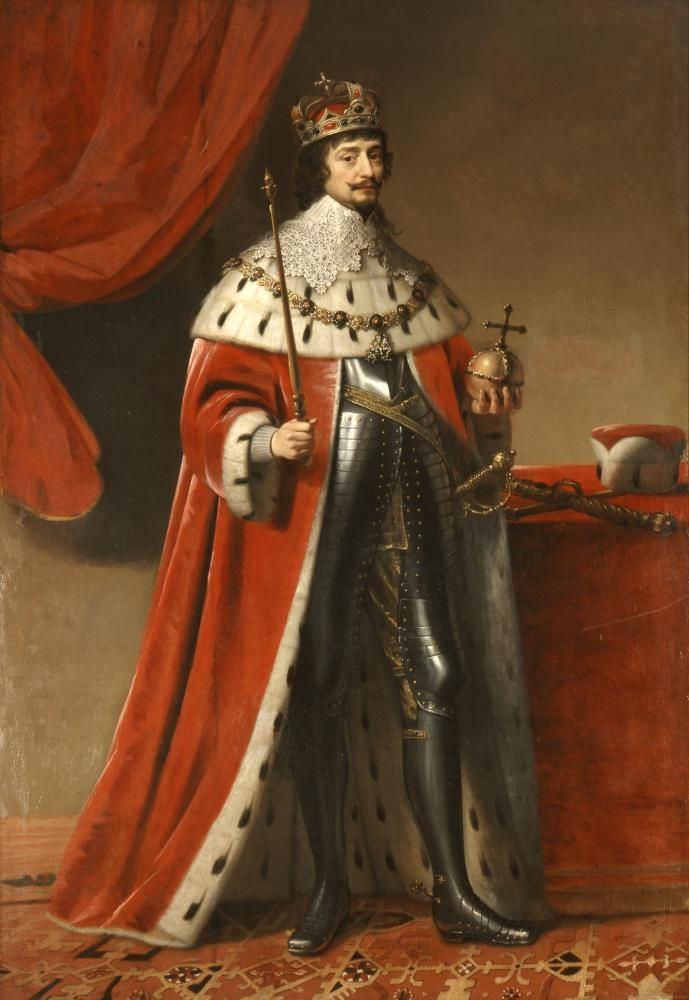
Frederick V holding the orb

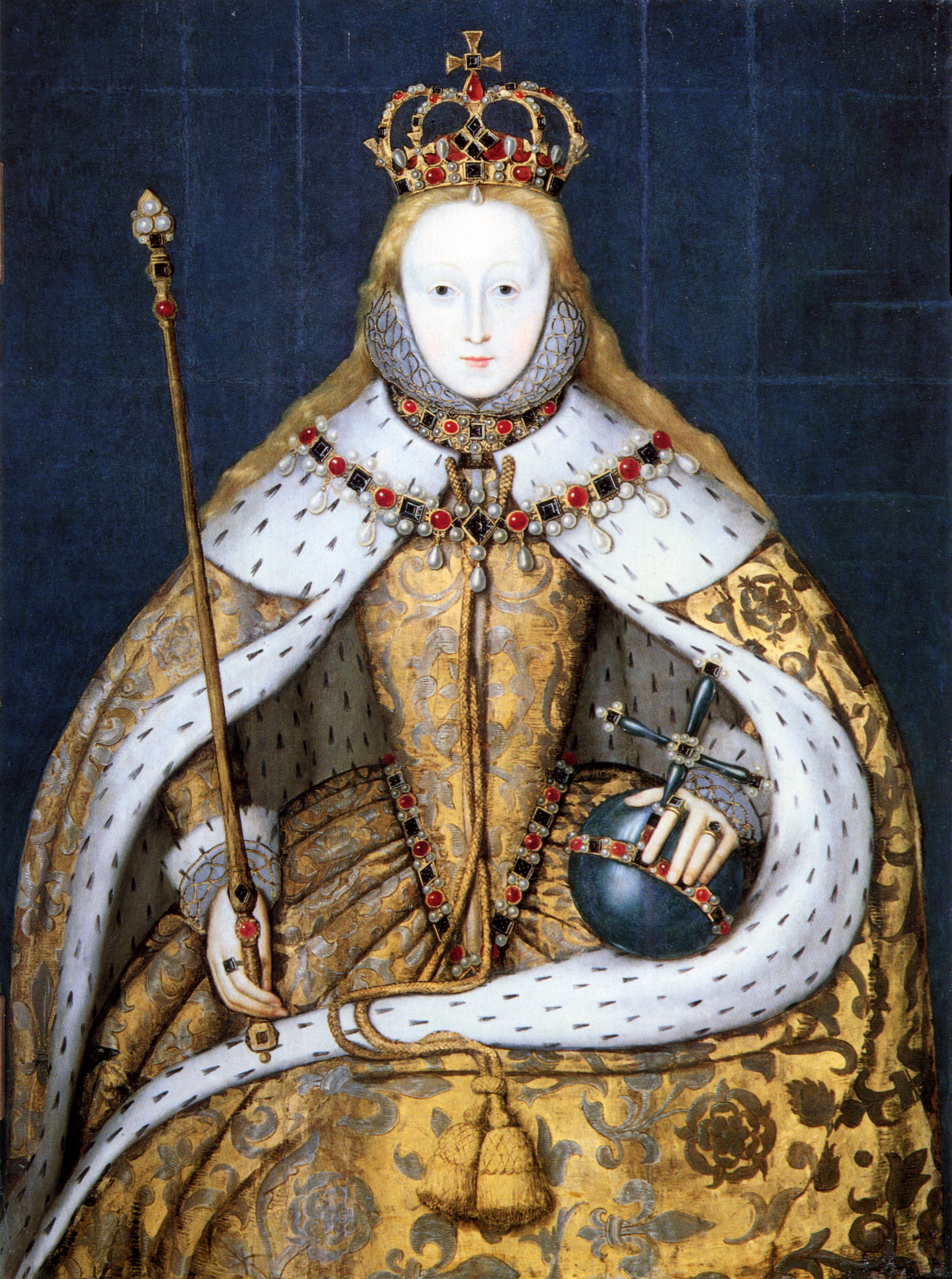
Elizabeth I of England in coronation robes, with orb and sceptre

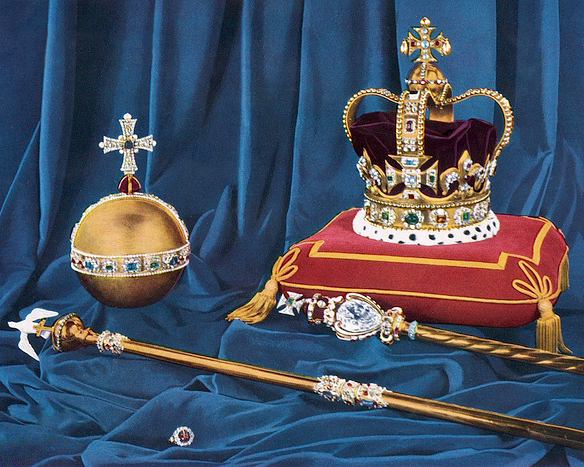
Primary Crown Jewels of the United Kingdom, with Sovereign's Orb at upper left (in late 1952 before the coronation of Elizabeth II)

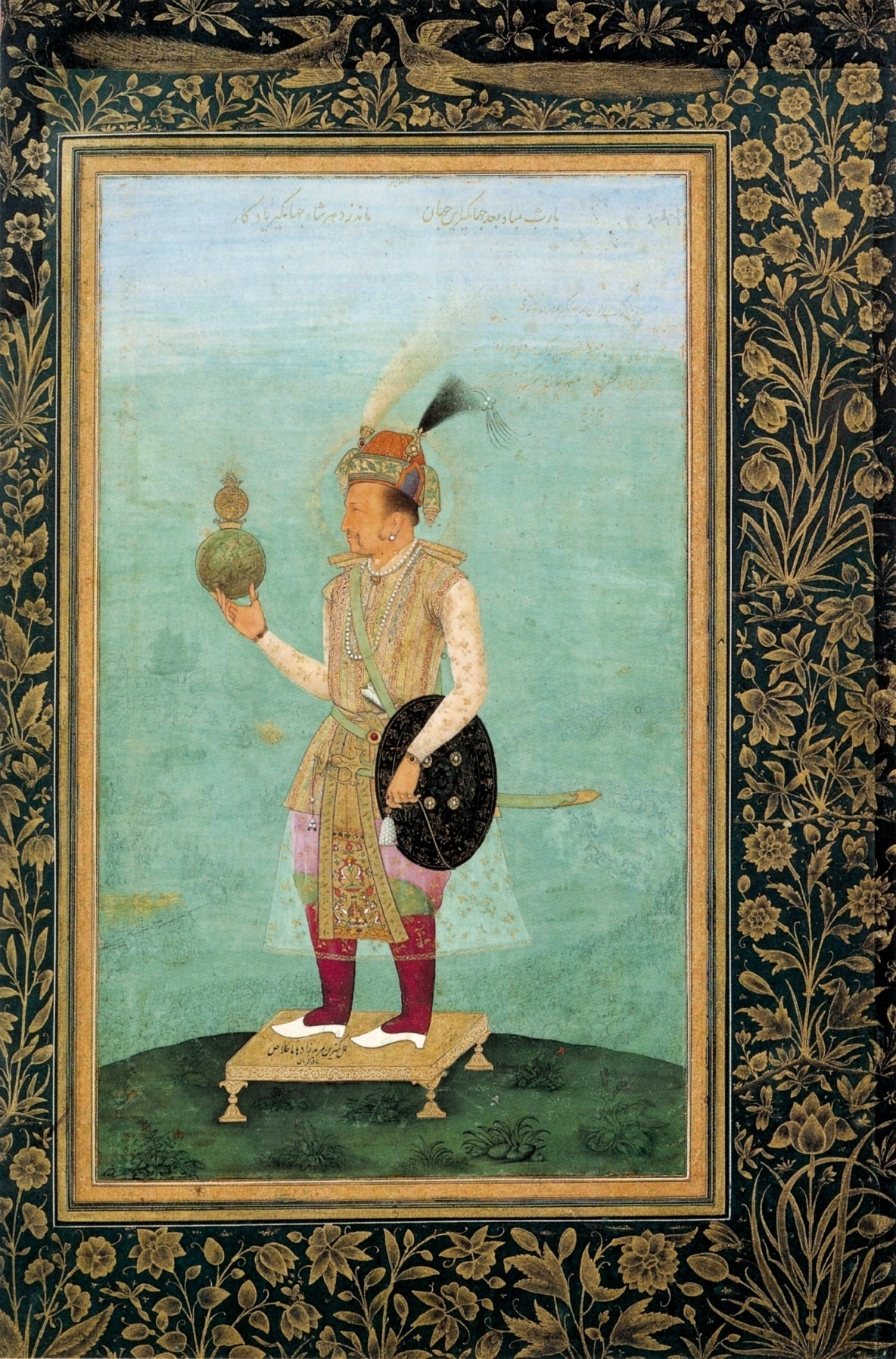
Jahangir holding an orb

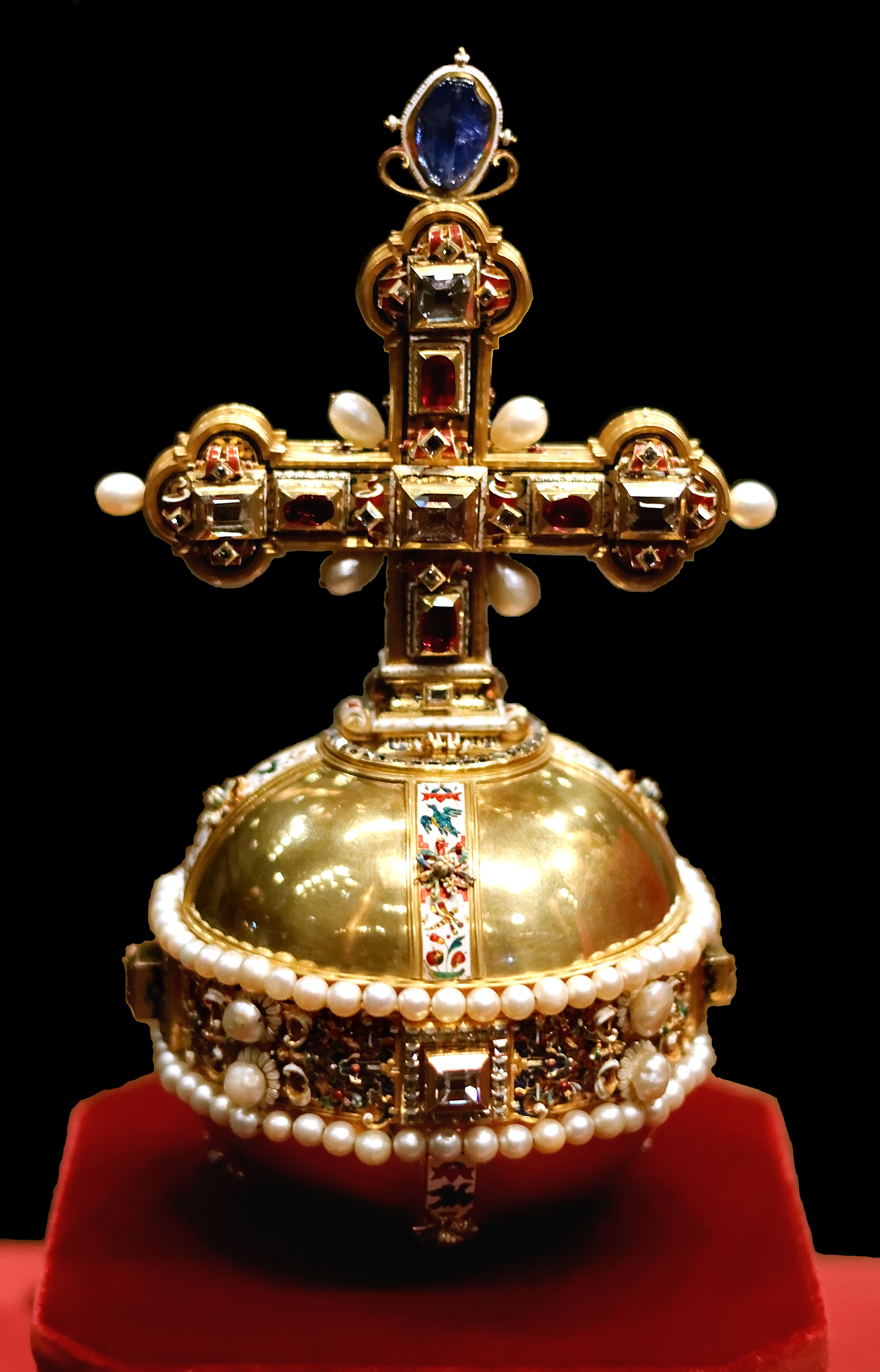
Imperial orb of Austria

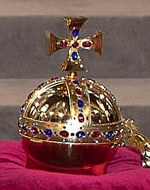
Dutch globus cruciger, part of the Regalia of the Netherlands

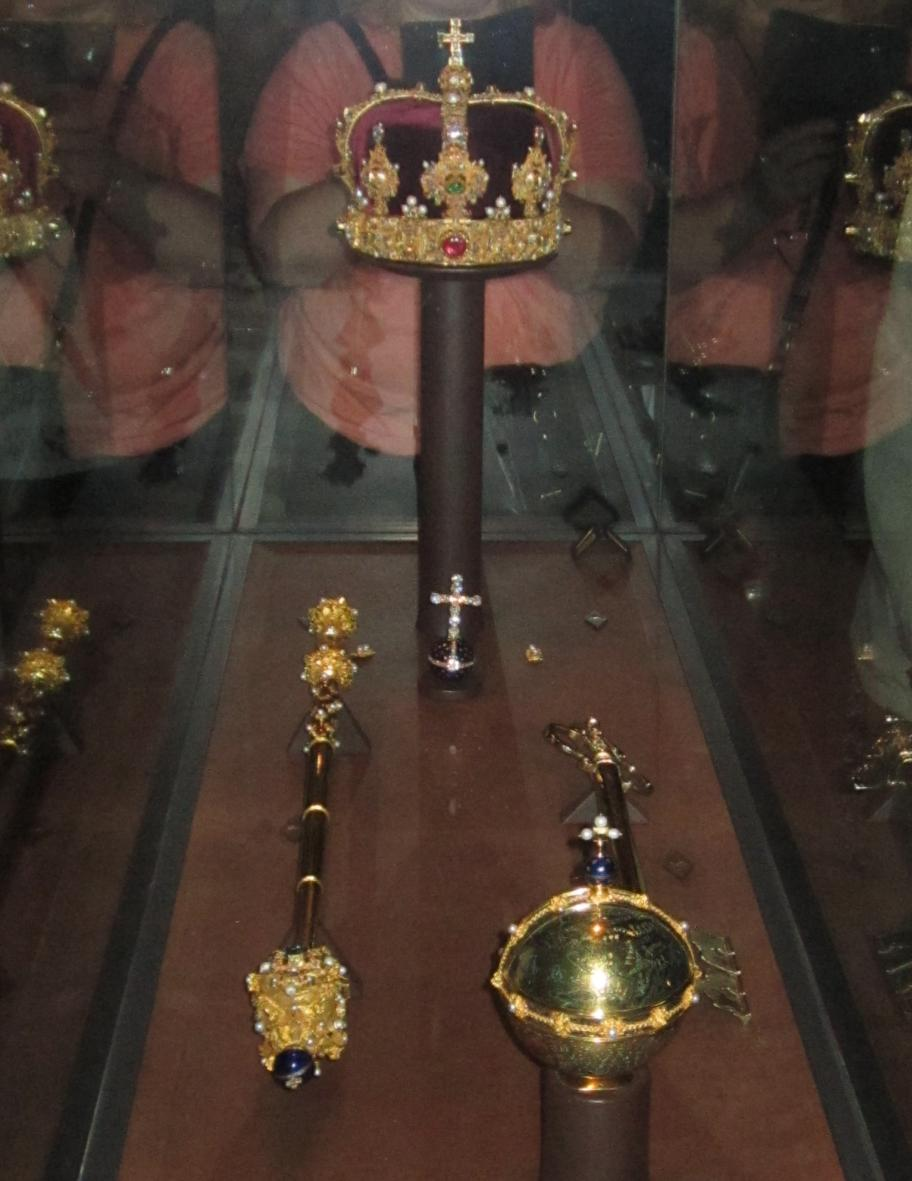
Regalia of Sweden with the orb

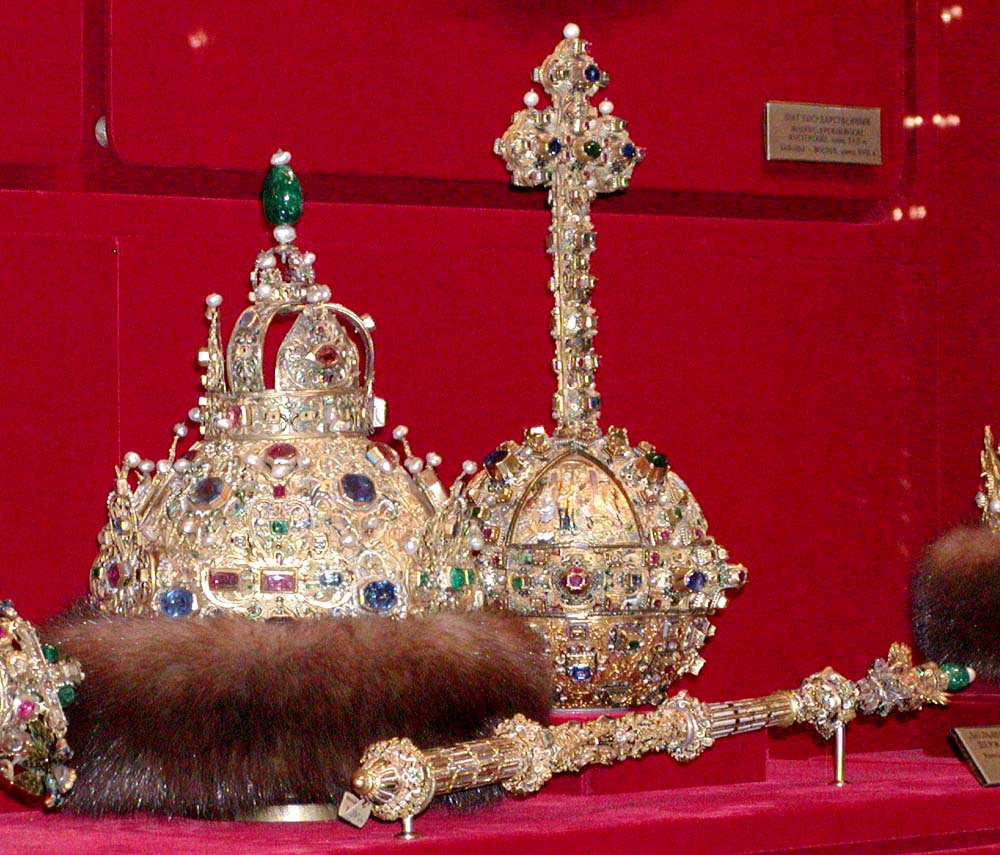
Regalia of Russia

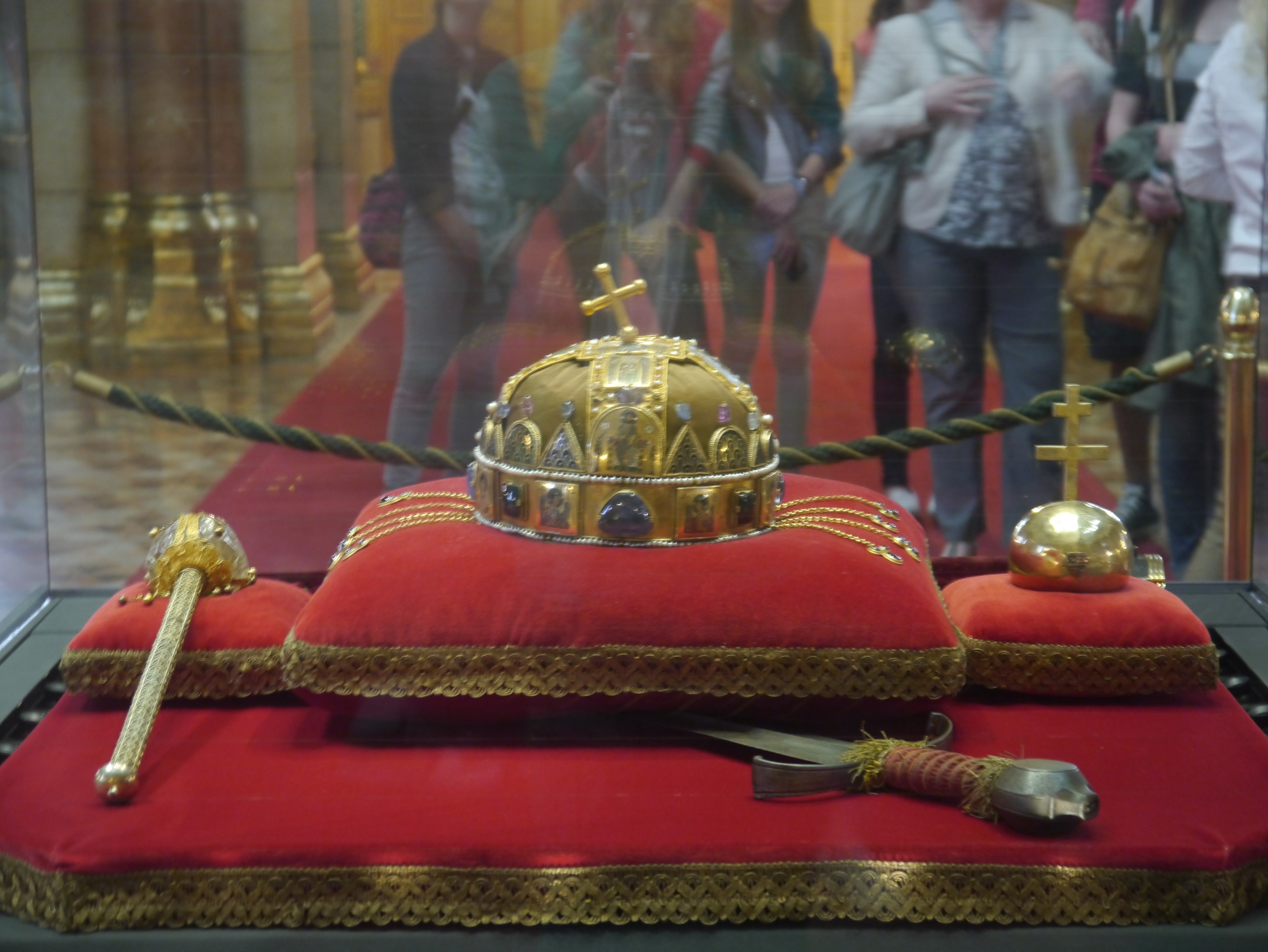
Regalia of Hungary with the orb; note the patriarchal cross on the orb

Coat of arms of Uppland

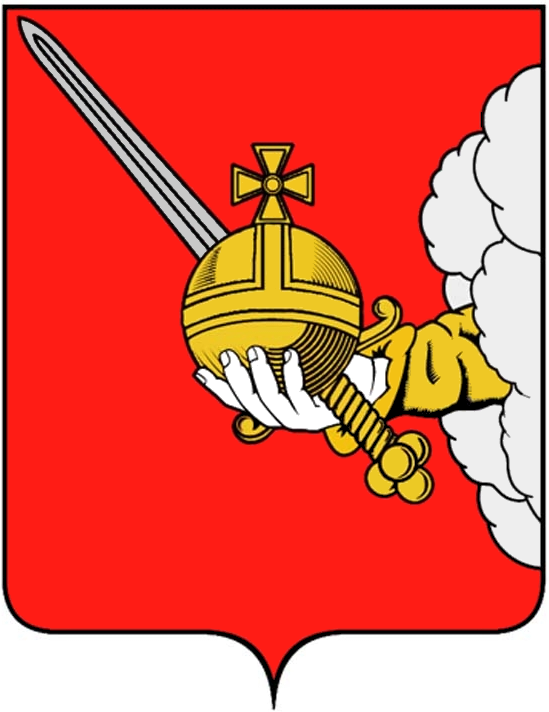
Coat of arms of Vologda

Orb and sceptre in the coat of arms of Montenegro; several other coats of arms use them in the same manner.

Chromolithograph of Jesus as a child, holding an orb and a crown of thorns

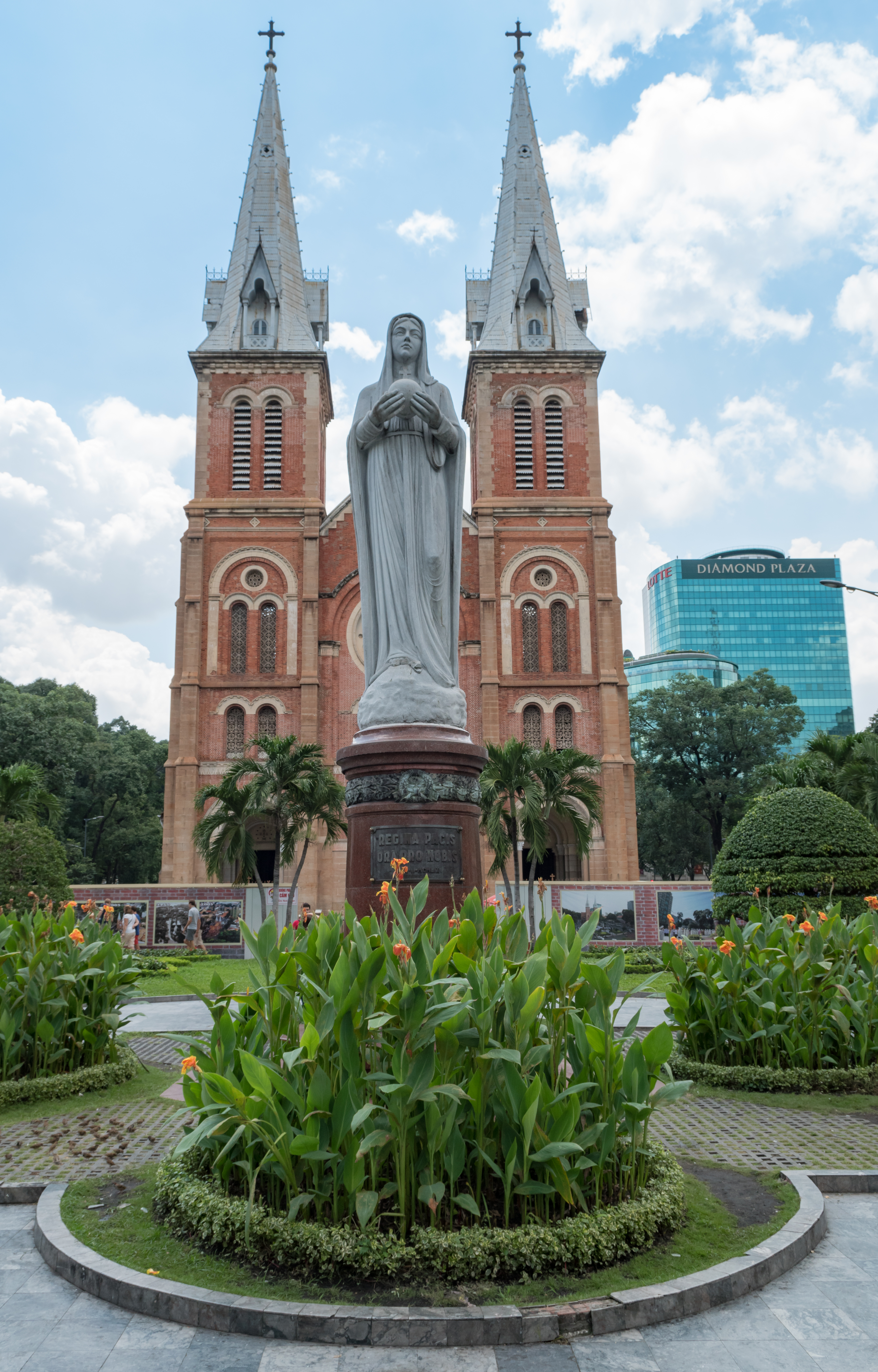
Statue of Virgin Mary holding an orb

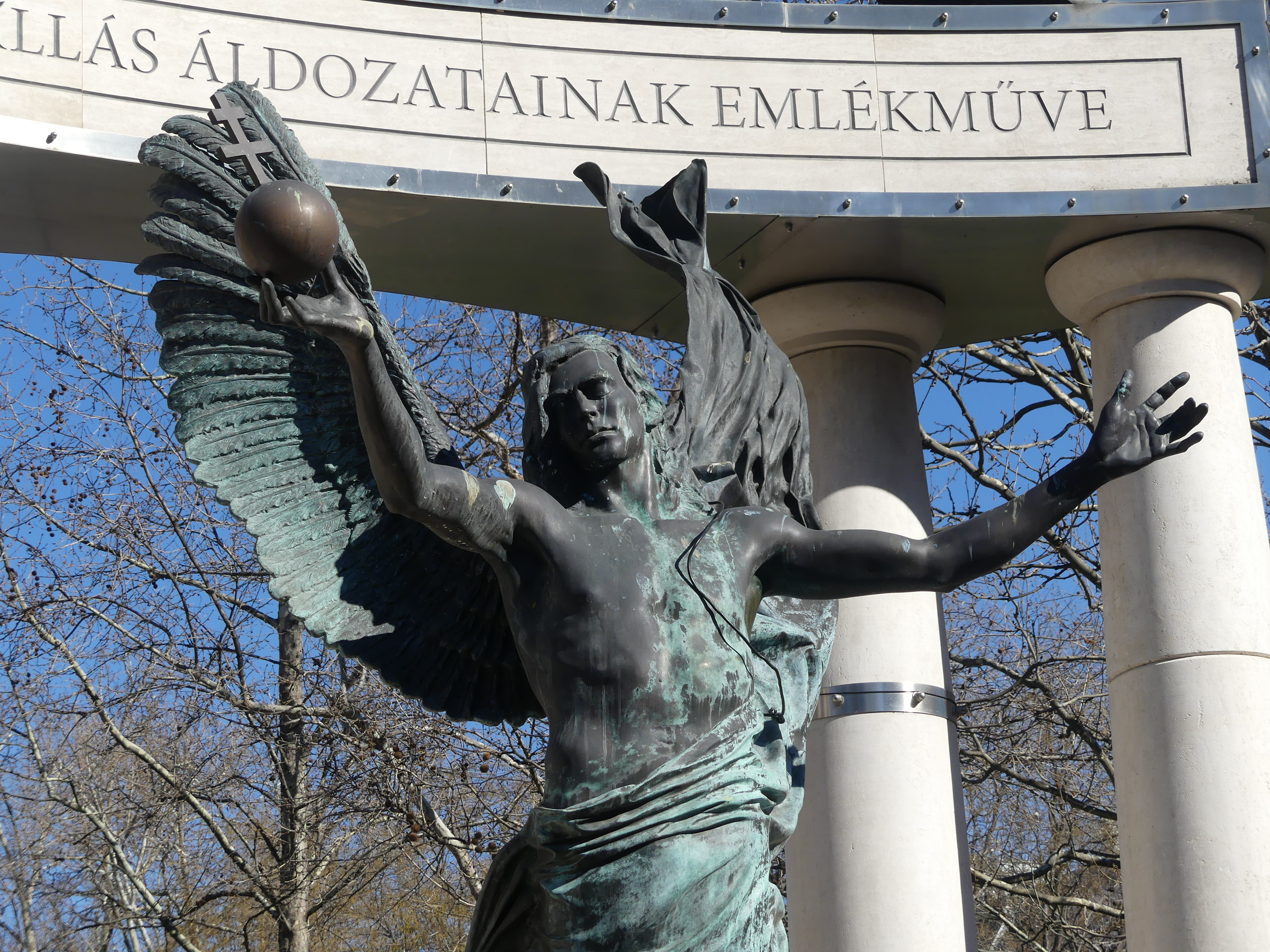
Statue of Archangel Gabriel holding an orb

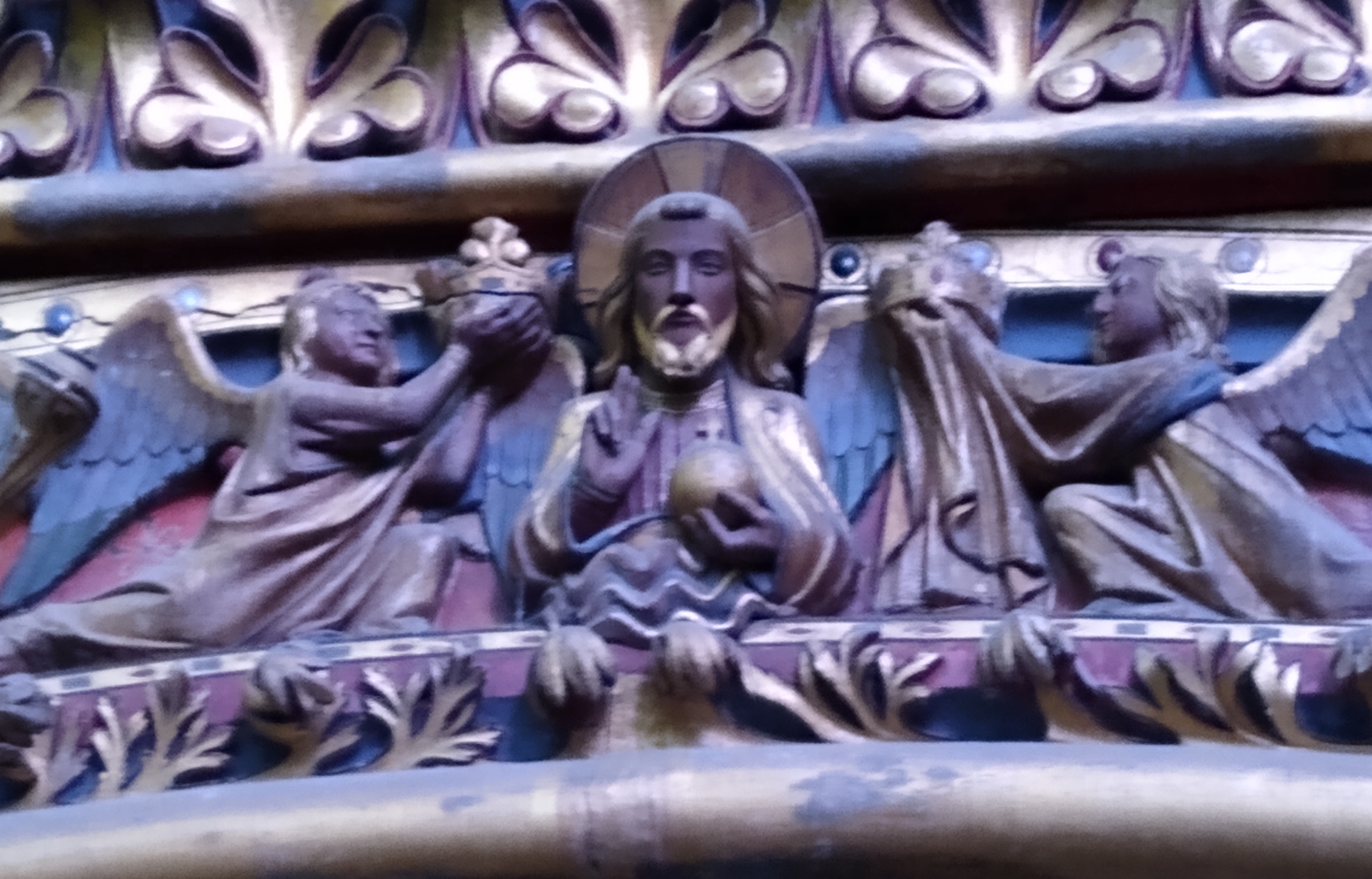
Wall sculpture in Sainte-Chapelle, Paris

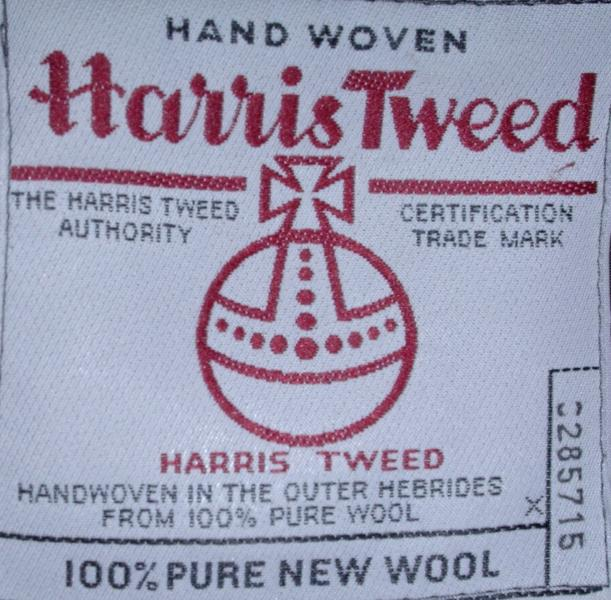
The Harris tweed orb

== See also ==
- Apfelgroschen – coin depicting the orb and cross of the Holy Roman Empire
- The Ball and the Cross
- Celestial spheres
- Cintamani
- Earth symbol
- Holy Hand Grenade of Antioch
- Monde (crown)
- T and O map
- Venus symbol
