= Uppland =

Historical province of Sweden

Coordinates: 60°N 18°E

- Historical province
- Flag Coat of arms

- Country: Sweden
- Land: Svealand
- Counties: Uppsala County; Stockholm County

Area
  - Total: 12,813 km^{2} (4,947 sq mi)

Population (31 December 2023)
  - Total: 1,757,151
  - Density: 137.14/km^{2} (355.19/sq mi)

Ethnicity
  - Languages: Uppländska; Stockholmska

Culture
  - Flower: Leper lily
  - Animal: White-tailed eagle
  - Bird: —
  - Fish: Aspius
- Time zone: UTC+1 (CET)
  - Summer (DST): UTC+2 (CEST)

Uppland is a historical province or landskap on the eastern coast of Sweden, just north of Stockholm, the capital. It borders Södermanland, Västmanland and Gästrikland. It is also bounded by lake Mälaren and the Baltic Sea.

The name literally means up land, a name which is commonly encountered in especially older English literature as Upland. Its Latinised form, which is occasionally used, is Uplandia.

Uppland is often called the province of "castles, ancient remains and runestones" and is famous for having the highest concentration of runestones in the world, with as many as 1,196 inscriptions in stone left by the Vikings, many of whom came from Roslagen on the coast of Uppland. Many of its castles and places of historical interest include Drottningholm Palace, Skokloster Castle, Salsta Castle, the medieval Uppsala Cathedral, where many royals are buried, and Uppsala Castle.

Famous people from Uppland or who lived in Uppland include Ingmar Bergman, St. Bridget of Sweden, Carl Linnaeus, Anders Celsius and Gustav Vasa.

It has Sweden's oldest town, Sigtuna, thought to have been established around AD 980 and Uppsala University, Sweden's oldest university.

== Administration ==
The traditional provinces of Sweden serve no administrative or political purposes, but are historical and cultural entities. The corresponding administrative county, or län, is Uppsala County, which occupies the larger part of the territory. The bulk of the population, however, is within Stockholm County. Minor parts of the province are also in Västmanland, Gävleborg, and Södermanland Counties.

== Heraldry ==
Uppland's arms were granted in 1560, distinctive in its depiction of a globus cruciger. Historically, Uppland ranked as a duchy and the coat of arms is represented with a ducal coronet, blazoned thus: "Gules, a Royal Orb Or gemmed of the field and Azure with the cross bottoned Argent." Despite the fact that the Uppsala County has a different name and a smaller territory, it was granted the same coat of arms in 1940.

== Geography ==
Uppland was historically divided into chartered cities and districts. Within Roslagen they were called skeppslag (which roughly means "ship district"), and in the rest of the province hundreds. The abovementioned districts and cities have no administrative function today.

On the small uninhabited island of Märket in the Baltic, Uppland has a very short and unusually shaped land border with Åland, an autonomous province of Finland.

=== Cities ===
- Djursholm (1913)
- Enköping (approximately 1300)
- Lidingö (1926)
- Norrtälje (1622)
- Sigtuna (approximately 990)
- Solna (1943)
- Stockholm (1252) - northern part of city only. The southern part belongs to Södermanland
- Sundbyberg (1927)
- Uppsala (1286)
- Vaxholm (1652)
- Öregrund (1491)
- Östhammar (approximately 1300)

=== Districts ===
- Bro Hundred
- Bälinge Hundred
- Frösåker Hundred
- Färentuna Hundred
- Hagunda Hundred
- Håbo Hundred
- Lagunda Hundred
- Ly Hundred
- Lång Hundred
- Norunda Hundred
- Närding Hundred
- Oland Hundred
- Rasbo Hundred
- Seming Hundred
- Simtuna Hundred
- Sju Hundred
- Sollentuna Hundred
- Torstuna Hundred
- Trögd Hundred
- Ulleråker Hundred
- Vaksala Hundred
- Vallentuna Hundred
- Våla Hundred
- Åsunda Hundred
- Ärling Hundred
- Örbyhus Hundred
- Bro and Vätö Ship District
- Danderyd Ship District
- Frötuna and Länna Ship District
- Väddö and Häverö Ship District
- Värmdö Ship District
- Åker Ship District

=== Facts ===
- Highest mountain: Upplandsberget at Siggeforasjön, 117 metres
- Most Runestones: as many as 1,196 inscriptions in stone
- Largest lake: Mälaren
- Archipelago: Roslagen
- National Parks: Ängsö, Färnebofjärden

=== Population ===
The population of Uppland was 1,602,652 as of 31 December 2016. The provincial population corresponds to the different overlapping counties as follows:

| County | Population |
|---|---|
| Stockholm County, partly | 1,240,191 |
| Uppsala County, entirely | 361,373 |
| Västmanland County, partly | 1,088 |

== History ==
The earliest unambiguous mention of the province of Uppland comes from the year 1296, when it was mentioned that it included the Folklands of Fjärdhundraland, Attundaland, Tiundaland and Roslagen. The Swedish capital of Stockholm is divided between two provinces. The southern half lies in Södermanland and the northern half in Uppland.

=== Dukes and duchess ===
- Prince Waldemar (1310–1318 – also Öland)
  - Ingeborg Eriksdottir of Norway, his wife (1312–1318 – also Öland)
- Prince Gustav (1827–1852)
- Prince Sigvard (1907–1934)

== Religion ==
Uppsala is the seat of the only archbishop of the Lutheran Church of Sweden. Before the Protestant Reformation, the archdiocese and archbishop were within the Roman Catholic Church.

== Culture ==
The archaeological site Birka and the castle of Drottningholm are UNESCO World Heritage Sites.

== Sports ==
Football in the province is administered by Upplands Fotbollförbund. Bandy is also popular, with IK Sirius as the major sports club.
