= Louis Jean Desprez =

French painter and architect (1743–1804)

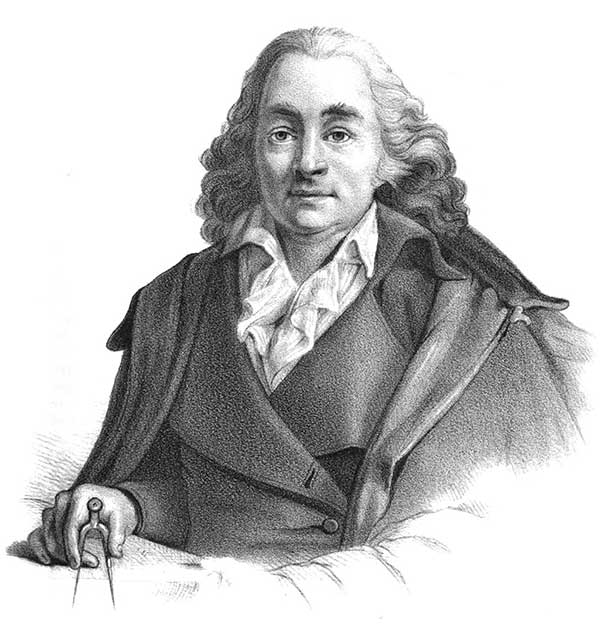
Louis Jean Desprez; posthumous lithograph by Henrik Wallgren (1795-1857), after a work done from life.

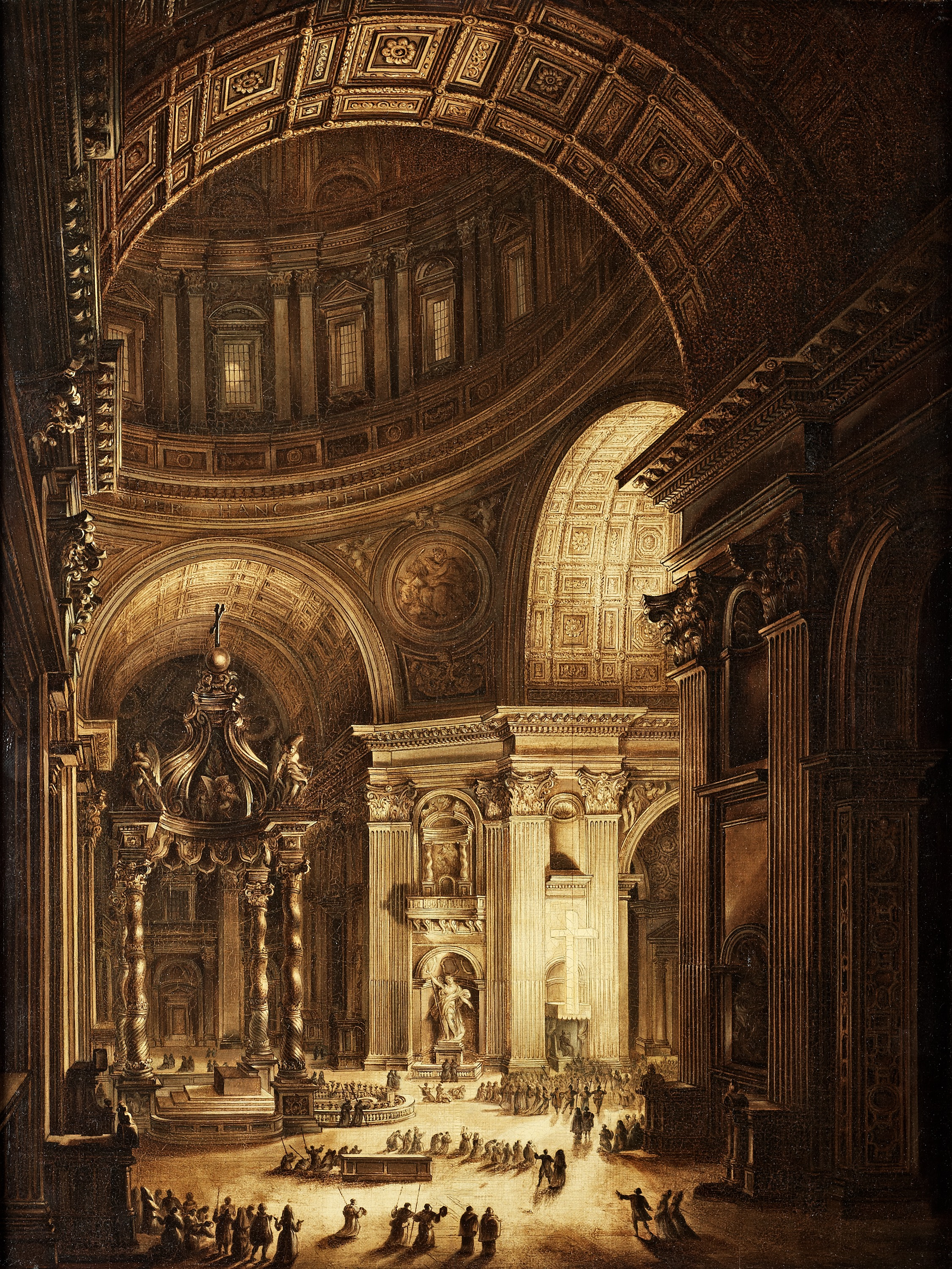
Illumination de la Croix de Saint Pierre à Rome

Louis Jean Desprez (occasionally but incorrectly Jean Louis Desprez) (28 May 1743–18 March 1804) was a French painter and architect who worked in Sweden during the last twenty years of his life.

== Biography ==
Desprez, who was born in Auxerre in Bourgogne, France. He studied architecture and was awarded the Great Prize of the Académie royale d'architecture in 1776. He lived in Italy from 1777 to 1784 and was associated with Piranesi in Rome. He came to the attention of King Gustav III of Sweden, who offered him a two-year contract as director of scenic decorations at the new Stockholm Opera founded by the King two years earlier. His first task there was the decorations for the new opera Gustaf Wasa (with a libretto authored by the King in collaboration with Johan Henric Kellgren and music by Johann Gottlieb Naumann).

As an architect, Desprez designed in a monumental, neoclassical style influenced by his study of Greek and Roman ruins in the south of Italy and in Sicily. A good example of this is Hämeenlinna Church in Finland - Finland at that time still being part of the Swedish kingdom - completed in 1799. His greatest project was one never realized: the magnificent new palace planned by the King for the Haga Park outside Stockholm, the Haga Great Palace. Because of lack of money, only the foundations were ever built and the project was abandoned after the assassination of the King. The smaller "royal pavilion" which stands at Haga was built by architect, Olof Tempelman.

His most significant completed project was the conservatory building in the new botanical garden in Uppsala, inaugurated after his death on May 13, 1807, the 100th anniversary of Linnaeus's birth. He also built the Villa Frescati in 1791-92 for Gustaf Mauritz Armfelt, after which the whole Frescati area in Stockholm later was named.

== Selected works ==
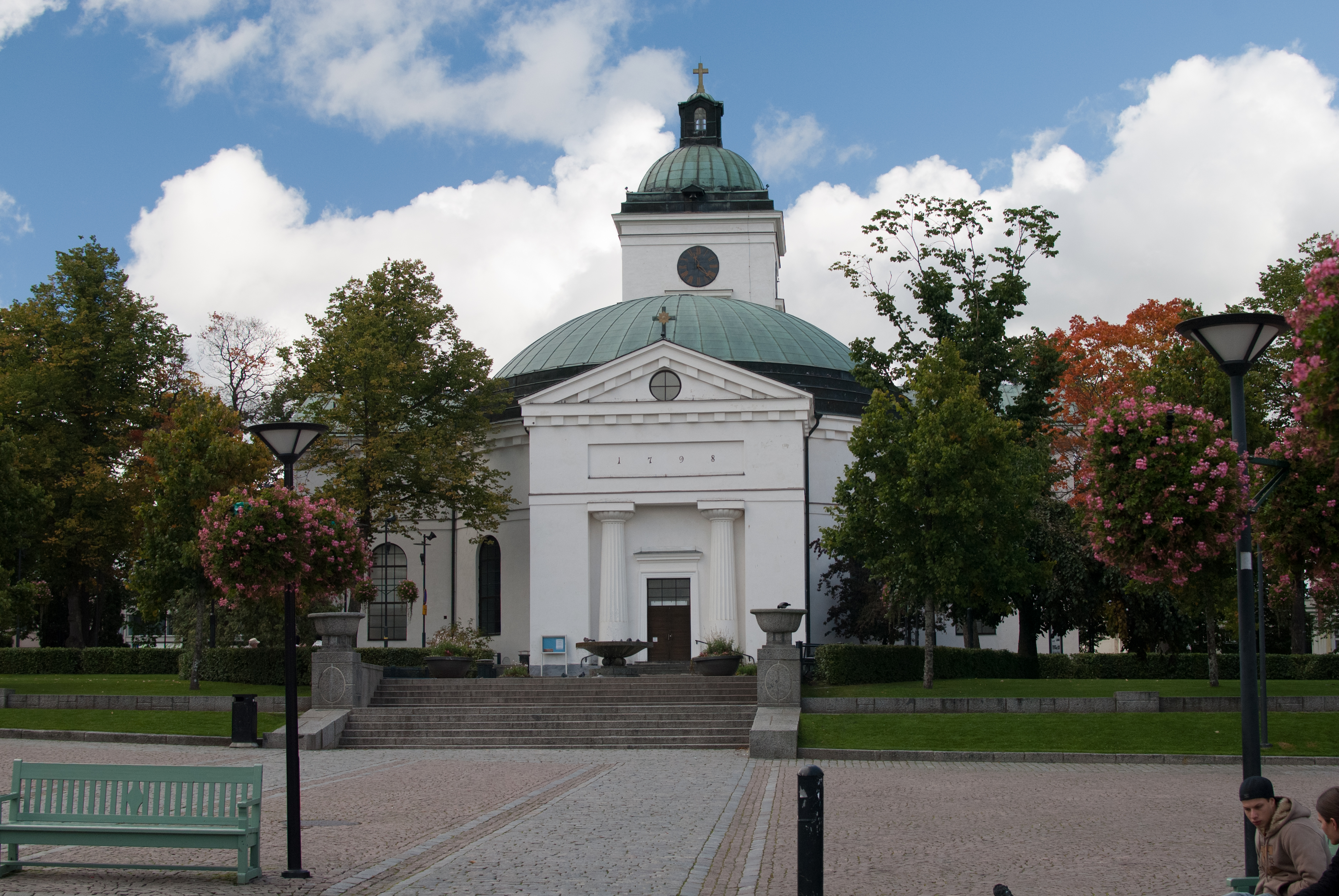
Hämeenlinna Church

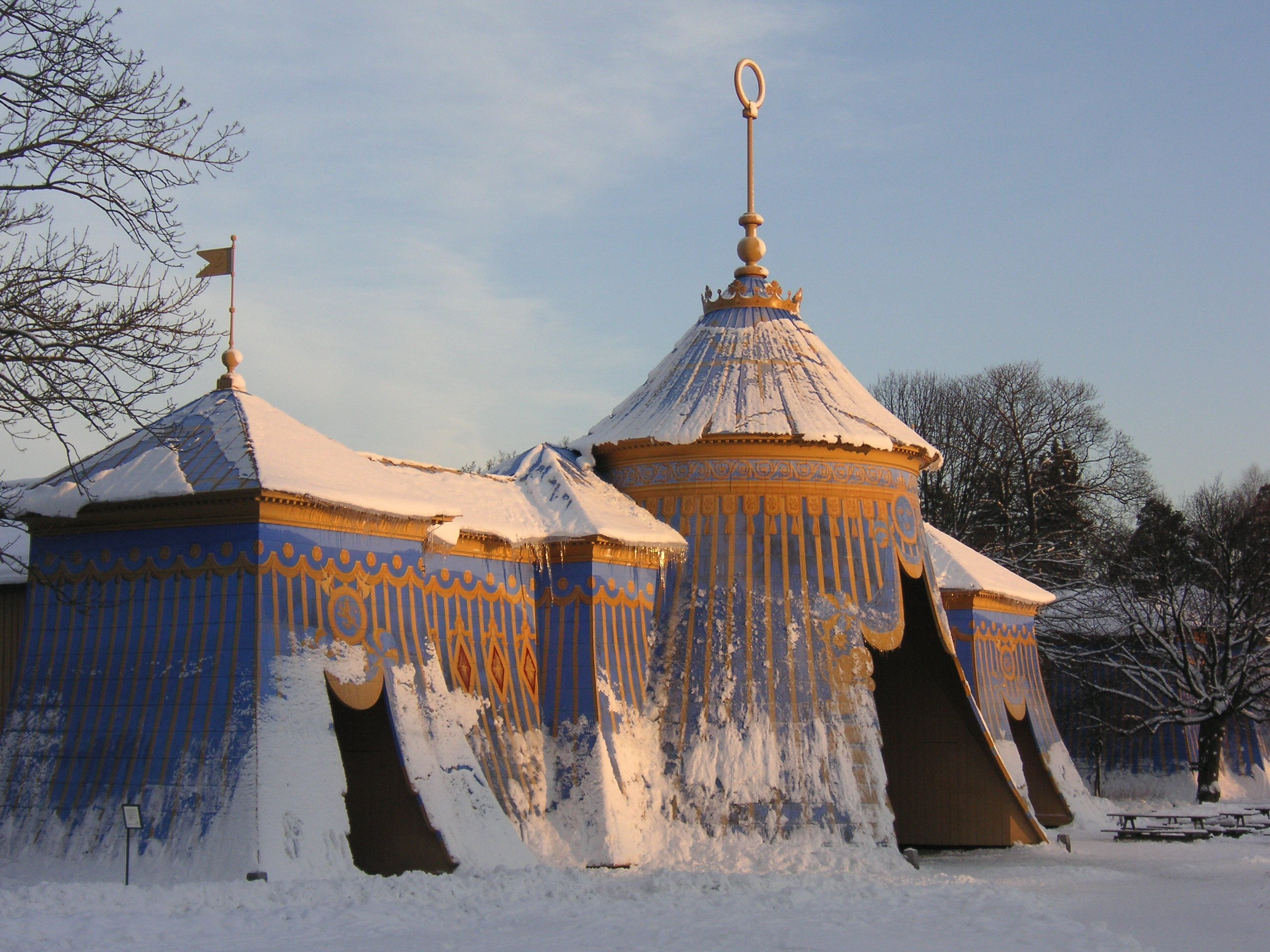
Copper Tent at Haga Park

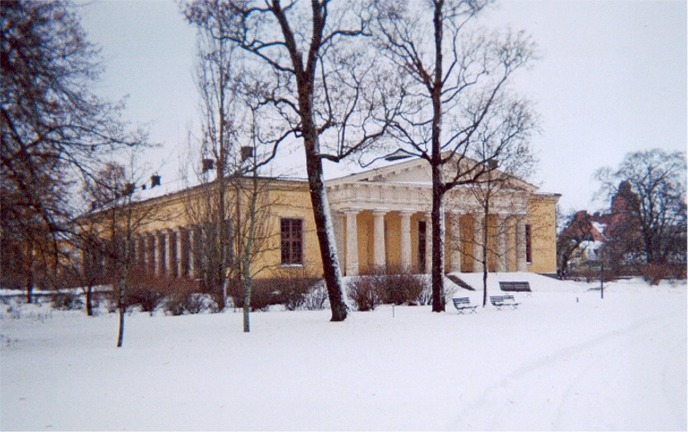
Conservatory in the Botanical Garden, Uppsala

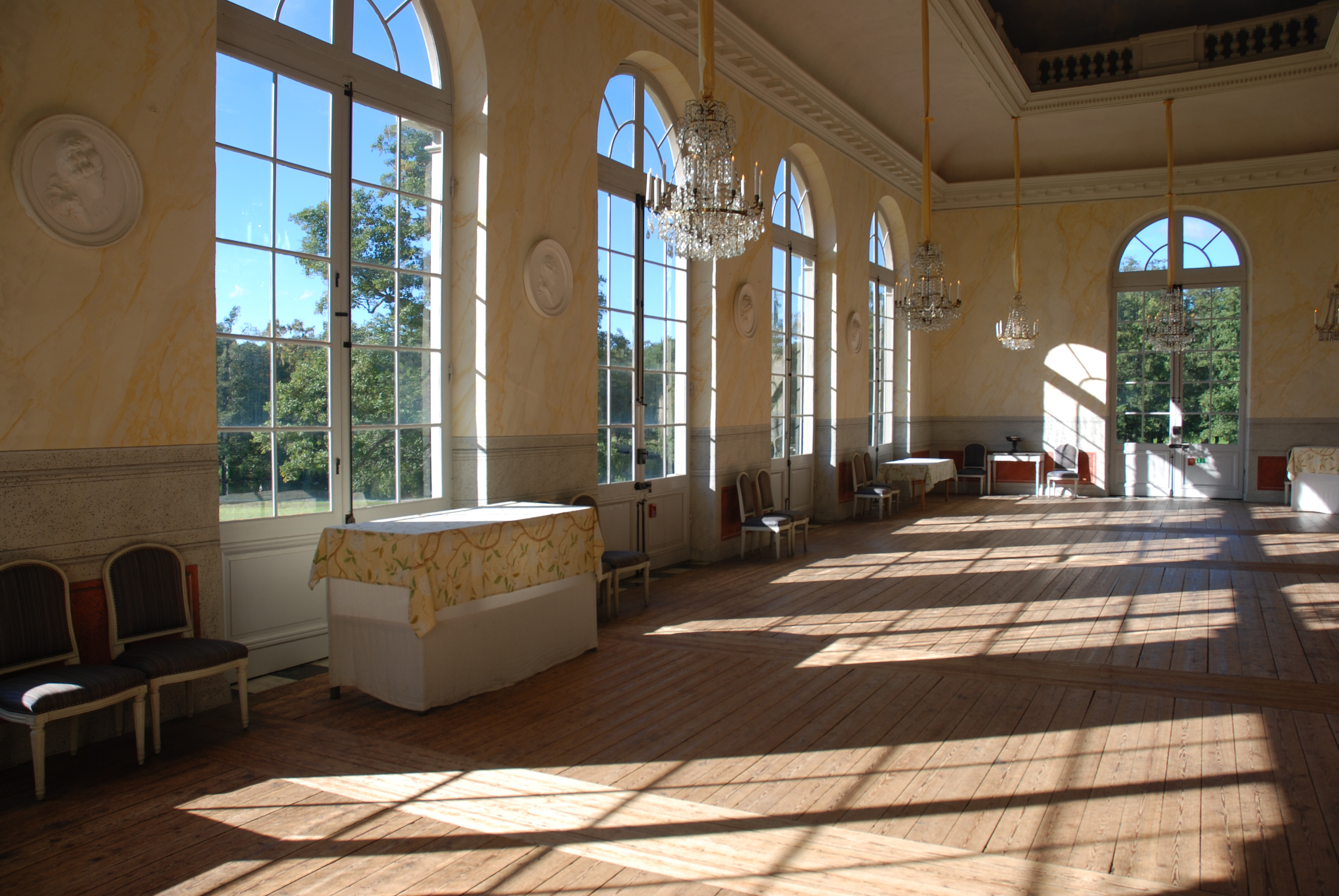
Déjeuner Salon at Drottningholm Castle Theater

== See also ==
- Obelisk at Slottsbacken

== Sources ==
- Nordisk familjebok
- Richard Godfrey Louis-Jean Desprez (Print Quarterly Vol. 3, No. 3, September 1986, pp. 238–240
