= Haga Palace Ruins =

Uncompleted palace in Stockholm, Sweden

Coordinates: 59°21′52″N 18°02′09″E

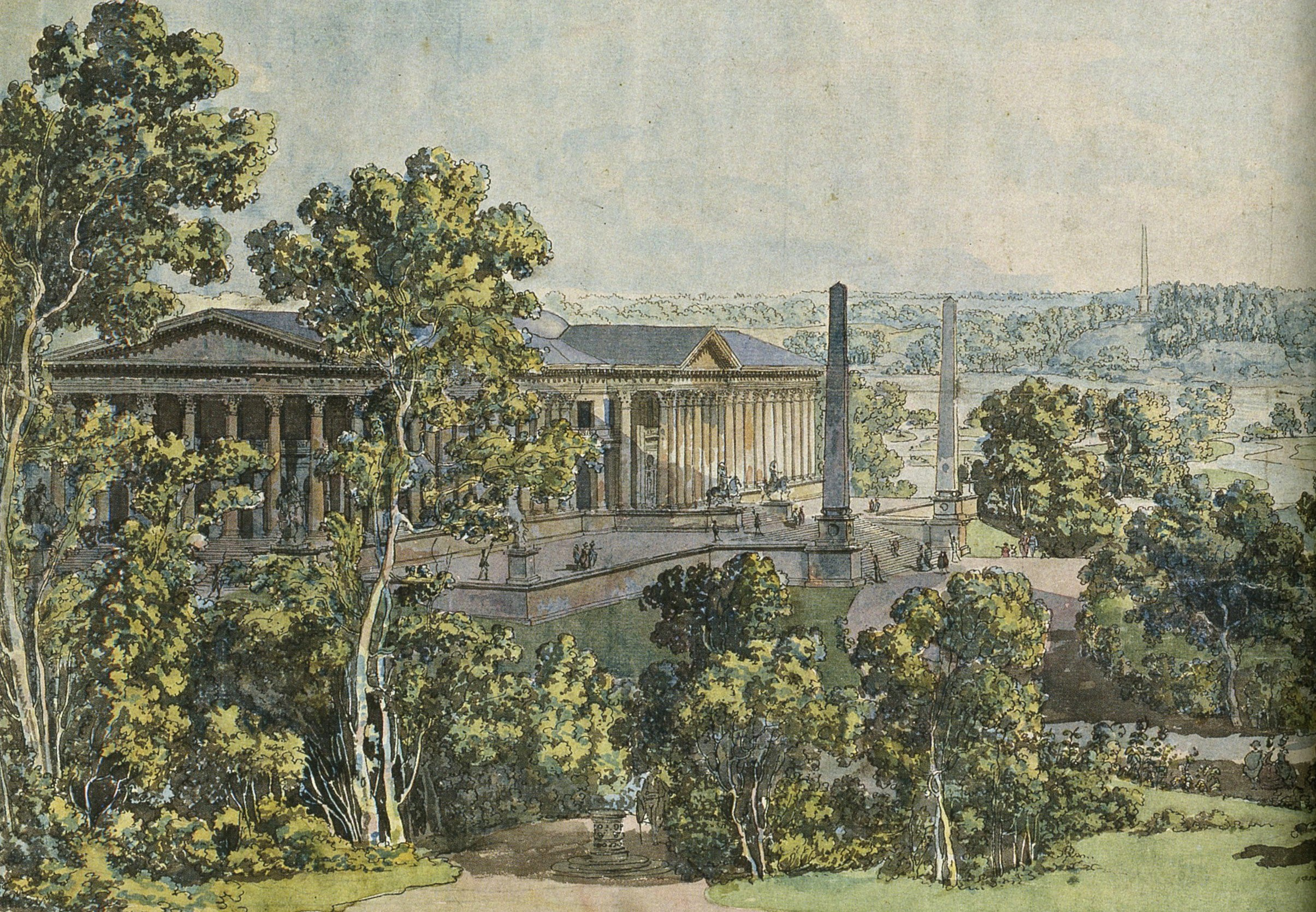
Gustav III's dream: the Haga Great Palace, sketch by Desprez, 1791

The Haga Palace Ruins (Swedish: Haga slottsgrund or Swedish: Stora Haga slottsruin) are the remnants of King Gustav III's ambitious vision for a grand and opulent palace in Hagaparken (Haga Park). Known as the Haga Great Palace (Swedish: Haga slottsgrund), the ruins are located in Solna Municipality, just north of Stockholm, Sweden.

Construction began in 1786 with the laying of the foundation stone. The project, involving no fewer than six architects, was designed to create a magnificent palace where the king could retreat for leisure and display his prized collection of antique Roman statues. The palace was also intended to house an extensive gallery celebrating art and nature. However, the construction came to an abrupt halt in 1792, following the Assassination of Gustav III, leaving the palace incomplete.

Today, the only surviving elements of this grand vision are the cellar foundations, partially concealed on a hill in Haga Park. These ruins include imposing stone walls and archways, evoking a sense of what might have been. The site, long a hidden gem, has become a favoured spot for locals who climb the central column or gather around small fires, surrounded by the thick, weathered stone walls.

== History ==
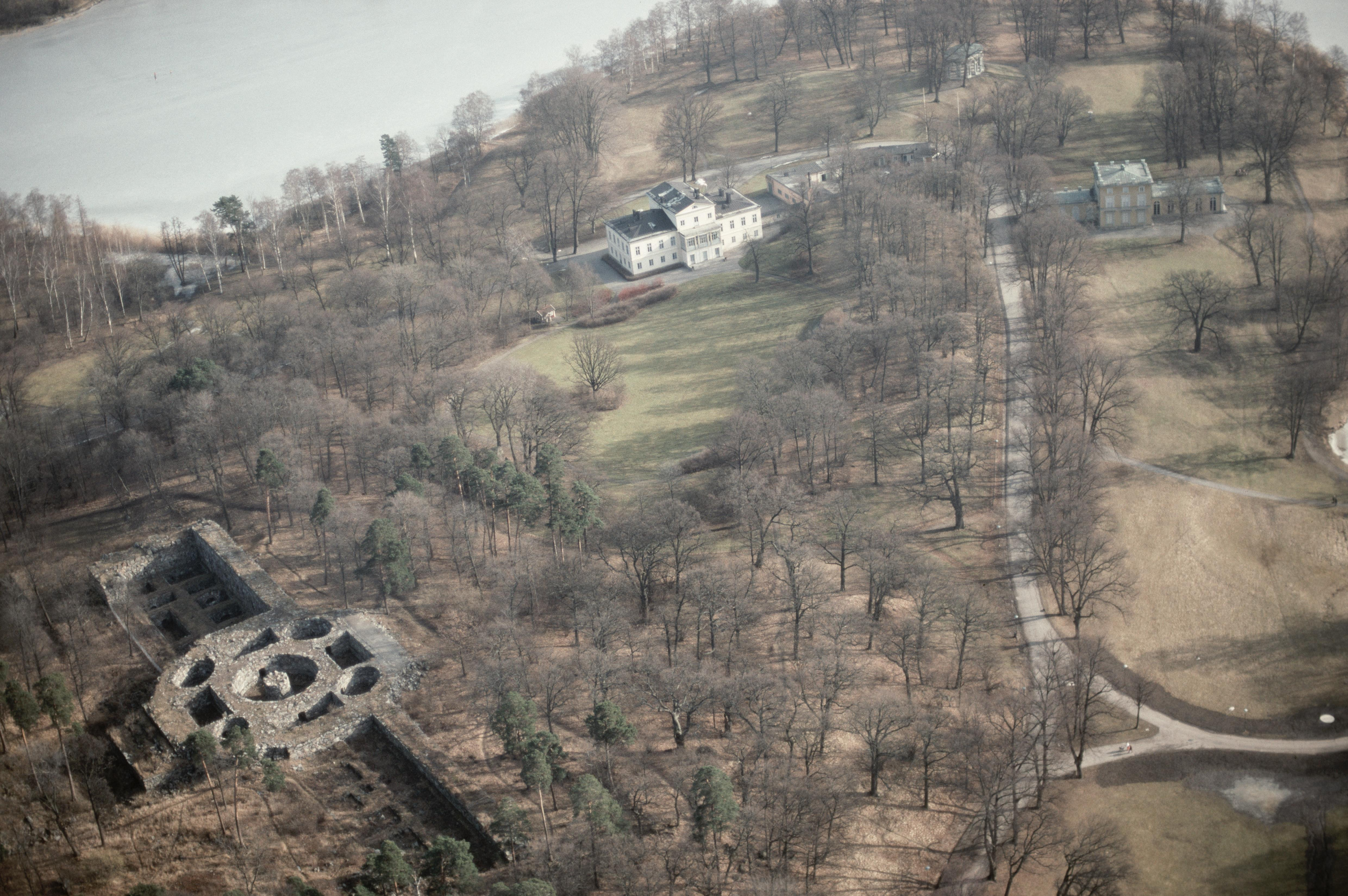
Aerial view of Haga Park, from left to right: the Haga Palace ruins, the current Haga Palace and Gustav III's Pavilion

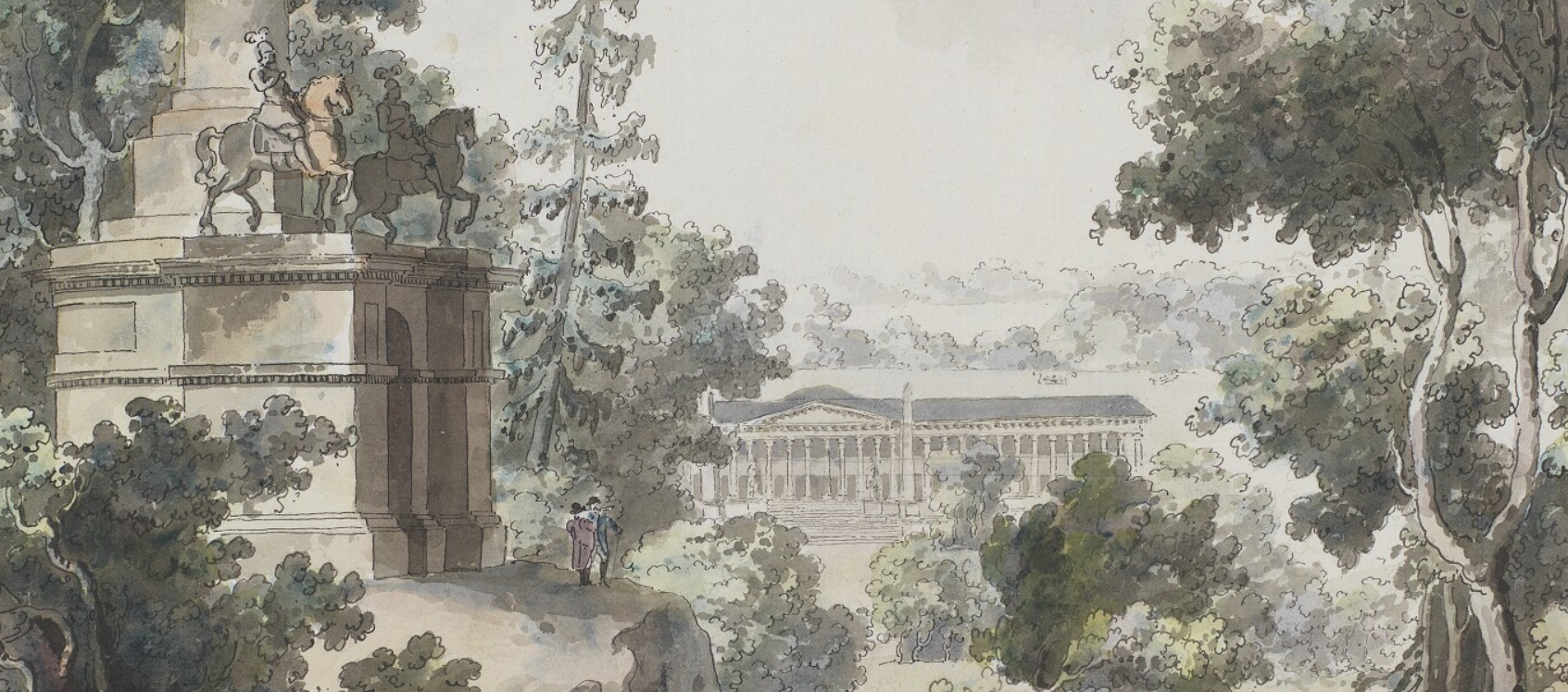
The Haga Great Palace seen from a distance

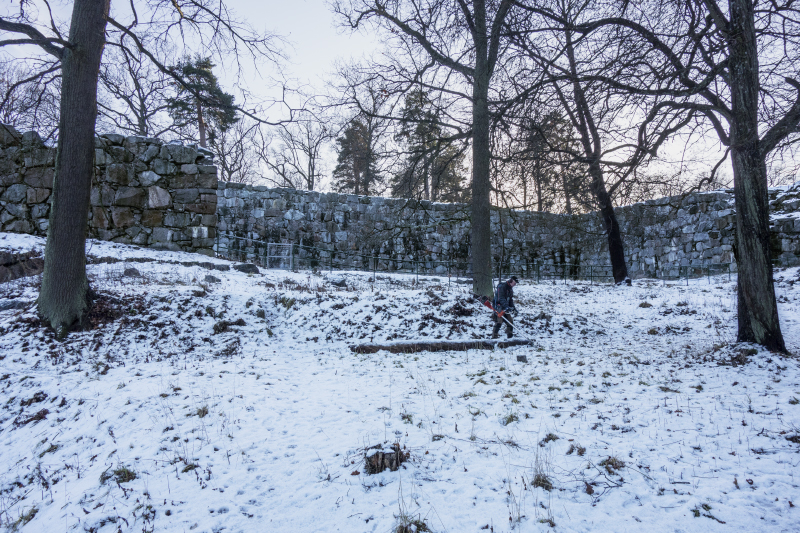
The Haga Palace ruins in winter

=== The First Plans and Designs for a palace at Haga ===
In 1771, king Gustav III acquired the old Haga farm. He started to develop here an English landscape garden, the Haga Park. It was doubled in size in 1785, when he purchased an adjoining farm as well.

The first proposals for a palace at Haga were made at the end of 1770s, first by Gustav III himself and later when Carl Fredrik Adelcrantz made a proposal for a small palace, somewhat modest compared to the later designs. Adelcrantz most likely used Nicodemus Tessin the Younger's proposal for the Apollo Temple at Versailles as a model. The French-inspired style and the caution that characterized contemporary Swedish Rococo drew heavily on Late Baroque features.

Gustav III asked Fredrik Magnus Piper, the royal architect and park architect, to make another design for a smaller pleasure palace on the site of Haga farm. The proposal was included in Piper's master plan presented in 1781 and had, in its basic design, the same form as Adelcrantz's proposal. The king provided clear instructions in the form of his own sketches. The building, referred to as The Casino, had distinct features of Marie Antoinette's Petit Trianon, a pleasure palace to the northwest of Palace of Versailles. In 1783, Piper sent several revised plans to the king, who was on a trip to Italy. However, the king did not like Piper's various proposals and relieved him of the task. After Piper, Gustav III hired the French architect Léon Dufourny, but he took too long to complete his work, and Piper was asked to submit another proposal.

In November 1785, the king bought the Brahelund area, which significantly increased the park's size to the north. Piper's second palace proposal was rejected in 1786 (as compensation, he was asked to design the Turkish Kiosk). Instead, the city architect Erik Palmstedt was consulted for the royal building in the newly purchased Brahelund area. However, the king changed his mind once again regarding the choice of architect, and finally, Olof Tempelman was given the task. His proposal bore clear features of Villa Rotonda in Vicenza as well as St. Peter's Basilica and Pantheon in Rome.

The Haga Great Palace project, with its evolving designs from a modest country house to a large palace and changing architects, not only reflects Gustav III's shifting architectural ideals but also underscores its role as a deliberate political statement, that would take increasingly monumental forms.

==== Gallery: The first designs ====
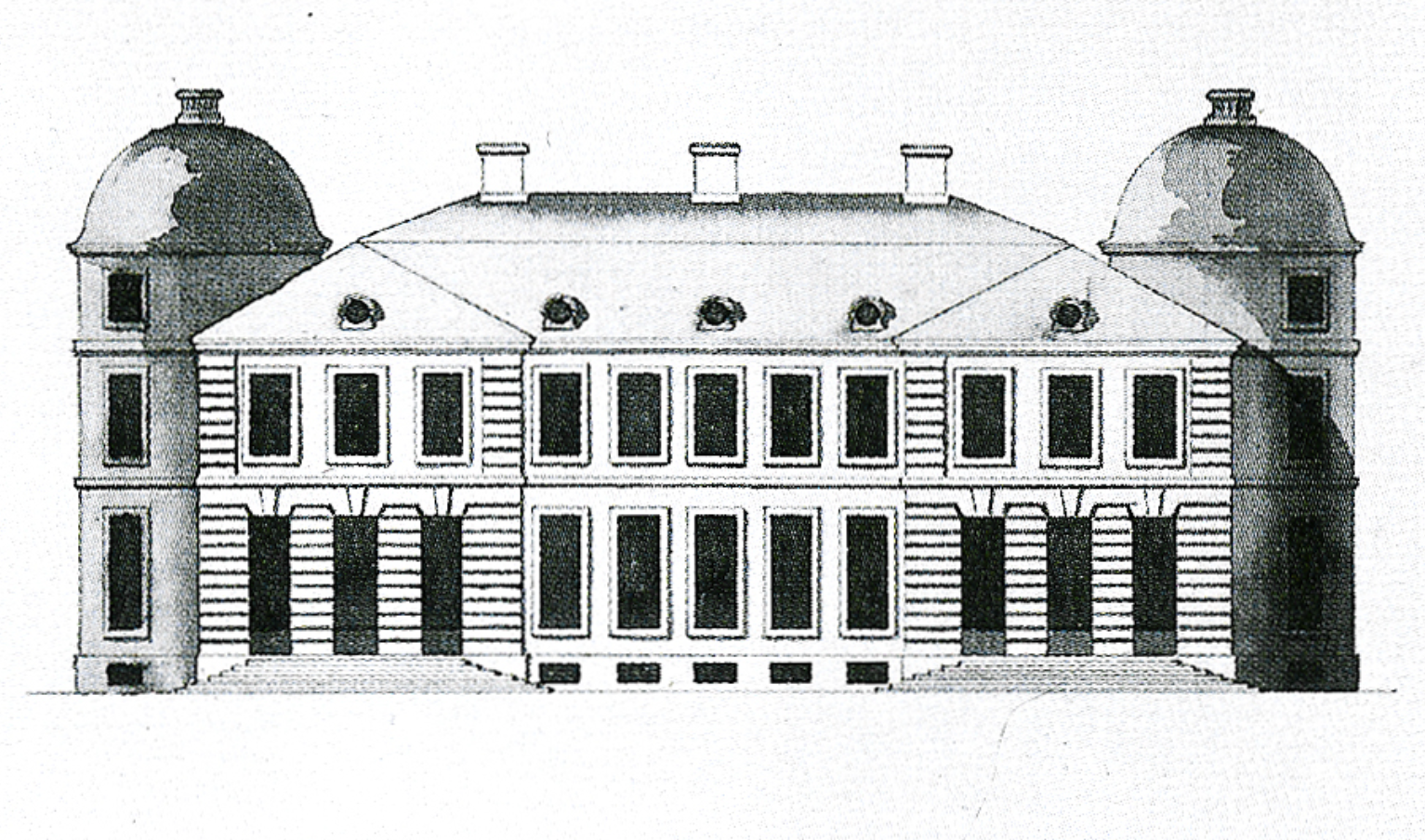
The first design for a palace, inspired by Swedish renaissance and baroque castles

The design proposal made by Carl Frederik Adelcrantz

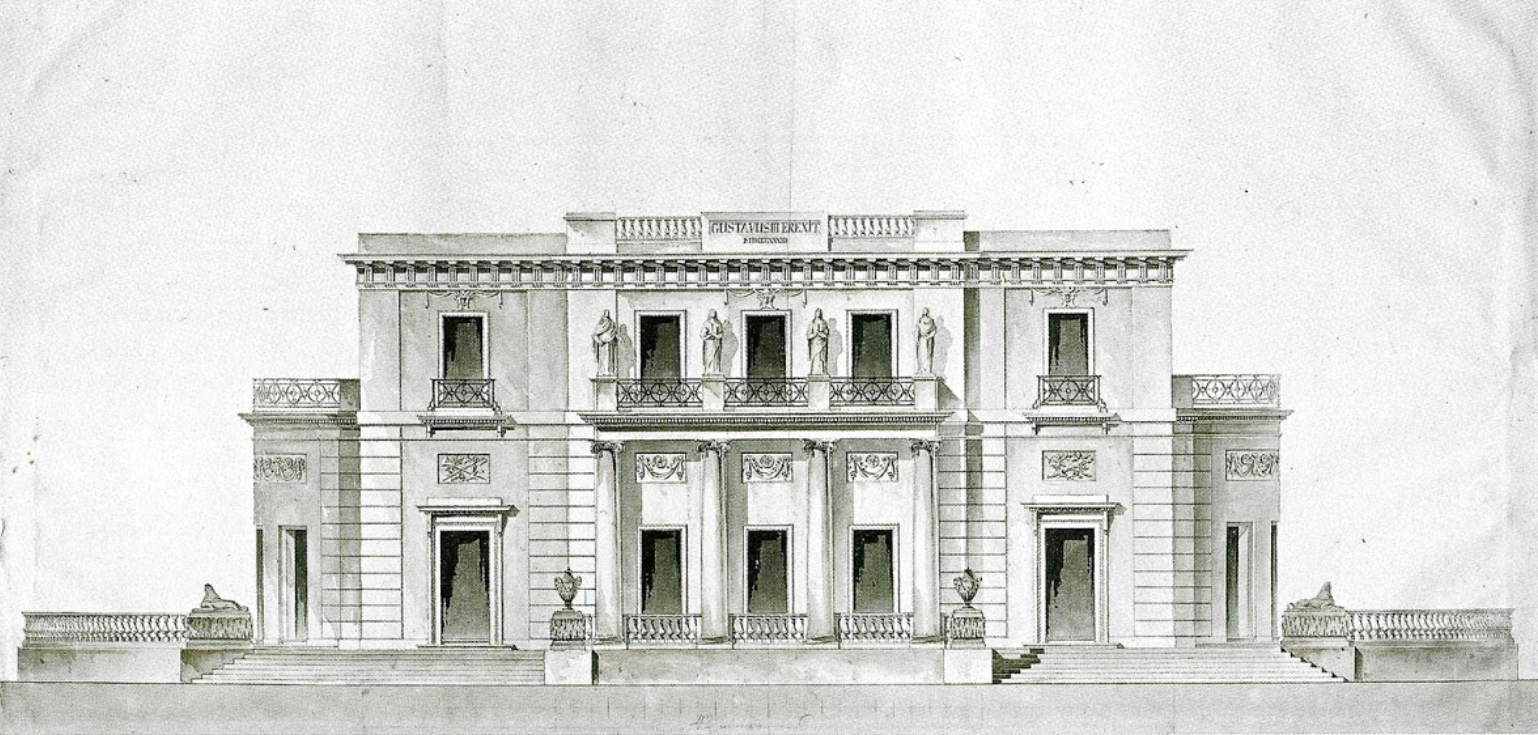
The Casino proposed by Fredrik Magnus Piper

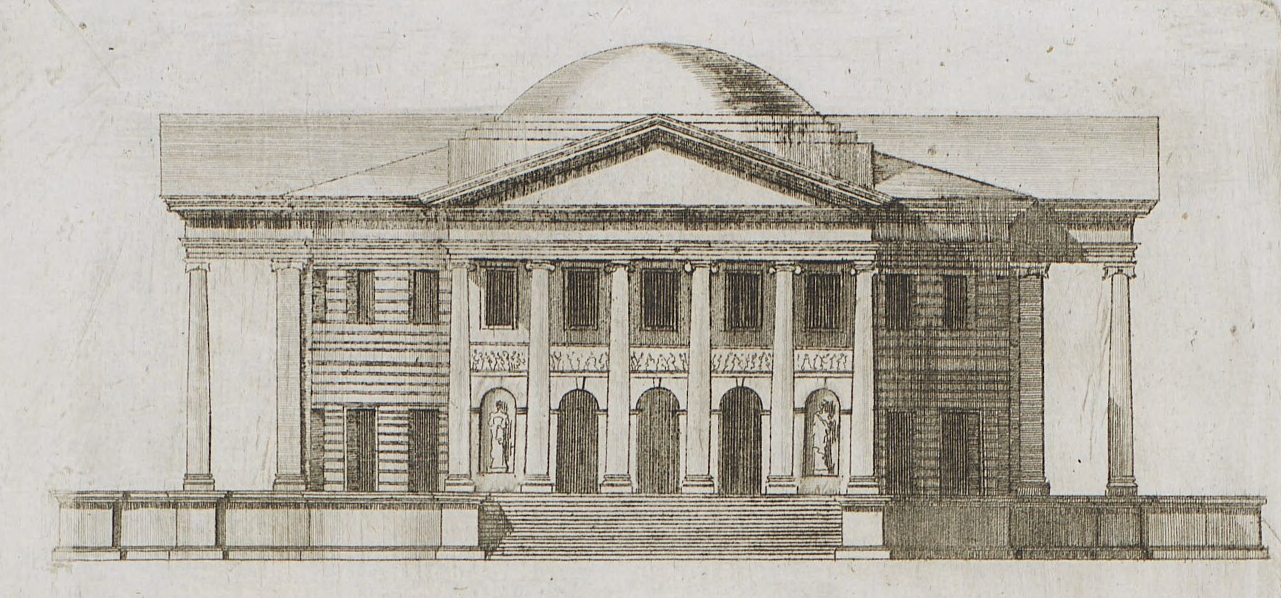
Design by Olof Tempelman inspired by the Villa Rotunda

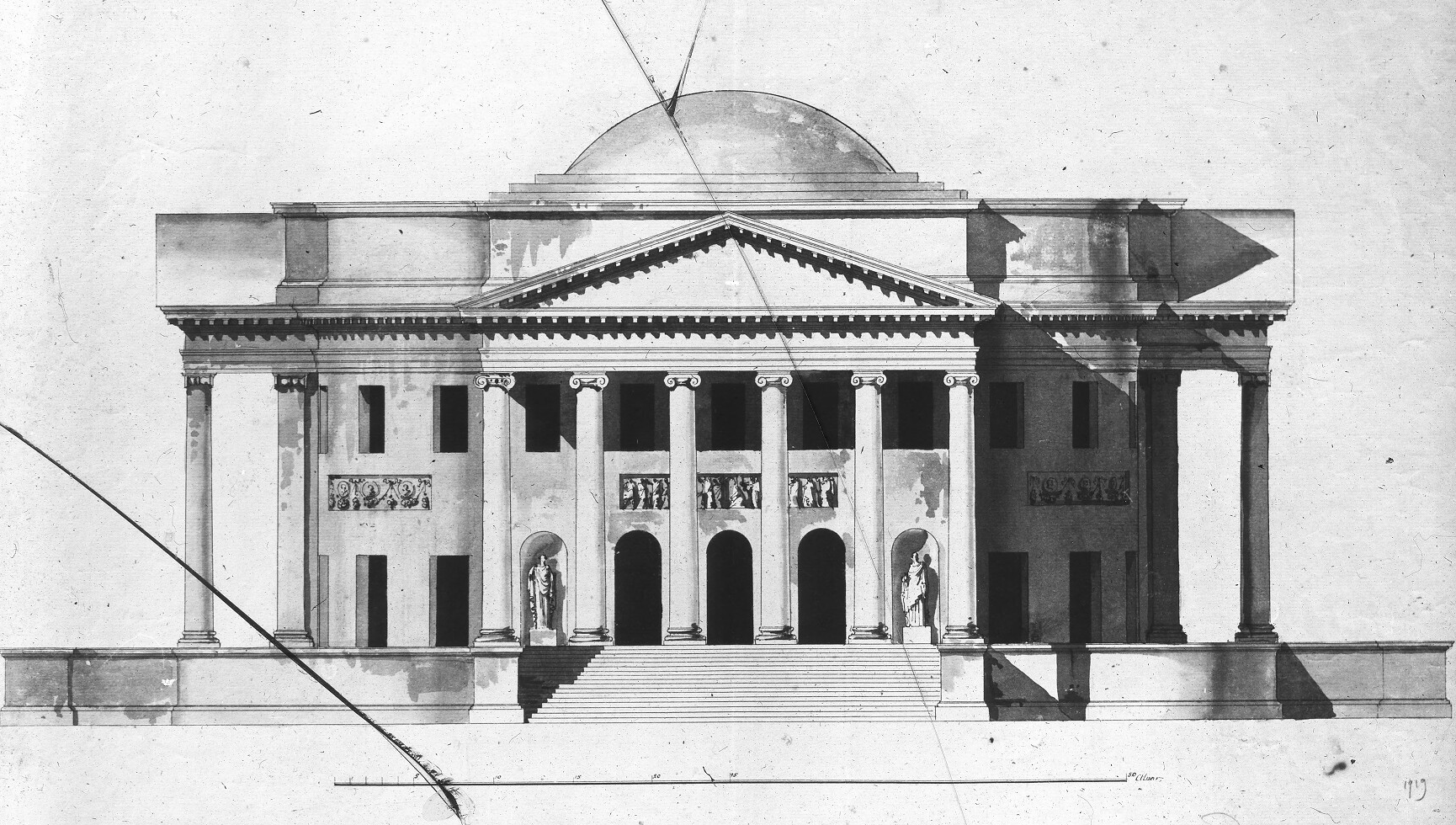
A redesign of Tempelman's proposal by Desprez

=== Start of the Construction: the Foundation ===
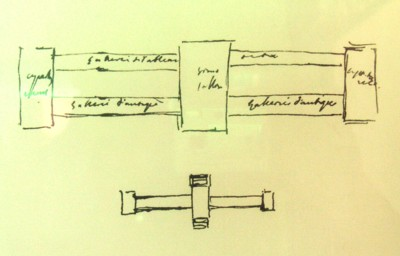
Gustav III's sketch for a design

After the foundation stone ceremony, with music and poetry by Carl Michael Bellman on 19 August 1786, Hedvig Elisabeth Charlotte of Holstein-Gottorp, who was present at the ceremony, wrote in her diary:

While this [Gustav III] laid the first stone, in which, according to custom, several coins were placed; on it was also engraved a Latin inscription declaring that it was in memory of the king on this day returning freedom to his people, laying the foundation for this new castle, a home for freedom, pleasure, and joy.

The foundation stone was likely placed under the central pillar of the foundation, which was intended to be the central domed room of the castle. The foundation documents from Gustav III are preserved. The second part of the text reads:

At this pleasant location, where Gustav III 14 years ago intended to lay the foundation for the public welfare, and from where, on this day, he just began to restore his fatherland, he now with his own hand laid the foundation stone for this building. 19th Aug. 1786.

Immediately after this, extensive work began on the foundation and basement of the castle, based on designs by Olof Tempelman. Only after the project had been underway for some time did Gustav III, who was deeply interested in architecture, personally become involved with the design, adding wings to the sides of the building with long rows of 70 Corinthian columns. The palace was to house an art museum, where the king wanted to display his collection of ancient sculptures and paintings he had brought back from Italy and France. In addition, the palace was to have a theater, banquet halls, and housing for the entire court.

=== Another change in Architect: Louis Jean Desprez ===
Once again, Gustav III began to doubt the architect's proposal, and in 1787, the project was handed over to Louis Jean Desprez. The king had met Desprez in Rome and invited him to Stockholm, where Desprez had been responsible for the decoration of Gustav III's Opera (Swedish: Gustavianska operahuset) since 1774. In Desprez's final facade drawing for the main palace facade, the building's mighty row of columns can be seen. To the south, a monumental free-standing staircase is flanked by two obeliskes. In one version of the design, Desprez replaced the obelisks with two equestrian statues.

The palace has often been said to be planned as the endpoint of a visual axis stretching from Stockholm Palace via Sveavägen, Bellevue Park, and Brunnsviken to Hagaparken, a distance of nearly five kilometers. This is a misconception that was debunked in 1929 by Ragnar Josephson.

By 1790, construction was in full swing, despite an expensive war with Russia at the same time. Work on the "Great Stables" was halted to free up all available resources for the palace construction. Due to the steep terrain, substantial foundation walls were built with quarried stone.

At the beginning of the 1790s, the plans grew further. A fold-out section was added to the already established floor plan. Desprez's drawings showed a grand new staircase to the north, with an open space framed by 18 columns. The plans also included a large forecourt in front of the northern facade of the castle. The model for this was Giulio Romano's Palazzo del Te in Mantua.

At its peak, nearly 800 people worked on the Haga Great Palace project. The workforce consisted of approximately 650 soldiers, supplemented by around 150 Russian prisoners of war who were housed at the finnstugorna. According to contemporary sources, these prisoners "formed a more numerous than valuable reinforcement".

==== Gallery: How would have Desprez's final design looked like? ====
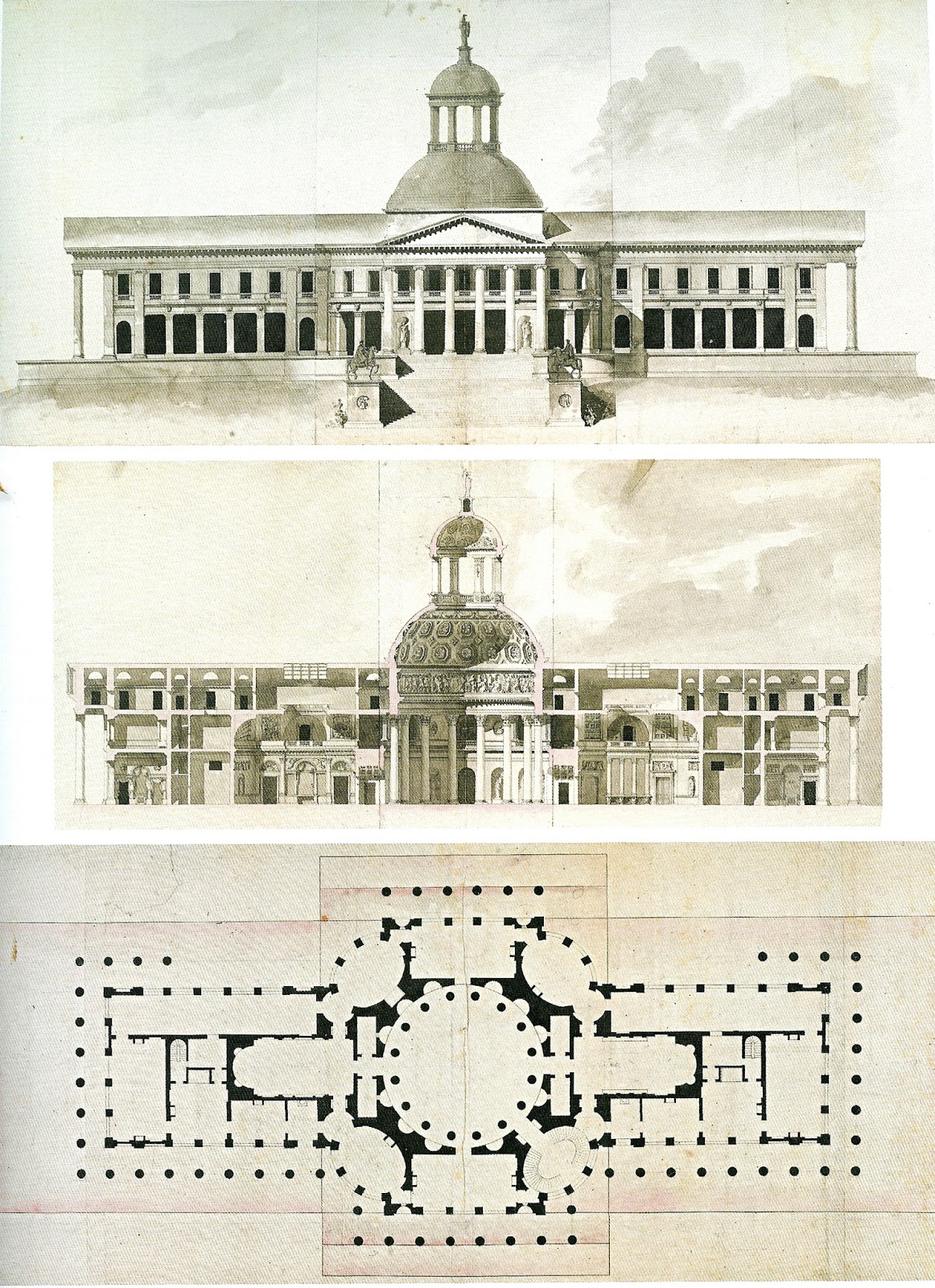
The first monumental design by Desprez, half palace, half museum (1788)

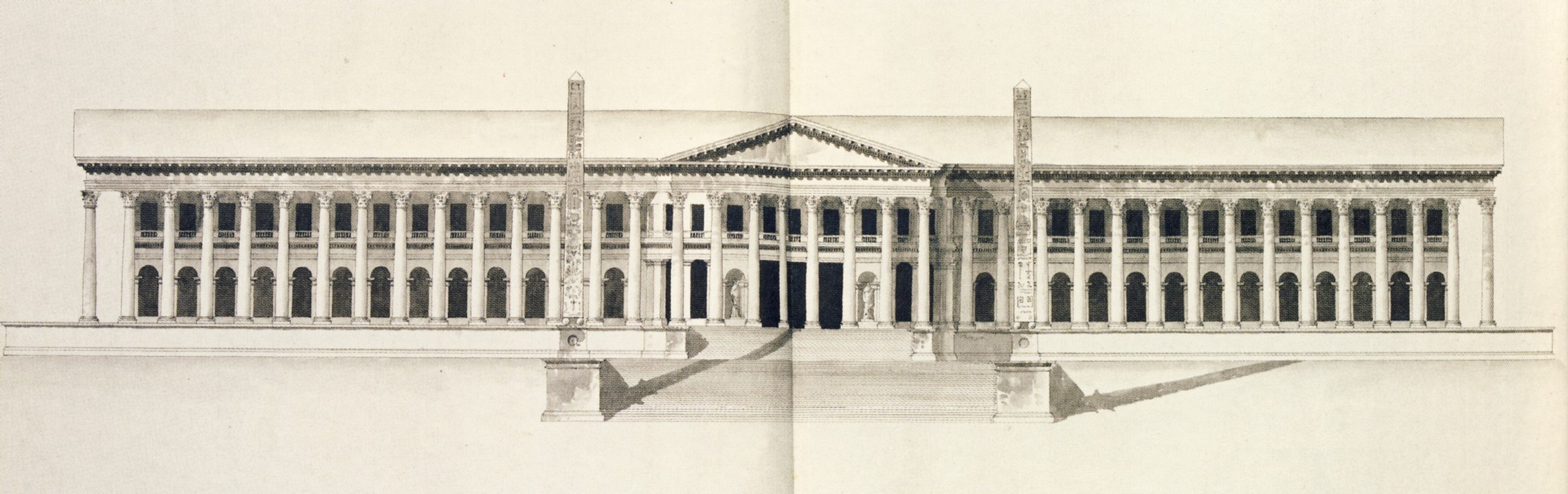
The final design by Desprez (1790)

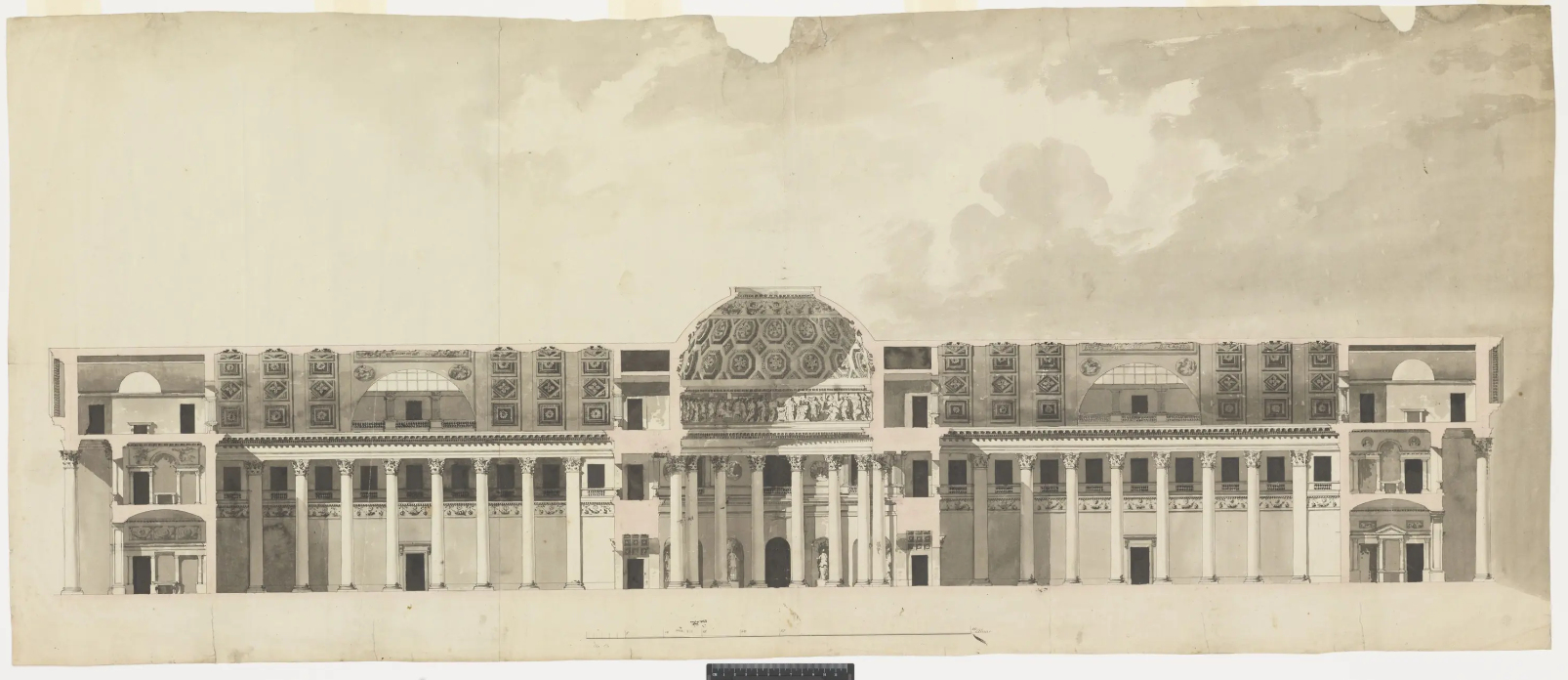
Crossection of the 1790 design, where the building is still aimed to be half museum, half palace

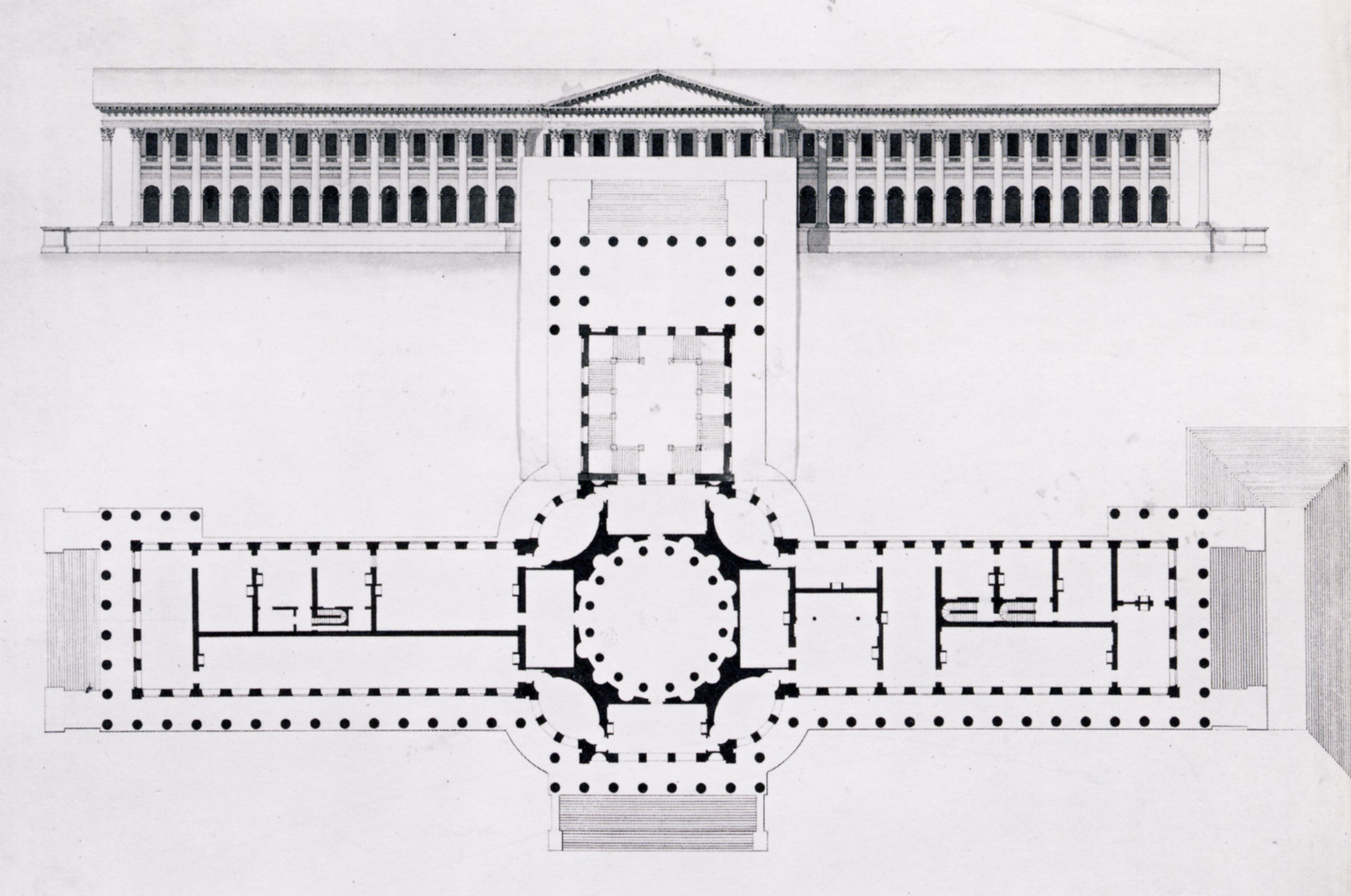
The final plan and design of the palace, less museum and more palace with space for state rooms and royal apartments

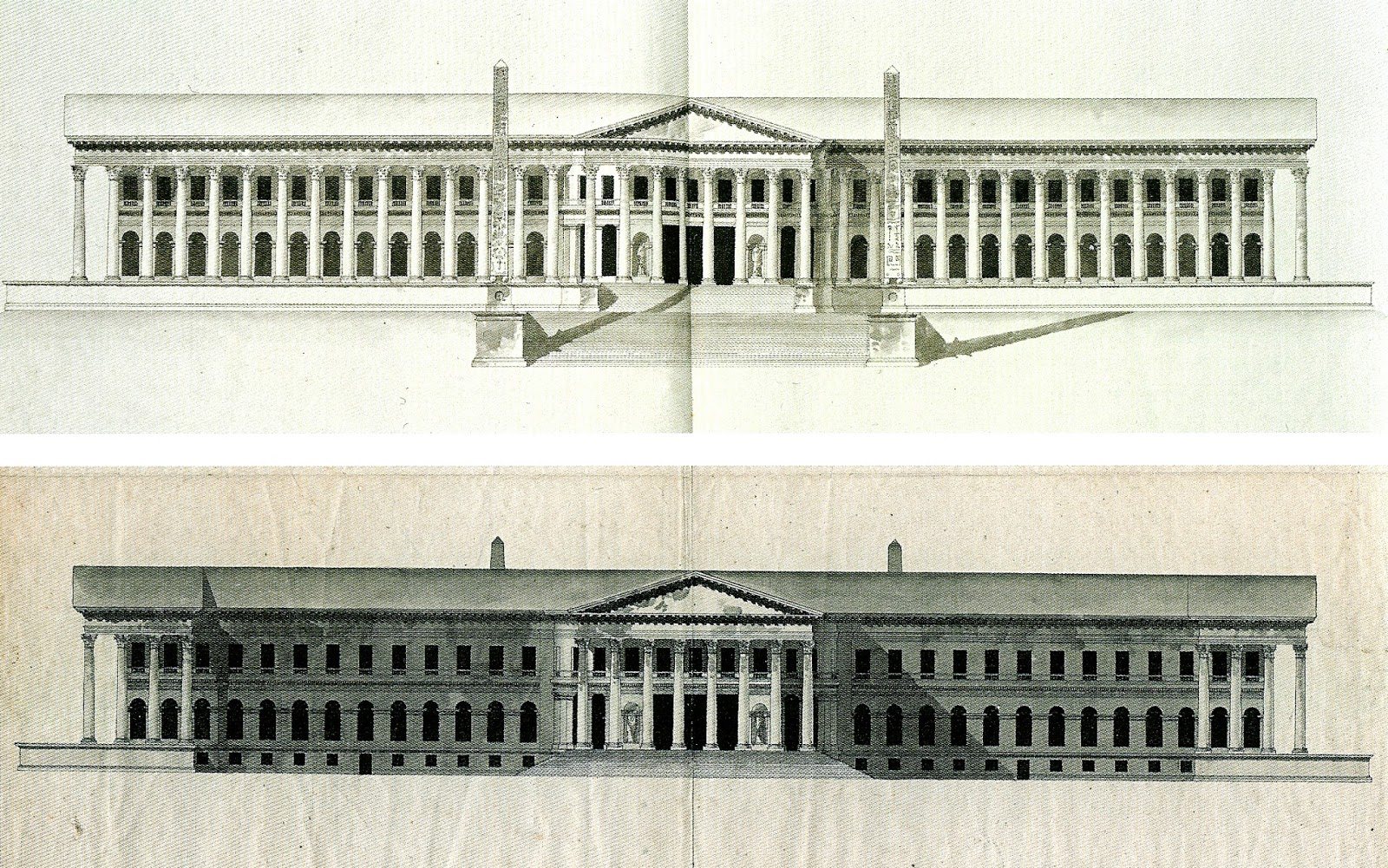
Front and back of the palace

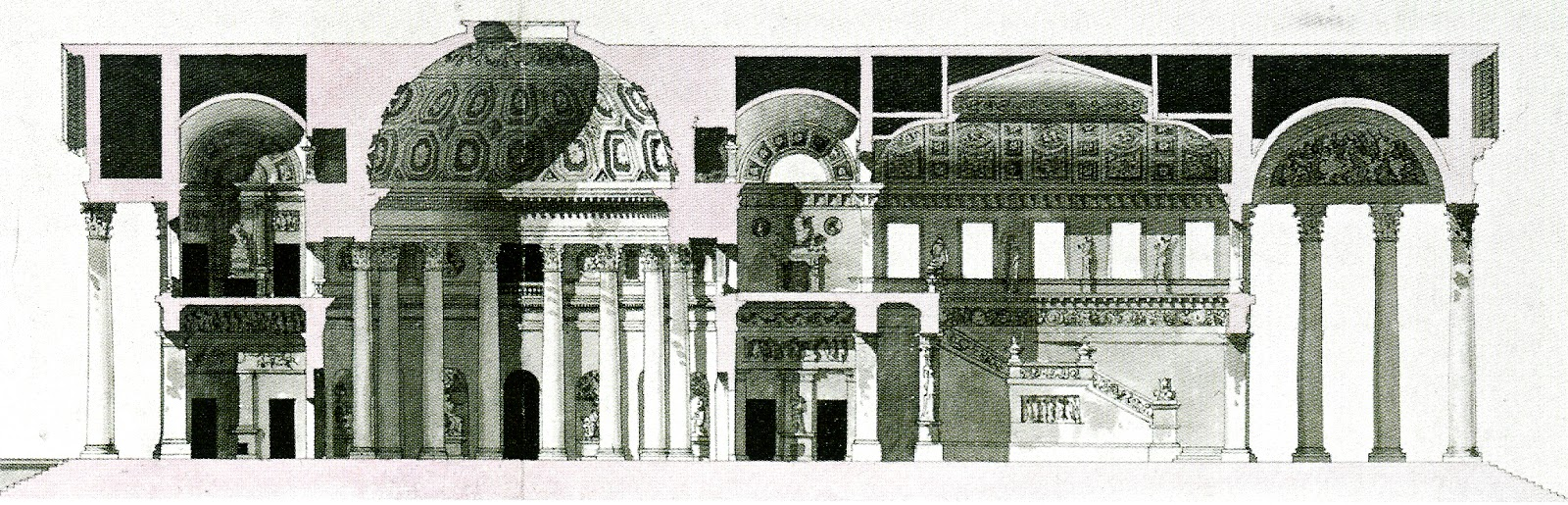
Cross section of the staircase and the main hall of the palace

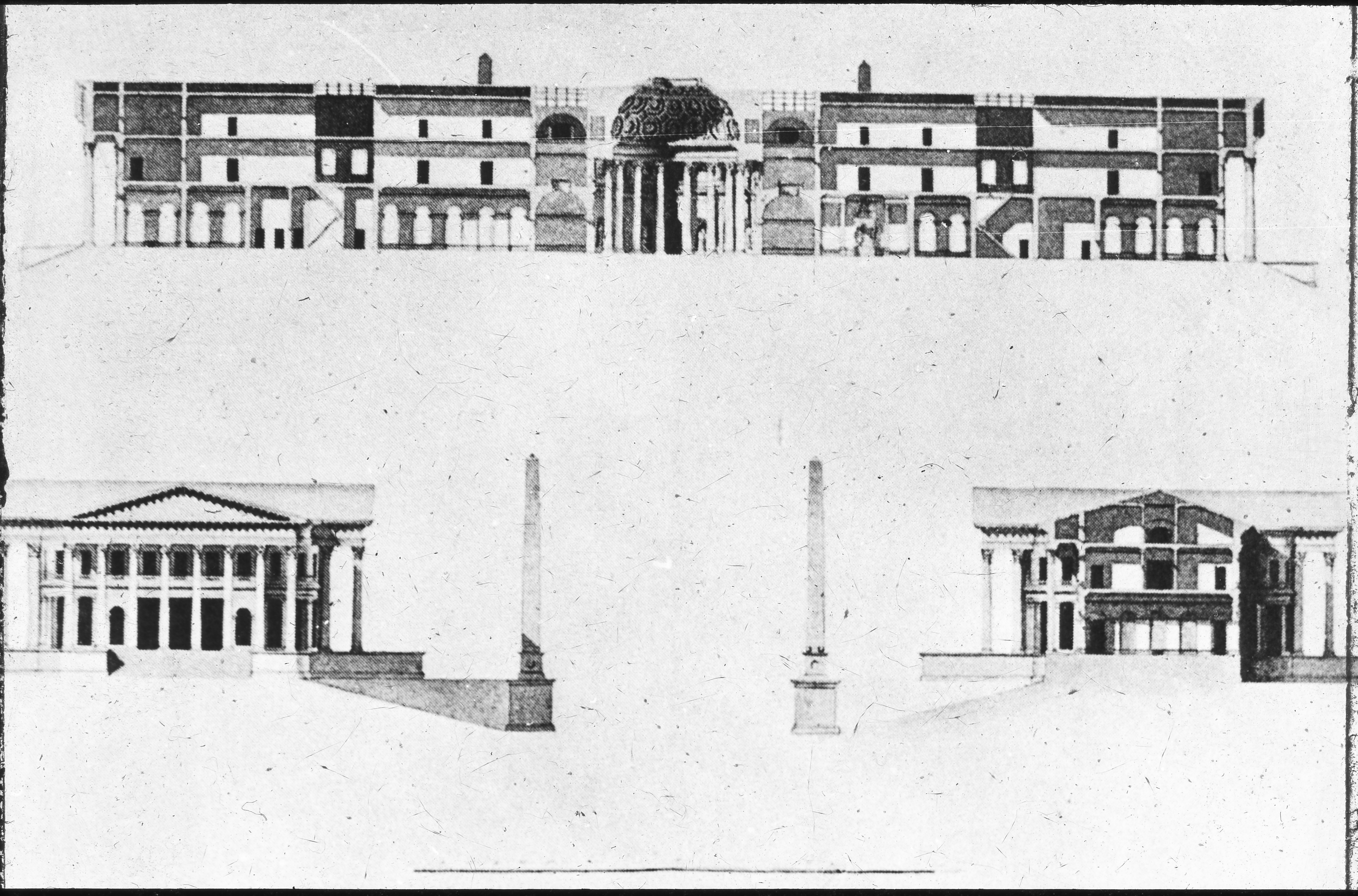
Cross section of the palace and the side facades

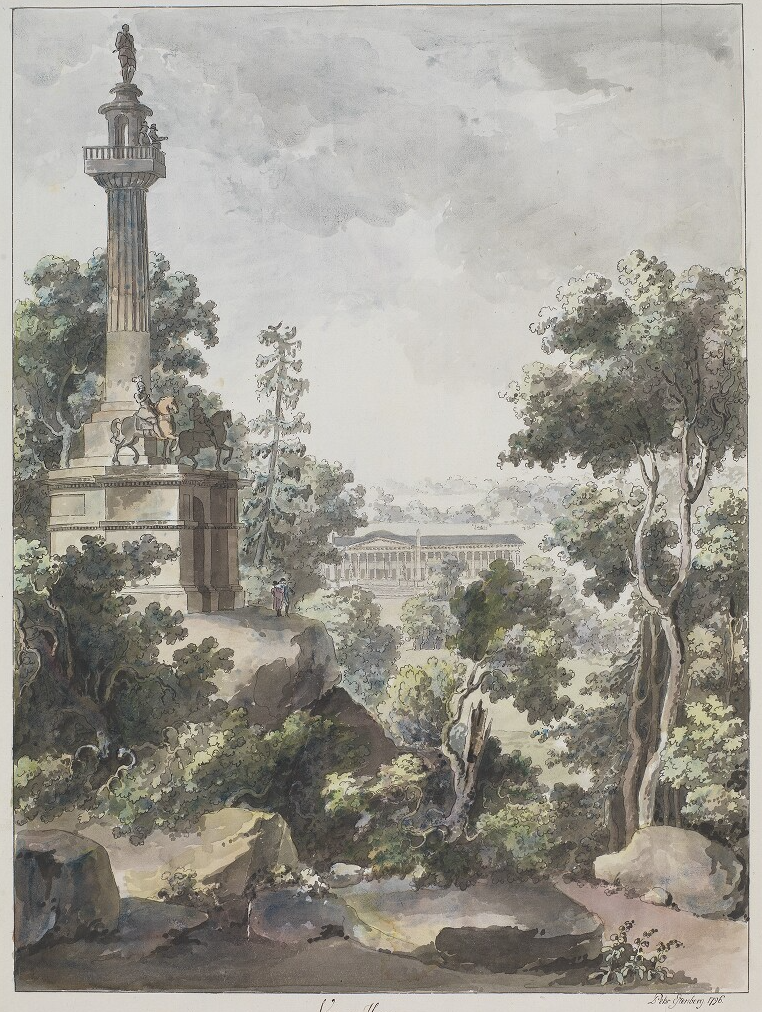
Sketch by Desprez showing the palace from a distance

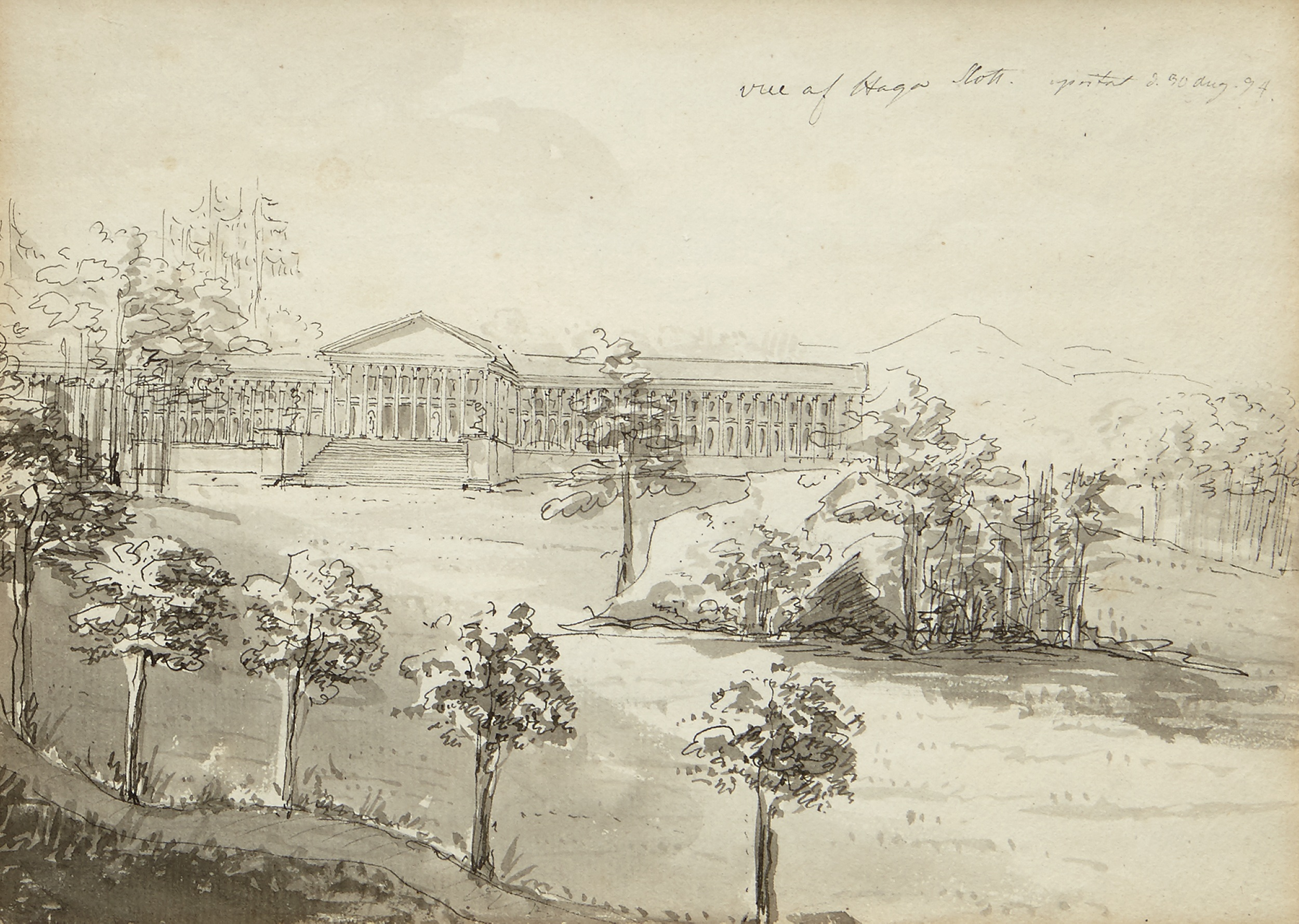
A drawing by Carl Christoffer Gjorwell (30 August 1794)

=== Construction halts ===
Construction of the palace came to a halt following the king's assassination in March 1792, leaving the Haga Great Palace unfinished. The palace foundation was covered with wooden planks, and by the autumn of 1792, the large stockpile of bricks already delivered to the site was repurposed for building the wings of the military academy at Karlberg Palace.

According to Gustav III's estate inventory, there were also large quantities of unused finely hewn stone intended for the building's plinths and moldings, which were likely used in the construction of the Queen's Pavilion (Haga Palace) ten years after the king's death.

== Panorama ==
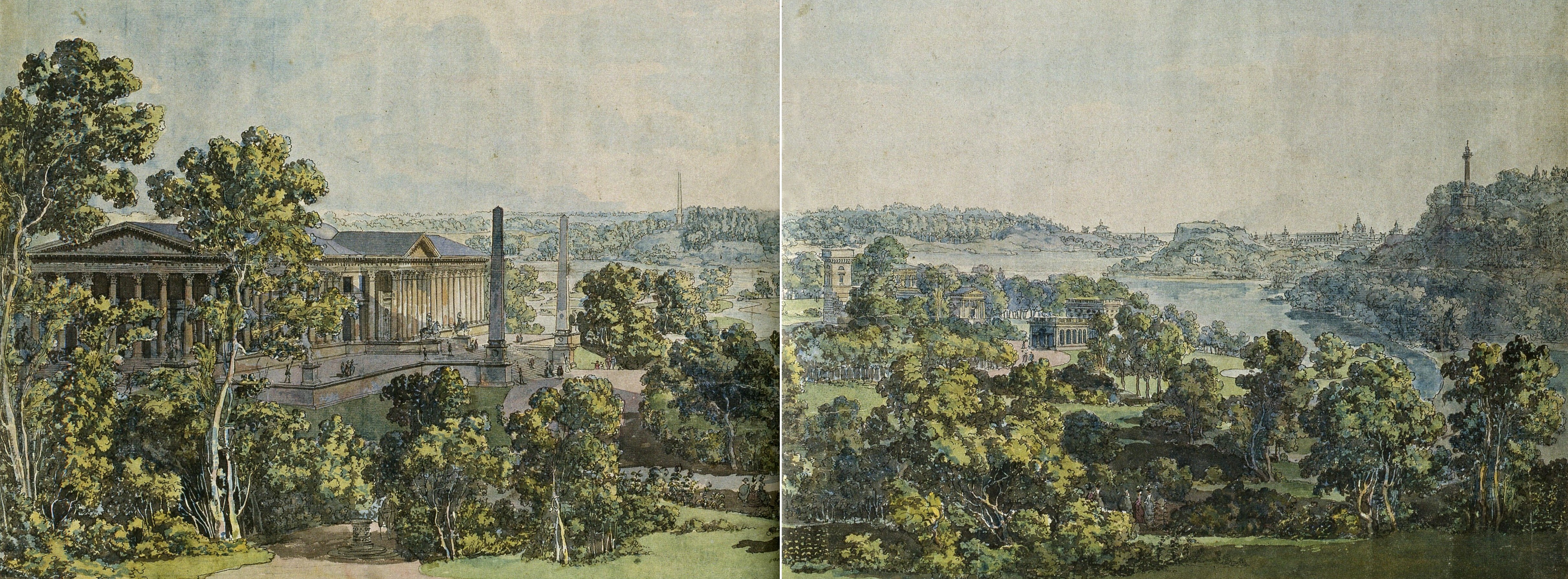
The Great palace and Haga Park how Desprez and Gustav III envisioned it (in the right middle is Gustav's III Pavilion)

== What remains: the Wooden Model and the art collection ==
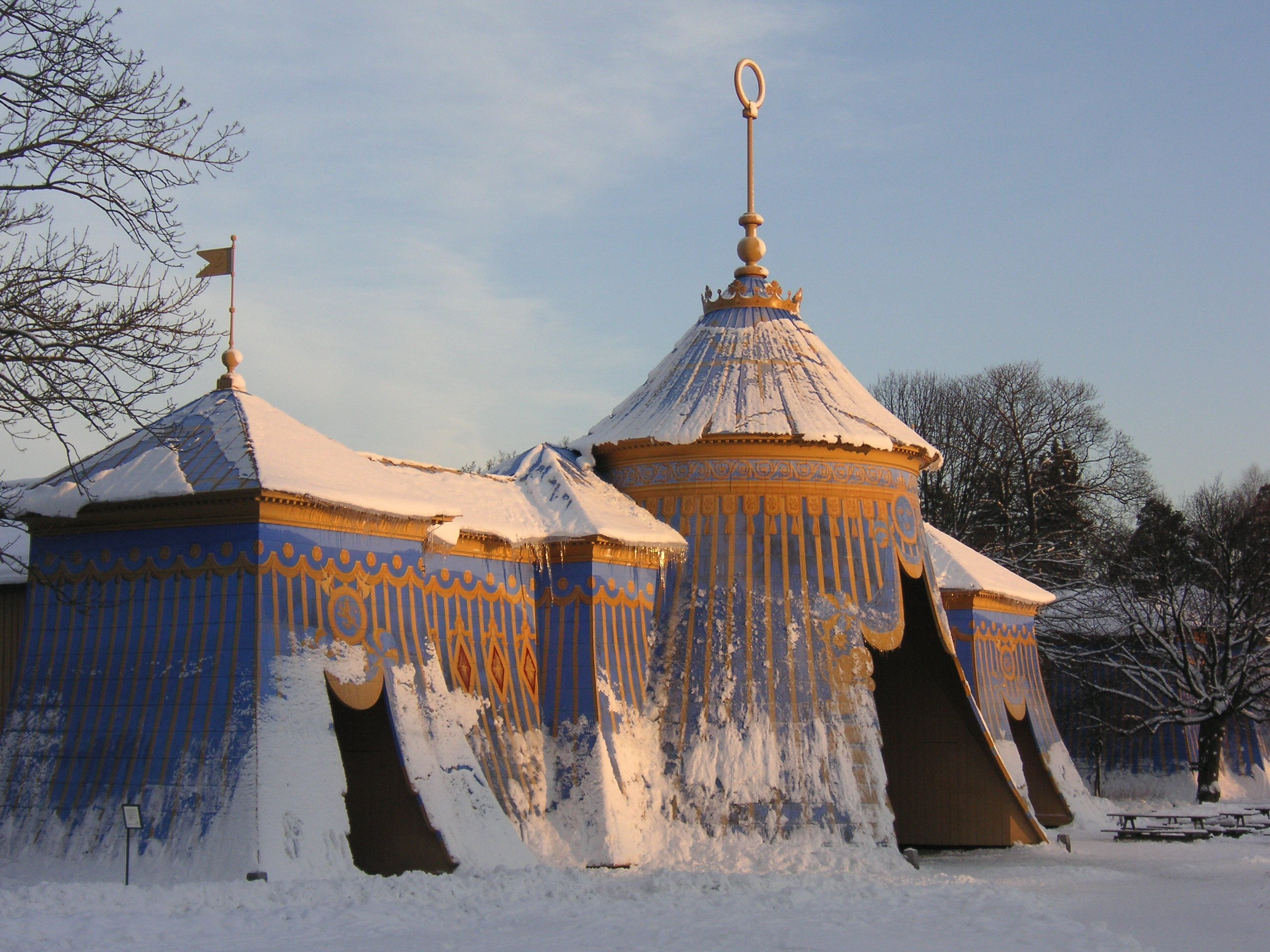
The Copper tents in the Haga Park houses the museum with the wooden model

The only part of the planned palace completed after Gustav III's death was a highly detailed wooden model, along with a few sketches and drawings. The model was completed a few years after Gustav III's death and is now the main attraction in Haga Park Museum, which is located in the central Copper Tents within the park. The model is highly detailed and was considered furniture maker Christopher Borenstrand's masterpiece. Parts of the model can be removed to reveal miniature, precise interior details. Through a peephole on the side of the model and a mirror system, visitors can even look into the palace's dome as envisioned by architect Desprez.

Gustav III's extensive collection of antique art objects, originally intended for Haga Great Palace, was relocated in 1794 to Gustav III's Museum of Antiquities (Swedish: Gustav III:s antikmuseum) in one of the wings of Stockholm Palace. Today, it is Sweden's oldest public art museum and one of the oldest in Europe.

=== Gallery: The Wooden Model and the Art Collection ===
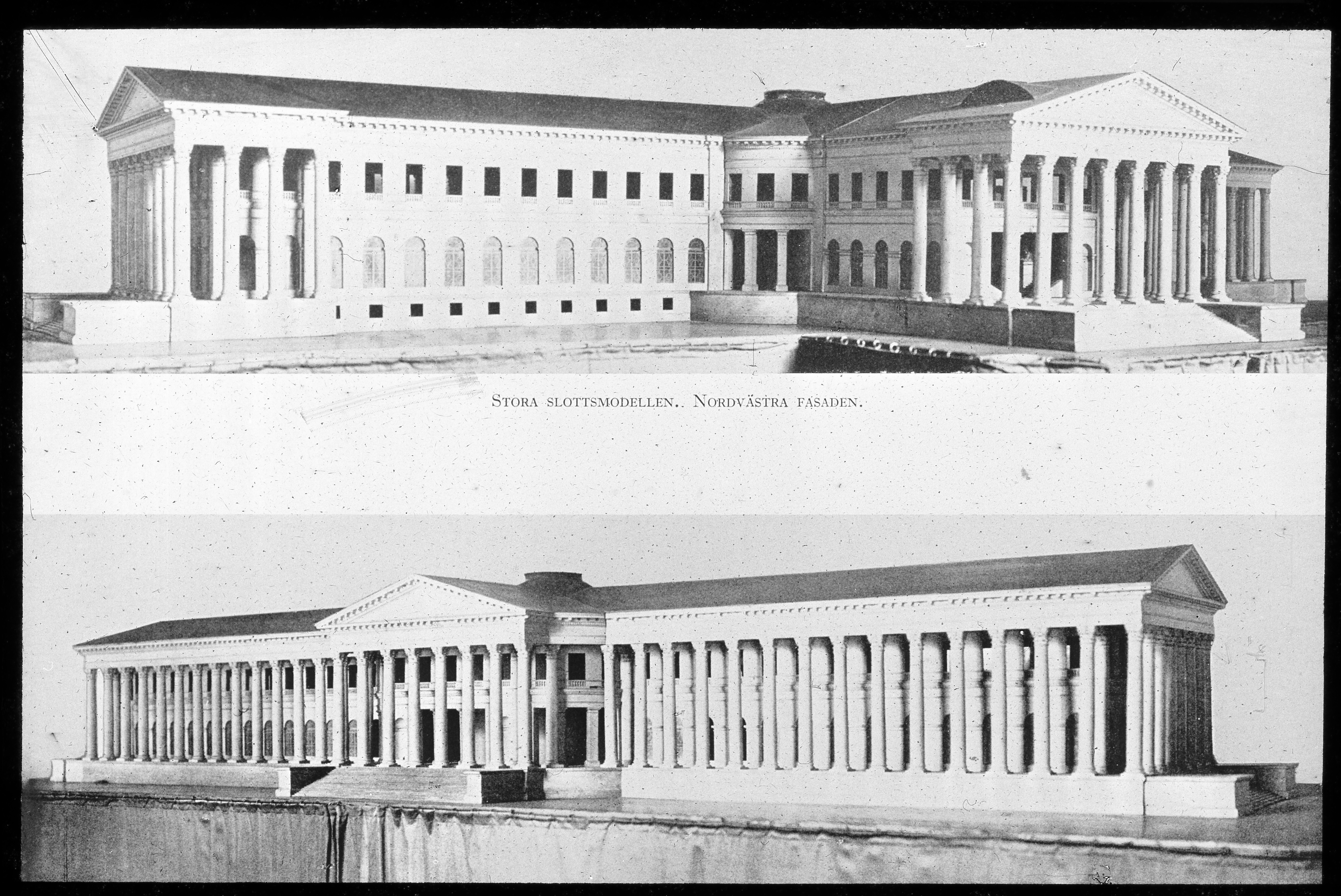
The wooden model

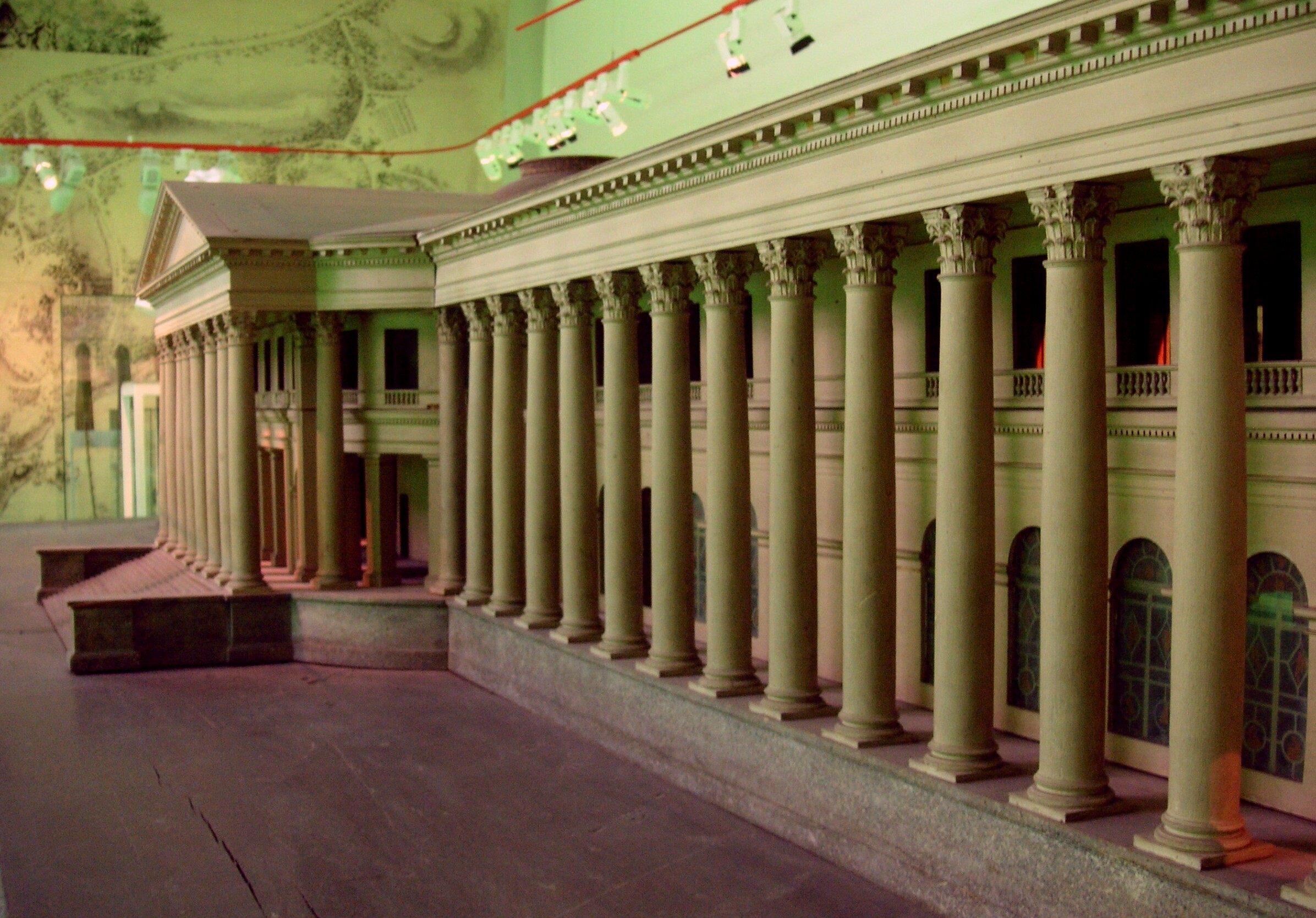
The wooden model

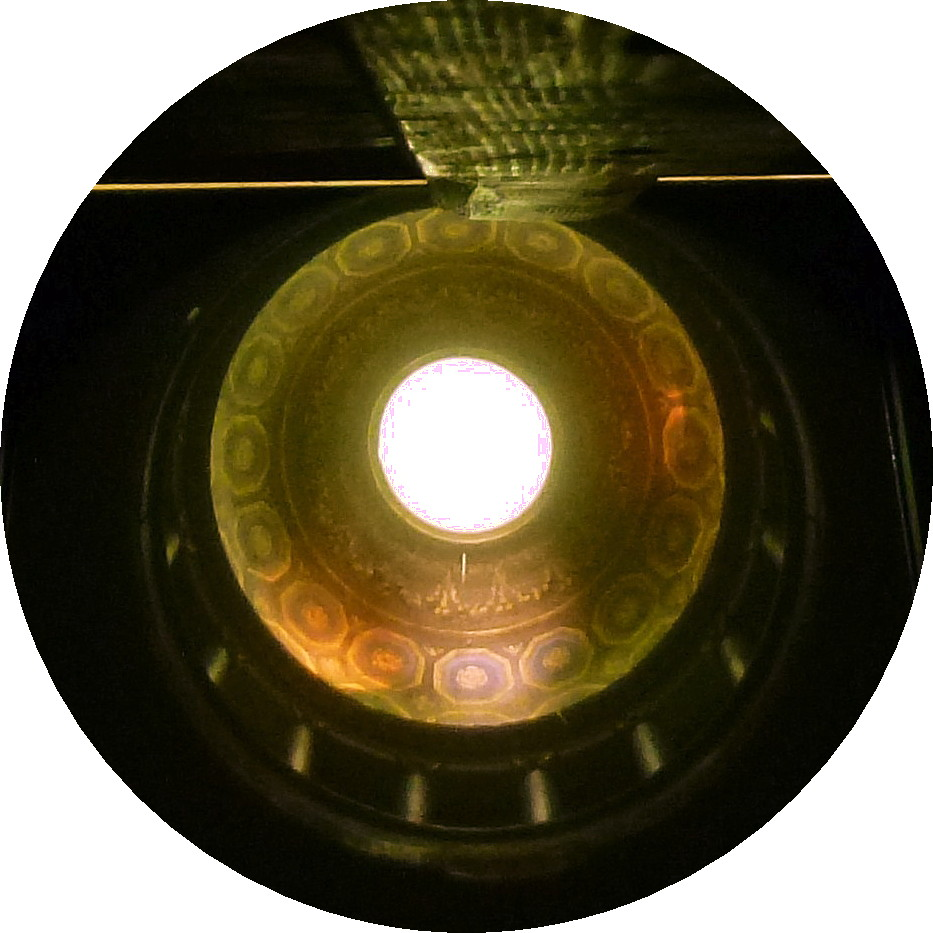
A look into the Cupola

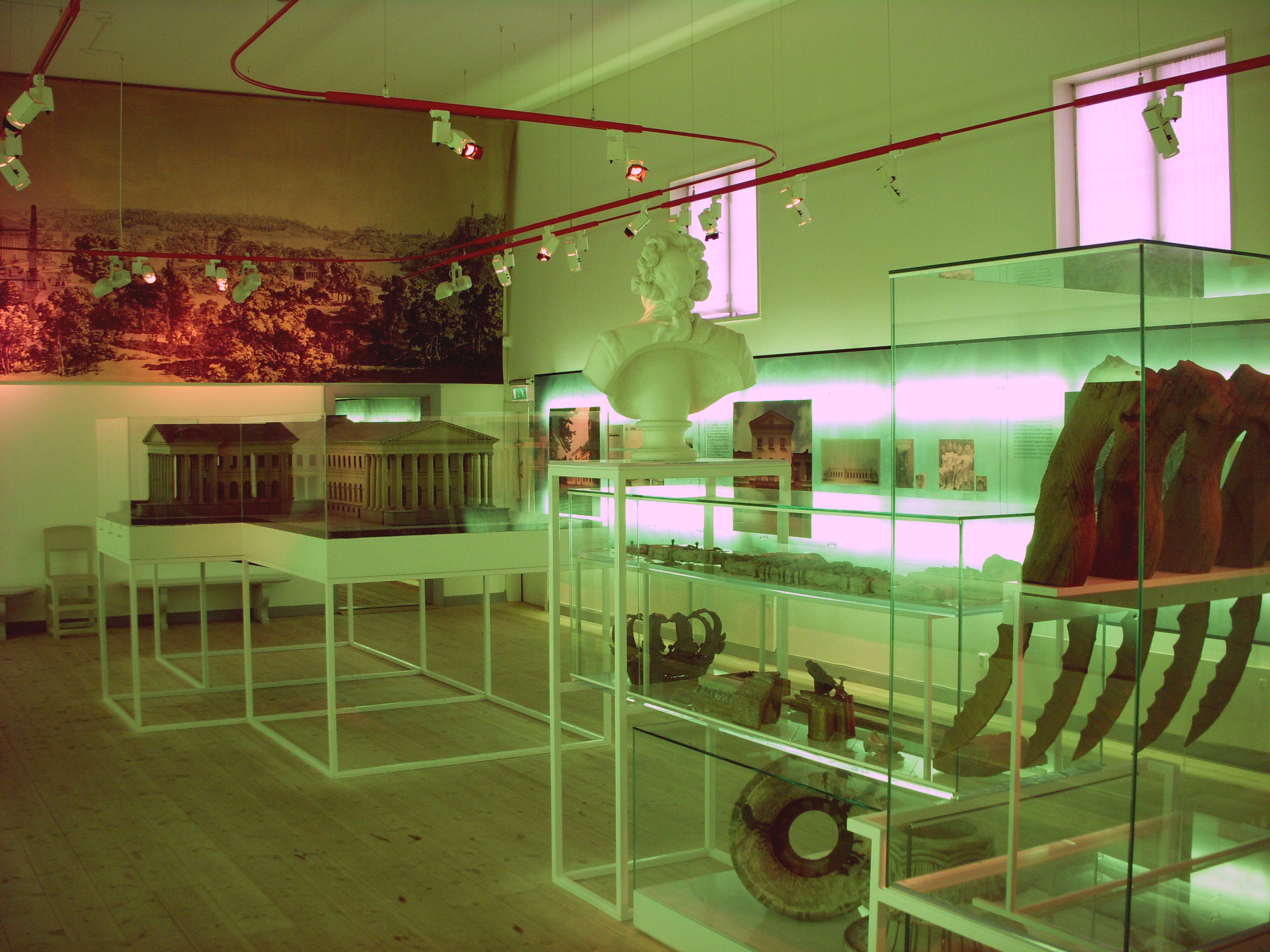
The model exhibited at the Haga Park museum

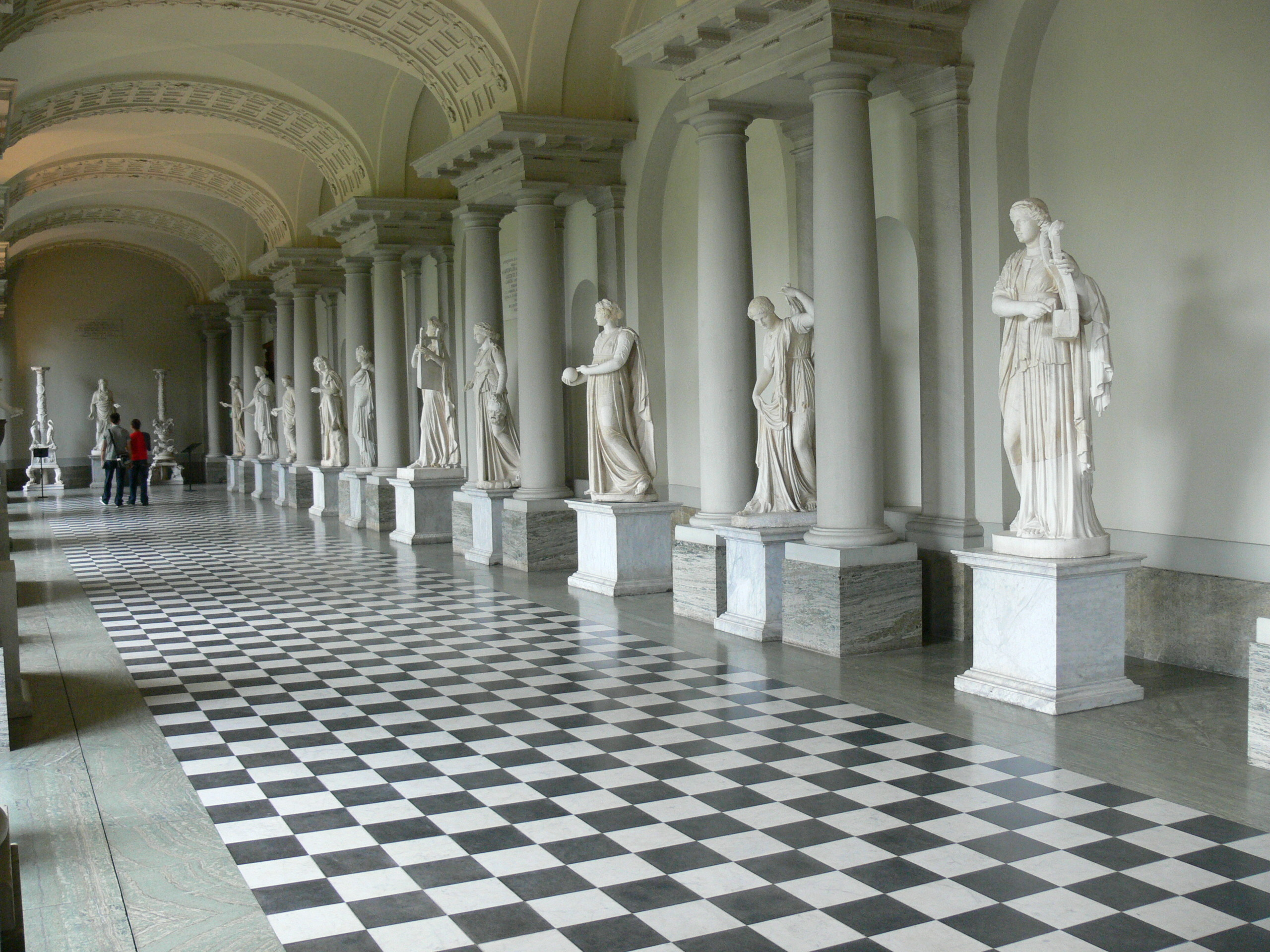
The Roman statues at Gustav III's Museum of Antiquities in the Stockholm palace

== What remains: the Foundations ==
=== Restorations ===
The foundation underwent significant restoration in 1968, which included vegetation removal and masonry repairs. Between 1998 and 1999, palace architect Erik Langlet led another extensive restoration, during which holes in the masonry were patched, and fallen stone blocks were remortared in place. In 2007, students from the Royal Institute of Art conducted a detailed survey of the structure.

=== The Palace Foundation: Present and Future ===
Several dimensioned drawings from Desprez's time remain, showing the planned building's foundation layout in plan and section views. However, few modern surveys existed. In 1973, the Swedish National Board of Public Building produced a 1:500 scale drawing of the foundation, labeled "Haga Ruins (Great Palace Foundation)"; however, it was imprecise. Therefore, in 2006, students from the Royal Institute of Art completed a new, accurate survey. In 2007, these measurements were featured in an exhibition at the park museum, focusing on the history and future of the Great Haga Palace foundation.

Today, the palace foundation is classified as a historical monument.

==== Gallery: The Foundations ====
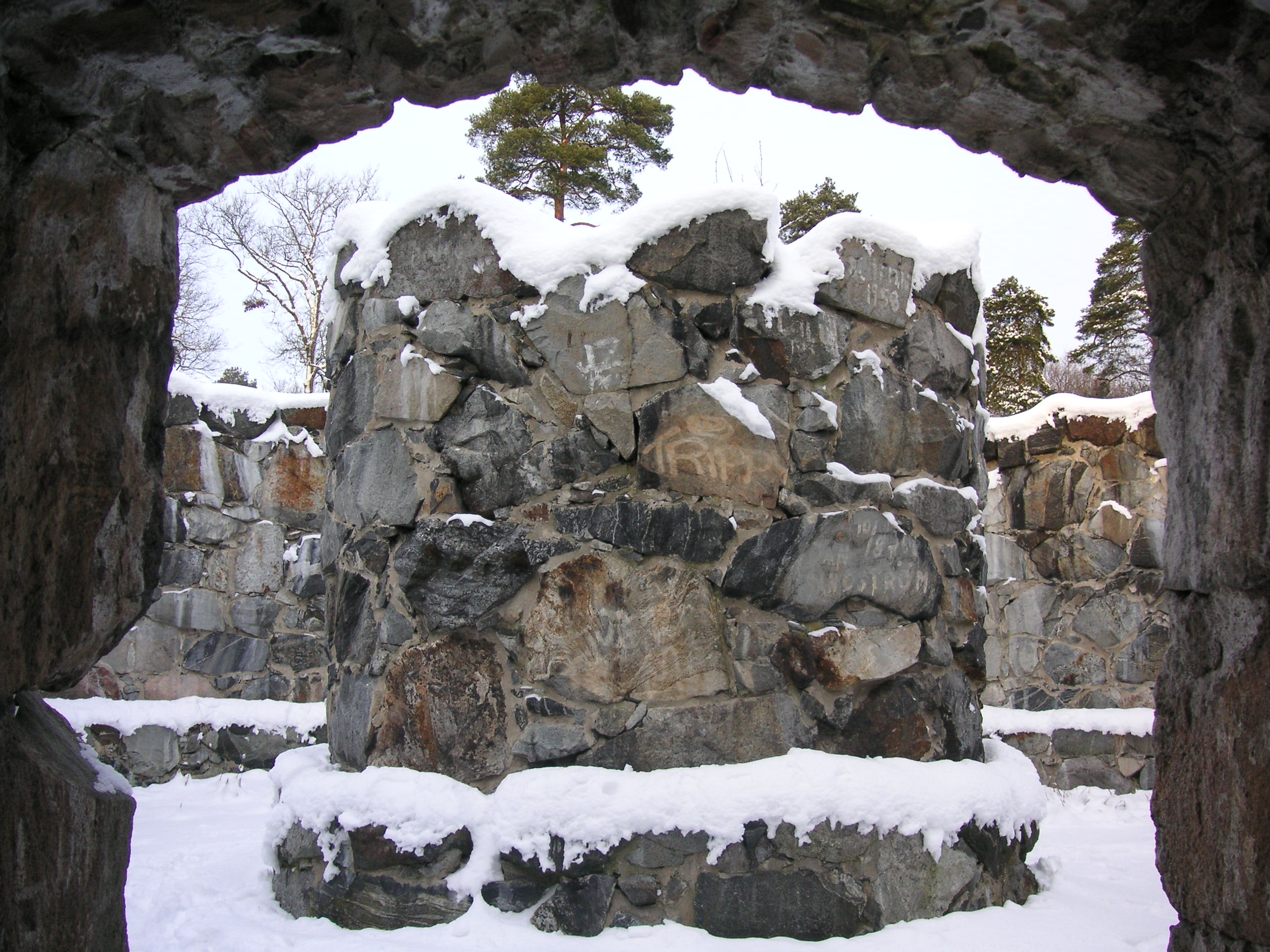
The foundation, central pillar

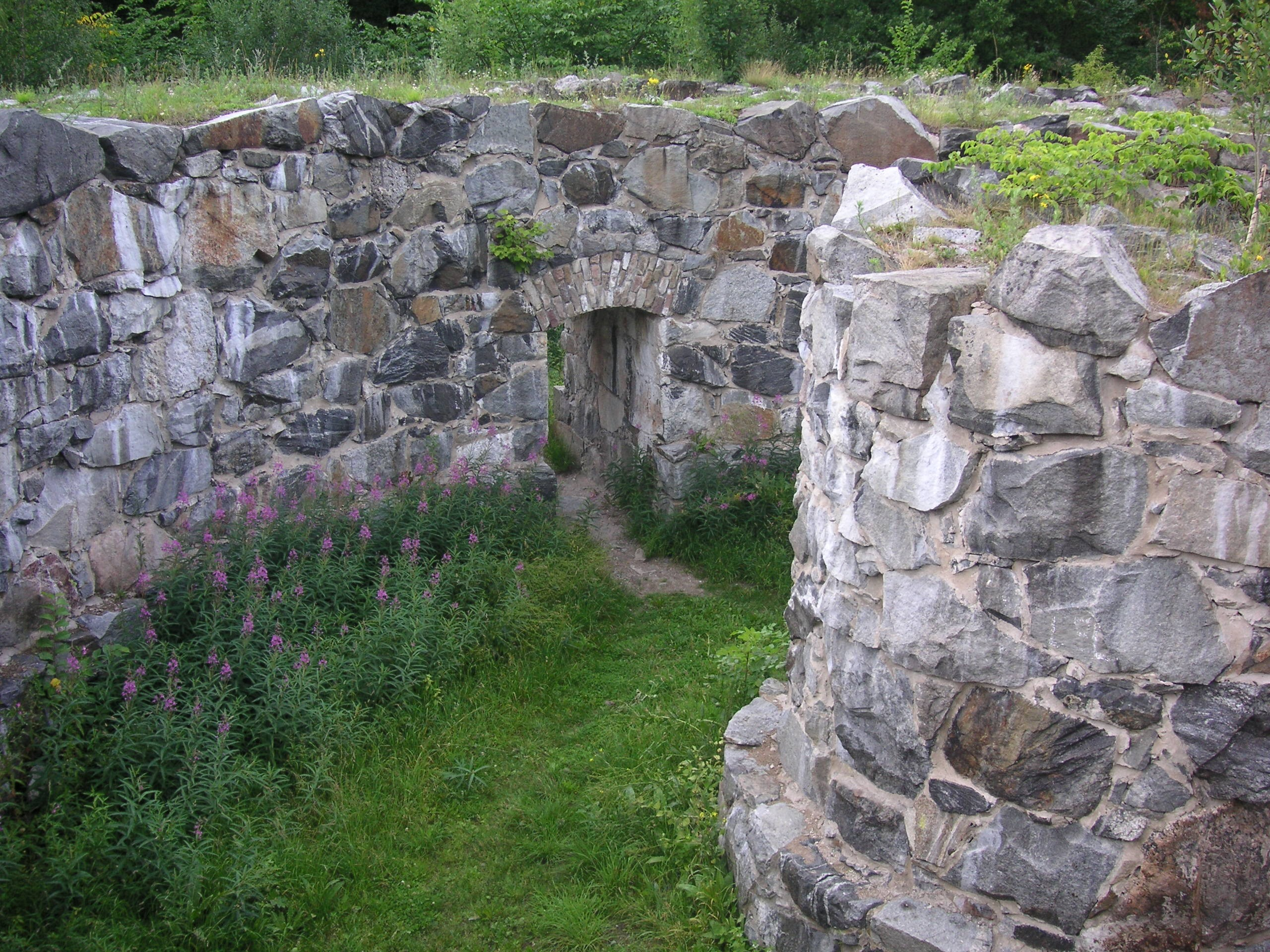
The foundation, central pillar

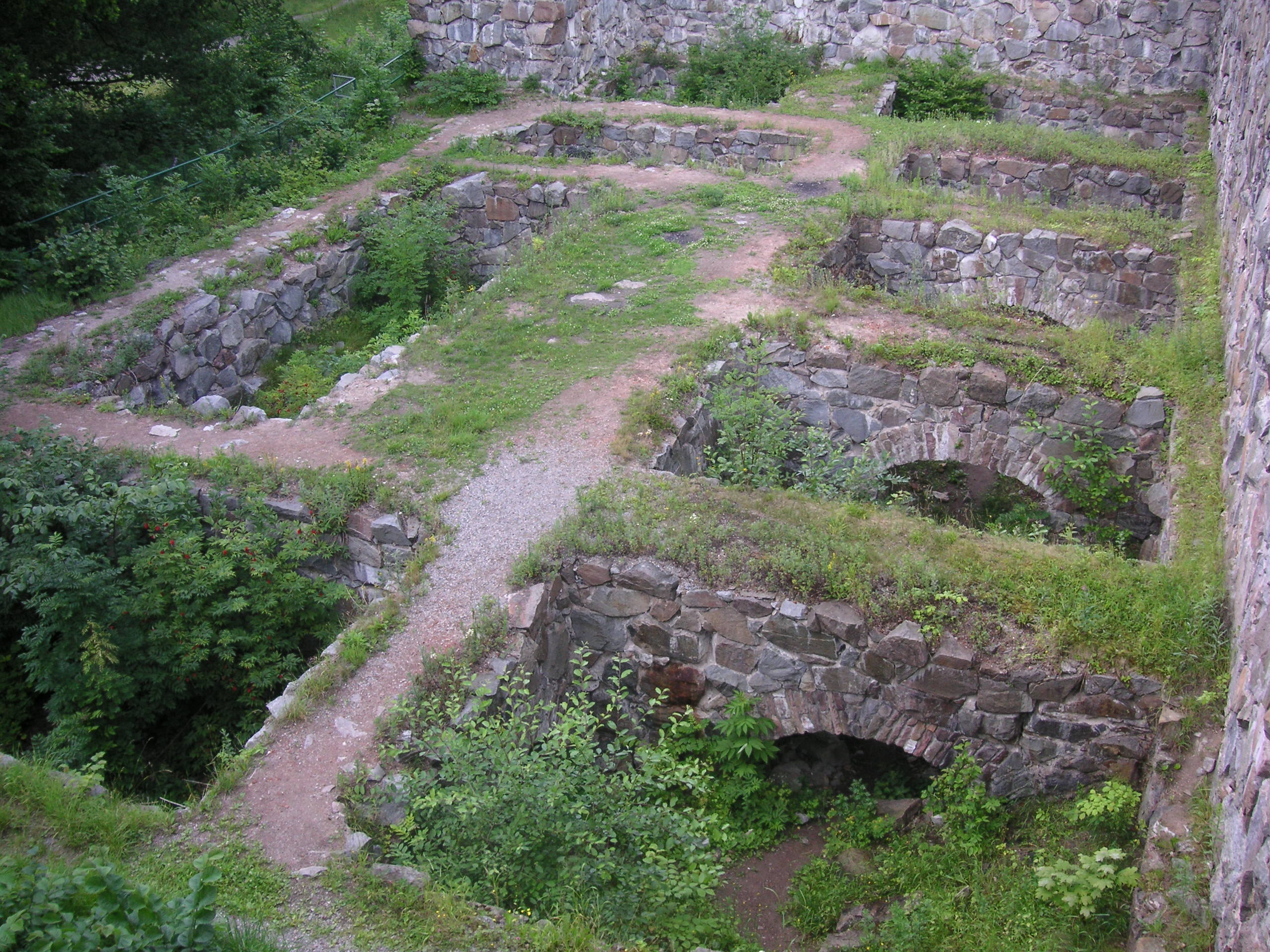
The foundation, northeast section

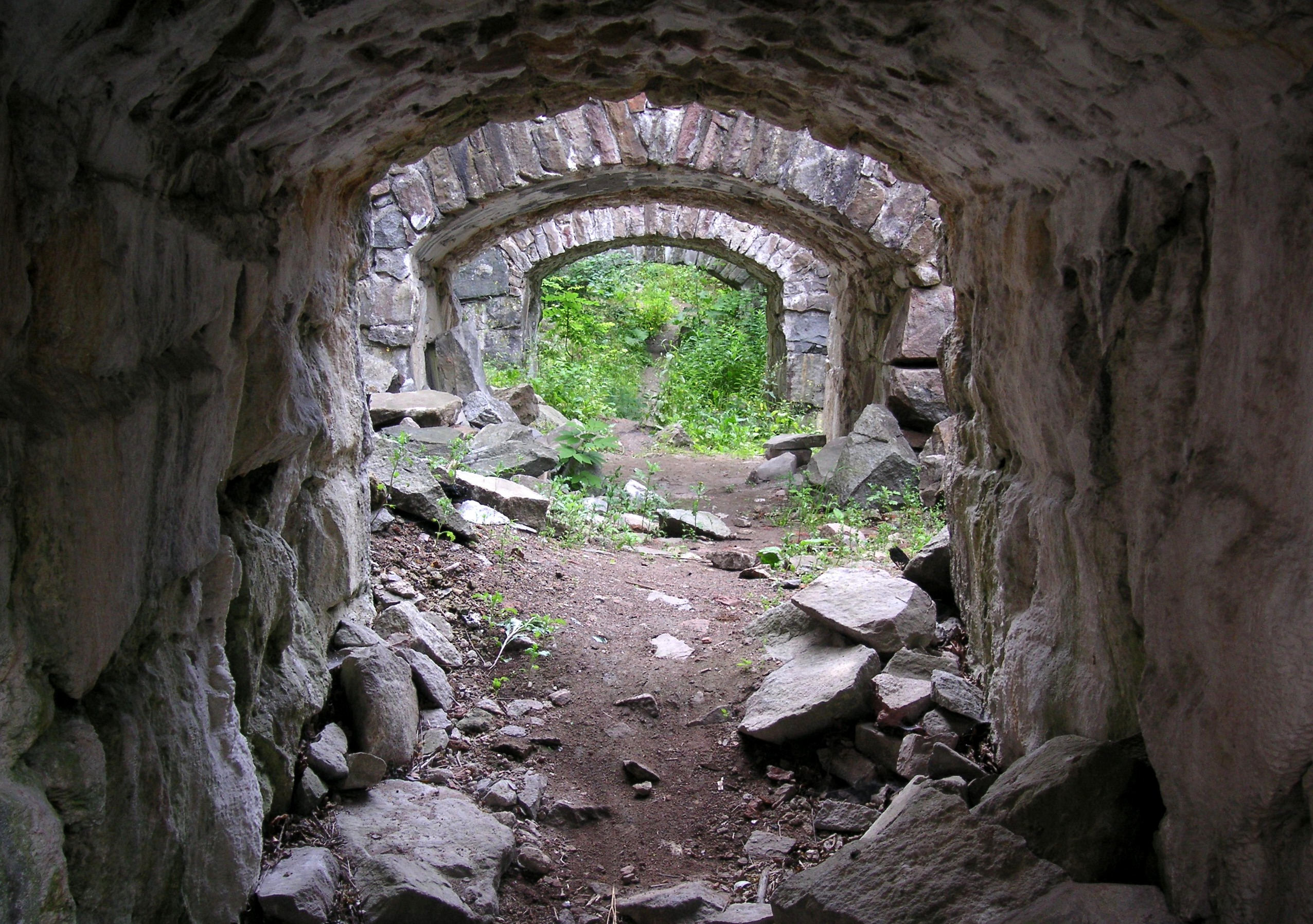
The foundation, cellar vault

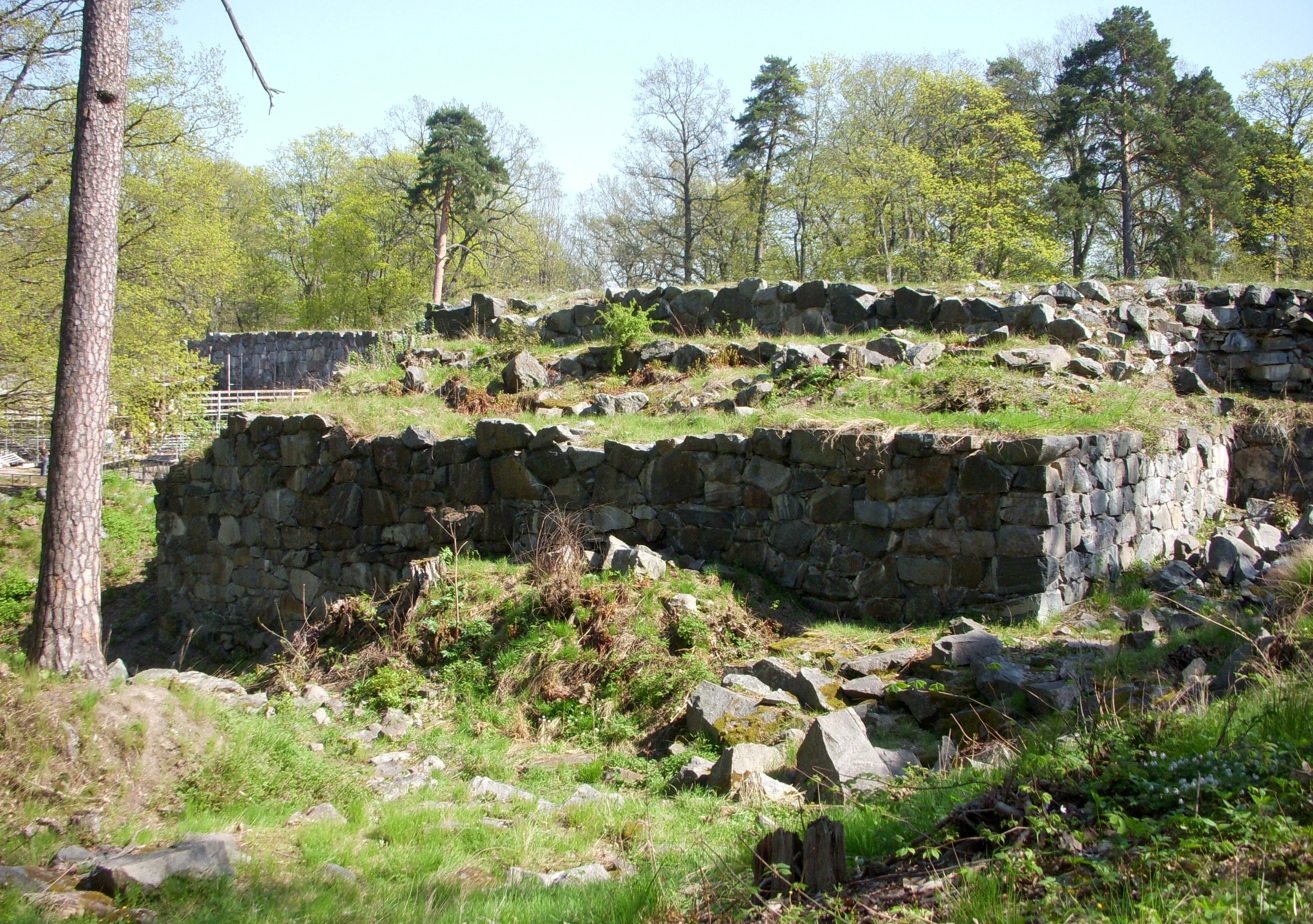
The foundation, northern side

== Literature ==
- Project work by the Royal Institute of Art titled Från slottsprojekt till ruin 2006-2007 2006–2007, exhibited at Haga Park Museum in summer 2007.
- Landell, Nils-Erik (2010). ustaf III och det ofullbordade slottet (in Swedish). Stockholm: Carlsson bokförlag. ISBN 978-91-7331-311-7.
- Sjöström, Ingrid (2009). Haga: ett kungligt kulturarv. De kungliga slotten (in Swedish). Karlstad: Votum förlag. ISBN 978-9185815272.
- Söderberg, Elow (1980). Haga Lustpark (in Swedish). Bokförlaget Plus. ISBN 91-7406-175-5.
- Josephson, Ragnar (1929). "Sveavägens förhistoria". In Albert Lilienberg (ed.). 1928 års förslag till generalplan för Stockholms tätare bebyggda delar (in Swedish). Stockholm.
- Selling, Gösta (1970). Esplanadsystemet och Albert Lindhagen: stadsplanering i Stockholm åren 1857-1887 (in Swedish). Stockholm: Stockholm City Archives.
- Gullberg, Anders (2001). City : drömmen om ett nytt hjärta : moderniseringen av det centrala Stockholm 1951-1979 (två volymer) (in Swedish). Stockholm: Stockholmia. ISBN 91-7031-078-5.
