= Hagaparken =

Park in Solna Municipality, Sweden

Coordinates: 59°21′40″N 18°02′00″E

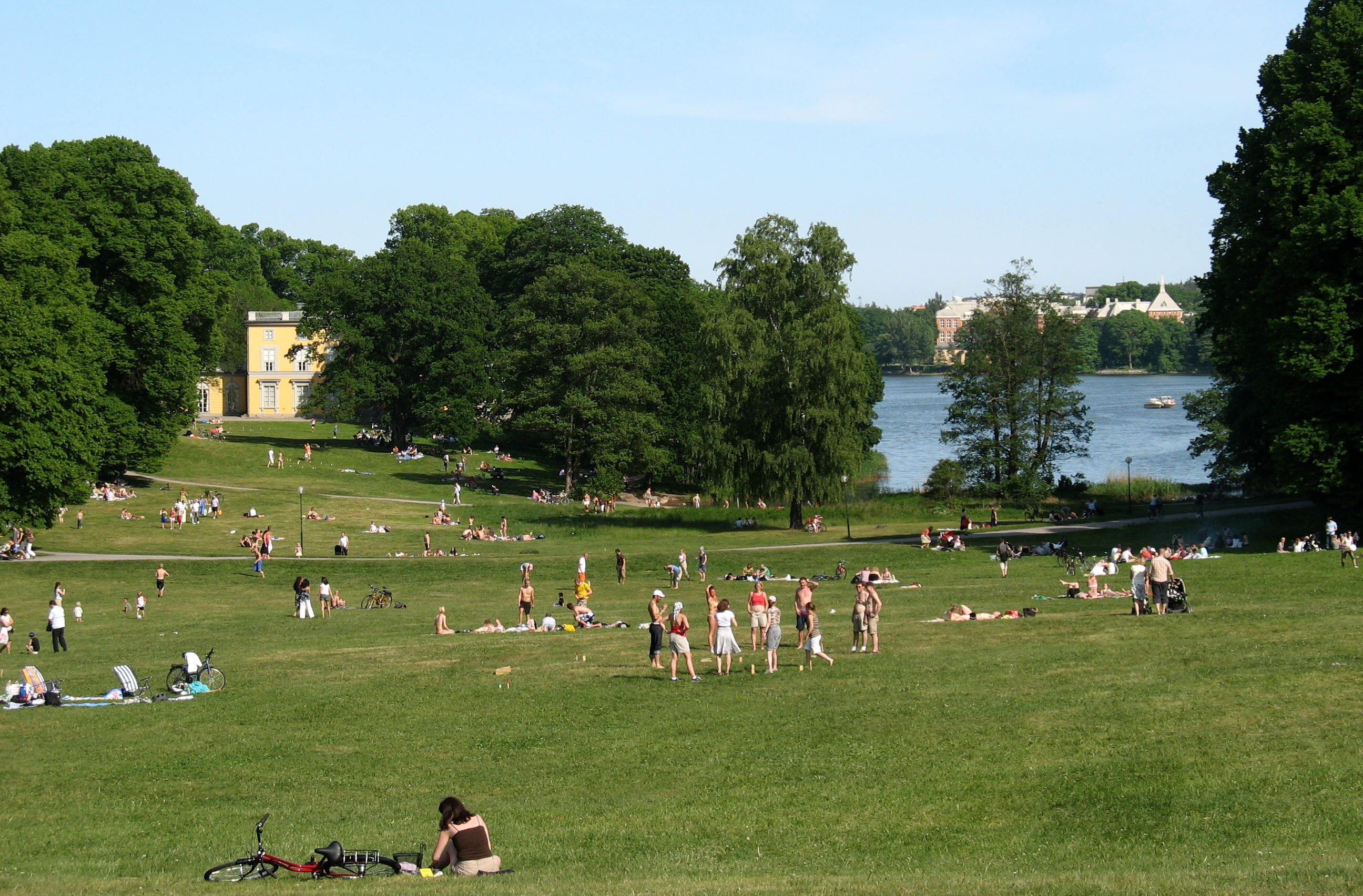
- The lawn in front of the Copper Tents on 6 June 2007, the National Day of Sweden. In the background on the other side of Brunnsviken the red brick buildings of the Albano campus of Stockholm University can be seen.
- Interactive map of Hagaparken
- Location: Solna, Stockholm, Sweden

Hagaparken ("Haga Park"), or simply Haga in Solna Municipality just north of Stockholm, Sweden, is a vast and popular nature area, with large lawns, woods and gardens.

== Description ==
Hagaparken is located along the western shoreline of Brunnsviken and is a part of the Royal National City Park. Within the park are Haga Palace, King Gustav III's Pavilion, the Chinese Pavilion, the Haga Echo Temple, the Turkish Kiosk, the Haga Palace Ruins (which is not really a ruin as it is the remains of a palace never finished) and several other interesting buildings on the grounds (such as the peculiar Copper Tents and also the Butterfly House). Included in the Haga Park is also the Royal Burial Ground of the Swedish Royal family (since 1922), where several members and ancestors of the present Swedish royal Bernadotte family rest. Ulriksdal Palace (Swedish: Ulriksdals slott) is a royal palace situated in Hagaparken.

== History ==
The master plan for development was originally designed by architect Fredrik Magnus Piper (1746–1824). Hagaparken has historically been favoured by Swedish royalty, especially Gustav III who founded it and developed it 1780-1797, and by the famous troubadour Carl Michael Bellman, a contemporary of Gustav III, who is much associated with Haga due to the lyrics of his compositions, poems and his writings. The song Fjäriln vingad syns på Haga (The wingéd butterfly is seen in Haga), one of the best-known of Bellman's Fredman's Songs, is entirely dedicated to the park.

In 1935, Hagaparken became a state building monument and has been part of Sweden's first national city park, the Royal National City Park, since 1994. Today it is managed by the State Property Agency (Statens fastighetsverk) and the Royal Djurgården Administration (Kungliga Djurgårdens Förvaltning).

== Gallery ==
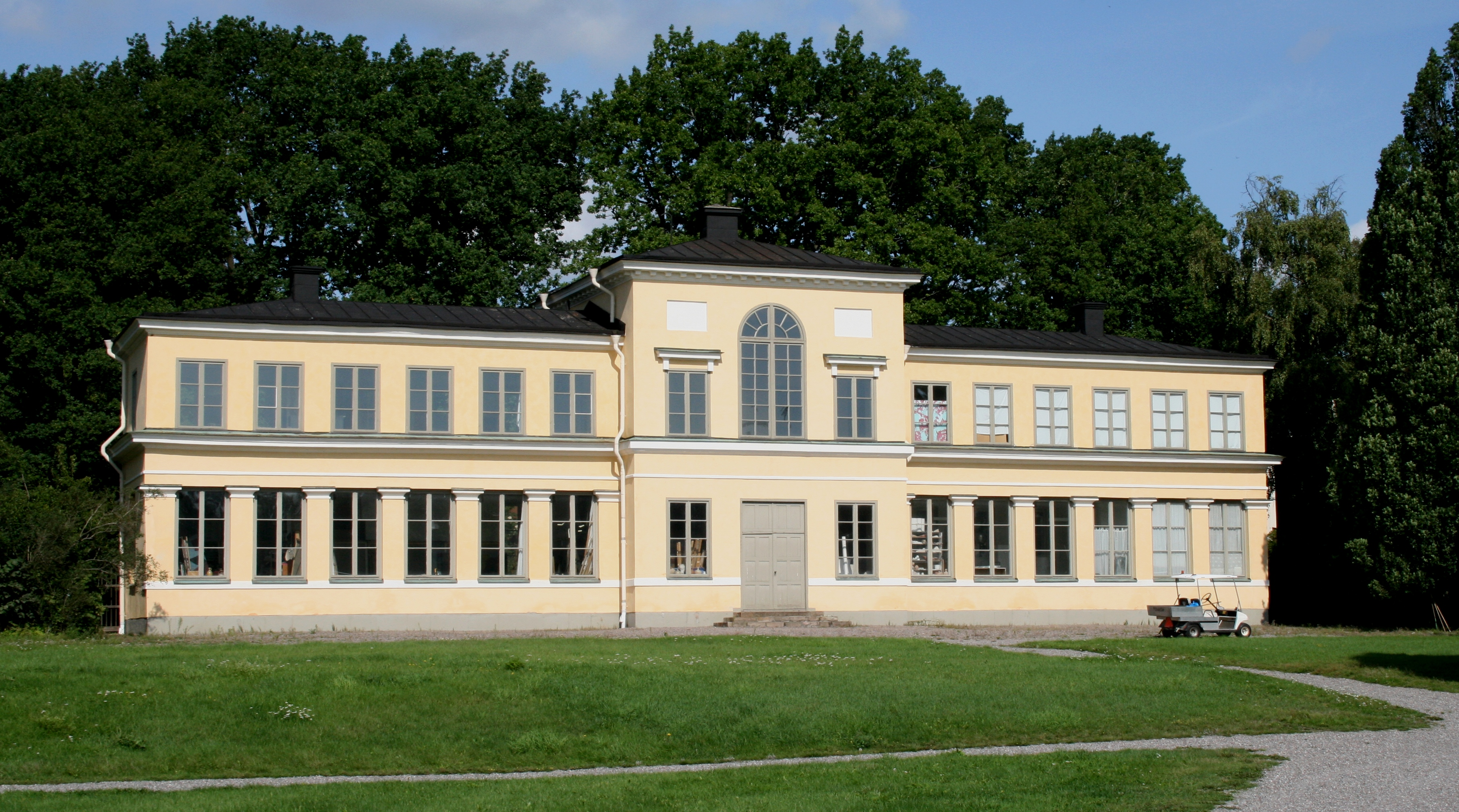
The Orangery

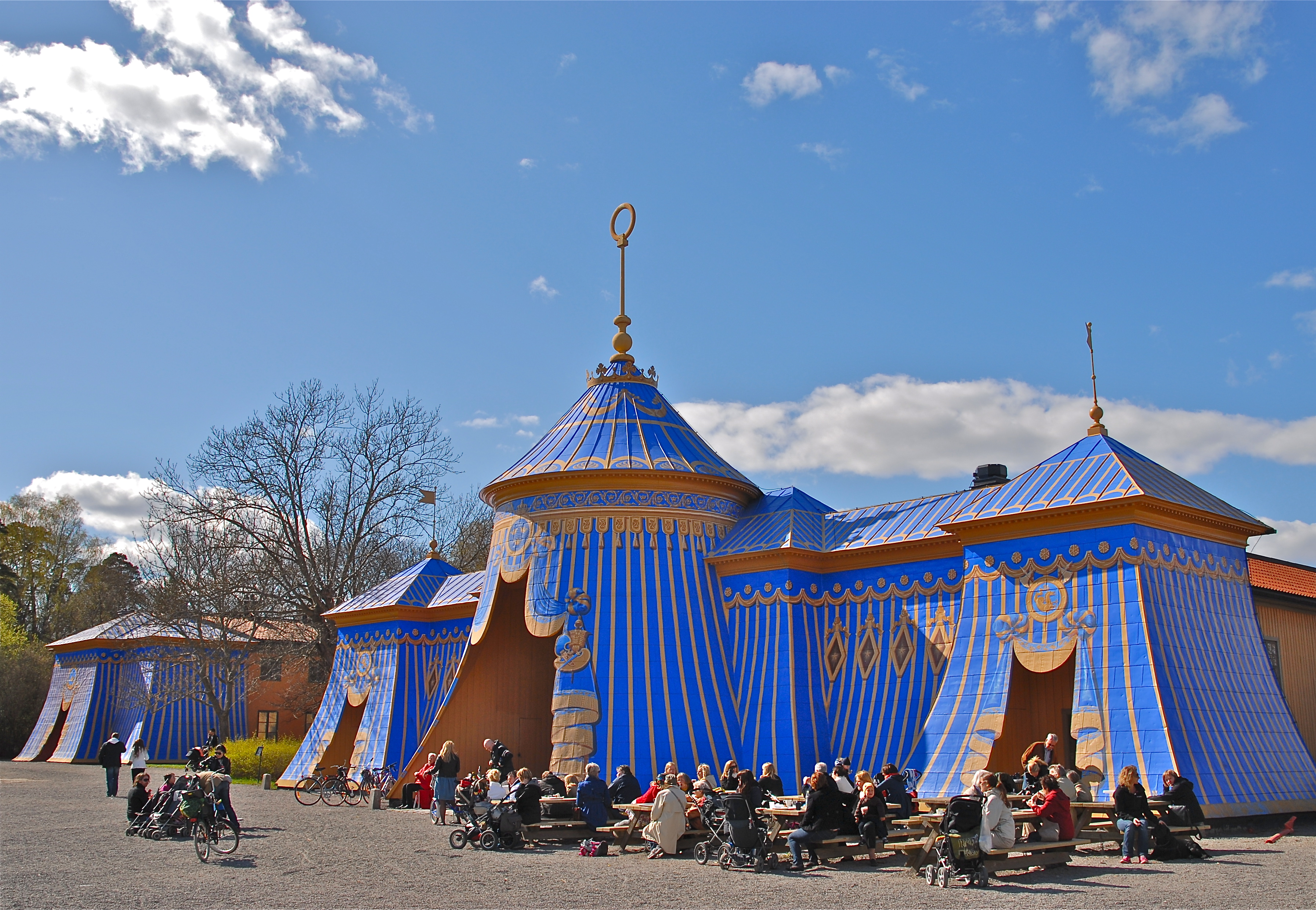
Copper Tents

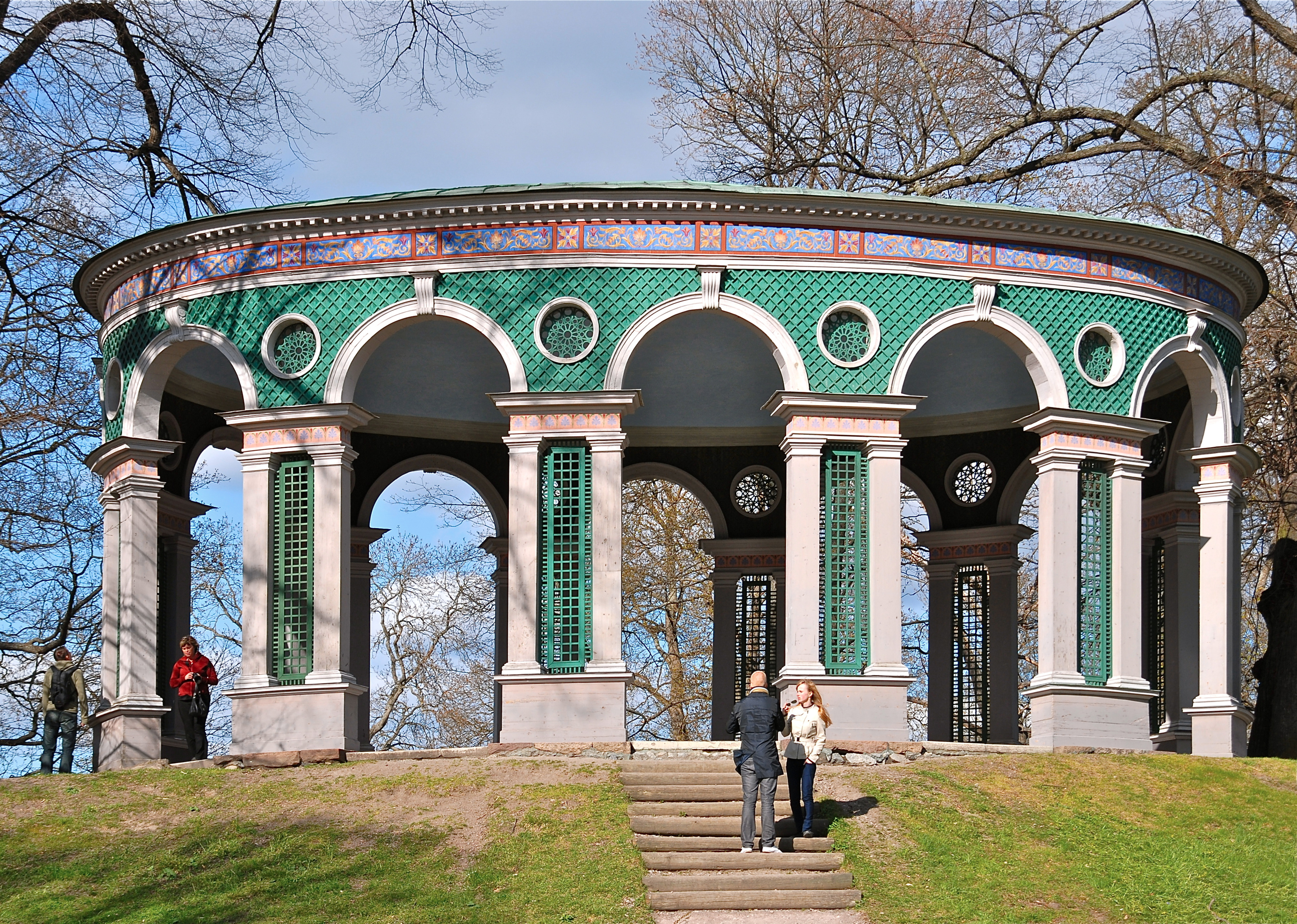
Haga Echo Temple

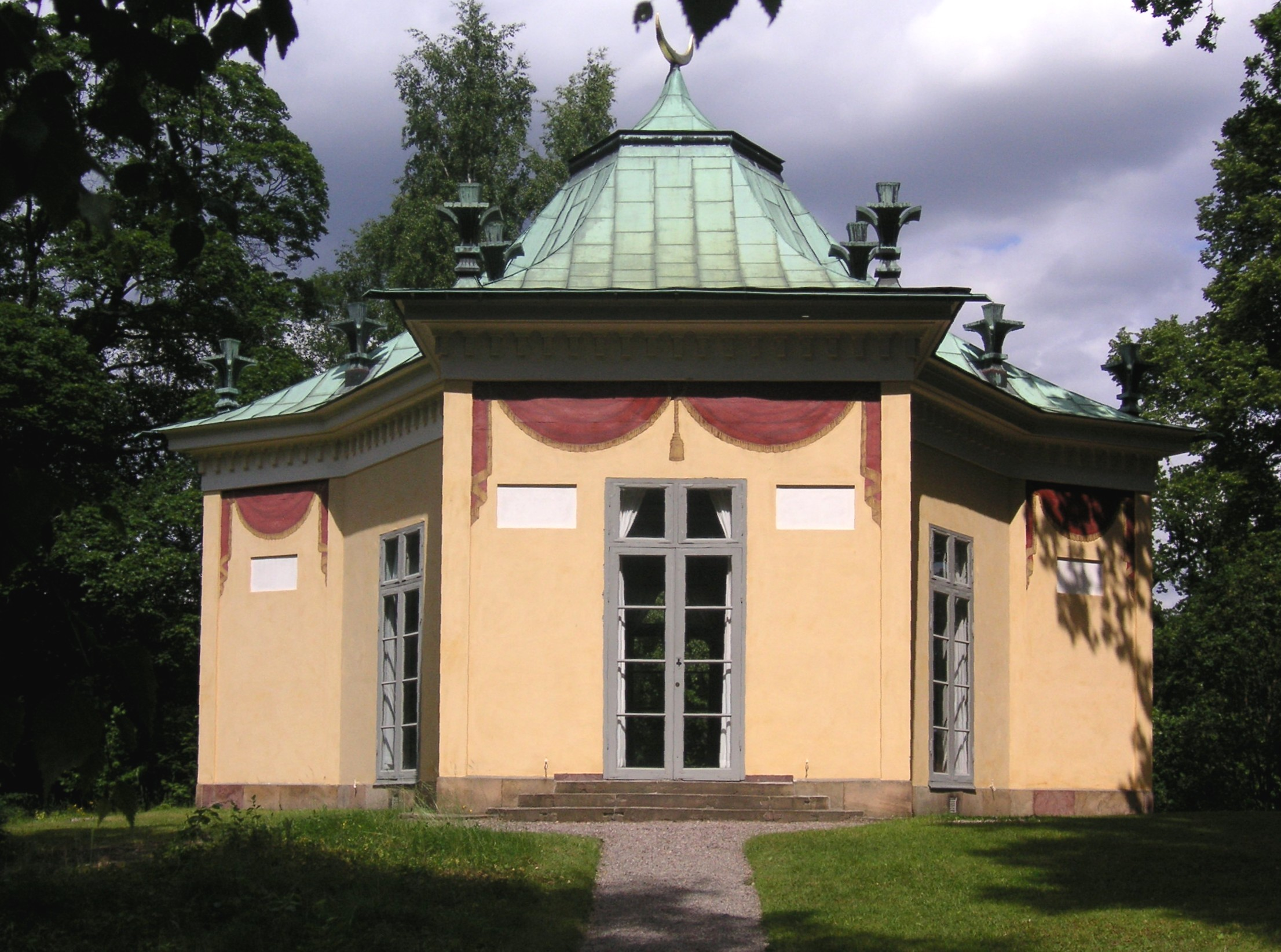
Turkish Kiosk

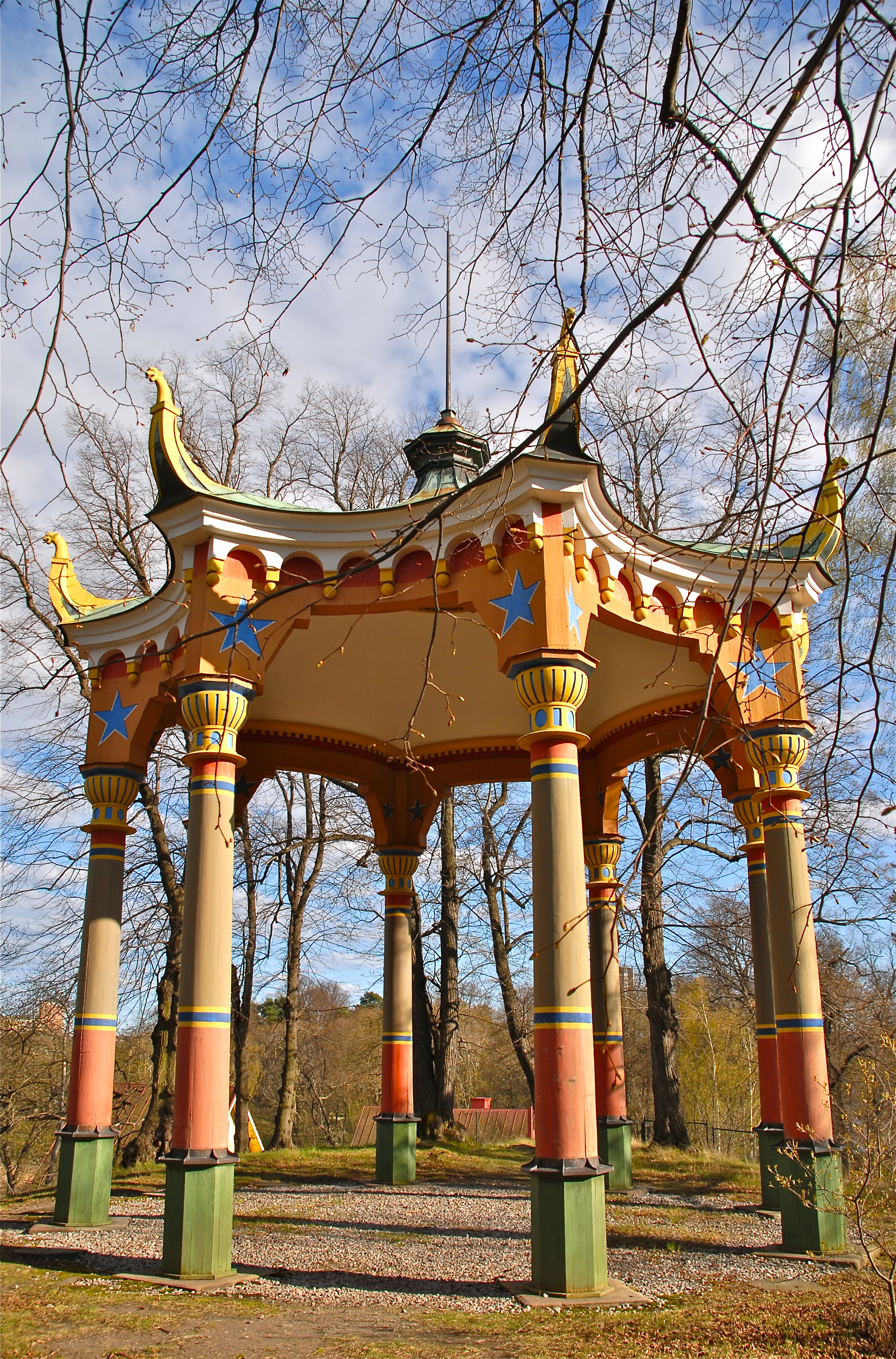
Chinese Pavilion

== See also ==
- Painshill – Turkish Tent, Temple of Bacchus, Gothic Temple
