= Results of the 2003 Swedish euro referendum =

Sweden held a non-binding referendum on the introduction of the euro on 14 September 2003.

== National results ==
Blank votes counted towards the net total. 5,719,240 ballots were cast for either yes or no, whereas a total of 5,840,313 votes counted towards the total.

Summary of the referendum	Votes	Percent
Yes	2,453,899	42.0
No	3,265,341	55.9
Blank votes	121,073	2.1
Total	5,840,313	100
Invalid votes	3,475	
Eligible voters	7,077,502	
Turnout	5,843,788	82.6

Source: Valmyndigheten

== Results by greater region ==
Location	Share	Votes	Yes	%	No	%
Götaland	48.0	2,740,616	1,184,720	43.2	1,555,896	55.5
Svealand	38.8	2,221,080	1,056,891	47.6	1,164,189	52.4
Norrland	13.2	757,544	212,288	28.0	545,256	72.0
Total	100.0	5,719,240	2,453,899	42.9	3,265,341	57.1
Source: val.se

== Parliamentary constituency results ==
Although blank votes, unlike in Riksdag elections counted towards the total, these tables only list yes and no votes. Full results for blank votes are available at the Electoral Agency's website. While European Parliament elections are counted through counties, the nominal constituencies for the Riksdag extend to national referendums. Regardless, results were published both at constituency and county levels. "Votes" also denotes invalid ones.

Location	Land	Turnout	Share	Votes	Yes	%	No	%
Blekinge	G	84.3	1.7	98,747	38,338	38.8	60,409	61.2
Dalarna	S	84.8	3.2	182,456	52,916	29.0	129,540	71.0
Gothenburg	G	78.5	5.2	299,231	143,296	47.9	155,935	52.1
Gotland	G	81.8	0.6	35,927	14,292	39.8	21,635	60.2
Gävleborg	N	82.9	3.1	179,430	53,006	29.5	126,424	70.5
Halland	G	84.3	3.1	179,819	82,217	45.7	97,602	54.3
Jämtland	N	84.8	1.6	85,159	18,492	21.7	66,667	78.3
Jönköping	G	84.6	3.7	210,986	80,495	38.2	130,491	61.8
Kalmar	G	83.2	2.6	151,507	54,156	35.7	97,351	64.3
Kronoberg	G	84.0	2.0	114,812	45,566	39.7	69,246	60.3
Malmö	G	76.0	2.8	160,274	87,473	54.6	72,801	45.4
Norrbotten	N	82.7	2.9	163,889	47,240	28.8	116,649	71.2
Skåne NE	G	82.0	3.2	184,309	78,626	42.7	105,683	57.3
Skåne S	G	84.6	3.7	211,621	114,840	54.3	96,781	45.7
Skåne W	G	80.2	2.9	164,732	82,548	50.1	82,184	49.9
Stockholm	S	79.6	8.5	487,723	279,842	57.4	207,881	42.6
Stockholm County	S	81.8	11.8	673,156	368,677	54.8	304,479	45.2
Södermanland	S	83.3	2.9	165,623	73,181	44.2	92,442	55.8
Uppsala	S	83.8	3.3	191,322	86,237	45.1	105,085	54.9
Värmland	S	83.6	3.1	179,092	60,223	33.6	118,869	66.4
Västerbotten	N	85.3	2.9	168,443	44,839	26.6	123,604	73.4
Västernorrland	N	83.8	2.8	160,623	48,711	30.3	111,912	69.7
Västmanland	S	82.6	2.9	165,314	69,410	42.0	95,904	58.0
Västra Götaland E	G	84.0	2.9	163,301	60,478	37.0	102,823	63.0
Västra Götaland N	G	84.1	2.9	168,490	62,230	36.9	106,260	63.1
Västra Götaland S	G	83.2	2.0	117,153	44,671	38.1	72,482	61.9
Västra Götaland W	G	84.0	3.7	210,912	87,424	41.5	123,488	58.5
Örebro	S	83.6	3.1	176,394	66,405	37.6	109,989	62.4
Östergötland	G	84.6	4.7	268,795	108,070	40.2	160,725	59.8
Total		82.6	100.0	5,719,240	2,453,899	42.9	3,265,341	57.1
Source: val.se

=== Metropolitan counties ===
Three counties had multiple constituencies.

Location	Turnout	Share	Votes	Yes	%	No	%
Skåne	80.9	12.6	720,936	363,487	50.4	357,449	49.6
Stockholm	80.9	20.3	1,160,879	648,519	55.9	512,360	44.1
Västra Götaland	82.1	16.8	959,087	398,099	41.5	560,988	58.5
Total	82.6	100.0	5,719,240	2,453,899	42.9	3,265,341	57.1
Source: val.se

== Municipal results ==
=== Blekinge ===
Location	Turnout	Share	Votes	Yes	%	No	%
Karlshamn	84.1	20.7	20,441	7,659	37.5	12,782	62.5
Karlskrona	85.4	40.8	40,312	16,228	40.3	24,084	59.7
Olofström	82.1	8.7	8,632	3,269	37.9	5,363	62.1
Ronneby	84.1	19.0	18,754	6,970	37.2	11,784	62.8
Sölvesborg	82.9	10.7	10,608	4,212	39.7	6,396	60.3
Total	84.3	1.7	98,747	38,338	38.8	60,409	61.2
Source: val.se

=== Dalarna ===
Location	Turnout	Share	Votes	Yes	%	No	%
Avesta	83.5	8.0	14,660	4,425	30.2	10,235	69.8
Borlänge	84.8	16.8	30,716	9,651	31.4	21,065	68.6
Falun	85.3	19.8	36,072	12,521	34.7	23,551	65.3
Gagnef	86.3	3.5	6,465	1,694	26.2	4,771	73.8
Hedemora	83.6	5.6	10,131	2,614	25.8	7,517	74.2
Leksand	86.0	5.6	10,250	3,167	30.9	7,083	69.1
Ludvika	83.7	9.5	17,248	5,143	29.8	12,105	70.2
Malung	84.3	3.9	7,067	1,843	26.1	5,224	73.9
Mora	85.3	7.3	13,361	3,358	25.1	10,003	74.9
Orsa	85.6	2.6	4,668	1,000	21.4	3,668	78.6
Rättvik	83.6	3.9	7,206	1,849	25.7	5,357	74.3
Smedjebacken	85.2	4.1	7,457	2,079	27.9	5,378	72.1
Säter	86.4	4.0	7,243	1,892	26.1	5,351	73.9
Vansbro	85.3	2.6	4,803	843	17.6	3,960	82.4
Älvdalen	83.8	2.8	5,109	837	16.4	4,272	83.6
Total	84.8	3.2	182,456	52,916	29.0	129,540	71.0
Source: val.se

=== Gotland ===
Location	Turnout	Share	Votes	Yes	%	No	%
Gotland	81.8	100.0	35,927	14,292	39.8	21,635	60.2
Total	81.8	0.6	35,927	14,292	39.8	21,635	60.2
Source: val.se

=== Gävleborg ===
Location	Turnout	Share	Votes	Yes	%	No	%
Bollnäs	82.2	9.5	17,031	4,299	25.2	12,732	74.8
Gävle	82.8	32.7	58,760	22,351	38.0	36,409	62.0
Hofors	82.9	3.8	6,747	1,933	28.6	4,814	71.4
Hudiksvall	82.9	13.3	23,886	6,025	25.2	17,861	74.8
Ljusdal	81.5	7.1	12,679	2,766	21.8	9,913	78.2
Nordanstig	83.2	3.6	6,456	1,230	19.1	5,226	80.9
Ockelbo	84.3	2.2	4,002	885	22.1	3,117	77.9
Ovanåker	84.1	4.5	8,035	1,585	19.7	6,450	80.3
Sandviken	83.7	13.5	24,195	7,544	31.2	16,651	68.8
Söderhamn	82.9	9.8	17,639	4,388	24.9	13,251	75.1
Total	82.9	3.1	179,430	53,006	29.5	126,424	70.5
Source: val.se

=== Halland ===
Location	Turnout	Share	Votes	Yes	%	No	%
Falkenberg	83.3	13.7	24,721	10,365	41.9	14,356	58.1
Halmstad	82.4	31.2	56,060	27,192	48.5	28,868	51.5
Hylte	82.4	3.6	6,430	2,391	37.2	4,039	62.8
Kungsbacka	87.3	24.0	43,089	22,196	51.5	20,893	48.5
Laholm	83.7	8.1	14,570	5,820	39.9	8,750	60.1
Varberg	85.0	19.4	34,949	14,253	40.8	20,696	59.2
Total	84.3	3.1	179,819	82,217	45.7	97,602	54.3
Source: val.se

=== Jämtland ===
Location	Turnout	Share	Votes	Yes	%	No	%
Berg	84.3	6.1	5,181	826	15.9	4,355	84.1
Bräcke	83.3	5.6	4,783	884	18.5	3,899	81.5
Härjedalen	83.2	8.8	7,490	1,335	17.8	6,155	82.2
Krokom	85.9	10.7	9,148	1,755	19.2	7,393	80.8
Ragunda	84.7	4.7	4,027	545	13.5	3,482	86.5
Strömsund	85.1	10.6	9,035	1,191	13.2	7,844	86.8
Åre	84.4	7.4	6,264	1,513	24.2	4,751	75.8
Östersund	85.1	46.1	39,231	10,443	26.6	28,788	73.4
Total	84.8	1.5	85,159	18,492	21.7	66,667	78.3
Source: val.se

=== Jönköping ===
Location	Turnout	Share	Votes	Yes	%	No	%
Aneby	86.6	2.0	4,267	1,122	26.3	3,145	73.7
Eksjö	85.6	5.2	11,051	3,857	34.9	7,194	65.1
Gislaved	82.6	8.7	18,359	7,275	39.6	11,084	60.4
Gnosjö	82.3	2.8	5,984	2,378	39.7	3,606	60.3
Habo	88.5	2.9	6,126	2,243	36.6	3,883	63.4
Jönköping	84.4	36.5	77,005	33,638	43.7	43,367	56.3
Mullsjö	86.2	2.2	4,563	1,647	36.1	2,916	63.9
Nässjö	86.5	9.2	19,326	6,237	32.3	13,089	67.7
Sävsjö	84.7	3.3	6,994	1,708	24.4	5,286	75.6
Tranås	84.5	5.5	11,536	4,042	35.0	7,494	65.0
Vaggeryd	84.8	3.8	8,009	2,857	35.7	5,152	64.3
Vetlanda	85.1	8.2	17,277	5,187	30.0	12,090	70.0
Värnamo	83.8	9.7	20,489	8,304	40.5	12,185	59.5
Total	84.6	3.7	210,986	80,495	38.2	130,491	61.8
Source: val.se

=== Kalmar ===
Location	Turnout	Share	Votes	Yes	%	No	%
Borgholm	81.9	4.8	7,272	2,710	37.3	4,562	62.7
Emmaboda	82.5	4.1	6,233	1,993	32.0	4,240	68.0
Hultsfred	82.4	6.2	9,361	2,603	27.8	6,758	72.2
Högsby	81.6	2.6	3,872	1,126	29.1	2,746	70.9
Kalmar	83.9	25.8	39,110	17,041	43.6	22,069	56.4
Mönsterås	83.2	5.6	8,436	2,548	30.2	5,888	69.8
Mörbylånga	85.8	5.8	8,831	3,403	38.5	5,428	61.5
Nybro	82.4	8.5	12,845	4,473	34.8	8,372	65.2
Oskarshamn	83.9	11.3	17,117	5,795	33.9	11,322	66.1
Torsås	82.3	3.1	4,698	1,472	31.3	3,226	68.7
Vimmerby	83.3	6.6	9,945	2,904	29.2	7,041	70.8
Västervik	82.6	15.7	23,787	8,088	34.0	15,699	66.0
Total	83.2	2.7	151,507	54,156	35.7	97,351	64.3
Source: val.se

=== Kronoberg ===
Location	Turnout	Share	Votes	Yes	%	No	%
Alvesta	84.0	10.6	12,116	4,149	34.2	7,967	65.8
Lessebo	84.1	4.6	5,232	1,800	34.4	3,432	65.6
Ljungby	83.8	15.1	17,317	6,640	38.3	10,677	61.7
Markaryd	81.6	5.3	6,115	1,907	31.2	4,208	68.8
Tingsryd	82.0	7.3	8,359	2,685	32.1	5,674	67.9
Uppvidinge	83.0	5.3	6,102	1,850	30.3	4,252	69.7
Växjö	84.9	43.2	49,570	22,558	45.5	27,012	54.5
Älmhult	83.5	8.7	10,001	3,977	39.8	6,024	60.2
Total	84.0	2.0	114,812	45,566	39.7	69,246	60.3
Source: val.se

=== Norrbotten ===
Location	Turnout	Share	Votes	Yes	%	No	%
Arjeplog	82.7	1.3	2,196	459	20.9	1,737	79.1
Arvidsjaur	84.4	2.9	4,728	920	19.5	3,808	80.5
Boden	84.7	11.3	18,589	5,315	28.2	13,274	70.5
Gällivare	80.2	7.5	12,288	2,446	19.9	9,842	80.1
Haparanda	68.1	3.5	5,697	2,895	50.8	2,802	49.2
Jokkmokk	81.2	2.2	3,653	621	17.0	3,032	83.0
Kalix	82.9	7.1	11,603	3,328	28.7	8,275	71.3
Kiruna	79.1	8.8	14,391	3,299	22.9	11,092	77.1
Luleå	84.2	28.8	47,167	17,218	36.5	29,949	63.5
Pajala	79.8	2.8	4,560	916	20.1	3,644	79.9
Piteå	87.0	16.7	27,380	7,203	26.3	20,177	73.7
Älvsbyn	84.7	3.5	5,791	988	17.1	4,803	82.9
Överkalix	80.0	1.6	2,589	608	23.5	1,981	76.5
Övertorneå	75.6	2.0	3,257	1,024	31.4	2,233	68.6
Total	82.7	2.8	163,889	47,240	28.8	116,649	71.2
Source: val.se

=== Skåne ===
==== Malmö ====
Location	Turnout	Share	Votes	Yes	%	No	%
Malmö	76.0	100.0	160,274	87,473	54.6	72,801	45.4
Total	76.0	2.8	160,274	87,473	54.6	72,801	45.4
Source: val.se

==== Skåne NE ====
Location	Turnout	Share	Votes	Yes	%	No	%
Bromölla	83.2	4.2	7,724	2,740	35.5	4,984	64.5
Båstad	83.3	5.1	9,411	5,058	53.7	4,353	46.3
Hässleholm	82.2	16.7	30,777	11,342	36.9	19,435	63.1
Klippan	78.6	5.2	9,631	3,861	40.1	5,770	59.9
Kristianstad	82.3	25.8	47,464	21,716	45.8	25,748	54.2
Osby	83.5	4.4	8,158	2,577	31.6	5,581	68.4
Perstorp	79.6	2.3	4,170	1,700	40.8	2,470	59.2
Simrishamn	81.3	6.7	12,418	5,885	47.4	6,533	52.6
Tomelilla	80.5	4.2	7,768	2,954	38.0	4,814	62.0
Åstorp	78.9	4.2	7,760	3,434	44.3	4,326	55.7
Ängelholm	83.4	13.3	24,460	12,187	49.8	12,273	50.2
Örkelljunga	79.9	3.1	5,794	1,994	34.4	3,800	65.6
Östra Göinge	83.0	4.8	8,774	3,178	36.2	5,596	63.8
Total	82.0	3.2	184,309	78,626	42.7	105,683	57.3
Source: val.se

==== Skåne S ====
Location	Turnout	Share	Votes	Yes	%	No	%
Burlöv	81.7	4.4	9,360	4,692	50.1	4,668	49.9
Kävlinge	86.1	7.7	16,259	8,233	50.6	8,026	49.4
Lomma	89.8	5.8	12,340	7,853	63.6	4,487	36.4
Lund	84.4	31.6	66,915	38,824	58.0	28,091	42.0
Sjöbo	81.2	5.0	10,632	4,166	39.2	6,466	60.8
Skurup	82.8	4.1	8,781	3,707	42.2	5,074	57.8
Staffanstorp	87.2	6.1	12,871	7,171	55.7	5,700	44.3
Svedala	86.3	5.5	11,575	5,805	50.2	5,770	49.8
Trelleborg	81.2	11.5	24,362	11,310	46.4	13,052	53.6
Vellinge	89.0	10.0	21,108	14,439	68.4	6,669	31.6
Ystad	82.6	8.2	17,418	8,640	49.6	8,778	50.4
Total	84.6	3.7	211,621	114,840	54.3	96,781	45.7
Source: val.se

==== Skåne W ====
Location	Turnout	Share	Votes	Yes	%	No	%
Bjuv	78.7	5.0	8,168	3,367	41.2	4,801	58.8
Eslöv	80.7	10.7	17,684	7,485	42.3	10,199	57.7
Helsingborg	79.8	45.8	75,458	41,204	54.6	34,254	45.4
Höganäs	85.2	9.3	15,242	8,724	57.2	6,518	42.8
Hörby	80.5	5.2	8,623	3,064	35.5	5,559	64.5
Höör	81.5	5.3	8,730	3,672	41.2	5,058	56.7
Landskrona	76.9	13.9	22,960	11,831	51.5	11,129	48.5
Svalöv	83.4	4.8	7,867	3,201	40.7	4,666	59.3
Total	80.2	2.9	164,732	82,548	50.1	82,184	49.9
Source: val.se

=== Stockholm ===
==== Stockholm ====
Location	Turnout	Share	Votes	Yes	%	No	%
Stockholm	79.6	100.0	487,723	279,842	57.4	207,881	42.6
Total	79.6	8.5	487,723	279,842	57.4	207,881	42.6
Source: val.se

==== Stockholm County ====
Location	Turnout	Share	Votes	Yes	%	No	%
Botkyrka	72.7	5.9	39,834	20,071	50.4	19,763	49.6
Danderyd	86.9	2.9	19,792	15,112	76.4	4,680	23.6
Ekerö	87.7	2.1	14,404	7,965	55.3	6,439	44.7
Haninge	80.5	6.3	42,651	20,556	48.2	22,095	51.8
Huddinge	80.2	7.6	50,841	26,947	53.0	23,894	47.0
Järfälla	83.4	5.8	39,051	21,252	54.4	17,799	45.6
Lidingö	86.2	4.1	27,646	19,441	70.3	8,205	29.7
Nacka	83.7	7.2	48,215	29,815	61.8	18,400	38.2
Norrtälje	82.4	5.1	34,197	13,598	39.8	20,599	60.2
Nykvarn	85.3	0.7	5,011	2,332	46.5	2,679	53.5
Nynäshamn	82.6	2.3	15,272	6,290	41.2	8,982	58.8
Salem	85.7	1.3	8,456	4,372	51.7	4,084	48.3
Sigtuna	78.3	3.1	21,064	10,598	50.3	10,466	49.7
Sollentuna	84.3	5.5	36,725	22,224	60.5	14,501	39.5
Solna	79.8	5.7	38,542	22,071	57.3	16,471	42.7
Sundbyberg	78.8	3.2	21,489	11,239	52.3	10,250	47.7
Södertälje	76.4	6.8	45,739	21,903	47.9	23,836	52.1
Tyresö	85.0	3.6	24,389	13,099	53.7	11,290	46.3
Täby	86.7	5.9	39,577	26,899	68.0	12,678	32.0
Upplands-Bro	81.7	1.9	12,785	6,199	48.5	6,586	51.5
Upplands Väsby	81.3	3.4	23,018	12,136	52.7	10,882	47.3
Vallentuna	85.0	2.4	16,011	8,286	51.8	7,725	48.2
Vaxholm	86.7	0.9	6,093	3,486	57.2	2,607	42.8
Värmdö	84.7	3.0	19,915	10,246	51.4	9,669	48.6
Österåker	85.3	3.3	22,439	12,540	55.9	9,899	44.1
Total	81.8	11.8	673,156	368,677	54.8	304,479	45.2
Source: val.se

=== Södermanland ===
Location	Turnout	Share	Votes	Yes	%	No	%
Eskilstuna	80.6	33.9	56,106	25,215	44.9	30,891	55.1
Flen	82.7	6.3	10,429	4,105	39.4	6,324	60.6
Gnesta	84.8	3.8	6,270	2,533	40.4	3,737	59.6
Katrineholm	83.5	12.5	20,622	8,332	40.4	12,290	59.6
Nyköping	86.0	19.9	32,810	15,212	46.4	17,598	53.6
Oxelösund	84.2	4.5	7,526	3,283	43.6	4,243	56.4
Strängnäs	84.5	11.6	19,249	9,146	47.5	10,103	52.5
Trosa	85.3	4.0	6,699	3,280	49.0	3,419	51.0
Vingåker	85.8	3.6	5,912	2,075	35.1	3,837	64.9
Total	83.3	2.9	165,623	73,181	44.2	92,442	55.8
Source: val.se

=== Uppsala ===
Location	Turnout	Share	Votes	Yes	%	No	%
Enköping	82.3	12.3	23,553	10,427	44.3	13,126	55.7
Håbo	85.4	5.8	11,129	5,640	50.7	5,489	49.3
Knivsta	86.5	4.1	7,802	3,873	49.6	3,929	50.4
Tierp	83.0	6.7	12,831	3,846	30.0	8,985	70.0
Uppsala	83.9	60.8	116,288	55,861	48.0	60,427	52.0
Älvkarleby	83.7	3.1	5,858	1,812	30.9	4,046	69.1
Östhammar	83.5	7.2	13,861	4,778	34.5	9,083	65.5
Total	83.8	3.4	191,322	86,237	45.1	105,085	54.9
Source: val.se

=== Värmland ===
Location	Turnout	Share	Votes	Yes	%	No	%
Arvika	81.6	9.4	16,792	4,773	28.4	12,019	71.6
Eda	76.8	2.9	5,279	1,276	24.2	4,003	75.8
Filipstad	82.7	4.1	7,334	1,793	24.4	5,541	75.6
Forshaga	85.5	4.0	7,250	2,203	30.4	5,047	69.6
Grums	82.6	3.4	6,012	1,700	28.3	4,312	71.7
Hagfors	83.3	5.1	9,185	2,250	24.5	6,935	75.5
Hammarö	87.6	5.2	9,243	4,086	44.2	5,157	55.8
Karlstad	84.9	30.6	54,632	23,919	43.8	30,713	56.2
Kil	85.4	4.2	7,605	2,450	32.2	5,155	67.8
Kristinehamn	83.1	8.8	15,698	5,099	32.5	10,599	67.5
Munkfors	84.6	1.5	2,762	658	23.8	2,104	76.2
Storfors	86.2	1.7	3,062	883	28.8	2,179	71.2
Sunne	84.0	4.9	8,865	2,449	27.6	6,416	72.4
Säffle	83.2	5.9	10,610	3,287	31.0	7,323	69.0
Torsby	81.6	4.9	8,726	1,915	21.9	6,811	78.1
Årjäng	78.7	3.4	6,037	1,482	24.5	4,555	75.5
Total	83.6	3.1	179,092	60,223	33.6	118,869	66.4
Source: val.se

=== Västerbotten ===
Location	Turnout	Share	Votes	Yes	%	No	%
Bjurholm	83.5	1.0	1,734	362	20.9	1,372	79.1
Dorotea	81.3	1.2	2,076	309	14.9	1,767	85.1
Lycksele	84.1	5.0	8,357	1,566	18.7	6,791	81.3
Malå	86.3	1.4	2,387	413	17.3	1,974	82.7
Nordmaling	83.6	2.9	4,912	1,072	21.8	3,840	78.2
Norsjö	86.0	1.8	3,042	485	15.9	2,557	84.1
Robertsfors	85.8	2.8	4,643	975	21.0	3,668	79.0
Skellefteå	86.1	28.5	48,005	12,025	25.0	35,980	75.0
Sorsele	81.2	1.2	1,938	305	15.7	1,633	84.3
Storuman	84.2	2.7	4,475	783	17.5	3,692	82.5
Umeå	85.7	41.8	70,463	23,494	33.3	46,969	66.7
Vilhelmina	83.9	3.0	4,991	736	14.7	4,255	85.3
Vindeln	83.3	2.3	3,854	739	19.2	3,115	80.8
Vännäs	83.4	3.1	5,295	1,167	22.0	4,128	78.0
Åsele	82.9	1.3	2,271	408	18.0	1,863	82.0
Total	85.3	2.9	168,443	44,839	26.6	123,604	73.4
Source: val.se

=== Västernorrland ===
Location	Turnout	Share	Votes	Yes	%	No	%
Härnösand	83.4	10.3	16,506	5,619	34.0	10,887	66.0
Kramfors	83.3	8.5	13,704	3,433	25.1	10,271	74.9
Sollefteå	83.3	8.7	14,028	3,148	22.4	10,880	77.6
Sundsvall	83.8	38.3	61,451	20,956	34.1	40,495	65.9
Timrå	83.3	7.1	11,405	3,002	26.3	8,403	73.7
Ånge	82.8	4.4	7,119	1,258	17.7	5,861	82.3
Örnsköldsvik	84.8	22.7	36,410	11,295	31.0	25,115	69.0
Total	83.8	2.8	160,623	48,711	30.3	111,912	69.7
Source: val.se

=== Västmanland ===
Location	Turnout	Share	Votes	Yes	%	No	%
Arboga	83.8	5.3	8,763	3,029	34.6	5,734	65.4
Fagersta	82.5	4.9	8,098	2,806	34.7	5,292	65.3
Hallstahammar	80.9	5.6	9,311	3,888	41.8	5,423	58.2
Heby	83.1	5.1	8,506	2,280	26.8	6,226	73.2
Kungsör	84.7	3.2	5,325	2,029	38.1	3,296	61.9
Köping	81.7	9.5	15,693	5,558	35.4	10,135	64.6
Norberg	83.6	2.3	3,845	1,091	28.4	2,754	71.6
Sala	83.9	8.4	13,907	4,587	33.0	9,320	67.0
Skinnskatteberg	81.9	1.9	3,060	910	29.7	2,150	70.3
Surahammar	83.4	3.9	6,424	2,571	40.0	3,853	60.0
Västerås	82.3	49.8	82,382	40,661	49.4	41,721	50.6
Total	82.6	2.9	165,314	69,410	42.0	95,904	58.0
Source: val.se

=== Västra Götaland ===
==== Gothenburg ====
Location	Turnout	Share	Votes	Yes	%	No	%
Gothenburg	78.5	100.0	299,231	143,296	47.9	155,935	52.1
Total	78.5	5.2	299,231	143,296	47.9	155,935	52.1
Source: val.se

==== Västra Götaland E ====
Location	Turnout	Share	Votes	Yes	%	No	%
Essunga	84.6	2.3	3,700	1,149	31.1	2,551	68.9
Falköping	84.2	12.1	19,833	6,376	32.1	13,457	67.9
Grästorp	84.9	2.3	3,754	1,313	35.0	2,441	65.0
Gullspång	84.4	2.3	3,758	912	24.3	2,846	75.7
Götene	86.0	5.2	8,432	2,973	35.3	5,459	64.7
Hjo	83.4	3.5	5,692	2,280	40.1	3,412	59.9
Karlsborg	86.2	2.9	4,664	1,651	35.4	3,013	64.6
Lidköping	84.3	14.6	23,806	9,089	38.2	14,717	61.8
Mariestad	84.0	9.5	15,434	5,544	35.9	9,890	64.1
Skara	82.6	7.1	11,516	4,520	39.2	6,996	60.8
Skövde	83.9	19.6	31,940	14,389	45.1	17,551	54.9
Tibro	83.4	4.1	6,674	2,433	36.5	4,241	63.5
Tidaholm	84.8	5.0	8,094	2,539	31.4	5,555	68.6
Töreboda	82.7	3.6	5,930	1,700	28.7	4,230	71.3
Vara	82.1	6.2	10,074	3,610	35.8	6,464	64.2
Total	84.0	2.9	163,301	60,478	37.0	102,823	63.0
Source:val.se

==== Västra Götaland N ====
Location	Turnout	Share	Votes	Yes	%	No	%
Ale	84.2	9.6	16,136	6,057	37.5	10,079	62.5
Alingsås	86.2	13.8	23,201	8,608	37.1	14,593	62.9
Bengtsfors	82.0	4.0	6,817	1,850	27.1	4,967	72.9
Dals-Ed	80.5	1.9	3,166	845	26.7	2,321	73.3
Färgelanda	84.2	2.6	4,408	1,108	25.1	3,300	74.9
Herrljunga	85.2	3.6	6,108	1,813	29.7	4,295	70.3
Lerum	87.3	13.4	22,569	10,332	45.8	12,237	54.2
Lilla Edet	80.5	4.7	7,887	2,532	32.1	5,355	67.9
Mellerud	82.2	3.8	6,201	1,715	27.7	4,486	72.3
Trollhättan	82.5	19.9	33,459	14,365	42.9	19,094	57.1
Vårgårda	86.0	4.0	6,752	2,010	29.8	4,742	70.2
Vänersborg	84.2	14.1	23,677	8,468	35.8	15,209	64.2
Åmål	81.7	4.8	8,109	2,527	31.2	5,582	68.8
Total	84.1	2.9	168,490	62,230	36.9	106,260	63.1
Source: val.se

==== Västra Götaland S ====
Location	Turnout	Share	Votes	Yes	%	No	%
Bollebygd	86.6	4.4	5,099	1,853	36.3	3,246	63.7
Borås	82.0	53.2	62,306	25,587	41.1	36,719	58.9
Mark	84.3	18.0	21,046	7,077	33.6	13,969	66.4
Svenljunga	82.6	5.6	6,539	2,124	32.5	4,415	67.5
Tranemo	84.7	6.5	7,607	2,918	38.4	4,689	61.6
Ulricehamn	85.2	12.4	14,556	5,112	35.1	9,444	64.9
Total	83.2	2.1	117,153	44,671	37.6	72,482	62.4
Source: val.se

==== Västra Götaland W ====
Location	Turnout	Share	Votes	Yes	%	No	%
Härryda	86.8	9.2	19,437	9,074	46.7	10,363	53.3
Kungälv	86.3	11.7	24,643	9,866	40.0	14,777	60.0
Lysekil	82.7	4.6	9,680	3,704	38.3	5,976	61.7
Munkedal	82.4	3.1	6,637	1,767	26.6	4,870	73.4
Mölndal	84.1	17.3	36,424	16,802	46.1	19,622	53.9
Orust	84.4	4.7	9,845	3,495	35.5	6,350	64.5
Partille	84.8	9.8	20,633	9,713	47.1	10,920	52.9
Sotenäs	82.6	3.0	6,249	2,673	42.8	3,576	57.2
Stenungsund	84.7	6.6	13,981	6,014	43.0	7,967	57.0
Strömstad	73.8	3.2	6,657	2,329	35.0	4,328	65.0
Tanum	82.6	3.7	7,898	2,546	32.2	5,352	67.8
Tjörn	85.6	4.6	9,714	4,082	42.0	5,632	58.0
Uddevalla	82.2	14.9	31,329	12,213	39.0	19,116	61.0
Öckerö	86.4	3.7	7,785	3,146	40.4	4,639	59.6
Total	84.0	3.7	210,912	87,424	41.5	123,488	58.5
Source: val.se

=== Örebro ===
Location	Turnout	Share	Votes	Yes	%	No	%
Askersund	85.5	4.4	7,740	2,320	30.0	5,420	70.0
Degerfors	84.1	3.8	6,702	2,154	32.1	4,548	67.9
Hallsberg	85.0	5.8	10,158	3,239	31.9	6,919	68.1
Hällefors	81.0	2.8	4,916	1,606	32.7	3,310	67.3
Karlskoga	82.9	11.6	19,929	8,113	40.7	11,816	59.3
Kumla	85.1	6.9	12,170	4,231	34.8	7,939	65.2
Laxå	83.5	2.4	4,173	1,293	31.0	2,880	69.0
Lekeberg	85.9	2.6	4,608	1,350	29.3	3,258	70.7
Lindesberg	83.3	8.5	14,992	5,194	34.6	9,798	65.4
Ljusnarsberg	80.5	2.0	3,480	1,007	28.9	2,473	71.1
Nora	83.8	3.8	6,774	2,166	32.0	4,608	68.0
Örebro	83.4	45.8	80,752	33,732	41.8	47,020	58.2
Total	83.6	3.1	176,394	66,405	37.6	109,989	62.4
Source: val.se

=== Östergötland ===
Location	Turnout	Share	Votes	Yes	%	No	%
Boxholm	86.3	1.3	3,441	960	27.9	2,481	72.1
Finspång	86.0	5.3	14,128	5,273	37.3	8,855	62.7
Kinda	85.4	2.4	6,425	1,916	29.8	4,509	70.2
Linköping	85.7	33.1	89,005	40,377	45.4	48,628	54.6
Mjölby	84.9	6.0	16,225	5,720	35.3	10,505	64.7
Motala	83.8	10.0	26,856	10,211	38.0	16,645	62.0
Norrköping	82.5	29.4	79,025	32,191	40.7	46,834	59.3
Söderköping	86.7	3.4	9,153	3,376	36.9	5,777	63.1
Vadstena	85.4	1.9	5,039	2,134	42.3	2,905	57.7
Valdemarsvik	85.1	2.0	5,503	1,695	30.8	3,808	69.2
Ydre	89.0	1.0	2,701	752	27.8	1,949	72.2
Åtvidaberg	86.2	2.9	7,701	2,401	31.2	5,300	68.8
Ödeshög	84.7	1.3	3,593	1,064	29.6	2,529	70.4
Total	84.6	4.7	268,795	108,070	40.2	160,725	59.8
Source: val.se
