= Results of the 2019 European Parliament election in Sweden =

Sweden held its European Parliament election on 26 May 2019 in the same week as 27 other countries to fill Sweden's 20 seats in the parliament.

== Results ==
| Party | Votes | % | Seats | +/– |
|---|---|---|---|---|
| Swedish Social Democratic Party | 974,589 | 23.48 | 5 | 0 |
| Moderate Party | 698,770 | 16.83 | 4 | +1 |
| Sweden Democrats | 636,877 | 15.34 | 3 | +1 |
| Green Party | 478,258 | 11.52 | 2 | –2 |
| Centre Party | 447,641 | 10.78 | 2 | +1 |
| Christian Democrats | 357,856 | 8.62 | 2 | +1 |
| Left Party | 282,300 | 6.80 | 1 | 0 |
| Liberals | 171,419 | 4.13 | 1 | –1 |
| Feminist Initiative | 32,143 | 0.77 | 0 | –1 |
| Pirate Party | 26,526 | 0.64 | 0 | 0 |
| Alternative for Sweden | 19,178 | 0.46 | 0 | New |
| Citizens' Coalition | 6,363 | 0.15 | 0 | New |
| Turning Point Party | 5,171 | 0.12 | 0 | New |
| Animals' Party | 4,105 | 0.10 | 0 | 0 |
| Independent Rural Party | 2,059 | 0.05 | 0 | New |
| Christian Values Party | 1,596 | 0.04 | 0 | New |
| Direct Democrats | 1,276 | 0.03 | 0 | New |
| Communist Party | 974 | 0.02 | 0 | New |
| We Social Conservatives | 715 | 0.02 | 0 | New |
| Classical Liberal Party | 702 | 0.02 | 0 | 0 |
| Basic Income Party | 213 | 0.01 | 0 | New |
| Scania Party | 117 | 0.00 | 0 | New |
| Sweden out of the EU / Freedom and Justice Party | 103 | 0.00 | 0 | 0 |
| Security Party | 53 | 0.00 | 0 | New |
| New Reform | 50 | 0.00 | 0 | New |
| Common Sense in Sweden | 33 | 0.00 | 0 | New |
| European Workers Party | 29 | 0.00 | 0 | 0 |
| Solens Frihetsparti | 19 | 0.00 | 0 | New |
| BRP | 8 | 0.00 | 0 | New |
| The New Party | 7 | 0.00 | 0 | New |
| Electoral Cooperation Party | 3 | 0.00 | 0 | New |
| Kustkult | 2 | 0.00 | 0 | New |
| Parties not on the ballot | 2,315 | 0.06 | 0 | – |
| Total | 4,151,470 | 100.00 | 20 | 0 |
| Valid votes | 4,151,470 | 99.13 | | |
| Invalid/blank votes | 36,378 | 0.87 | | |
| Total votes | 4,187,848 | 100.00 | | |
| Registered voters/turnout | 7,576,917 | 55.27 | | |
Source: Val

=== By European parliamentary group ===
| EPP | S&D | RE | ECR | G–EFA | GUE/NGL | ID | Non-inscrits |
|---|---|---|---|---|---|---|---|
| 6 | 5 | 3 | 3 | 2 | 1 | 0 | 0 |

== Results by county ==
The Swedish results are counted by county only, since the seats are shared on a national basis, resulting in eight fewer counting areas than in Riksdag elections.

=== Percentage share ===
| Location | Land | Turnout | Share | Votes | S | M | SD | MP | C | KD | V | L | F! | Other |
|---|---|---|---|---|---|---|---|---|---|---|---|---|---|---|
| Blekinge | G | 52.6 | 1.5 | 62,275 | 27.6 | 15.3 | 22.5 | 7.7 | 8.6 | 8.2 | 5.1 | 2.9 | 0.5 | 1.6 |
| Dalarna | S | 53.1 | 2.8 | 114,532 | 26.2 | 13.6 | 19.3 | 8.8 | 13.6 | 7.7 | 6.3 | 2.3 | 0.6 | 1.7 |
| Gotland | G | 54.7 | 0.6 | 25,620 | 24.8 | 12.3 | 11.1 | 13.2 | 19.1 | 6.1 | 8.1 | 2.6 | 1.4 | 1.4 |
| Gävleborg | N | 49.8 | 2.6 | 107,597 | 29.2 | 13.8 | 18.7 | 8.7 | 11.1 | 6.7 | 7.2 | 2.7 | 0.6 | 1.4 |
| Halland | G | 56.8 | 3.4 | 139,635 | 21.4 | 20.5 | 16.8 | 9.7 | 12.1 | 9.7 | 4.0 | 3.8 | 0.5 | 1.6 |
| Jämtland | N | 51.5 | 1.2 | 50,695 | 28.7 | 11.3 | 14.5 | 10.7 | 16.9 | 6.3 | 7.3 | 2.1 | 0.7 | 1.5 |
| Jönköping | G | 54.8 | 3.5 | 143,693 | 22.9 | 14.9 | 17.2 | 9.6 | 12.2 | 15.1 | 4.0 | 2.6 | 0.4 | 1.2 |
| Kalmar | G | 53.5 | 2.4 | 98,007 | 26.4 | 14.4 | 18.8 | 8.5 | 12.1 | 10.2 | 5.1 | 2.4 | 0.5 | 1.6 |
| Kronoberg | G | 54.4 | 1.9 | 77,683 | 25.4 | 16.2 | 18.0 | 9.3 | 11.0 | 10.5 | 5.3 | 2.4 | 0.5 | 1.3 |
| Norrbotten | N | 50.4 | 2.3 | 97,060 | 38.0 | 10.6 | 14.7 | 8.0 | 8.5 | 6.5 | 9.3 | 2.1 | 0.7 | 1.7 |
| Skåne | G | 54.4 | 13.0 | 539,231 | 20.8 | 18.2 | 20.2 | 10.5 | 8.8 | 8.3 | 5.7 | 4.9 | 0.8 | 1.8 |
| Stockholm | S | 59.4 | 23.9 | 991,067 | 18.7 | 20.5 | 11.0 | 14.7 | 11.0 | 7.7 | 7.7 | 5.9 | 1.0 | 1.9 |
| Södermanland | S | 52.4 | 2.7 | 111,715 | 27.6 | 16.9 | 17.3 | 10.0 | 9.9 | 7.5 | 5.7 | 3.0 | 0.6 | 1.5 |
| Uppsala | S | 58.9 | 3.9 | 163,084 | 21.5 | 15.9 | 13.0 | 14.7 | 11.9 | 8.5 | 7.1 | 4.4 | 0.9 | 2.0 |
| Värmland | S | 51.5 | 2.6 | 109,194 | 29.0 | 14.1 | 16.8 | 9.3 | 11.3 | 8.4 | 6.2 | 2.9 | 0.6 | 1.4 |
| Västerbotten | N | 54.9 | 2.7 | 112,480 | 34.9 | 9.8 | 9.6 | 10.8 | 12.1 | 6.6 | 10.7 | 2.8 | 0.9 | 1.7 |
| Västernorrland | N | 51.9 | 2.3 | 96,526 | 35.9 | 10.6 | 14.1 | 8.2 | 11.8 | 7.9 | 7.0 | 2.3 | 0.6 | 1.6 |
| Västmanland | S | 50.3 | 2.4 | 101,280 | 26.7 | 17.7 | 17.7 | 8.7 | 10.3 | 7.8 | 5.7 | 3.4 | 0.5 | 1.5 |
| Västra Götaland | G | 55.5 | 16.9 | 701,398 | 21.9 | 16.2 | 15.3 | 12.0 | 10.0 | 9.9 | 7.8 | 4.1 | 0.9 | 1.8 |
| Örebro | S | 53.4 | 2.9 | 120,081 | 28.6 | 13.4 | 16.3 | 10.8 | 9.9 | 8.9 | 6.3 | 3.5 | 0.7 | 1.6 |
| Östergötland | G | 54.7 | 4.5 | 188,617 | 24.0 | 17.5 | 15.4 | 11.1 | 11.6 | 8.9 | 5.5 | 3.5 | 0.6 | 1.9 |
| Total | | 55.3 | 100.0 | 4,154,470 | 23.5 | 16.8 | 15.3 | 11.5 | 10.8 | 8.6 | 6.8 | 4.1 | 0.8 | 1.7 |
Source: val.se

=== By votes ===
| Location | Land | Turnout | Share | Votes | S | M | SD | MP | C | KD | V | L | F! | Other |
|---|---|---|---|---|---|---|---|---|---|---|---|---|---|---|
| Blekinge | G | 52.6 | 1.5 | 62,275 | 17,192 | 9,526 | 13,990 | 4,809 | 5,356 | 5,121 | 3,163 | 1,823 | 283 | 1,012 |
| Dalarna | S | 53.1 | 2.8 | 114,532 | 30,020 | 15,583 | 22,072 | 10,046 | 15,555 | 8,796 | 7,170 | 2,605 | 715 | 1,970 |
| Gotland | G | 54.7 | 0.6 | 25,620 | 6,352 | 3,155 | 2,833 | 3,381 | 4,891 | 1,554 | 2,076 | 664 | 365 | 349 |
| Gävleborg | N | 49.8 | 2.6 | 107,597 | 31,463 | 14,799 | 20,148 | 9,408 | 11,907 | 7,194 | 7,722 | 2,866 | 602 | 1,488 |
| Halland | G | 56.8 | 3.4 | 139,635 | 29,933 | 28,638 | 23,411 | 13,497 | 16,963 | 13,511 | 5,549 | 5,264 | 664 | 2,205 |
| Jämtland | N | 51.5 | 1.2 | 50,695 | 14,570 | 5,718 | 7,334 | 5,444 | 8,571 | 3,171 | 3,718 | 1,071 | 347 | 751 |
| Jönköping | G | 54.8 | 3.5 | 143,693 | 32,944 | 21,376 | 24,664 | 13,776 | 17,497 | 21,752 | 5,731 | 3,699 | 558 | 1,696 |
| Kalmar | G | 53.5 | 2.4 | 98,007 | 25,878 | 14,106 | 18,380 | 8,338 | 11,882 | 10,014 | 4,974 | 2,314 | 507 | 1,614 |
| Kronoberg | G | 54.4 | 1.9 | 77,683 | 19,748 | 12,597 | 14,005 | 7,205 | 8,559 | 8,143 | 4,129 | 1,862 | 400 | 1,035 |
| Norrbotten | N | 50.4 | 2.3 | 97,060 | 36,839 | 10,302 | 14,245 | 7,766 | 8,289 | 6,282 | 9,069 | 1,997 | 668 | 1,603 |
| Skåne | G | 54.4 | 13.0 | 539,231 | 112,155 | 98,260 | 108,941 | 56,591 | 47,446 | 44,682 | 30,540 | 26,682 | 4,410 | 9,524 |
| Stockholm | S | 59.4 | 23.9 | 991,067 | 185,495 | 202,954 | 109,479 | 145,518 | 108,602 | 75,970 | 76,478 | 58,553 | 9,480 | 18,538 |
| Södermanland | S | 52.4 | 2.7 | 111,715 | 30,824 | 18,854 | 19,288 | 11,198 | 11,070 | 8,417 | 6,368 | 3,366 | 653 | 1,677 |
| Uppsala | S | 58.9 | 3.9 | 163,084 | 35,117 | 25,924 | 21,189 | 24,014 | 19,362 | 13,931 | 11,657 | 7,163 | 1,398 | 3,329 |
| Värmland | S | 51.5 | 2.6 | 109,194 | 31,689 | 15,344 | 18,365 | 10,114 | 12,346 | 9,123 | 6,805 | 3,152 | 673 | 1,583 |
| Västerbotten | N | 54.9 | 2.7 | 112,480 | 39,267 | 11,053 | 10,805 | 12,204 | 13,643 | 7,441 | 12,070 | 3,100 | 1,005 | 1,892 |
| Västernorrland | N | 51.9 | 2.3 | 96,526 | 34,696 | 10,186 | 13,651 | 7,958 | 11,372 | 7,608 | 6,749 | 2,212 | 568 | 1,526 |
| Västmanland | S | 50.3 | 2.4 | 101,280 | 26,998 | 17,909 | 17,918 | 8,797 | 10,467 | 7,857 | 5,794 | 3,461 | 510 | 1,569 |
| Västra Götaland | G | 55.5 | 16.9 | 701,398 | 153,883 | 113,294 | 107,466 | 84,240 | 70,090 | 69,678 | 54,671 | 28,859 | 6,419 | 12,798 |
| Örebro | S | 53.4 | 2.9 | 120,081 | 34,294 | 16,132 | 19,593 | 13,015 | 11,879 | 10,741 | 7,582 | 4,143 | 783 | 1,919 |
| Östergötland | G | 54.7 | 4.5 | 188,617 | 45,232 | 33,060 | 29,100 | 20,939 | 21,894 | 16,870 | 10,285 | 6,563 | 1,135 | 3,539 |
| Total | | 55.3 | 100.0 | 4,154,470 | 974,589 | 698,770 | 636,877 | 478,258 | 447,641 | 357,856 | 282,300 | 171,419 | 32,143 | 71,617 |
Source: val.se

== Results by municipality ==
=== Blekinge ===
| Location | Turnout | Share | Votes | S | M | SD | MP | C | KD | V | L | F! | Other |
|---|---|---|---|---|---|---|---|---|---|---|---|---|---|
| Karlshamn | 51.0 | 20.0 | 12,476 | 28.0 | 15.0 | 22.3 | 8.8 | 8.2 | 7.7 | 5.5 | 2.6 | 0.5 | 1.4 |
| Karlskrona | 55.4 | 44.0 | 27,427 | 27.1 | 16.7 | 18.9 | 8.6 | 9.1 | 8.7 | 4.9 | 3.6 | 0.5 | 1.8 |
| Olofström | 46.5 | 7.4 | 4,598 | 32.6 | 10.2 | 27.4 | 5.8 | 7.7 | 7.5 | 5.2 | 1.5 | 0.4 | 1.4 |
| Ronneby | 51.6 | 17.5 | 10,929 | 25.8 | 14.5 | 25.6 | 6.5 | 9.2 | 8.1 | 5.8 | 2.4 | 0.3 | 1.7 |
| Sölvesborg | 51.0 | 11.0 | 6,845 | 28.6 | 14.9 | 28.6 | 5.4 | 6.9 | 7.8 | 3.7 | 2.6 | 0.4 | 1.2 |
| Total | 52.6 | 1.5 | 62,275 | 27.6 | 15.3 | 22.5 | 7.7 | 8.6 | 8.2 | 5.1 | 2.9 | 0.5 | 1.6 |
Source: val.se

=== Dalarna ===
| Location | Turnout | Share | Votes | S | M | SD | MP | C | KD | V | L | F! | Other |
|---|---|---|---|---|---|---|---|---|---|---|---|---|---|
| Avesta | 49.5 | 7.3 | 8,357 | 31.9 | 12.6 | 22.5 | 6.3 | 9.6 | 7.3 | 5.3 | 2.1 | 0.6 | 1.8 |
| Borlänge | 51.7 | 16.9 | 19,413 | 29.3 | 13.6 | 19.0 | 9.3 | 10.9 | 6.4 | 6.5 | 3.0 | 0.5 | 1.5 |
| Falun | 58.0 | 22.7 | 25,965 | 23.2 | 16.1 | 13.6 | 11.8 | 16.2 | 6.9 | 7.3 | 2.6 | 0.7 | 1.6 |
| Gagnef | 55.8 | 3.8 | 4,354 | 20.6 | 11.7 | 19.5 | 5.4 | 22.2 | 9.7 | 5.4 | 1.6 | 0.7 | 1.4 |
| Hedemora | 49.8 | 5.0 | 5,743 | 25.5 | 12.6 | 22.2 | 7.1 | 12.7 | 8.9 | 7.1 | 1.4 | 0.6 | 2.0 |
| Leksand | 57.8 | 6.2 | 7,093 | 22.0 | 15.0 | 15.4 | 10.1 | 16.1 | 10.8 | 6.2 | 2.4 | 0.8 | 1.2 |
| Ludvika | 50.2 | 8.5 | 9,737 | 32.3 | 11.7 | 21.4 | 8.2 | 9.5 | 6.0 | 6.5 | 2.4 | 0.5 | 1.6 |
| Malung-Sälen | 52.3 | 3.5 | 4,065 | 24.0 | 17.1 | 23.9 | 5.5 | 11.6 | 8.4 | 5.2 | 2.3 | 0.5 | 1.5 |
| Mora | 51.6 | 7.2 | 8,236 | 23.7 | 13.0 | 21.7 | 8.4 | 14.1 | 8.9 | 5.3 | 2.1 | 0.7 | 2.3 |
| Orsa | 52.8 | 2.4 | 2,798 | 23.1 | 10.3 | 26.4 | 7.2 | 12.8 | 8.5 | 6.6 | 2.2 | 0.9 | 2.2 |
| Rättvik | 54.2 | 4.2 | 4,758 | 22.0 | 13.9 | 22.0 | 8.9 | 14.7 | 9.4 | 4.5 | 2.1 | 0.5 | 2.1 |
| Smedjebacken | 49.7 | 3.7 | 4,201 | 34.4 | 11.5 | 21.0 | 7.1 | 9.7 | 6.1 | 6.1 | 1.2 | 0.6 | 2.2 |
| Säter | 54.4 | 4.1 | 4,666 | 27.7 | 12.3 | 20.1 | 6.7 | 16.2 | 7.5 | 5.7 | 1.5 | 0.5 | 1.7 |
| Vansbro | 47.9 | 2.2 | 2,485 | 23.3 | 10.2 | 21.6 | 4.7 | 19.0 | 11.3 | 6.8 | 1.0 | 0.3 | 1.8 |
| Älvdalen | 48.8 | 2.3 | 2,661 | 23.0 | 13.6 | 29.6 | 5.2 | 13.6 | 9.1 | 4.6 | 1.6 | 0.5 | 2.9 |
| Total | 53.1 | 2.8 | 114,532 | 26.2 | 13.6 | 19.3 | 8.8 | 13.6 | 7.7 | 6.3 | 2.3 | 0.6 | 1.7 |
Source: val.se

=== Gotland ===
| Location | Turnout | Share | Votes | S | M | SD | MP | C | KD | V | L | F! | Other |
|---|---|---|---|---|---|---|---|---|---|---|---|---|---|
| Gotland | 54.7 | 100.0 | 25,620 | 24.8 | 12.3 | 11.1 | 13.2 | 19.1 | 6.1 | 8.1 | 2.6 | 1.4 | 1.4 |
| Total | 54.7 | 0.6 | 25,620 | 24.8 | 12.3 | 11.1 | 13.2 | 19.1 | 6.1 | 8.1 | 2.6 | 1.4 | 1.4 |
Source: val.se

=== Gävleborg ===
| Location | Turnout | Share | Votes | S | M | SD | MP | C | KD | V | L | F! | Other |
|---|---|---|---|---|---|---|---|---|---|---|---|---|---|
| Bollnäs | 48.7 | 9.1 | 9,810 | 29.3 | 12.8 | 19.1 | 7.5 | 13.7 | 6.9 | 6.8 | 1.7 | 0.5 | 1.5 |
| Gävle | 52.7 | 37.4 | 40,289 | 27.4 | 16.9 | 17.7 | 10.7 | 8.1 | 6.3 | 7.1 | 3.6 | 0.7 | 1.4 |
| Hofors | 43.9 | 3.0 | 3,197 | 36.9 | 10.3 | 20.2 | 5.2 | 7.6 | 5.1 | 10.6 | 2.3 | 0.3 | 1.3 |
| Hudiksvall | 50.0 | 13.5 | 14,483 | 29.3 | 11.5 | 16.2 | 9.8 | 14.7 | 6.7 | 7.9 | 1.9 | 0.7 | 1.4 |
| Ljusdal | 46.1 | 6.2 | 6,683 | 26.0 | 12.4 | 19.8 | 8.6 | 15.7 | 6.8 | 6.8 | 2.1 | 0.6 | 1.2 |
| Nordanstig | 45.4 | 3.1 | 3,291 | 27.6 | 8.8 | 22.3 | 6.4 | 13.7 | 8.6 | 8.8 | 1.7 | 0.4 | 1.8 |
| Ockelbo | 45.9 | 1.9 | 2,040 | 29.8 | 10.5 | 25.2 | 6.8 | 12.4 | 6.2 | 6.7 | 0.8 | 0.3 | 1.2 |
| Ovanåker | 46.7 | 3.9 | 4,155 | 26.8 | 11.1 | 17.8 | 5.3 | 18.3 | 13.6 | 4.3 | 1.6 | 0.3 | 1.1 |
| Sandviken | 49.6 | 13.2 | 14,204 | 33.6 | 12.2 | 21.0 | 6.7 | 8.5 | 5.9 | 7.1 | 3.1 | 0.5 | 1.4 |
| Söderhamn | 48.6 | 8.8 | 9,445 | 31.6 | 12.6 | 19.5 | 7.3 | 12.6 | 6.0 | 6.7 | 1.7 | 0.5 | 1.5 |
| Total | 49.8 | 2.6 | 107,597 | 29.2 | 13.8 | 18.7 | 8.7 | 11.1 | 6.7 | 7.2 | 2.7 | 0.6 | 1.4 |
Source: val.se

=== Halland ===
| Location | Turnout | Share | Votes | S | M | SD | MP | C | KD | V | L | F! | Other |
|---|---|---|---|---|---|---|---|---|---|---|---|---|---|
| Falkenberg | 54.3 | 8.9 | 18,361 | 25.2 | 16.1 | 15.9 | 9.4 | 15.4 | 9.0 | 4.1 | 3.1 | 0.5 | 1.3 |
| Halmstad | 53.5 | 19.6 | 40,562 | 24.8 | 19.1 | 16.2 | 10.1 | 10.5 | 8.5 | 4.7 | 3.6 | 0.5 | 1.9 |
| Hylte | 52.1 | 1.8 | 3,738 | 25.8 | 12.3 | 23.1 | 6.0 | 15.6 | 9.6 | 4.0 | 2.0 | 0.2 | 1.5 |
| Kungsbacka | 62.1 | 18.6 | 38,323 | 13.9 | 25.7 | 17.1 | 10.2 | 11.3 | 12.1 | 3.0 | 4.8 | 0.4 | 1.5 |
| Laholm | 53.8 | 4.9 | 10,139 | 19.0 | 16.1 | 23.8 | 7.8 | 14.7 | 10.4 | 3.3 | 2.9 | 0.6 | 1.6 |
| Varberg | 58.6 | 13.8 | 28,512 | 24.6 | 21.0 | 14.2 | 9.7 | 12.2 | 8.2 | 4.5 | 3.5 | 0.4 | 1.5 |
| Total | 56.8 | 3.4 | 139,635 | 21.4 | 20.5 | 16.8 | 9.7 | 12.1 | 9.7 | 4.0 | 3.8 | 0.5 | 1.6 |
Source: val.se

=== Jämtland ===
| Location | Turnout | Share | Votes | S | M | SD | MP | C | KD | V | L | F! | Other |
|---|---|---|---|---|---|---|---|---|---|---|---|---|---|
| Berg | 46.7 | 5.0 | 2,512 | 28.0 | 11.6 | 18.4 | 7.7 | 18.6 | 5.9 | 6.7 | 1.2 | 0.7 | 1.2 |
| Bräcke | 43.5 | 4.2 | 2,115 | 34.5 | 9.5 | 19.1 | 6.3 | 16.3 | 4.5 | 6.5 | 1.7 | 0.5 | 1.0 |
| Härjedalen | 46.1 | 7.2 | 3,655 | 29.7 | 10.6 | 17.8 | 6.0 | 14.1 | 8.0 | 7.0 | 3.0 | 0.6 | 3.0 |
| Krokom | 53.2 | 11.2 | 5,689 | 26.5 | 10.4 | 14.4 | 9.5 | 21.0 | 7.1 | 7.6 | 1.7 | 0.4 | 1.3 |
| Ragunda | 45.0 | 3.6 | 1,805 | 35.3 | 7.3 | 21.2 | 4.7 | 14.2 | 5.9 | 7.4 | 1.4 | 0.7 | 2.0 |
| Strömsund | 46.2 | 8.1 | 4,084 | 36.3 | 7.4 | 22.2 | 4.2 | 12.7 | 7.0 | 7.8 | 0.8 | 0.4 | 1.2 |
| Åre | 57.5 | 9.5 | 4,831 | 21.6 | 12.8 | 10.8 | 16.8 | 20.9 | 5.9 | 6.3 | 2.3 | 1.0 | 1.5 |
| Östersund | 53.8 | 51.3 | 26,004 | 28.4 | 12.3 | 12.2 | 12.6 | 16.4 | 6.0 | 7.6 | 2.4 | 0.8 | 1.4 |
| Total | 51.5 | 1.2 | 50,695 | 28.7 | 11.3 | 14.5 | 10.7 | 16.9 | 6.3 | 7.3 | 2.1 | 0.7 | 1.5 |
Source: val.se

=== Jönköping ===
| Location | Turnout | Share | Votes | S | M | SD | MP | C | KD | V | L | F! | Other |
|---|---|---|---|---|---|---|---|---|---|---|---|---|---|
| Aneby | | | | | | | | | | | | | |
| Eksjö | | | | | | | | | | | | | |
| Gislaved | | | | | | | | | | | | | |
| Gnosjö | | | | | | | | | | | | | |
| Habo | | | | | | | | | | | | | |
| Jönköping | | | | | | | | | | | | | |
| Mullsjö | | | | | | | | | | | | | |
| Nässjö | | | | | | | | | | | | | |
| Sävsjö | | | | | | | | | | | | | |
| Tranås | | | | | | | | | | | | | |
| Vaggeryd | | | | | | | | | | | | | |
| Vetlanda | | | | | | | | | | | | | |
| Värnamo | | | | | | | | | | | | | |
| Total | 54.8 | 3.5 | 143,693 | 22.9 | 14.9 | 17.2 | 9.6 | 12.2 | 15.1 | 4.0 | 2.6 | 0.4 | 1.2 |
Source: val.se

=== Kalmar ===
| Location | Turnout | Share | Votes | S | M | SD | MP | C | KD | V | L | F! | Other |
|---|---|---|---|---|---|---|---|---|---|---|---|---|---|
| Borgholm | | | | | | | | | | | | | |
| Emmaboda | | | | | | | | | | | | | |
| Hultsfred | | | | | | | | | | | | | |
| Högsby | | | | | | | | | | | | | |
| Kalmar | | | | | | | | | | | | | |
| Mönsterås | | | | | | | | | | | | | |
| Mörbylånga | | | | | | | | | | | | | |
| Nybro | | | | | | | | | | | | | |
| Oskarshamn | | | | | | | | | | | | | |
| Torsås | | | | | | | | | | | | | |
| Vimmerby | | | | | | | | | | | | | |
| Västervik | | | | | | | | | | | | | |
| Total | 53.5 | 2.4 | 98,007 | 26.4 | 14.4 | 18.8 | 8.5 | 12.1 | 10.2 | 5.1 | 2.4 | 0.5 | 1.6 |
Source: val.se

=== Kronoberg ===
| Location | Turnout | Share | Votes | S | M | SD | MP | C | KD | V | L | F! | Other |
|---|---|---|---|---|---|---|---|---|---|---|---|---|---|
| Alvesta | | | | | | | | | | | | | |
| Lessebo | | | | | | | | | | | | | |
| Ljungby | | | | | | | | | | | | | |
| Markaryd | | | | | | | | | | | | | |
| Tingsryd | | | | | | | | | | | | | |
| Uppvidinge | | | | | | | | | | | | | |
| Växjö | | | | | | | | | | | | | |
| Älmhult | | | | | | | | | | | | | |
| Total | 54.4 | 1.9 | 77,683 | 25.4 | 16.2 | 18.0 | 9.3 | 11.0 | 10.5 | 5.3 | 2.4 | 0.5 | 1.3 |
Source: val.se

=== Norrbotten ===
| Location | Turnout | Share | Votes | S | M | SD | MP | C | KD | V | L | F! | Other |
|---|---|---|---|---|---|---|---|---|---|---|---|---|---|
| Arjeplog | | | | | | | | | | | | | |
| Arvidsjaur | | | | | | | | | | | | | |
| Boden | | | | | | | | | | | | | |
| Gällivare | | | | | | | | | | | | | |
| Haparanda | | | | | | | | | | | | | |
| Jokkmokk | | | | | | | | | | | | | |
| Kalix | | | | | | | | | | | | | |
| Kiruna | | | | | | | | | | | | | |
| Luleå | | | | | | | | | | | | | |
| Pajala | | | | | | | | | | | | | |
| Piteå | | | | | | | | | | | | | |
| Älvsbyn | | | | | | | | | | | | | |
| Överkalix | | | | | | | | | | | | | |
| Övertorneå | | | | | | | | | | | | | |
| Total | 50.4 | 2.3 | 97,060 | 38.0 | 10.6 | 14.7 | 8.0 | 8.5 | 6.5 | 9.3 | 2.1 | 0.7 | 1.7 |
Source: val.se

=== Skåne ===
| Location | Turnout | Share | Votes | S | M | SD | MP | C | KD | V | L | F! | Other |
|---|---|---|---|---|---|---|---|---|---|---|---|---|---|
| Bjuv | | | | | | | | | | | | | |
| Bromölla | | | | | | | | | | | | | |
| Burlöv | | | | | | | | | | | | | |
| Båstad | | | | | | | | | | | | | |
| Eslöv | | | | | | | | | | | | | |
| Helsingborg | | | | | | | | | | | | | |
| Hässleholm | | | | | | | | | | | | | |
| Höganäs | | | | | | | | | | | | | |
| Hörby | | | | | | | | | | | | | |
| Höör | | | | | | | | | | | | | |
| Klippan | | | | | | | | | | | | | |
| Kristianstad | | | | | | | | | | | | | |
| Kävlinge | | | | | | | | | | | | | |
| Landskrona | | | | | | | | | | | | | |
| Lomma | | | | | | | | | | | | | |
| Lund | | | | | | | | | | | | | |
| Malmö | | | | | | | | | | | | | |
| Osby | | | | | | | | | | | | | |
| Perstorp | | | | | | | | | | | | | |
| Simrishamn | | | | | | | | | | | | | |
| Sjöbo | | | | | | | | | | | | | |
| Skurup | | | | | | | | | | | | | |
| Staffanstorp | | | | | | | | | | | | | |
| Svalöv | | | | | | | | | | | | | |
| Svedala | | | | | | | | | | | | | |
| Tomelilla | | | | | | | | | | | | | |
| Trelleborg | | | | | | | | | | | | | |
| Vellinge | | | | | | | | | | | | | |
| Ystad | | | | | | | | | | | | | |
| Åstorp | | | | | | | | | | | | | |
| Ängelholm | | | | | | | | | | | | | |
| Örkelljunga | | | | | | | | | | | | | |
| Östra Göinge | | | | | | | | | | | | | |
| Total | 54.4 | 13.0 | 539,231 | 20.8 | 18.2 | 20.2 | 10.5 | 8.8 | 8.3 | 5.7 | 4.9 | 0.8 | 1.8 |
Source: val.se

=== Stockholm ===
| Location | Turnout | Share | Votes | S | M | SD | MP | C | KD | V | L | F! | Other |
|---|---|---|---|---|---|---|---|---|---|---|---|---|---|
| Botkyrka | | | | | | | | | | | | | |
| Danderyd | | | | | | | | | | | | | |
| Ekerö | | | | | | | | | | | | | |
| Haninge | | | | | | | | | | | | | |
| Huddinge | | | | | | | | | | | | | |
| Järfälla | | | | | | | | | | | | | |
| Lidingö | | | | | | | | | | | | | |
| Nacka | | | | | | | | | | | | | |
| Norrtälje | | | | | | | | | | | | | |
| Nykvarn | | | | | | | | | | | | | |
| Nynäshamn | | | | | | | | | | | | | |
| Salem | | | | | | | | | | | | | |
| Sigtuna | | | | | | | | | | | | | |
| Sollentuna | | | | | | | | | | | | | |
| Solna | | | | | | | | | | | | | |
| Stockholm | | | | | | | | | | | | | |
| Sundbyberg | | | | | | | | | | | | | |
| Södertälje | | | | | | | | | | | | | |
| Tyresö | | | | | | | | | | | | | |
| Täby | | | | | | | | | | | | | |
| Upplands-Bro | | | | | | | | | | | | | |
| Upplands Väsby | | | | | | | | | | | | | |
| Vallentuna | | | | | | | | | | | | | |
| Vaxholm | | | | | | | | | | | | | |
| Värmdö | | | | | | | | | | | | | |
| Österåker | | | | | | | | | | | | | |
| Total | 59.4 | 23.9 | 991,067 | 18.7 | 20.5 | 11.0 | 14.7 | 11.0 | 7.7 | 7.7 | 5.9 | 1.0 | 1.9 |
Source: val.se

=== Södermanland ===
| Location | Turnout | Share | Votes | S | M | SD | MP | C | KD | V | L | F! | Other |
|---|---|---|---|---|---|---|---|---|---|---|---|---|---|
| Eskilstuna | | | | | | | | | | | | | |
| Flen | | | | | | | | | | | | | |
| Gnesta | | | | | | | | | | | | | |
| Katrineholm | | | | | | | | | | | | | |
| Nyköping | | | | | | | | | | | | | |
| Oxelösund | | | | | | | | | | | | | |
| Strängnäs | | | | | | | | | | | | | |
| Trosa | | | | | | | | | | | | | |
| Vingåker | | | | | | | | | | | | | |
| Total | 52.4 | 2.7 | 111,715 | 27.6 | 16.9 | 17.3 | 10.0 | 9.9 | 7.5 | 5.7 | 3.0 | 0.6 | 1.5 |
Source: val.se

=== Uppsala ===
| Location | Turnout | Share | Votes | S | M | SD | MP | C | KD | V | L | F! | Other |
|---|---|---|---|---|---|---|---|---|---|---|---|---|---|
| Enköping | | | | | | | | | | | | | |
| Heby | | | | | | | | | | | | | |
| Håbo | | | | | | | | | | | | | |
| Knivsta | | | | | | | | | | | | | |
| Tierp | | | | | | | | | | | | | |
| Uppsala | | | | | | | | | | | | | |
| Älvkarleby | | | | | | | | | | | | | |
| Östhammar | | | | | | | | | | | | | |
| Total | 58.9 | 3.9 | 163,084 | 21.5 | 15.9 | 13.0 | 14.7 | 11.9 | 8.5 | 7.1 | 4.4 | 0.9 | 2.0 |
Source: val.se

=== Värmland ===
| Location | Turnout | Share | Votes | S | M | SD | MP | C | KD | V | L | F! | Other |
|---|---|---|---|---|---|---|---|---|---|---|---|---|---|
| Arvika | | | | | | | | | | | | | |
| Eda | | | | | | | | | | | | | |
| Filipstad | | | | | | | | | | | | | |
| Forshaga | | | | | | | | | | | | | |
| Grums | | | | | | | | | | | | | |
| Hagfors | | | | | | | | | | | | | |
| Hammarö | | | | | | | | | | | | | |
| Karlstad | | | | | | | | | | | | | |
| Kil | | | | | | | | | | | | | |
| Kristinehamn | | | | | | | | | | | | | |
| Munkfors | | | | | | | | | | | | | |
| Storfors | | | | | | | | | | | | | |
| Sunne | | | | | | | | | | | | | |
| Säffle | | | | | | | | | | | | | |
| Torsby | | | | | | | | | | | | | |
| Årjäng | | | | | | | | | | | | | |
| Total | 51.5 | 2.6 | 109,194 | 29.0 | 14.1 | 16.8 | 9.3 | 11.3 | 8.4 | 6.2 | 2.9 | 0.6 | 1.4 |
Source: val.se

=== Västerbotten ===
| Location | Turnout | Share | Votes | S | M | SD | MP | C | KD | V | L | F! | Other |
|---|---|---|---|---|---|---|---|---|---|---|---|---|---|
| Bjurholm | | | | | | | | | | | | | |
| Dorotea | | | | | | | | | | | | | |
| Lycksele | | | | | | | | | | | | | |
| Malå | | | | | | | | | | | | | |
| Nordmaling | | | | | | | | | | | | | |
| Norsjö | | | | | | | | | | | | | |
| Robertsfors | | | | | | | | | | | | | |
| Skellefteå | | | | | | | | | | | | | |
| Sorsele | | | | | | | | | | | | | |
| Storuman | | | | | | | | | | | | | |
| Umeå | | | | | | | | | | | | | |
| Vilhelmina | | | | | | | | | | | | | |
| Vindeln | | | | | | | | | | | | | |
| Vännäs | | | | | | | | | | | | | |
| Åsele | | | | | | | | | | | | | |
| Total | 54.9 | 2.7 | 112,480 | 34.9 | 9.8 | 9.6 | 10.8 | 12.1 | 6.6 | 10.7 | 2.8 | 0.9 | 0.7 |
Source: val.se

=== Västernorrland ===
| Location | Turnout | Share | Votes | S | M | SD | MP | C | KD | V | L | F! | Other |
|---|---|---|---|---|---|---|---|---|---|---|---|---|---|
| Härnösand | | | | | | | | | | | | | |
| Kramfors | | | | | | | | | | | | | |
| Sollefteå | | | | | | | | | | | | | |
| Sundsvall | | | | | | | | | | | | | |
| Timrå | | | | | | | | | | | | | |
| Ånge | | | | | | | | | | | | | |
| Örnsköldsvik | | | | | | | | | | | | | |
| Total | 51.9 | 2.3 | 96,526 | 35.9 | 10.6 | 14.1 | 8.2 | 11.8 | 7.9 | 7.0 | 2.3 | 0.6 | 1.6 |
Source: val.se

=== Västmanland ===
| Location | Turnout | Share | Votes | S | M | SD | MP | C | KD | V | L | F! | Other |
|---|---|---|---|---|---|---|---|---|---|---|---|---|---|
| Arboga | | | | | | | | | | | | | |
| Fagersta | | | | | | | | | | | | | |
| Hallstahammar | | | | | | | | | | | | | |
| Kungsör | | | | | | | | | | | | | |
| Köping | | | | | | | | | | | | | |
| Norberg | | | | | | | | | | | | | |
| Sala | | | | | | | | | | | | | |
| Skinnskatteberg | | | | | | | | | | | | | |
| Surahammar | | | | | | | | | | | | | |
| Västerås | | | | | | | | | | | | | |
| Total | 50.3 | 2.4 | 101,280 | 26.7 | 17.7 | 17.7 | 8.7 | 10.3 | 7.8 | 5.7 | 3.4 | 0.5 | 1.5 |
Source: val.se

=== Västra Götaland ===
| Location | Turnout | Share | Votes | S | M | SD | MP | C | KD | V | L | F! | Other |
|---|---|---|---|---|---|---|---|---|---|---|---|---|---|
| Ale | | | | | | | | | | | | | |
| Alingsås | | | | | | | | | | | | | |
| Bengtsfors | | | | | | | | | | | | | |
| Bollebygd | | | | | | | | | | | | | |
| Borås | | | | | | | | | | | | | |
| Dals-Ed | | | | | | | | | | | | | |
| Essunga | | | | | | | | | | | | | |
| Falköping | | | | | | | | | | | | | |
| Färgelanda | | | | | | | | | | | | | |
| Grästorp | | | | | | | | | | | | | |
| Gothenburg | | | | | | | | | | | | | |
| Gullspång | | | | | | | | | | | | | |
| Götene | | | | | | | | | | | | | |
| Herrljunga | | | | | | | | | | | | | |
| Hjo | | | | | | | | | | | | | |
| Härryda | | | | | | | | | | | | | |
| Karlsborg | | | | | | | | | | | | | |
| Kungälv | | | | | | | | | | | | | |
| Lerum | | | | | | | | | | | | | |
| Lidköping | | | | | | | | | | | | | |
| Lilla Edet | | | | | | | | | | | | | |
| Lysekil | | | | | | | | | | | | | |
| Mariestad | | | | | | | | | | | | | |
| Mark | | | | | | | | | | | | | |
| Mellerud | | | | | | | | | | | | | |
| Munkedal | | | | | | | | | | | | | |
| Mölndal | | | | | | | | | | | | | |
| Orust | | | | | | | | | | | | | |
| Partille | | | | | | | | | | | | | |
| Skara | | | | | | | | | | | | | |
| Skövde | | | | | | | | | | | | | |
| Sotenäs | | | | | | | | | | | | | |
| Stenungsund | | | | | | | | | | | | | |
| Strömstad | | | | | | | | | | | | | |
| Svenljunga | | | | | | | | | | | | | |
| Tanum | | | | | | | | | | | | | |
| Tibro | | | | | | | | | | | | | |
| Tidaholm | | | | | | | | | | | | | |
| Tjörn | | | | | | | | | | | | | |
| Tranemo | | | | | | | | | | | | | |
| Trollhättan | | | | | | | | | | | | | |
| Töreboda | | | | | | | | | | | | | |
| Uddevalla | | | | | | | | | | | | | |
| Ulricehamn | | | | | | | | | | | | | |
| Vara | | | | | | | | | | | | | |
| Vårgårda | | | | | | | | | | | | | |
| Vänersborg | | | | | | | | | | | | | |
| Åmål | | | | | | | | | | | | | |
| Öckerö | | | | | | | | | | | | | |
| Total | 55.6 | 16.9 | 701,398 | 21.9 | 16.2 | 15.3 | 12.0 | 10.0 | 9.9 | 7.8 | 4.1 | 0.9 | 1.8 |
Source: val.se

=== Örebro ===
| Location | Turnout | Share | Votes | S | M | SD | MP | C | KD | V | L | F! | Other |
|---|---|---|---|---|---|---|---|---|---|---|---|---|---|
| Askersund | | | | | | | | | | | | | |
| Degerfors | | | | | | | | | | | | | |
| Hallsberg | | | | | | | | | | | | | |
| Hällefors | | | | | | | | | | | | | |
| Karlskoga | | | | | | | | | | | | | |
| Kumla | | | | | | | | | | | | | |
| Laxå | | | | | | | | | | | | | |
| Lekeberg | | | | | | | | | | | | | |
| Lindesberg | | | | | | | | | | | | | |
| Ljusnarsberg | | | | | | | | | | | | | |
| Nora | | | | | | | | | | | | | |
| Örebro | | | | | | | | | | | | | |
| Total | 53.4 | 2.9 | 120,081 | 28.6 | 13.4 | 16.3 | 10.8 | 9.9 | 8.9 | 6.3 | 3.5 | 0.7 | 1.6 |
Source: val.se

=== Östergötland ===
| Location | Turnout | Share | Votes | S | M | SD | MP | C | KD | V | L | F! | Other |
|---|---|---|---|---|---|---|---|---|---|---|---|---|---|
| Boxholm | | | | | | | | | | | | | |
| Finspång | | | | | | | | | | | | | |
| Kinda | | | | | | | | | | | | | |
| Linköping | | | | | | | | | | | | | |
| Mjölby | | | | | | | | | | | | | |
| Motala | | | | | | | | | | | | | |
| Norrköping | | | | | | | | | | | | | |
| Söderköping | | | | | | | | | | | | | |
| Vadstena | | | | | | | | | | | | | |
| Valdemarsvik | | | | | | | | | | | | | |
| Ydre | | | | | | | | | | | | | |
| Åtvidaberg | | | | | | | | | | | | | |
| Ödeshög | | | | | | | | | | | | | |
| Total | 54.7 | 4.5 | 188,617 | 24.0 | 17.5 | 15.4 | 11.1 | 11.6 | 8.9 | 5.5 | 3.5 | 0.6 | 1.9 |
Source: val.se
