= Grevie och Beden =

- Location within Skåne Location within Sweden
- Coordinates: 55°37′37″N 13°13′13″E
- Country: Sweden
- Province: Skåne
- County: Skåne County
- Municipality: Staffanstorp Municipality

Area
  - Total: 0.43 km^{2} (0.17 sq mi)

Population (31 December 2010)
  - Total: 241
  - Density: 565/km^{2} (1,460/sq mi)
- Time zone: UTC+1 (CET)
  - Summer (DST): UTC+2 (CEST)

Grevie och Beden (or Beden-Grevie) is a locality situated in Staffanstorp Municipality, Skåne County, Sweden with 241 inhabitants in 2010.
