= Jakriborg =

Housing estate in Hjärup, Sweden

Coordinates: 55°40′30″N 13°08′05″E

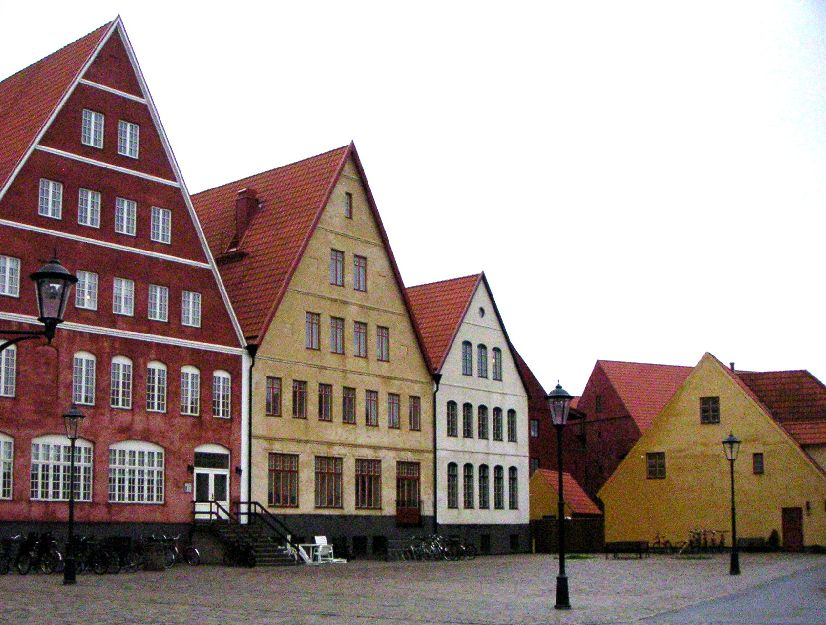
Many of the apartments include two or three storeys.

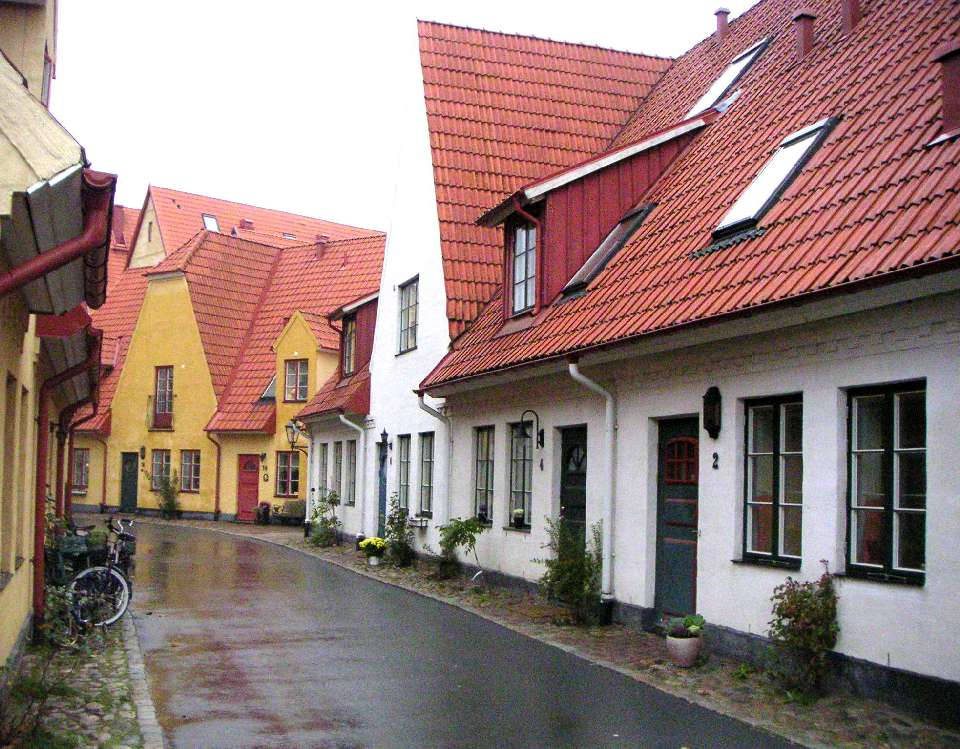
As a matter of principle, the streets are neither long nor straight.

Jakriborg is a housing estate in Hjärup, Staffanstorp Municipality between Malmö and Lund in Scania, southern Sweden.

The area was built in the late 1990s by the real estate firm Jakri AB and had been growing ever since. Jakri AB was founded by two brothers, Jan Berggren and Krister Berggren. Jan Berggren's project was realised through collaboration with the two architects Robin Manger Architect SAR/MSA and Marcus Axelsson Architect SAR/MSA. The Jakriborg project displays similarities with the contemporary New Urbanism movement. It is often compared to the Poundbury project in England built by Prince Charles. It is also a well-known example of traditional and New Classical Architecture.

== Architecture ==
Jakriborg's architectural style has a variety of intricate maze-like streets and passageways. Jakriborg is not connected to traditional styles of other, more northern, parts of Scandinavia, nor with the functionalism that has been dominant in most of Europe for much of the 20th century. Instead, the style is inspired by pre-industrial town architecture found in the coastal region of the southern Baltic and the North Sea between Flanders and Tallinn, of which the old Hansa City of Lübeck is the best known example.

== History ==
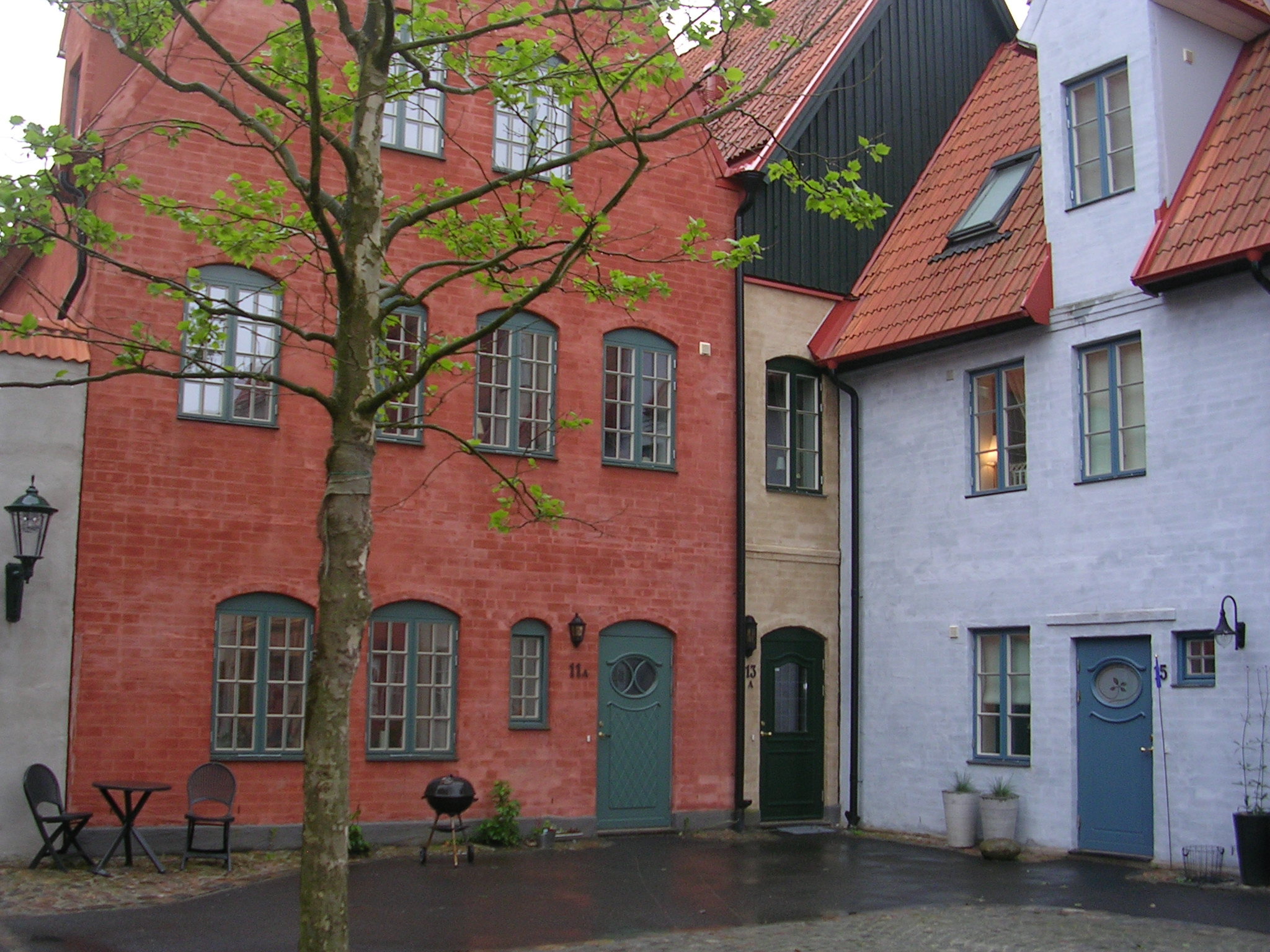
The buildings of Jakriborg are constructed with traditional techniques and elements.

Hjärup is built on the fields of the village of Uppåkra, which existed for over a thousand years as the predecessor of Lund until the town was moved in 990 to a new and more secure location a few miles away, at which time Uppåkra reverted to a small town. Jakriborg is combined and joint with Hjärup by the railroad Malmö-Lund on the Copenhagen-Stockholm line.

== Population ==
Initially Jakriborg started with less than 300 families and by 2005 had over 500 families. However a vast portion of the surrounding land was purchased in 2002 by Jakri AB which has additional space to further expand the town district by more than ten times its current size and capacity. Jakri AB have stated that they do not intend on rapidly growing Jakriborg as they believe growth should happen naturally through organic increase of the society. Therefore the number of yearly constructed apartment units remains deliberately moderate.

== See also ==
- Poundbury
- Bournville
- Port Sunlight
- Welwyn Garden City
