= Särslöv Church =

- Särslövs kyrka
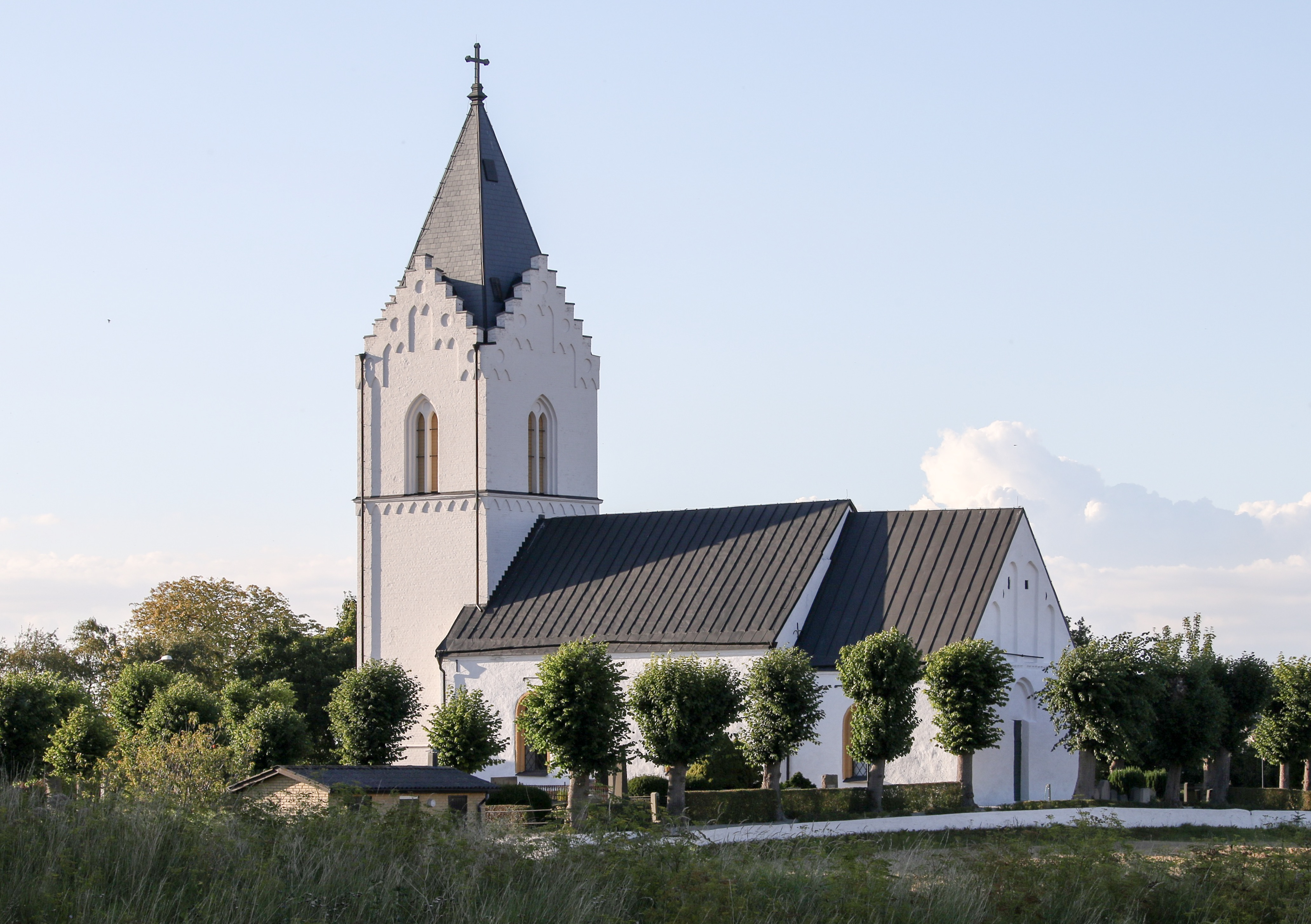
- Särslöv Church

- 55°37′17″N 13°09′36″E
- Country: Sweden
- Denomination: Church of Sweden

Särslöv Church (Swedish: Särslövs kyrka) is a medieval church in Staffanstorp Municipality, Scania, Sweden.

== History ==
Särslöv Church was built in the 12th century. In the 14th century, the ceiling of the chancel was replaced by the currently visible vaults and in the 15th century new vaults were also built in the nave. A church porch was also added in the 15th century, but demolished in the 18th century. The tower was built in 1862 and replaced an earlier belfry adjacent to the church. In 1954 electricity was installed, and a large renovation was carried out between 1976 and 1977. Further renovations have been carried out in 1980, 1994, 2001 and 2005.

== Murals and furnishings ==
The church was decorated with medieval murals on at least two occasions. Particularly well preserved are those in the chancel, made c. 1500 but later covered with whitewash. They were rediscovered in the 19th century and restored in the 1970s through the removal of the whitewash. They depict eight of the Apostles, grouped in pairs. The murals in the nave are only partially preserved.

The church has a rood cross of high artisanal quality from the end of the 15th century. The altarpiece is from 1604 and was repainted in 1796. The pulpit dates from 1872.
