= Lomma =

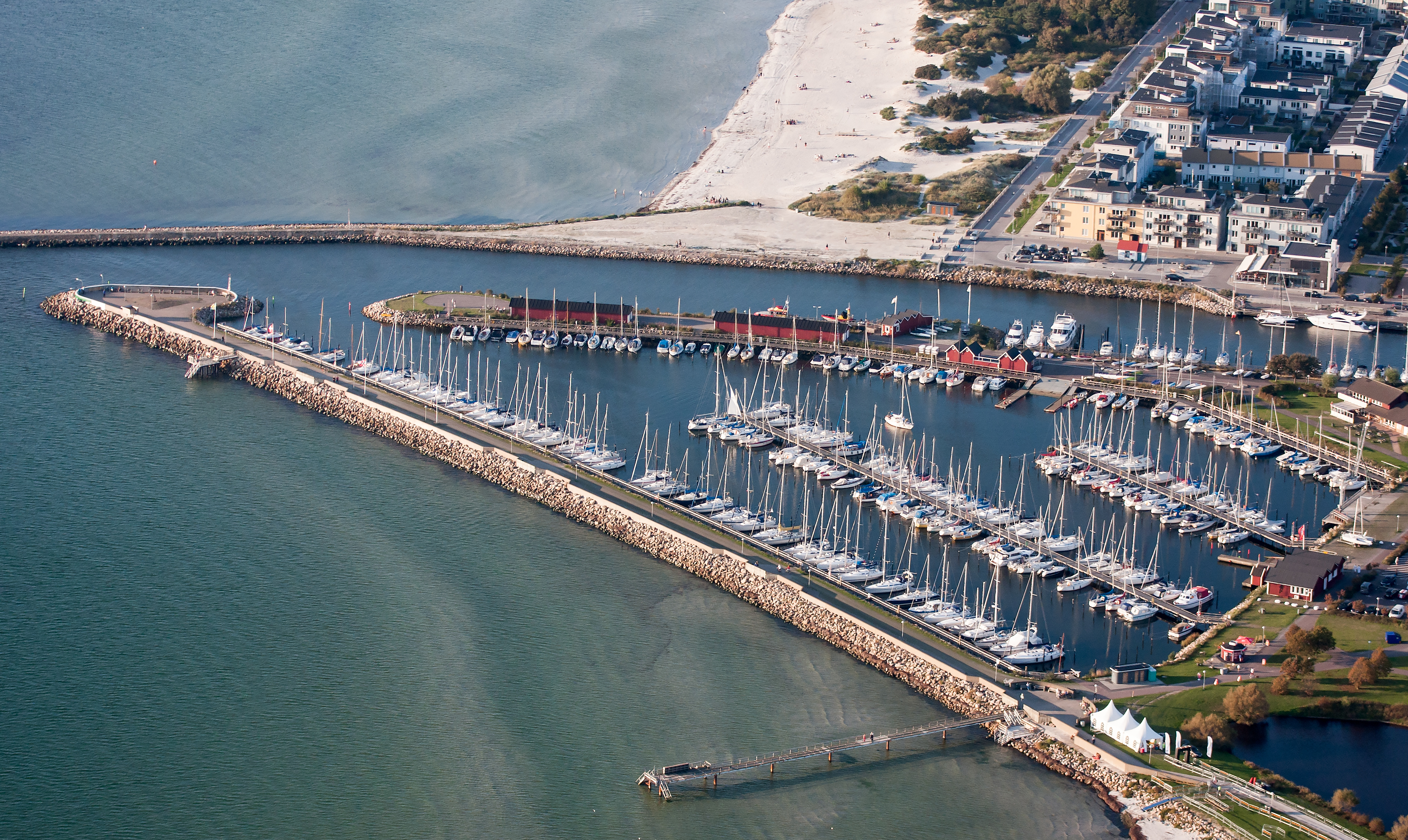
- Lomma Harbour

- Coat of arms

- Location within Skåne Location within Sweden
- Coordinates: 55°40′N 13°05′E
- Country: Sweden
- Province: Skåne
- County: Skåne County
- Municipality: Lomma Municipality

Area
  - Total: 5.84 km^{2} (2.25 sq mi)

Population (31 December 2020)
  - Total: 13,772
  - Density: 2,359/km^{2} (6,110/sq mi)
- Time zone: UTC+1 (CET)
  - Summer (DST): UTC+2 (CEST)

Lomma (Swedish pronunciation: [ˈlʊ̂mːa]) is a locality and the seat of Lomma Municipality, Skåne County, Sweden. In 2020 it had 13,772 inhabitants.

== History ==
Lomma was mentioned in a deed of Cnut the Great under the name Lumaby in the year 1085. Skåne's cultural centre at the time was the plains surrounding Lund and Dalby known as Lundaslätten. Lomma was a natural port for customs, shipping and trade, owing to its location at the mouth of the river Höje å, which was the main transport link via to Uppåkra, Lund, Heddinge (now named Kyrkheddinge) and Dalby. Lomma had city status at this time, though it subsequently lost it in favour of Malmö. Until the construction of a bridge across the Höje å in 1682, there was a ferry across the river.

By 1682 there was already a brickworks in Lomma, but the settlement grew after Frans Henrik Kockum founded a brickworks -- at that time one of Sweden's largest -- in Lomma in 1854. It produced over 2.5 million bricks which led to the expansion of the harbour, since the sea was the natural means for onward transport.

The soil round Lomma, in addition to being suitable for brick-making, could also be used for cement production. Skånska Cement AB was founded in 1871 and, beginning the following year, manufactured Portland cement in Lomma. The lime, a key ingredient in cement, was sourced in part from Saltholm. Brick and mortar production were seasonal work and at most 350 people worked at the cement factory during the summer season. There was additionally an asbestos cement factory, known as Lomma Eternit, which closed in 1977 after workers became ill following exposure to asbestos.

== Geography ==
Lomma lies on Lommabukten. It is located to the west of Lund, north of Malmö and south of Bjärred.

== Sports ==
The following sports clubs are located in Lomma:

- GIF Nike
- Lobas
- Lomma FBC

== Notable people ==
- Hanna Bennison (born 2002), footballer for the Sweden national team and Real Madrid
- Filip Jörgensen (born 2002), Swedish born Danish professional footballer for Chelsea F.C.

== Gallery ==
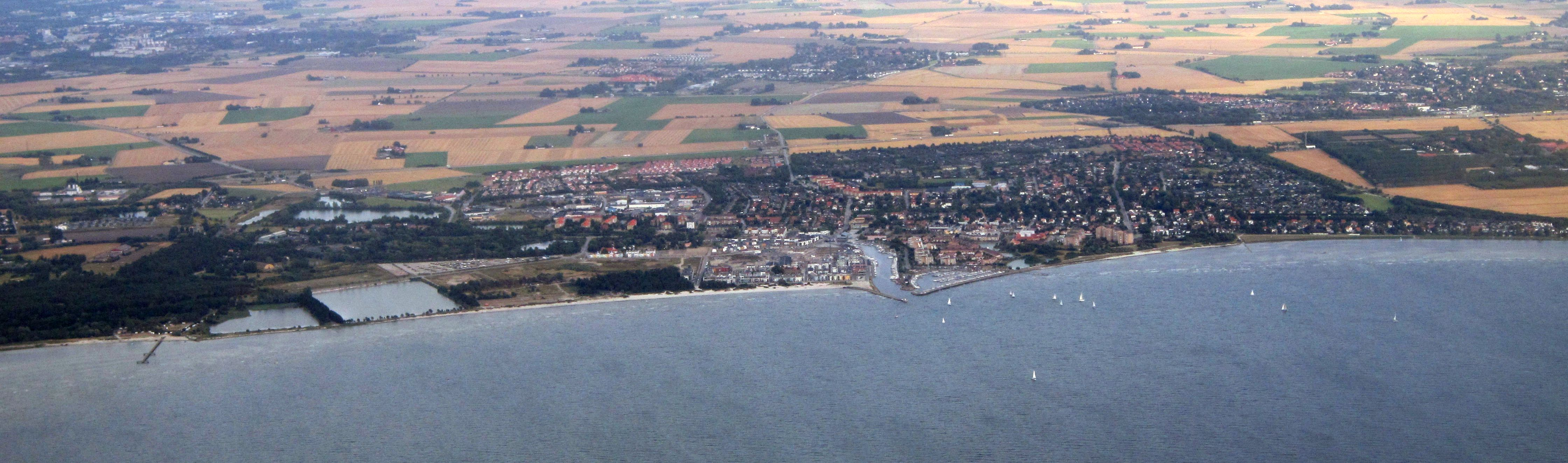
Aerial view
