= Runemo =

- Location within Sweden Gävleborg Location within Sweden
- Coordinates: 61°22′N 16°07′E
- Country: Sweden
- Province: Hälsingland
- County: Gävleborg County
- Municipality: Ovanåker Municipality

Area
  - Total: 0.66 km^{2} (0.25 sq mi)

Population (31 December 2010)
  - Total: 263
  - Density: 396/km^{2} (1,030/sq mi)
- Time zone: UTC+1 (CET)
  - Summer (DST): UTC+2 (CEST)

Runemo is a locality situated in Ovanåker Municipality, Gävleborg County, Sweden with 263 inhabitants in 2010.
