= Jan Berggren =

Swedish real estate developer

Jan Å Berggren
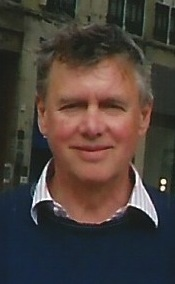
- Berggren in 2011
- Born: June 12, 1946 (age 80); Malmö, Sweden
- Education: Lund University
- Children: 2
- Website: www.Jakri.se

Jan Å Berggren (born June 12, 1946) is a well known Swedish real estate developer who co-founded Jakri AB in 1983. Berggren is best known for his pioneering new urban village project, Jakriborg near Lund in South Sweden or Skåne County. Jan Berggren and his younger brother and partner Krister built Jakri AB initially as a property fund. In recent years the brothers have diversified their projects across Scandinavia creating what is now one of South Sweden's most successful family run property funds.

== Jakriborg ==
Jan Berggren was interviewed by Sydsvenskan in 2011 in reference to Jakriborg which was ranked in a book publishing Sweden's 100 most remarkable sights', listing Jakriborg at number 2. Berggren's project has often been compared to Poundbury which was built by Prince Charles in England. Jan Berggren is regarded as one of the pioneers of Staffanstorp through the realization of his project Jakri together with his brother Krister (Hence Jan and Krister ⁓ 'Jakri').
