= Lomma Municipality =

Lomma Municipality Lomma kommun
- Municipality
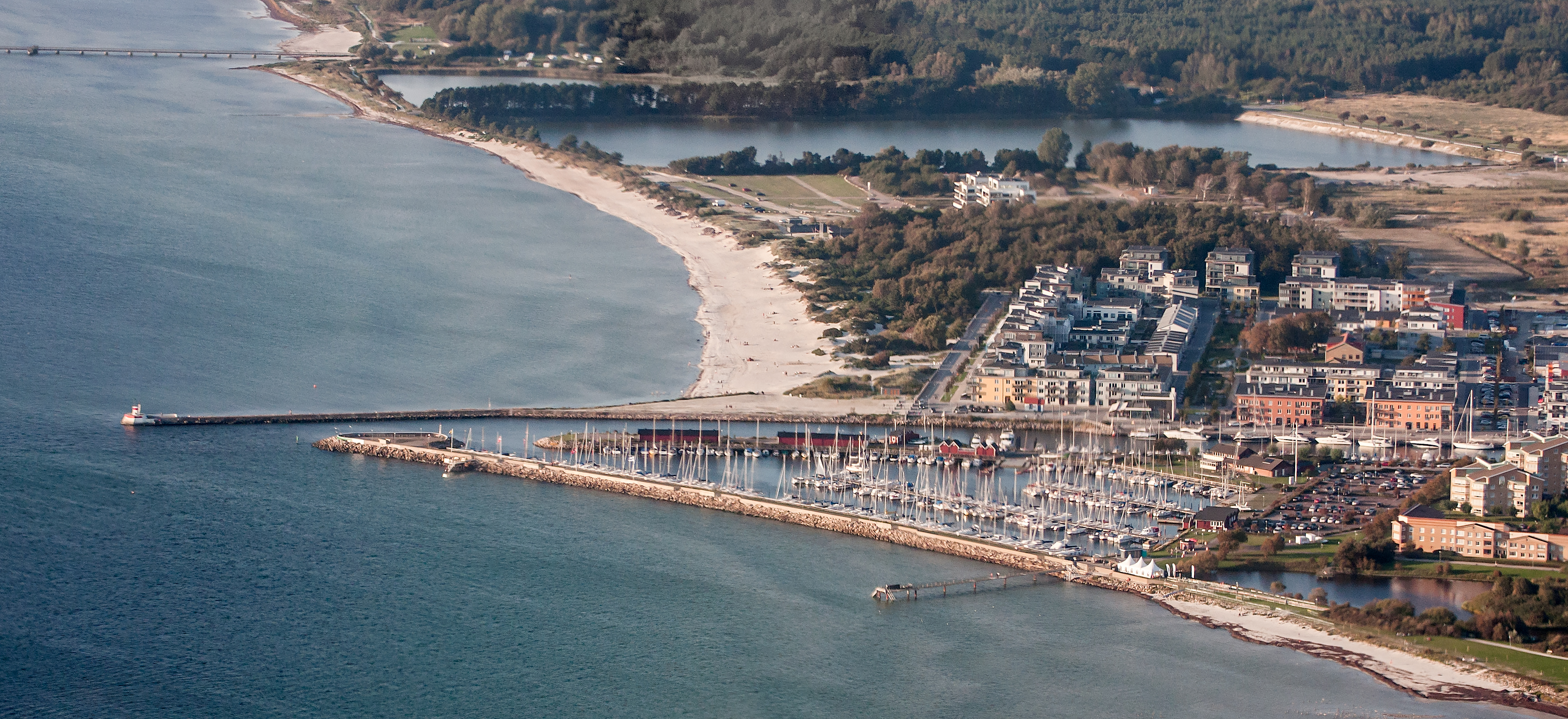

- Coat of arms

- Coordinates: 55°40′N 13°05′E
- Country: Sweden
- County: Skåne County
- Seat: Lomma

Area
  - Total: 90.2 km^{2} (34.8 sq mi)
  - Land: 55.52 km^{2} (21.44 sq mi)
  - Water: 34.68 km^{2} (13.39 sq mi)
- Area as of 1 January 2014.

Population (30 June 2025)
  - Total: 24,777
  - Density: 446.3/km^{2} (1,156/sq mi)
- Time zone: UTC+1 (CET)
  - Summer (DST): UTC+2 (CEST)
- ISO 3166 code: SE
- Province: Scania
- Municipal code: 1262
- Website: lomma.se

Lomma Municipality (Swedish: Lomma kommun) is a municipality in Skåne County in southern Sweden, about 10 km north of Malmö. Its seat is located in Lomma with secondary locality Bjärred being of almost equal population size.

The present municipality was created through the amalgamation of the market town Lomma and the rural municipality Flädie. It took place in 1963, between the two nationwide local government reforms of 1952 and 1971.

== Geography ==
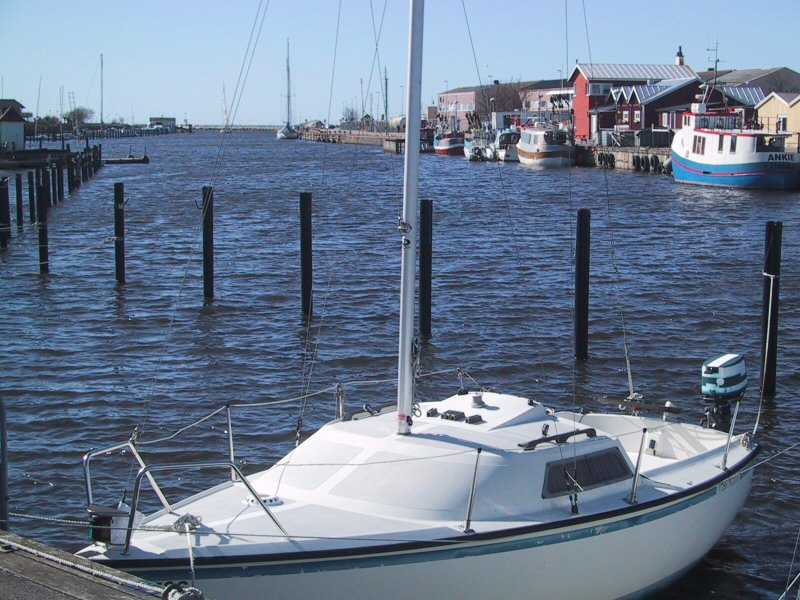
The harbour in Lomma

The small municipality borders to Kävlinge Municipality, Burlöv Municipality, Staffanstorp Municipality and Lund Municipality. As Burlöv also is notably small, Lomma Municipality almost borders to Malmö Municipality too.

It is situated by Öresund, at the inlet of the small river Höje å. Along the river lies a yacht marina. In the old industrial area along the river new appartements and villas are erected, with some facing the river or the beach. The beaches along its coasts also attract visitors from other municipalities; Lomma Municipality's beaches are the principal beaches for people from the beach-less Lund.

10 kilometres (6.2 mi) to the north-east is the university city of Lund, with some 80,000 inhabitants, about the same distance as to Malmö (with its 285,000 inhabitants) to the south. Lomma Municipality is also considered part of Metropolitan Malmö, showing itself for instance by the 6,500 commuters that live in there. Travelling to and from Lomma Municipality is easy, as a main highway actually passes straight through the town of Lomma, connecting with Lund and Malmö, and with other cities to the north.

Geologically, its terrain is almost completely flat levelled, which is the custom for south-western Skåne as a whole. The highest location in Lomma Municipality is 40 metres (130 ft) above sea level.

=== Localities ===
There were three localities in the municipality as of 2018.

Localities	Population
Lomma	12,368
Bjärred	9,844
Flädie	231

Of note is also Alnarp, where one of the main campuses of the Swedish University of Agricultural Sciences is located.

== Demographics ==
This is a demographic table based on Lomma Municipality's electoral districts in the 2022 Swedish general election sourced from SVT's election platform, in turn taken from SCB official statistics.

In total there were 24,615 residents, including 17,944 Swedish citizens of voting age. 38.4% voted for the left coalition and 60.8% for the right coalition. Indicators are in percentage points except population totals and income.

Location	Residents	Citizen adults	Left vote	Right vote	Employed	Swedish parents	Foreign heritage	Income SEK	Degree
Location			%	%					
Bjärehov NO	2,274	1,741	35.3	64.1	84	92	8	37,263	80
Bjärred NÖ-Flädie	2,178	1,551	41.3	57.9	83	84	16	31,283	67
Bjärred S-Önnerup	2,028	1,515	31.9	67.4	84	92	8	42,469	79
Borgeby-Löddesnäs Ö	2,085	1,395	38.6	60.8	86	85	15	37,690	76
Båtgatorna-Fågelstaden	1,847	1,295	41.7	57.1	88	91	9	38,386	74
Karstorp-Alnarp	1,633	1,129	41.6	58.0	75	84	16	29,667	63
Lervik	2,218	1,443	37.3	61.9	88	84	16	34,952	63
Lomma C	1,982	1,614	42.3	57.1	80	84	16	25,953	66
Lomma Hamn	2,328	1,912	32.1	67.4	87	90	10	36,512	67
Lomma N	2,236	1,630	38.1	60.8	82	85	15	30,271	56
Löddesnäs V	1,940	1,386	43.3	56.1	87	90	10	36,661	80
Piläng	1,866	1,333	43.5	55.4	87	88	12	33,692	67
Source: SVT

== History ==
The area where Lomma Municipality is now is located between two small rivers, and was inhabited by hunters in the Stone Age. The name Lomma can be traced to 1085, and in the ensuing centuries it established some wealth thanks to merchancy with the episcopal see in Lund.

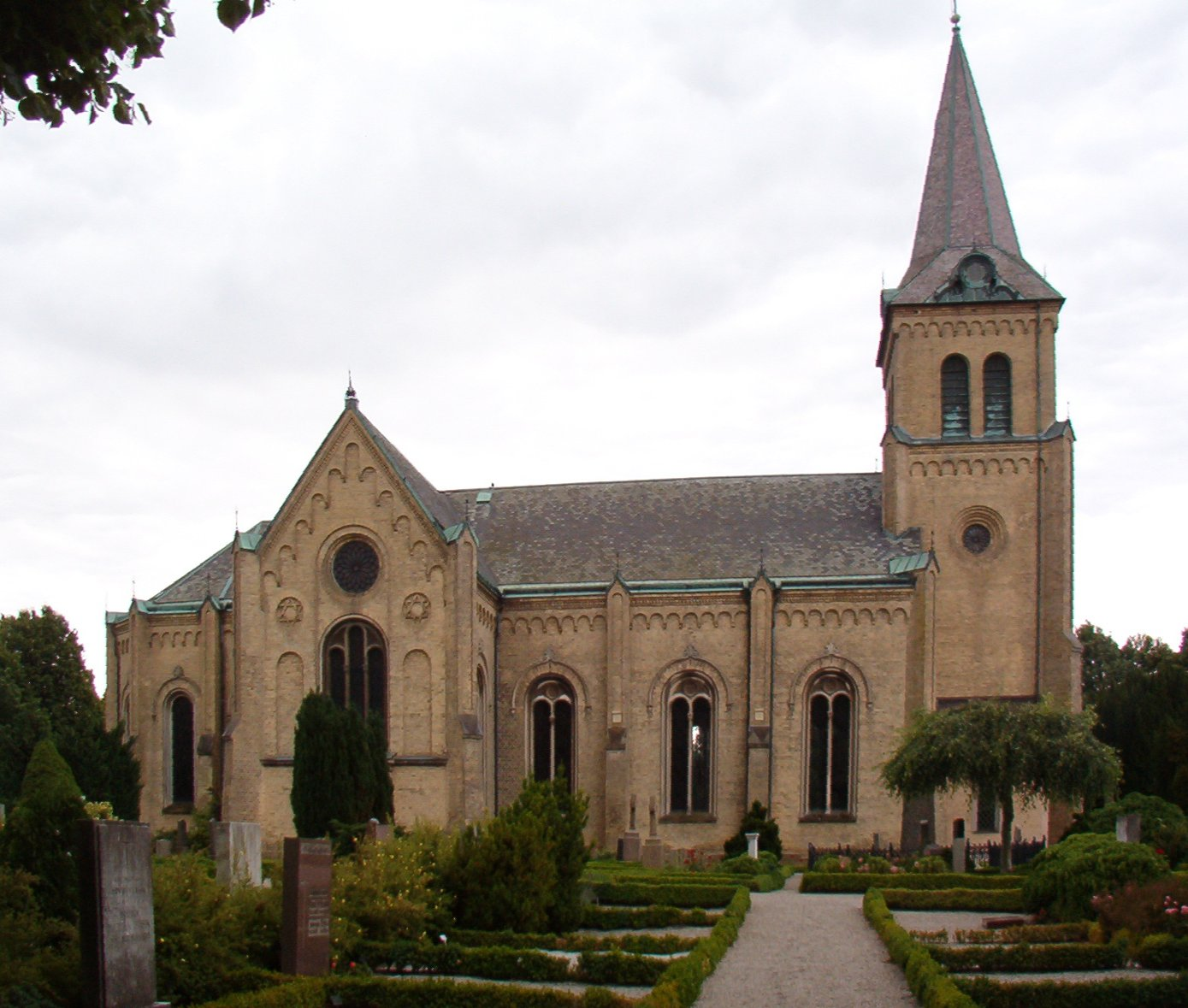
Lomma church

Nonetheless, the area was only a village until Sweden's first cement works was established in 1871. The ground consists of a certain clay stemming from the last ice age, and is available in large quantities in Lomma Municipality. A fully fledged industry was started in the 1860s, and by the end of the century Lomma Municipality had five brick factories. The bricks from Lomma are yellow of appearance and were regarded as the highest kind of bricks during that century. One church built with those bricks is the church in Lomma, (Lomma kyrka), a large neo Gothic church that was finished in the 1870s.

The coat of arms depicts an anchor - showing the importance of the harbour - and a brick wall, indicating that Lomma Municipality once actually had city rights as well as its brick industry.

== See also ==
- Municipalities of Sweden
