= Hjärup =

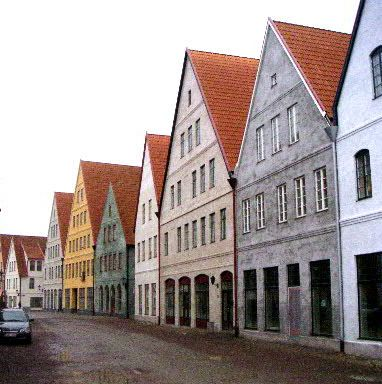
- New houses soon ready to receive their tenants in 1991 Jakriborg

- Location within Skåne Location within Sweden
- Coordinates: 55°40′N 13°10′E
- Country: Sweden
- Province: Skåne
- County: Skåne County
- Municipality: Staffanstorp Municipality

Area
  - Total: 1.70 km^{2} (0.66 sq mi)

Population (31 December 2010)
  - Total: 4,265
  - Density: 2,510/km^{2} (6,500/sq mi)
- Time zone: UTC+1 (CET)
  - Summer (DST): UTC+2 (CEST)

Hjärup (Swedish pronunciation: [ˈjɛ̌ːrɵp]) is, with its more than 4,250 inhabitants, the second largest locality in Staffanstorp Municipality, Scania, Sweden.

Hjärup has a station on the Pågatågen system. The locality has a suburban character with semi-detached houses initially built in the 1960s–1970s on Lundaslätten, the fertile plain south of Lund, initially on land sold off from the farm Hjerup. Hjärup was until the 1990s confined in between the railway and the main road Malmö–Lund. On the other side of the railway, adjacent to Hjärup's station, a district called Jakriborg is now growing.

Hjärup consists of about 1,600 households (2005) with public services chiefly limited to preschools, schools, health care center and old people's home, as virtually all inhabitants commute to work in the Greater Malmö metropolitan area. 400 of the dwellings are in the housing estate Jakriborg.

The distance to Lund is 5 km by bike, bus or car — or 3 minutes by train.

The distance to Malmö is about 15 km — or 10 minutes by train.
