= Flädie =

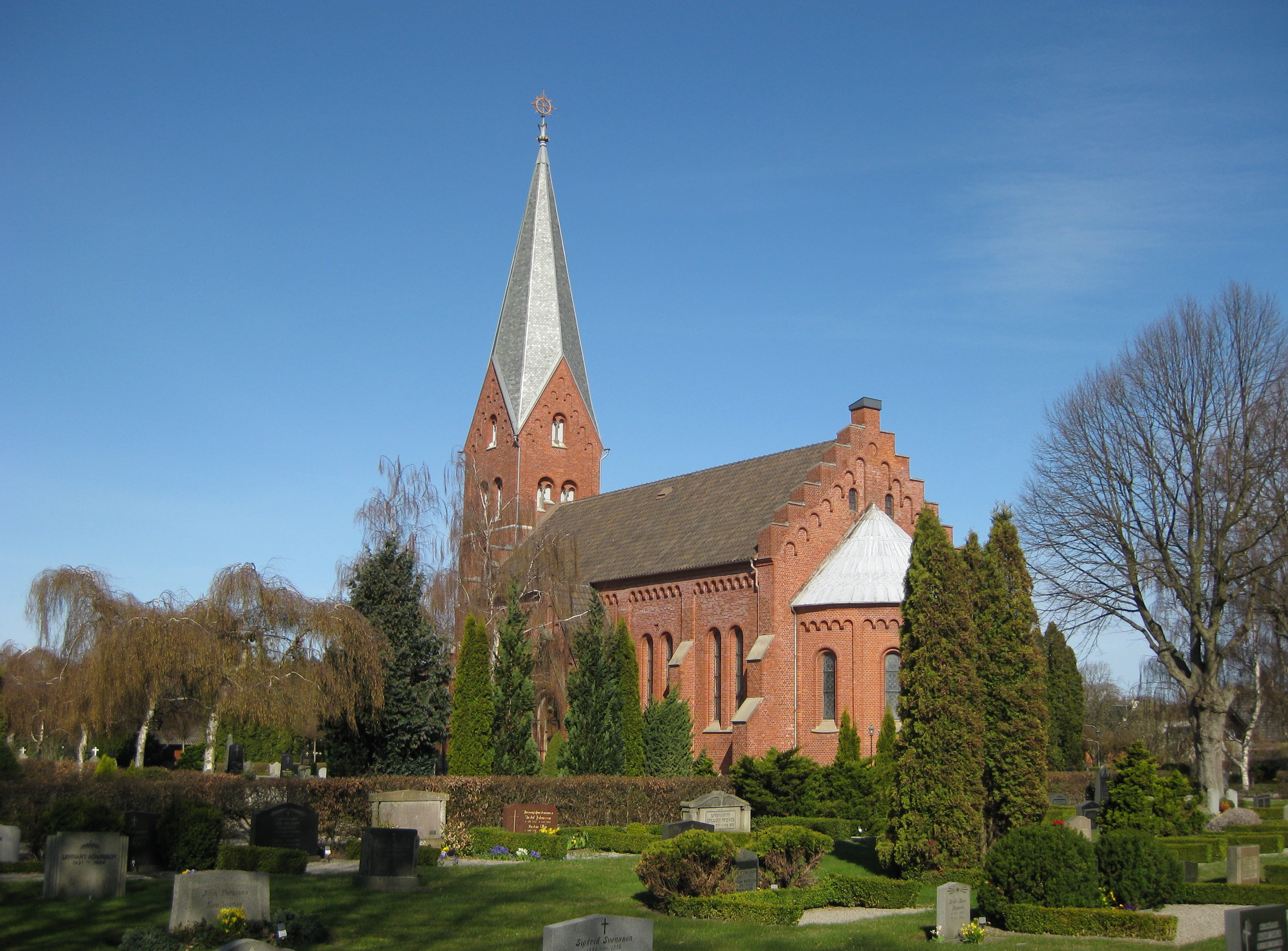
- Flädie Church

- Location within Skåne Location within Sweden
- Coordinates: 55°44′N 13°04′E
- Country: Sweden
- Province: Skåne
- County: Skåne County
- Municipality: Lomma Municipality

Area
  - Total: 0.20 km^{2} (0.077 sq mi)

Population (31 December 2010)
  - Total: 251
  - Density: 1,236/km^{2} (3,200/sq mi)
- Time zone: UTC+1 (CET)
  - Summer (DST): UTC+2 (CEST)

Flädie (Swedish pronunciation: [ˈflɛ̂ːdɪɛ]) is a locality situated in Lomma Municipality, Skåne County, Sweden with 251 inhabitants in 2010.
