= Roteberg =

- Location within Sweden Gävleborg Location within Sweden
- Coordinates: 61°23′N 15°49′E
- Country: Sweden
- Province: Hälsingland
- County: Gävleborg County
- Municipality: Ovanåker Municipality

Area
  - Total: 0.81 km^{2} (0.31 sq mi)

Population (31 December 2010)
  - Total: 393
  - Density: 486/km^{2} (1,260/sq mi)
- Time zone: UTC+1 (CET)
  - Summer (DST): UTC+2 (CEST)

Roteberg is a locality situated in Ovanåker Municipality, Gävleborg County, Sweden with 393 inhabitants in 2010.
