= Bergströmshusen =

- Location within Skåne Location within Sweden
- Coordinates: 55°40′40″N 13°10′25″E
- Country: Sweden
- Province: Skåne
- County: Skåne County
- Municipality: Staffanstorp Municipality

Area
  - Total: 0.13 km^{2} (0.050 sq mi)

Population (31 December 2010)
  - Total: 209
  - Density: 1,581/km^{2} (4,090/sq mi)
- Time zone: UTC+1 (CET)
  - Summer (DST): UTC+2 (CEST)

Bergströmshusen is a locality situated in Staffanstorp Municipality, Skåne County, Sweden with 209 inhabitants in 2010.
