= Viksjöfors =

- Location within Sweden Gävleborg Location within Sweden
- Coordinates: 61°20′N 15°57′E
- Country: Sweden
- Province: Hälsingland
- County: Gävleborg County
- Municipality: Ovanåker Municipality

Area
  - Total: 0.63 km^{2} (0.24 sq mi)

Population (31 December 2010)
  - Total: 244
  - Density: 385/km^{2} (1,000/sq mi)
- Time zone: UTC+1 (CET)
  - Summer (DST): UTC+2 (CEST)

Viksjöfors is a locality situated in Ovanåker Municipality, Gävleborg County, Sweden with 244 inhabitants in 2010.
