= Kyrkheddinge =

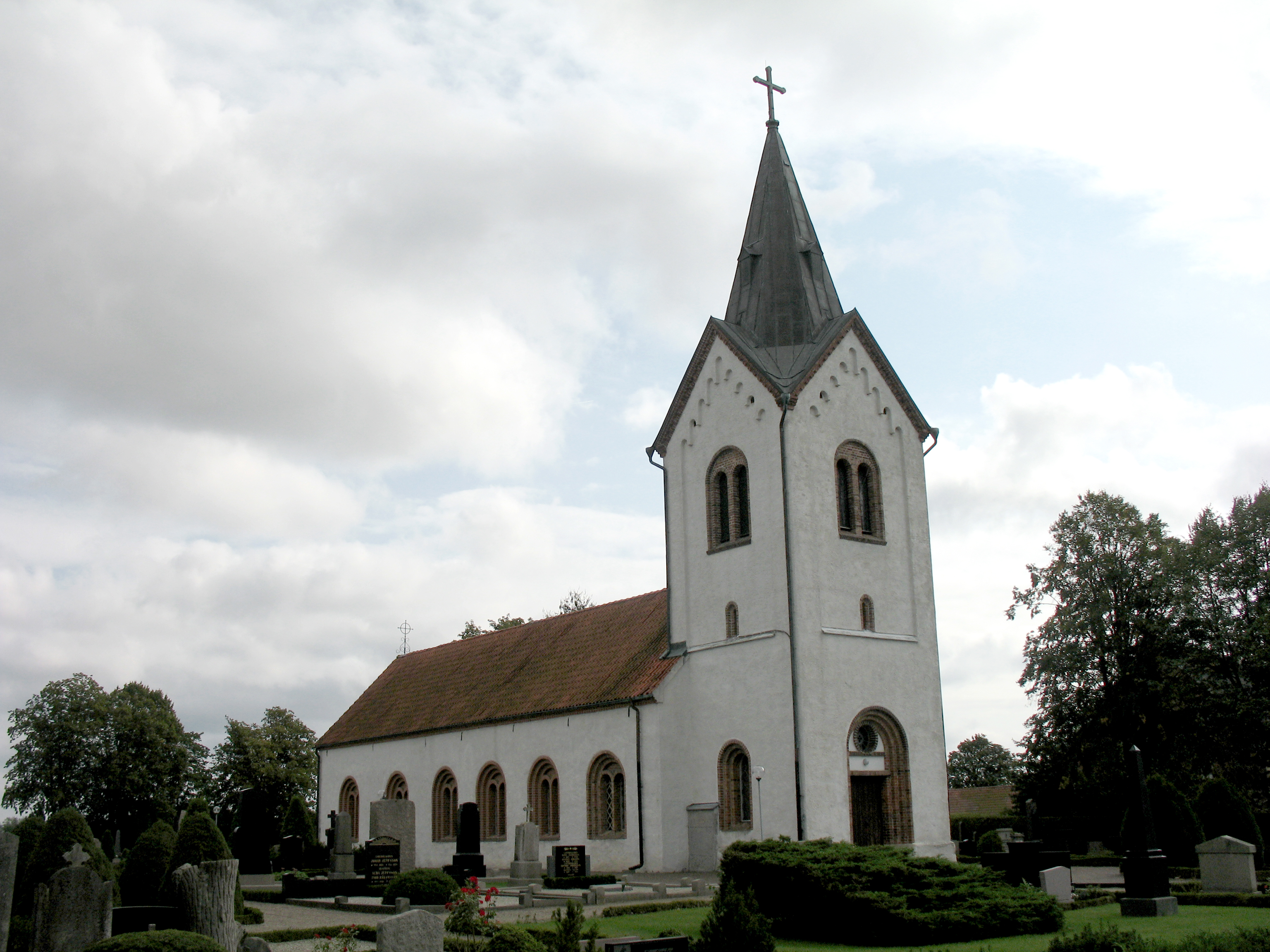
- Kyrkheddinge church

- Location within Skåne Location within Sweden
- Coordinates: 55°39′N 13°16′E
- Country: Sweden
- Province: Skåne
- County: Skåne County
- Municipality: Staffanstorp Municipality

Area
  - Total: 0.39 km^{2} (0.15 sq mi)

Population (31 December 2010)
  - Total: 276
  - Density: 716/km^{2} (1,850/sq mi)
- Time zone: UTC+1 (CET)
  - Summer (DST): UTC+2 (CEST)

Kyrkheddinge is a locality situated in Staffanstorp Municipality, Skåne County, Sweden with 276 inhabitants in 2010. It is situated about 9 km (6 mi) southeast of Lund and 6 km (4 mi) west-southwest of Dalby.
