= Höje River =

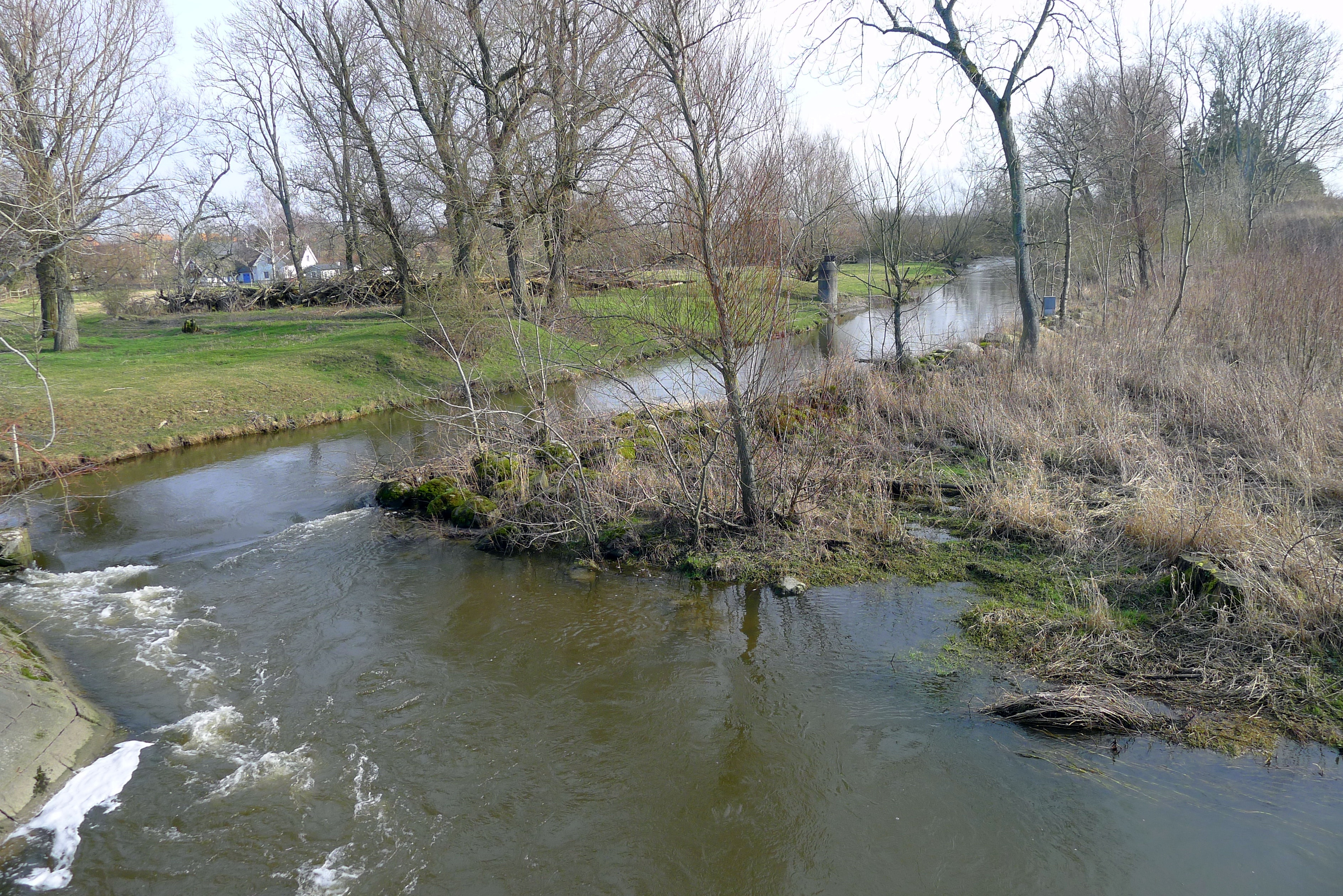
- Native name: Höje å (Swedish)

Location
- Country: Sweden
- County: Skåne

Physical characteristics
- Mouth: Lommabukten in Öresund
  - location: Lomma
  - coordinates: 55°40′33″N 13°03′22″E
  - elevation: 0 m (0 ft)
- Length: 35 km (22 mi)
- Basin size: 316.0 km^{2} (122.0 sq mi)

Höje River (Swedish: Höje å) is a river in Scania in southern Sweden. It is about 35 km long and flows from the Häckeberga lake in the Lund Municipality and empties into the Øresund at Lomma.
