= Ovanåker Municipality =

Ovanåker Municipality Ovanåkers kommun
- Municipality
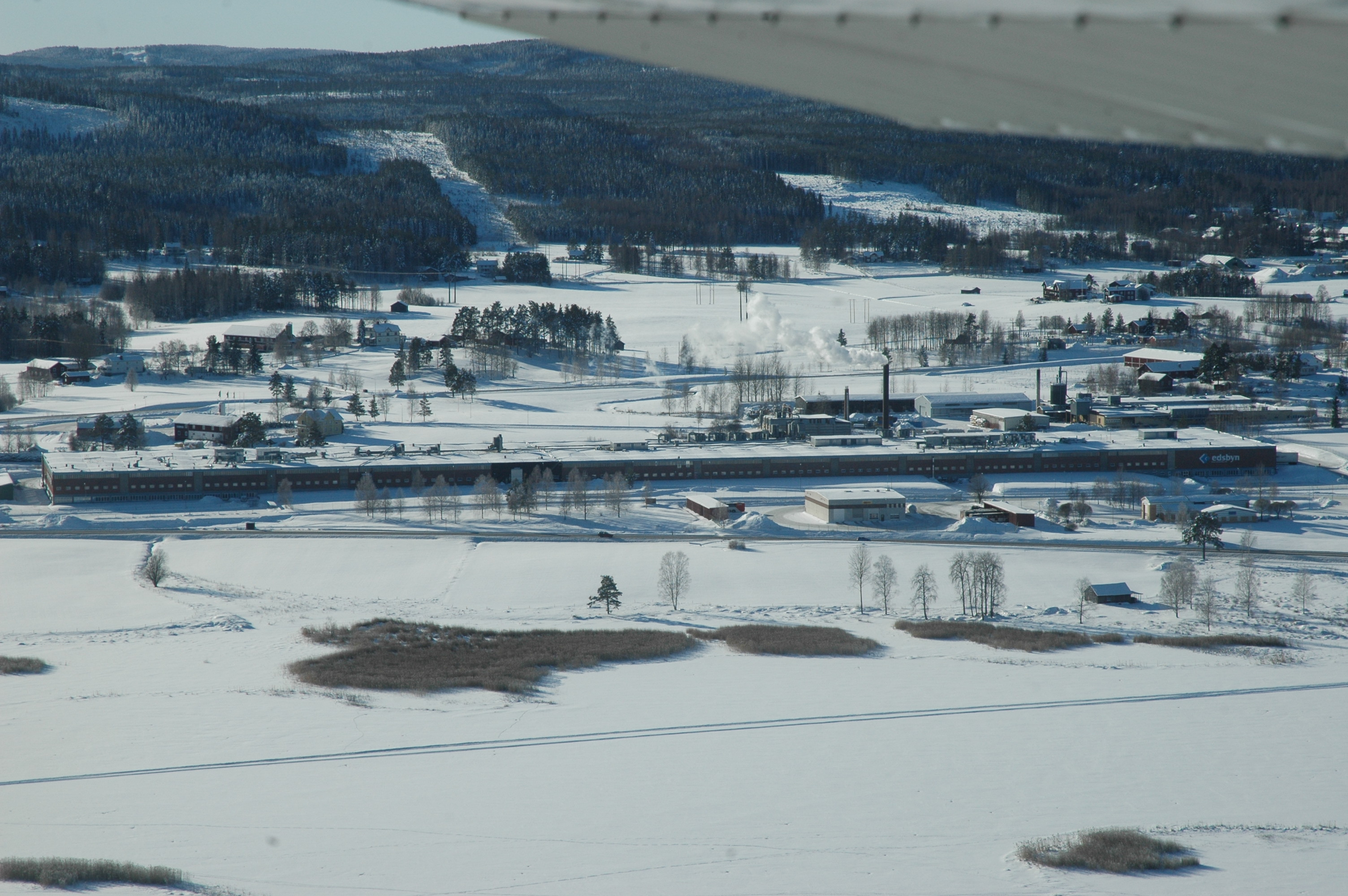

- Flag Coat of arms

- Coordinates: 61°23′N 15°49′E
- Country: Sweden
- County: Gävleborg County
- Seat: Edsbyn

Area
  - Total: 2,016.98 km^{2} (778.76 sq mi)
  - Land: 1,873.31 km^{2} (723.29 sq mi)
  - Water: 143.67 km^{2} (55.47 sq mi)
- Area as of 1 January 2014.

Population (30 June 2025)
  - Total: 11,312
  - Density: 6.0385/km^{2} (15.640/sq mi)
- Time zone: UTC+1 (CET)
  - Summer (DST): UTC+2 (CEST)
- ISO 3166 code: SE
- Province: Hälsingland
- Municipal code: 2121
- Website: www.ovanaker.se

Ovanåker Municipality (Swedish: Ovanåkers kommun) is a municipality in Gävleborg County, east central Sweden. The municipal seat is located in Edsbyn.

The subdivision reform of 1952 saw the amalgamation of "old" Ovanåker with Voxna (both formed by the first local government acts of 1862). In 1977 Alfta (which 1974-1976 had been in Bollnäs Municipality) was added.

== Localities ==
- Alfta
- Edsbyn (seat)
- Knåda
- Ovanåker
- Roteberg
- Runemo
- Viksjöfors

== Demographics ==
This is a demographic table based on Ovanåker Municipality's electoral districts in the 2022 Swedish general election sourced from SVT's election platform, in turn taken from SCB official statistics.

In total there were 11,705 residents, including 9,015 Swedish citizens of voting age. 47.5% voted for the left coalition and 51.7% for the right coalition. Indicators are in percentage points except population totals and income.

Location	Residents	Citizen adults	Left vote	Right vote	Employed	Swedish parents	Foreign heritage	Income SEK	Degree
Location			%	%					
Alfta N	2,369	1,790	46.5	52.6	77	82	18	21,878	26
Alfta S	2,212	1,788	45.6	53.4	84	95	5	23,438	30
Edsbyn	2,469	1,807	54.8	44.2	78	82	18	21,379	26
Ovanåker N	2,230	1,729	45.0	54.3	86	97	3	25,717	31
Ovanåker V	2,425	1,901	45.5	53.9	83	90	10	23,309	24
Source: SVT
