= Staffanstorp Municipality =

Staffanstorp Municipality Staffanstorps kommun
- Municipality
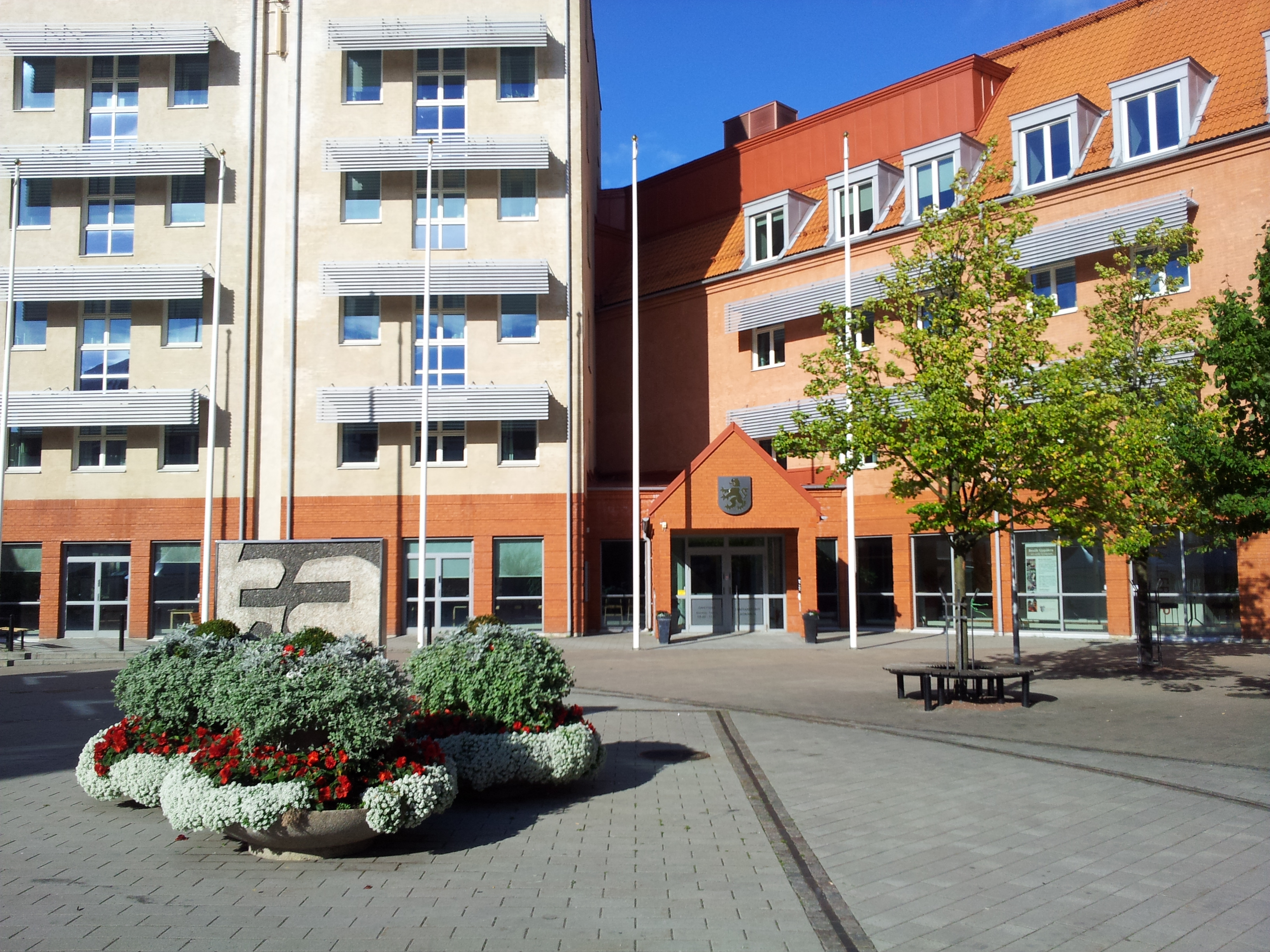
- Municipal Hall

- Coat of arms

- Coordinates: 55°38′N 13°12′E
- Country: Sweden
- County: Scania County
- Seat: Staffanstorp

Area
  - Total: 107.28 km^{2} (41.42 sq mi)
  - Land: 106.82 km^{2} (41.24 sq mi)
  - Water: 0.46 km^{2} (0.18 sq mi)
- Area as of 1 January 2014.

Population (30 June 2025)
  - Total: 27,381
  - Density: 256.33/km^{2} (663.89/sq mi)
- Time zone: UTC+1 (CET)
  - Summer (DST): UTC+2 (CEST)
- ISO 3166 code: SE
- Province: Scania
- Municipal code: 1230
- Website: www.staffanstorp.se

Staffanstorp Municipality (Swedish: Staffanstorps kommun) is a municipality in Scania County, southern Sweden. Its seat is located in the town Staffanstorp.

The municipality was formed by the local government reform of 1952, when 12 original units, created out of parishes in 1863, were amalgamated. The next reform in 1971 did not affect the size of this municipality.

In the municipality there are two localities which have grown into suburbs of Malmö: Staffanstorp, with 14,800 inhabitants, and Hjärup, with 4,000 inhabitants, which are both typical residential districts, dominated by detached houses built in the second half of the 20th century. Most residents commute from these areas for work in the nearby cities of Lund and Malmö.

== Localities ==
There were four localities in the municipality as of 2018.

Locality	Population
Staffanstorp	15,657
Hjärup	5,143
Bergströmshusen	398
Kyrkheddinge	261

== Demographics ==
This is a demographic table based on Staffanstorp Municipality's electoral districts in the 2022 Swedish general election sourced from SVT's election platform, in turn taken from SCB official statistics.

In total there were 26,211 residents, including 18,852 Swedish citizens of voting age. 39.1% voted for the left coalition and 60.0% for the right coalition. Indicators are in percentage points except population totals and income.

Location	Residents	Citizen adults	Left vote	Right vote	Employed	Swedish parents	Foreign heritage	Income SEK	Degree
Location			%	%					
Annero	1,603	1,180	38.3	61.2	85	81	19	30,145	49
Aspvägen	1,369	1,038	36.8	62.6	86	82	18	28,052	46
Borggård	1,483	1,122	34.6	64.9	84	80	20	28,015	43
Bråhög	1,684	1,164	40.5	57.9	73	62	38	22,819	31
Central N	1,247	860	36.5	62.1	84	78	22	24,330	42
Central S	1,415	1,203	39.7	59.3	80	83	17	24,115	39
Hagalid	1,786	1,229	37.6	61.3	84	75	25	28,117	45
Hjärup N	1,955	1,334	47.9	51.6	87	86	14	35,983	72
Hjärup S	1,638	1,133	46.8	52.8	88	88	12	35,713	75
Jakriborg	1,416	915	42.0	56.0	81	81	19	31,649	58
Kyrkbyn	1,560	1,252	35.5	63.6	84	80	20	29,128	41
Kyrkheddinge	1,258	922	34.6	64.8	83	82	18	29,968	49
Mellanvången	1,511	1,126	35.4	64.2	85	77	23	31,069	53
Stanstorp	1,197	887	43.4	56.4	87	85	15	27,800	50
Tottarp	1,605	1,136	32.6	64.9	81	81	19	31,115	47
Uppåkra	1,546	1,017	46.6	53.1	91	79	21	36,107	75
Vikhem	1,938	1,334	32.8	66.6	90	74	26	31,760	50
Source: SVT

== International relations ==
=== Twin towns – Sister cities ===
Staffanstorp is twinned with:

- (Germany) Grimmen
- (Italy) Ozzano dell'Emilia
- (Denmark) Vallensbæk
- (Estonia) Kohtla-Järve
- (Republic of Ireland) Killarney
- (Finland) Viitasaari
- (Poland) Wolin
