= Blåkulla =

Blåkulla is Swedish for "Blue hill", and may refer to:

- Blå Jungfrun, Swedish island in the Baltic Sea
- Blockula, legendary island where witches consort with the devil
- Blue residential buildings in Hagalund, Solna
- Residential area in Laholm
