= Inverness, Sweden =

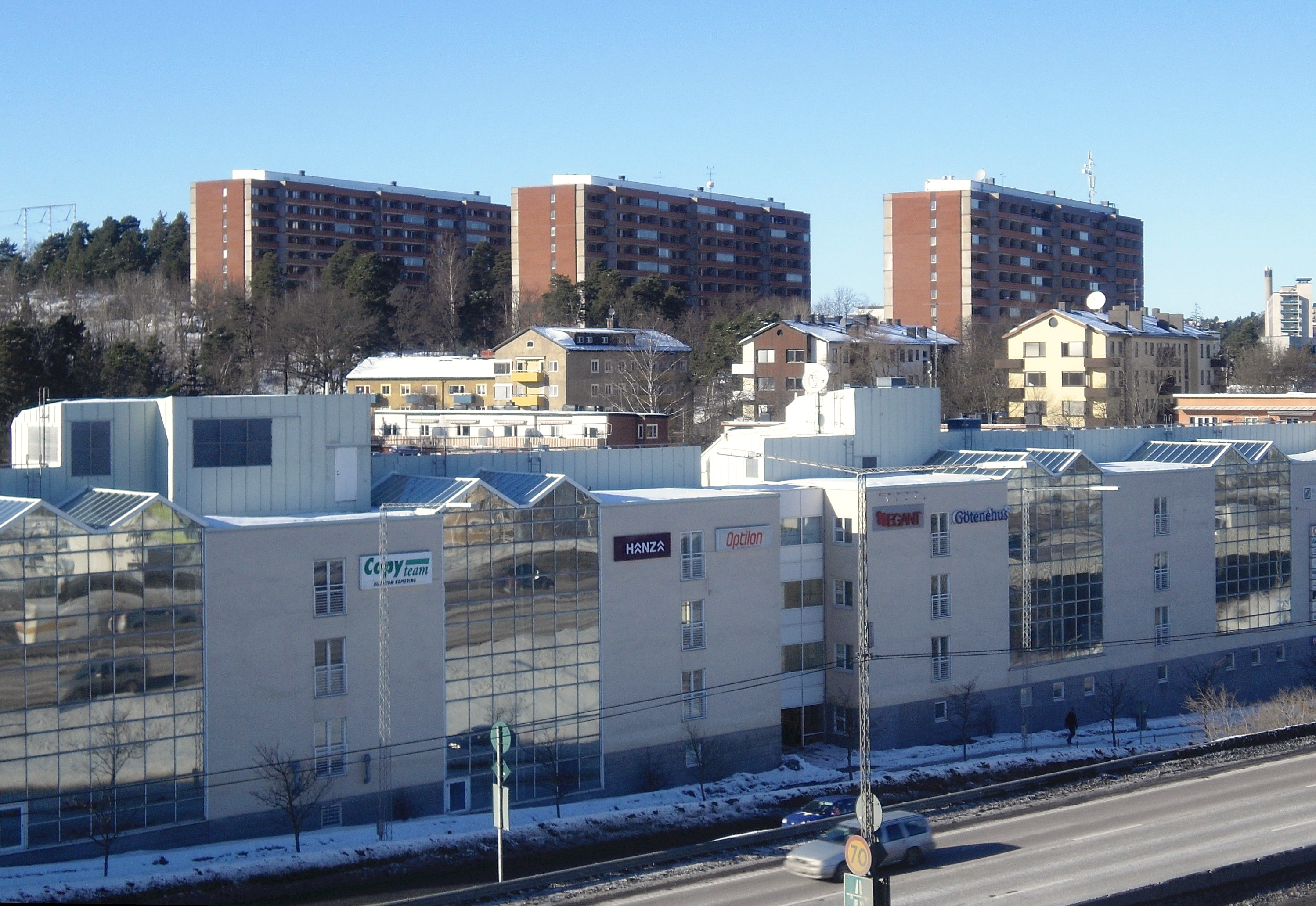
Inverness area in Stocksund as seen in 2010, seen from Sikreno. In the background is Mörbylund.

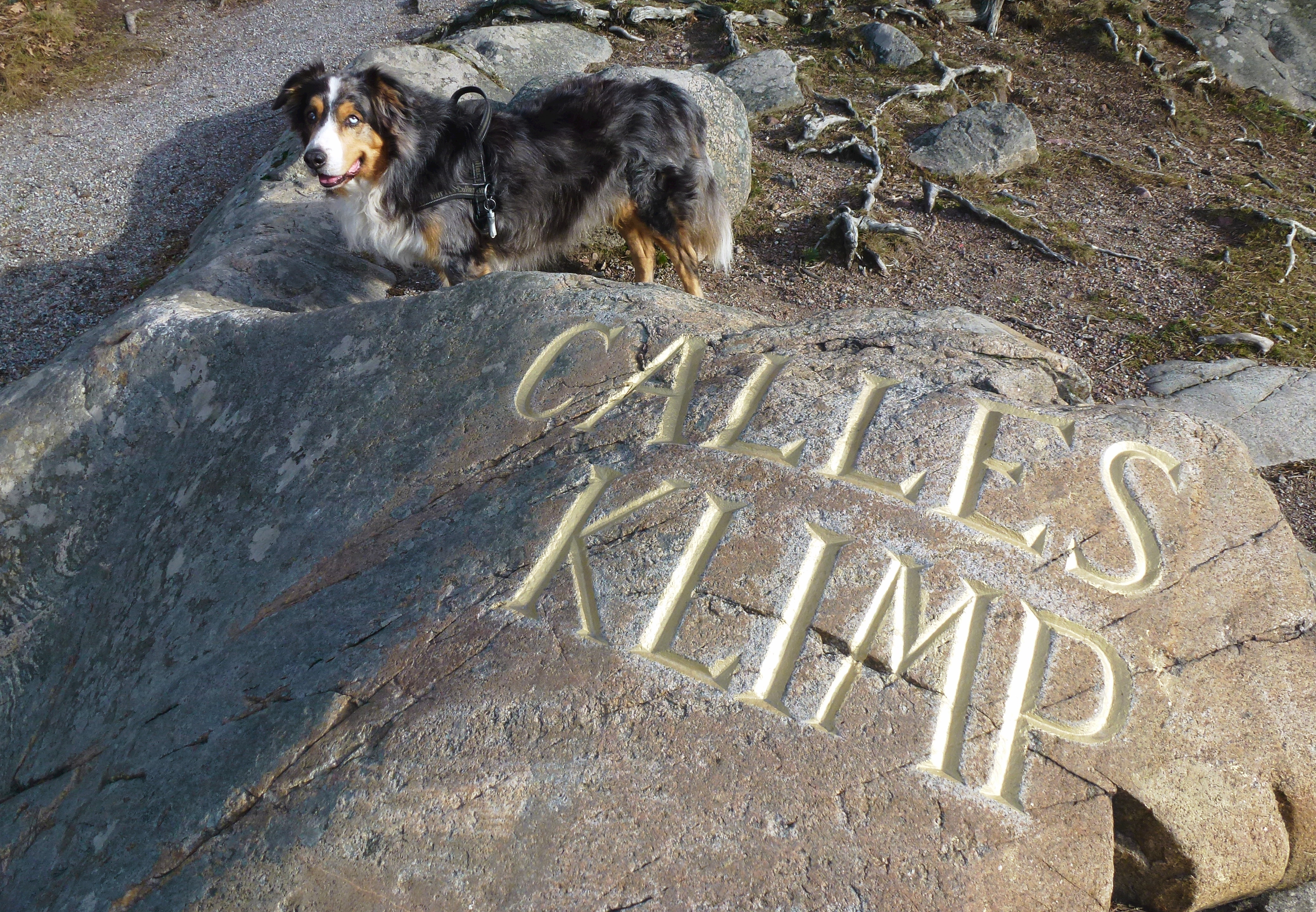
The memorial stone, "Calles klimp" (Calle's lump) in Inverness near Stocksundet in 2014.

Inverness (59°22′52″N 18°02′03″E) is a community located in upper-class suburb Stocksund in Danderyd Municipality in Metropolitan Stockholm, Sweden.
