= List of municipalities of Sweden by wealth =

This is a list of the municipalities of Sweden by average net wealth of its inhabitants in 2007 according to Statistics Sweden.

#	Municipality	Average net wealth ('000 SEK)
1	Danderyd Municipality	3,447
2	Lidingö Municipality	1,894
3	Täby Municipality	1,352
4	Vellinge Municipality	1,343
5	Båstad Municipality	1,267
6	Nacka Municipality	1,223
7	Lomma Municipality	1,163
8	Vaxholm Municipality	1,111
9	Stockholm Municipality	1,034
10	Ekerö Municipality	974
11	Värmdö Municipality	967
12	Sollentuna Municipality	942
13	Höganäs Municipality	927
14	Sotenäs Municipality	903
15	Simrishamn Municipality	871
16	Kungsbacka Municipality	853
17	Öckerö Municipality	839
18	Tjörn Municipality	807
19	Ydre Municipality	803
20	Tyresö Municipality	802
21	Tanum Municipality	794
22	Staffanstorp Municipality	770
23	Lund Municipality	760
24	Österåker Municipality	752
25	Norrtälje Municipality	746
26	Vallentuna Municipality	726
27	Tingsryd Municipality	717
28	Leksand Municipality	714
29	Ystad Municipality	712
30	Ängelholm Municipality	709
31	Åsele Municipality	708
32	Solna Municipality	708
33	Härryda Municipality	703
34	Svedala Municipality	703
35	Orust Municipality	696
36	Järfälla Municipality	691
37	Trosa Municipality	686
38	Borgholm Municipality	679
39	Knivsta Municipality	679
40	Kungälv Municipality	674
41	Falkenberg Municipality	668
42	Partille Municipality	666
43	Laholm Municipality	666
44	Lerum Municipality	665
45	Kävlinge Municipality	665
46	Trelleborg Municipality	656
47	Varberg Municipality	653
48	Kinda Municipality	652
49	Hylte Municipality	651
50	Ljungby Municipality	649
51	Älmhult Municipality	649
52	Mölndal Municipality	646
53	Gotland Municipality	637
54	Mörbylånga Municipality	637
55	Strömstad Municipality	636
56	Torsås Municipality	636
57	Vadstena Municipality	636
58	Valdemarsvik Municipality	633
59	Emmaboda Municipality	629
60	Alvesta Municipality	628
61	Halmstad Municipality	627
62	Markaryd Municipality	626
63	Bjurholm Municipality	625
64	Svalöv Municipality	624
65	Tomelilla Municipality	623
66	Skurup Municipality	622
67	Torsby Municipality	621
68	Uppsala Municipality	621
69	Lysekil Municipality	620
70	Huddinge Municipality	616
71	Ödeshög Municipality	614
72	Höör Municipality	610
73	Sävsjö Municipality	607
74	Bollebygd Municipality	599
75	Gnesta Municipality	595
76	Växjö Municipality	593
77	Vetlanda Municipality	593
78	Årjäng Municipality	591
79	Uppvidinge Municipality	591
80	Söderköping Municipality	589
81	Svenljunga Municipality	588
82	Östhammar Municipality	587
83	Vimmerby Municipality	584
84	Enköping Municipality	584
85	Hörby Municipality	583
86	Stenungsund Municipality	582
87	Värnamo Municipality	577
88	Tranemo Municipality	573
89	Grästorp Municipality	572
90	Sunne Municipality	571
91	Rättvik Municipality	569
92	Eslöv Municipality	568
93	Helsingborg Municipality	566
94	Sjöbo Municipality	565
95	Strängnäs Municipality	564
96	Alingsås Municipality	563
97	Säffle Municipality	562
98	Göteborg Municipality	555
99	Haninge Municipality	553
100	Nykvarn Municipality	552
101	Mora Municipality	551
102	Kristianstad Municipality	551
103	Osby Municipality	549
104	Linköping Municipality	547
105	Malung-Sälen Municipality	543
106	Ulricehamn Municipality	542
107	Vara Municipality	535
108	Salem Municipality	534
109	Örkelljunga Municipality	533
110	Lidköping Municipality	531
111	Kalmar Municipality	530
112	Malmö Municipality	525
113	Gnosjö Municipality	524
114	Herrljunga Municipality	522
115	Hässleholm Municipality	521
116	Nybro Municipality	520
117	Nyköping Municipality	520
118	Dals-Ed Municipality	517
119	Jönköping Municipality	517
120	Sigtuna Municipality	517
121	Upplands Väsby Municipality	514
122	Bengtsfors Municipality	513
123	Upplands-Bro Municipality	512
124	Nynäshamn Municipality	511
125	Åre Municipality	510
126	Vaggeryd Municipality	510
127	Eksjö Municipality	509
128	Heby Municipality	508
129	Gislaved Municipality	507
130	Färgelanda Municipality	501
131	Krokom Municipality	500
132	Sölvesborg Municipality	500
133	Vårgårda Municipality	497
134	Lekeberg Municipality	495
135	Götene Municipality	494
136	Flen Municipality	494
137	Håbo Municipality	492
138	Aneby Municipality	491
139	Högsby Municipality	490
140	Mark Municipality	489
141	Burlöv Municipality	489
142	Umeå Municipality	486
143	Hjo Municipality	486
144	Vindeln Municipality	483
145	Essunga Municipality	483
146	Falun Municipality	482
147	Karlskrona Municipality	479
148	Åtvidaberg Municipality	478
149	Karlshamn Municipality	477
150	Ronneby Municipality	477
151	Ale Municipality	476
152	Oskarshamn Municipality	476
153	Munkedal Municipality	475
154	Mellerud Municipality	472
155	Nordmaling Municipality	471
156	Östersund Municipality	468
157	Sala Municipality	468
158	Arvika Municipality	468
159	Uddevalla Municipality	468
160	Nässjö Municipality	465
161	Hammarö Municipality	464
162	Mjölby Municipality	464
163	Västerås Municipality	461
164	Hultsfred Municipality	458
165	Örnsköldsvik Municipality	457
166	Karlstad Municipality	457
167	Falköping Municipality	457
168	Askersund Municipality	455
169	Vänersborg Municipality	453
170	Klippan Municipality	452
171	Östra Göinge Municipality	449
172	Skellefteå Municipality	447
173	Skara Municipality	447
174	Robertsfors Municipality	446
175	Gagnef Municipality	445
176	Boxholm Municipality	444
177	Olofström Municipality	443
178	Berg Municipality	441
179	Sundbyberg Municipality	439
180	Eda Municipality	438
181	Mönsterås Municipality	437
182	Vansbro Municipality	432
183	Örebro Municipality	432
184	Säter Municipality	430
185	Borås Municipality	430
186	Västervik Municipality	430
187	Tierp Municipality	430
188	Orsa Municipality	429
189	Gullspång Municipality	429
190	Vännäs Municipality	426
191	Perstorp Municipality	424
192	Ovanåker Municipality	423
193	Motala Municipality	420
194	Tidaholm Municipality	419
195	Landskrona Municipality	417
196	Älvdalen Municipality	414
197	Trollhättan Municipality	413
198	Pajala Municipality	412
199	Habo Municipality	412
200	Finspång Municipality	412
201	Hudiksvall Municipality	411
202	Skövde Municipality	411
203	Mariestad Municipality	411
204	Härjedalen Municipality	410
205	Norrköping Municipality	410
206	Tranås Municipality	409
207	Luleå Municipality	408
208	Katrineholm Municipality	408
209	Norsjö Municipality	407
210	Gävle Municipality	406
211	Ånge Municipality	405
212	Arboga Municipality	404
213	Ockelbo Municipality	403
214	Bräcke Municipality	399
215	Eskilstuna Municipality	397
216	Åmål Municipality	396
217	Övertorneå Municipality	395
218	Södertälje Municipality	394
219	Sandviken Municipality	392
220	Ljusdal Municipality	392
221	Töreboda Municipality	389
222	Lessebo Municipality	386
223	Sundsvall Municipality	385
224	Lindesberg Municipality	385
225	Vingåker Municipality	385
226	Borlänge Municipality	384
227	Ragunda Municipality	383
228	Lilla Edet Municipality	382
229	Kil Municipality	381
230	Bollnäs Municipality	376
231	Nora Municipality	374
232	Bromölla Municipality	373
233	Hallsberg Municipality	371
234	Karlsborg Municipality	368
235	Sorsele Municipality	367
236	Storuman Municipality	365
237	Tibro Municipality	365
238	Botkyrka Municipality	365
239	Hedemora Municipality	363
240	Piteå Municipality	358
241	Köping Municipality	358
242	Oxelösund Municipality	358
243	Smedjebacken Municipality	356
244	Hagfors Municipality	352
245	Gällivare Municipality	350
246	Nordanstig Municipality	350
247	Kungsör Municipality	347
248	Avesta Municipality	346
249	Hallstahammar Municipality	343
250	Skinnskatteberg Municipality	343
251	Bjuv Municipality	342
252	Kumla Municipality	341
253	Strömsund Municipality	340
254	Grums Municipality	340
255	Åstorp Municipality	338
256	Laxå Municipality	335
257	Mullsjö Municipality	334
258	Dorotea Municipality	333
259	Sollefteå Municipality	333
260	Kristinehamn Municipality	331
261	Vilhelmina Municipality	330
262	Härnösand Municipality	322
263	Malå Municipality	321
264	Karlskoga Municipality	321
265	Lycksele Municipality	320
266	Älvkarleby Municipality	317
267	Kalix Municipality	316
268	Överkalix Municipality	316
269	Söderhamn Municipality	314
270	Arjeplog Municipality	313
271	Ludvika Municipality	312
272	Filipstad Municipality	310
273	Kramfors Municipality	308
274	Haparanda Municipality	303
275	Storfors Municipality	301
276	Älvsbyn Municipality	299
277	Arvidsjaur Municipality	299
278	Norberg Municipality	294
279	Boden Municipality	291
280	Kiruna Municipality	284
281	Hällefors Municipality	284
282	Forshaga Municipality	280
283	Degerfors Municipality	279
284	Hofors Municipality	276
285	Fagersta Municipality	274
286	Timrå Municipality	273
287	Surahammar Municipality	271
288	Ljusnarsberg Municipality	259
289	Munkfors Municipality	257
290	Jokkmokk Municipality	240
