= Brunnsviken =

Lake in Sweden

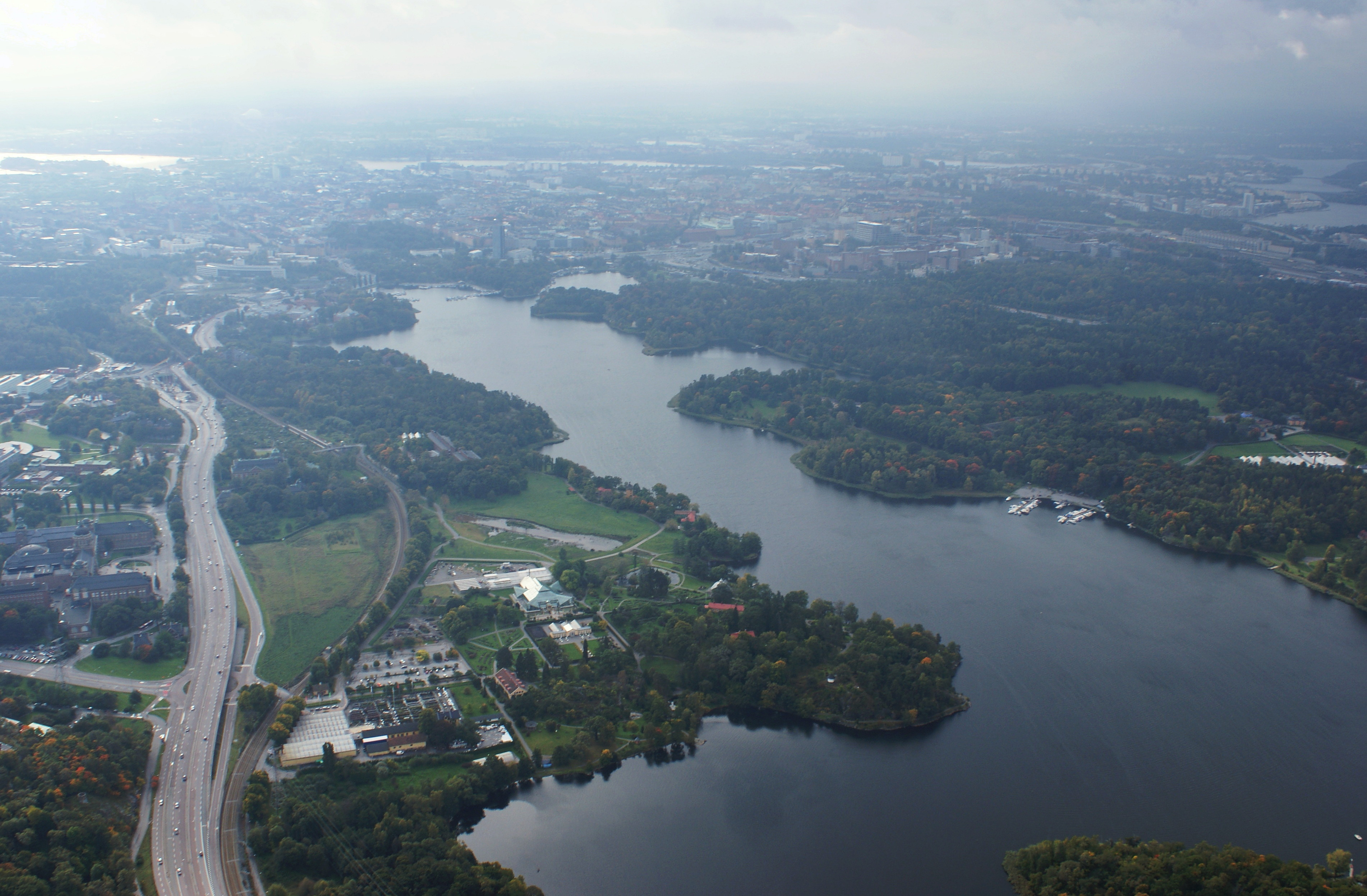
- Aerial view from the north with the City of Stockholm at the end of the bay (top)

- Location within Stockholm
- Location: Sweden
- Coordinates: 59°22.2′N 18°2.3′E
- Type: lake
- Max. length: 3.5 kilometres (2.2 mi)
- Max. width: 0.4–0.5 kilometres (0.25–0.31 mi)
- Shore length^{1}: 12 kilometres (7.5 mi)
- ^{1} Shore length is not a well-defined measure.

Brunnsviken (literally The Bay of Wells) is a brackish lake in Sweden. It is located on the boundary between Solna Municipality and Stockholm Municipality, connecting to Lilla Värtan through Ålkistan. At 3.5 km (2.2 mi) by 0.4–0.5 km (0.25–0.31 mi), it has a perimeter of 12 km (7.5 mi).

Around Brunnsviken there are a wide range of buildings and facilities. Brunnsviken stretches all the way from Vasastaden, Stockholm in the south to Bergshamra, Solna in the north, with Hagaparken along the western shoreline. In the 1700s, Gustav III had plans to build a continuous belt of English parks around the lake.

Since 1994, Brunnsviken has been a part of the Royal National City Park.
