= Stocksund =

Residential area in Danderyd, Sweden

Coordinates: 59°23′N 18°04′E

Coat of arms of Stocksund from its time as a separate municipality

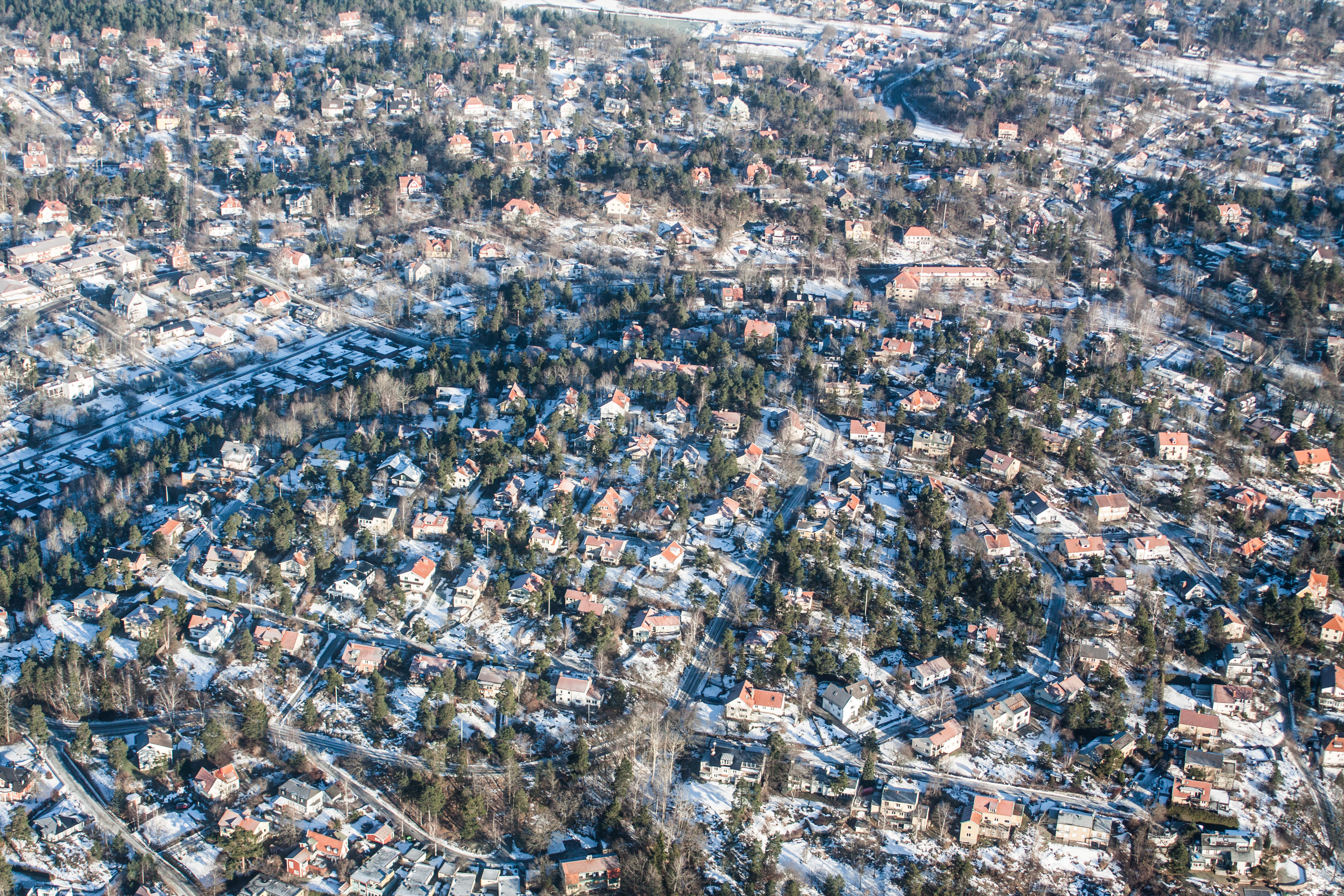
Aerophoto over Stocksund in February 2013

Stocksund (Swedish pronunciation: [stɔkˈsɵnːd]) is an upper-class suburb in Metropolitan Stockholm, Sweden.

Located immediately across the Edsviken and Stocksundet from Bergshamra, Stocksund is one of four parts of Danderyd Municipality north of Stockholm, which is the most affluent municipality of Sweden. Average real estate prices for houses are the highest in Sweden, similar to the neighbouring Djursholm. It was the site of the Stocksund Studios film and television studios based in a former power station.

Glenstudio, where the group ABBA recorded the album ABBA, is located in Långängen, a part of Stocksund.

== Communications ==
Stocksund is served by two railway stations on Roslagsbanan: Stocksund railway station and Mörby railway station.

== See also ==
- Inverness, Sweden
