= Ålkistan =

Canal and the surrounding area in Sweden

Coordinates: 59°22′32″N 18°02′49″E

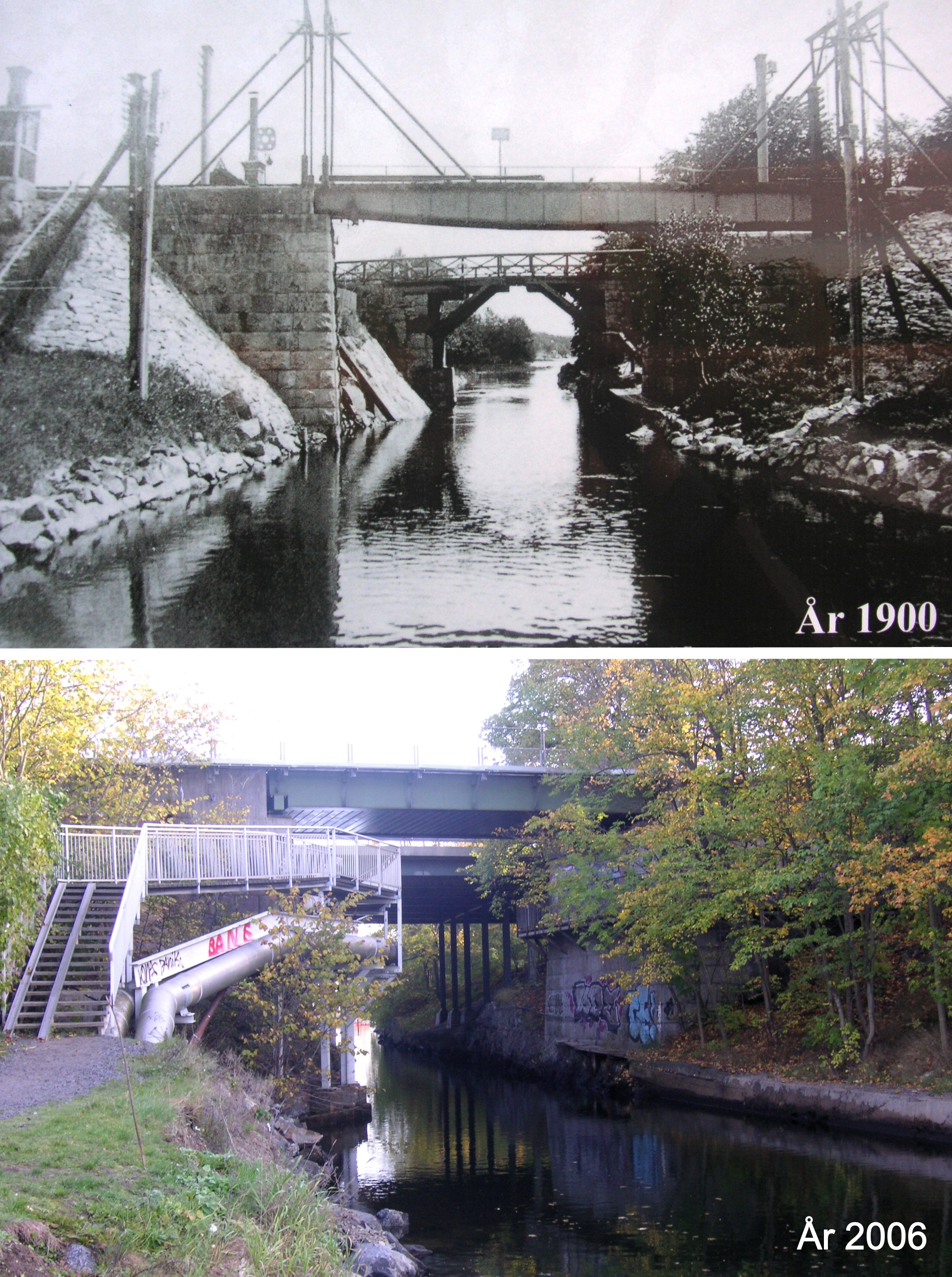
Ålkistan in 1900 and 2006.

Ålkistan (Swedish: "The Eel Hatch") is the name of a canal, and the surrounding area, north of Stockholm, Sweden. The canal connects Lilla Värtan to Lake Brunnsviken, and delimits Bergshamra, the northern part of Solna, from the northern part of Djurgården.

The name Ålkistan first appears on a map of Djurgården dated 1649, pointing out Åhlekijstetorpet ("The Eel Hatch Cottage"), Åhlekijstebackan ("The Eel Hatch Hillside") and Åhlekijste wijken ("The Eel Hatch Bay"). In a rivulet leading to the bay eels were caught using cages (in Swedish called kista, "coffin"), which gave the area its present name. The cottage is mentioned as a tavern in 1789.

By the mid-19th century, mud threatened to cork the rivulet, which would effectively have turned Lake Brunnsviken, being used as refuse dump as it was, into a sewer. King Charles XV therefore ordered the present canal to be constructed in 1863, which lowered the water level of Brunnsviken by two metres. A 6.5-metre-wide (21 ft) wooden bridge with a mobile flap leading over the canal was added at the same time. The bridge was substituted in 1937 by a 23-metre-wide (75 ft) bridge with an 18-metre-wide (59 ft) roadway and a horizontal clearance of 8 metres, rebuilt in 1972.

There was a railway stop at Ålkistan from 1885 until 1923, at the Roslag Railway. The railway is still operational, but the trains do not stop at Ålkistan anymore.

As of 2007, no ships wider than 4.0 metres or deeper than 1.6 metres are allowed in the canal. Next to Ålkistan is a residential area, Sfären ("The Sphere"), with a local centre.

== See also ==
- Geography of Stockholm
- Royal National City Park
