= Stocksund railway station =

Railway station in Danderyd, Sweden

Stocksund
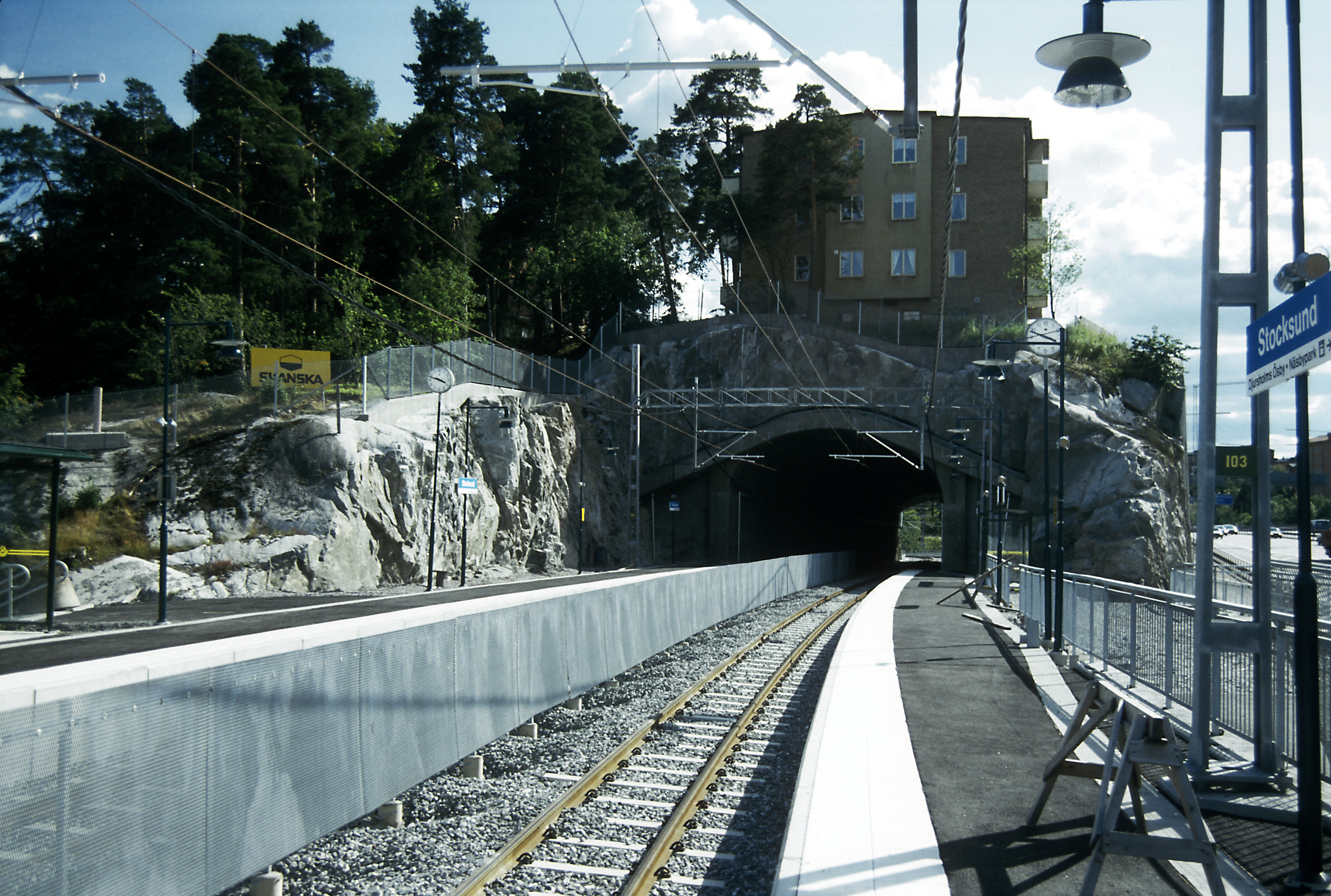
- The present Stocksund station, view from the north.

General information
- Location: Stocksund, Danderyd Municipality; Sweden
- Coordinates: 59.3848°N 18.0438°E
- System: Roslagsbanan railway station
- Line: Roslagsbanan
- Platforms: 2 side platforms

Construction
- Structure type: At grade
- Accessible: Yes

History
- Opened: 1890
- Rebuilt: 1904, 1996

Passengers
- 2019: 350 boarding per weekday

Services
Preceding station	SL Local & Light Rail	Following station
Universitetet towards Stockholms östra	Roslagsbanan Line 29	Mörby towards Näsbypark
Location

Stocksund railway station is a railway station at Roslagsbanan, serving Stocksund in Danderyd Municipality, a bit north of Stockholm.

Stocksund station is now a simple railway stop, where only the trains on the way between Stockholms östra railway station and Näsbypark stop. It is situated 4.6 km from Stockholm Östra station.

== History ==
The original Stocksund railway station was situated some hundred metres to the south east of the present one and was opened in 1890. The station building there was built in 1904. Sigge Cronstedt was the architect for this and other station buildings along Roslagsbanan.

Stocksund railway station used to be a junction, connecting the railway to a short standard gauge tram line through Stocksund, the so-called Långängsbanan terminating at Långängen, and there were also tracks to the Stocksund harbour, which was just nearby the railway station. The tram line was intended to be the beginning of a big tram rail network in Stocksund and Djursholm and also to be connected to the Stockholm city tram network, but of this came naught and in 1934 the tracks were converted to the narrow gauge of Roslagsbanan so the same waggons could be used. In 1966 the tram line was finally closed and the connection to the harbour was also closed, making Stocksund just a stop for passenger traffic on Roslagsbanan.

This old station was closed in 1996, replaced by a new station by the same name some hundred metres to the north west, set where a new bridge over Stocksundet and a new, straighter line of the railway allows higher speed for the trains.

== Gallery ==
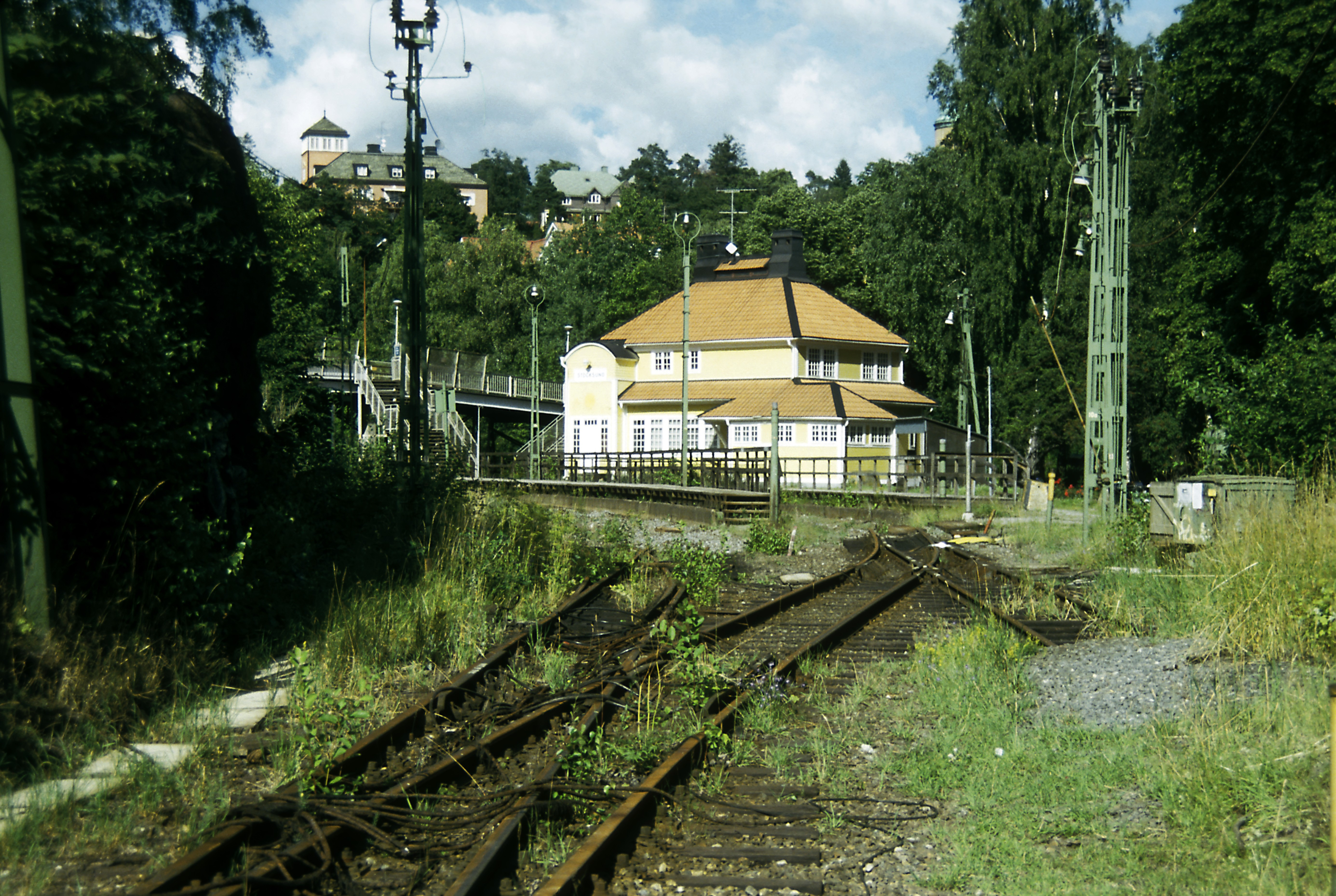
The former Stocksund station, view from southwest. Service in the station building ceased in the 1970s and the station was moved from this location in 1996, but as of 2013, the building remains active.

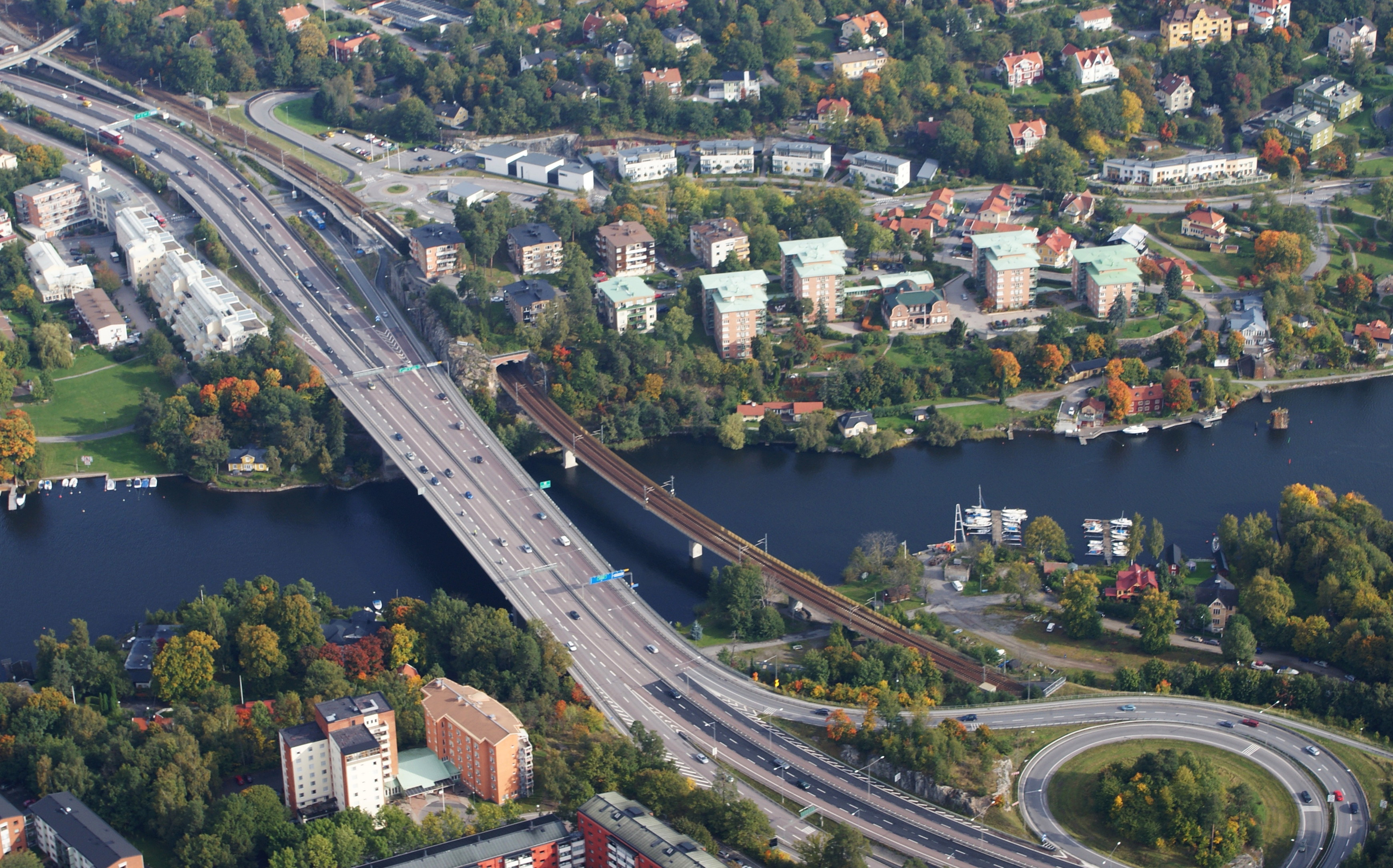
Stocksundet from southwest, with the motorway bridge and the present railway bridge in the centre of the image, and pylons for the old railway bridge and the old station building seen to the right. (September 2012)
