= Långängen =

Coordinates: 59.383°N 18.069°E

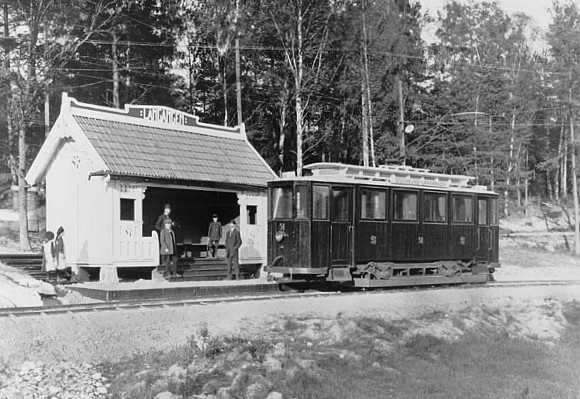
The tram line from the early days of residential buildings in Långängen

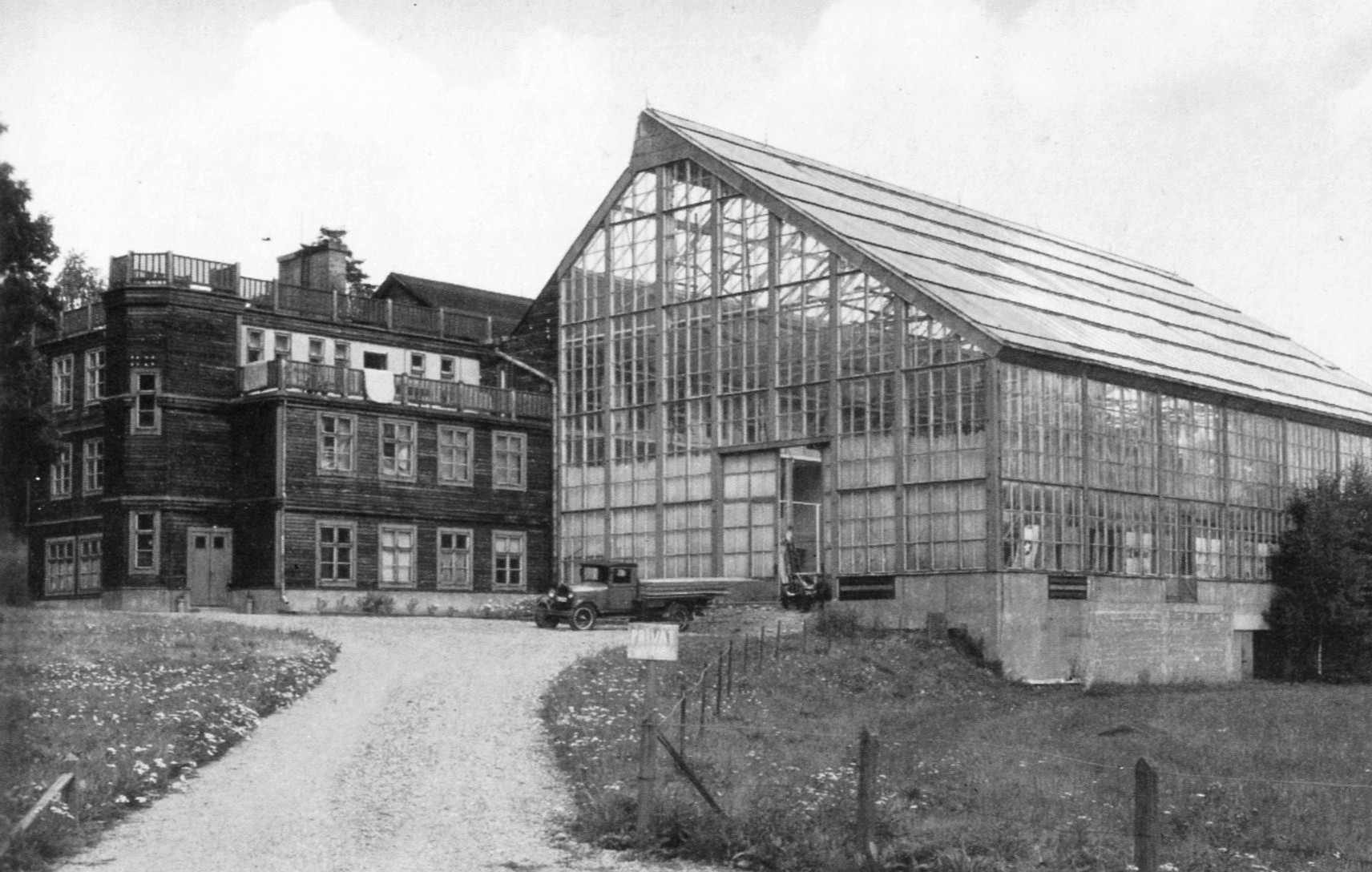
Skandiafilm Studio in Långängen in 1918

Långängen is a residential area in Stocksund in Danderyd Municipality in Sweden. It used to have service by a tramway connected to Stocksund railway station at Roslagsbanan but is now serviced with buses instead.

Långängen was an important site for the early Swedish movie industry, with Skandiafilm's (sv) studio situated there in the early 20th century. Glen Studios, a music studio where the album ABBA was recorded, was situated in Långängen in the 1970s.
