= Stigens IF =

Swedish football club

- Full name: Stigens Idrottsförening
- Ground: Nya Stigevi; Stigen; Sweden
- Chairman: Lars Andersson
- League: Division 4 Bohuslän/Dalsland
Home colours	Away colours

Stigens IF is a Swedish football club located in Stigen.

== Background ==
Stigens IF currently plays in Division 5 Dalsland which is the seventh tier of Swedish football. They play their home matches at the Nya Stigevi in Stigen.

The club is affiliated to Dalslands Fotbollförbund. Stigens IF have competed in the Svenska Cupen on 2 occasions and have played 2 matches in the competition.

== Season to season ==
In their most successful period Stigens IF competed in the following divisions:

Season	Level	Division	Section	Position	Movements
1940–41	Tier 3	Division 3	Nordvästra Södra	7th	
1941–42	Tier 3	Division 3	Nordvästra Södra, Dalsland	3rd	
1942–43	Tier 3	Division 3	Nordvästra Södra, Dalsland	7th	
1943–44	Tier 3	Division 3	Nordvästra Södra, Dalsland	4th	
1944–45	Tier 3	Division 3	Nordvästra Södra, Dalsland	8th	Relegated

In recent seasons Stigens IF have competed in the following divisions:

Season	Level	Division	Section	Position	Movements
2007	Tier 8	Division 6	Dalsland	1st	Promoted
2008	Tier 7	Division 5	Dalsland	2nd	
2009	Tier 7	Division 5	Dalsland	1st	Promoted
2010	Tier 6	Division 4	Bohuslän/Dalsland	8th	
2011	Tier 6	Division 4	Bohuslän/Dalsland	10th	
