= Stigen =

- Location within Västra Götaland Location within Sweden
- Coordinates: 58°34′N 12°04′E
- Country: Sweden
- Province: Dalsland
- County: Västra Götaland County
- Municipality: Färgelanda Municipality

Area
  - Total: 0.70 km^{2} (0.27 sq mi)

Population (31 December 2010)
  - Total: 428
  - Density: 610/km^{2} (1,600/sq mi)
- Time zone: UTC+1 (CET)
  - Summer (DST): UTC+2 (CEST)
- Climate: Cfb

Stigen is a locality situated in Färgelanda Municipality, Västra Götaland County, Sweden. It had 428 inhabitants in 2010.

== Sports ==
The following sports clubs are located in Stigen:

- Stigens IF
