= Hagalund =

Coordinates: 59°21′43.93″N 18°0′42.12″E

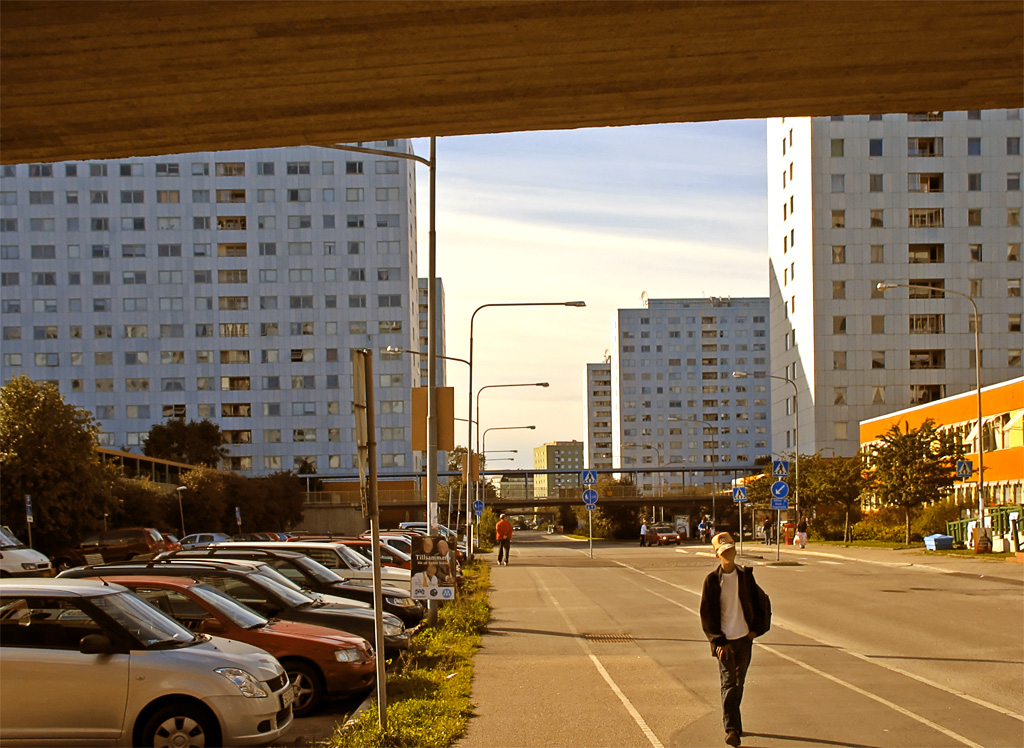
Hagalund.

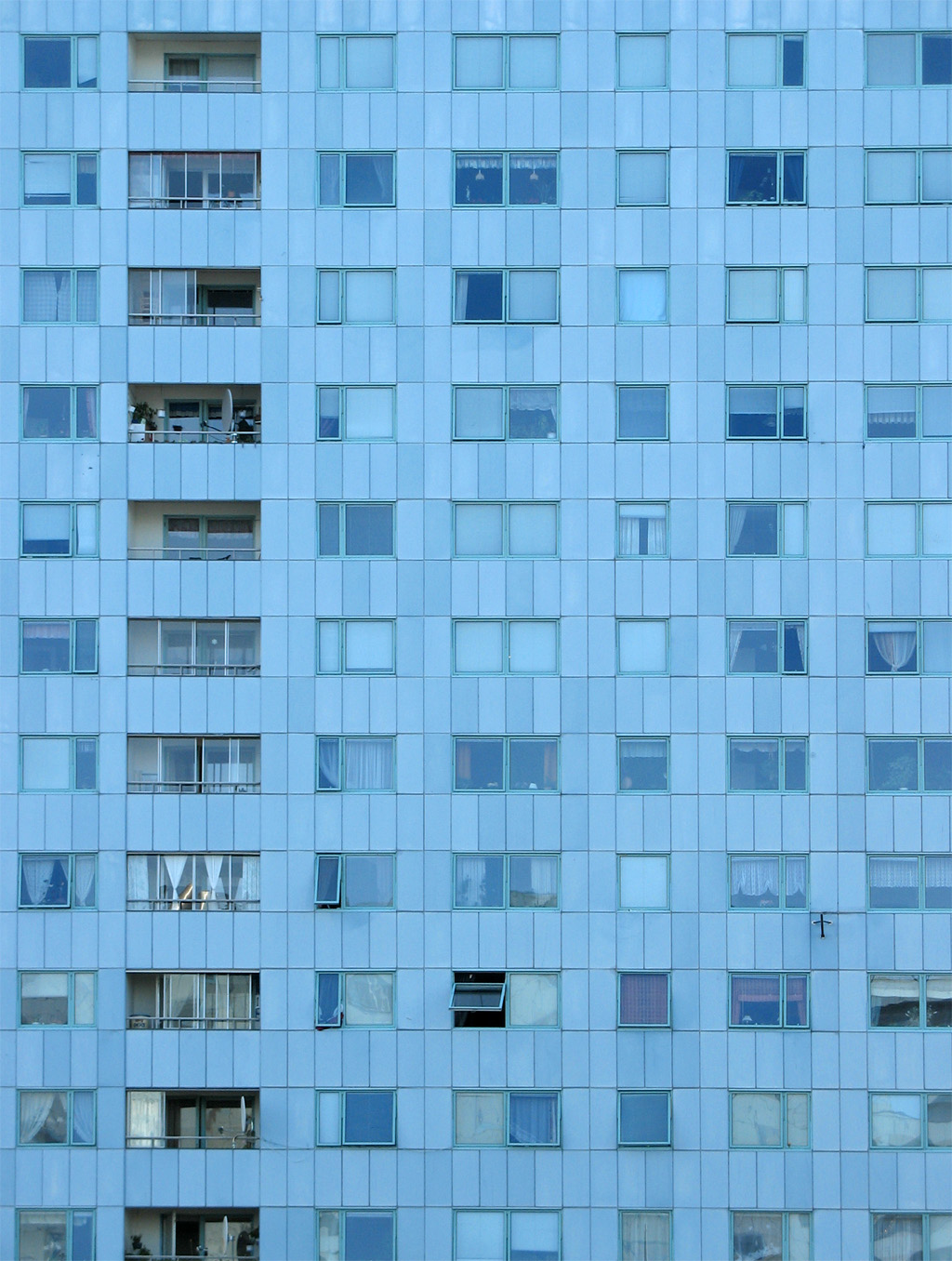
Blue highrise building.

Hagalund is a residential area and railway yard in Solna Municipality, 5 km north of central Stockholm. It is known for the blue highrise buildings "Blåkulla" (Blue Hill or Blockula) which, against a rather strong and long-lasting opinion, in the beginning of the 1970s replaced a picturesque working-class and craftsman neighbourhood built in the 1890s and portrayed by artist Olle Olsson Hagalund. There are still about half a dozen old houses preserved, a minor area called Gamla Hagalund (Old Hagalund) in the eastern part of the area.

It has eight large light-blue residential buildings that consist of 13 floors and an extra roof floor. The houses can be seen from Kaknästornet.

Hagalund also houses Sweden's largest railway depot (sv:Hagalunds bangård) which opened in 1916 on the East Coast Line to consolidate all the previous railway depots in the Stockholm area.

Hagalund is close to Solna centrum, about 1 kilometer. It is also near Haga Palace which is in Hagaparken. It is near the new Swedish national stadium Strawberry Arena. It is not very far away from Karolinska University Hospital.

It is not far away from Huvudsta and Bergshamra, Solna.
