= Högsäter =

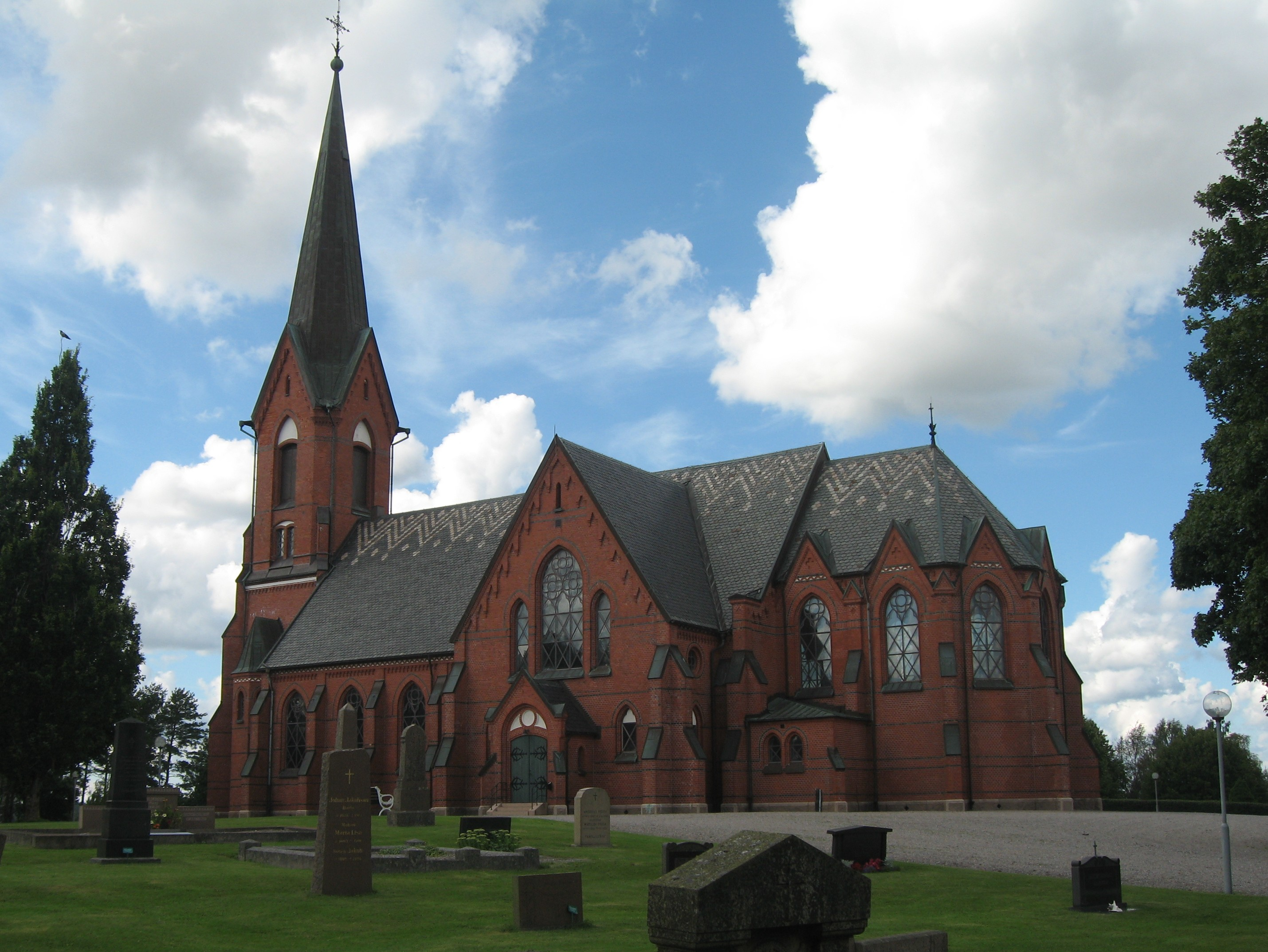

- Location within Västra Götaland Location within Sweden
- Coordinates: 58°39′N 12°03′E
- Country: Sweden
- Province: Dalsland
- County: Västra Götaland County
- Municipality: Färgelanda Municipality

Area
  - Total: 1.0478 km^{2} (0.4046 sq mi)

Population (31 December 2010)
  - Total: 705
  - Density: 673/km^{2} (1,740/sq mi)
- Time zone: UTC+1 (CET)
  - Summer (DST): UTC+2 (CEST)
- Postal code: 45870
- Area code: 0528
- Climate: Dfb

Högsäter is a locality situated in Färgelanda Municipality, Västra Götaland County, Sweden. It had 705 inhabitants in 2010.
