= Ödeborg =

- Location within Västra Götaland Location within Sweden
- Coordinates: 58°32′42″N 11°58′28″E
- Country: Sweden
- Province: Dalsland
- County: Västra Götaland County
- Municipality: Färgelanda Municipality

Area
  - Total: 0.74 km^{2} (0.29 sq mi)

Population (31 December 2010)
  - Total: 598
  - Density: 805/km^{2} (2,080/sq mi)
- Time zone: UTC+1 (CET)
  - Summer (DST): UTC+2 (CEST)
- Climate: Cfb

Ödeborg (Swedish pronunciation: [ˈø̂ːdɛˌbɔrj]) is a locality situated in Färgelanda Municipality, Västra Götaland County, Sweden. It had 598 inhabitants in 2010.
