= Färgelanda =

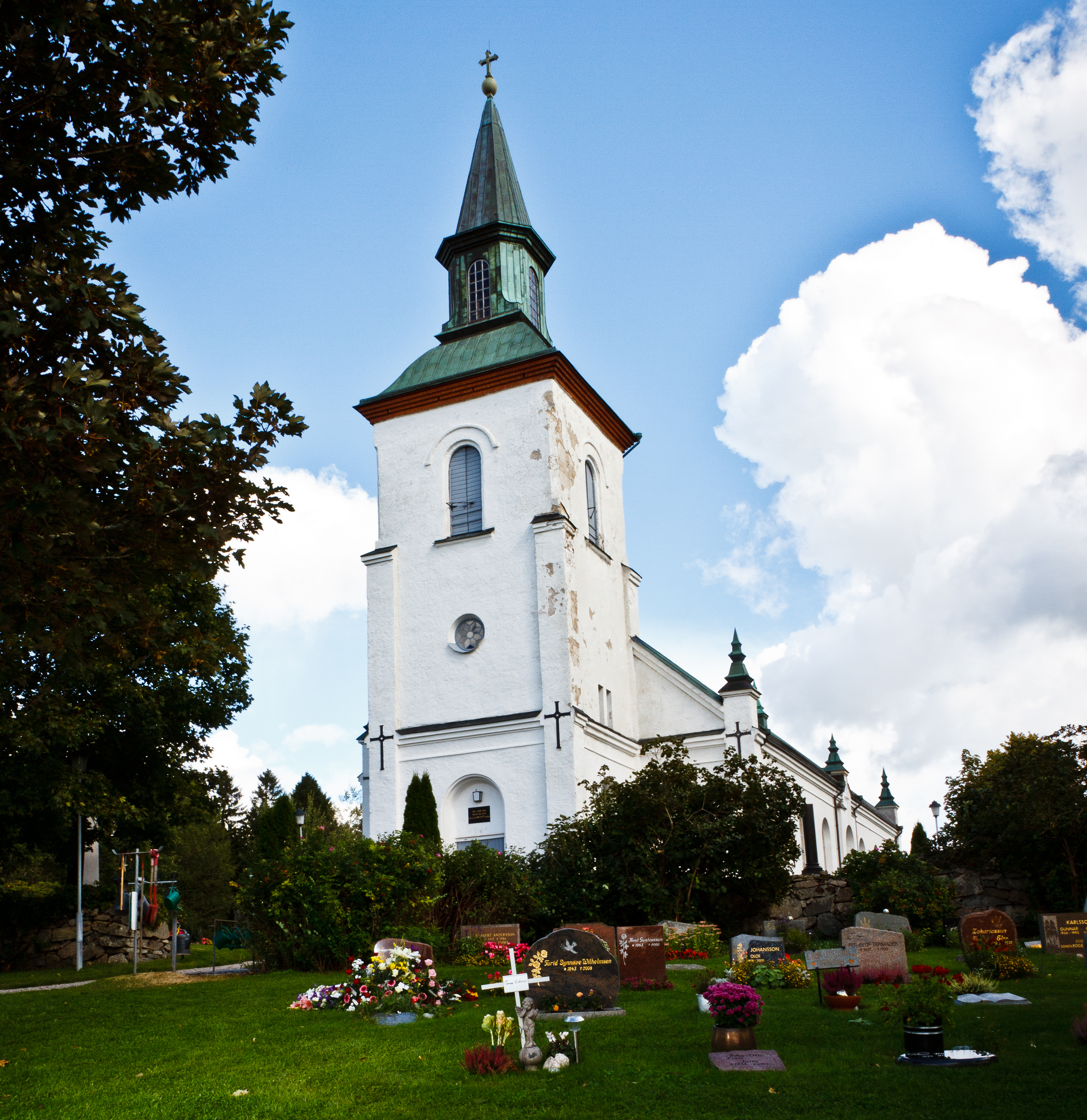
- Färgelanda Church

- Location within Västra Götaland Location within Sweden
- Coordinates: 58°34′N 11°59′E
- Country: Sweden
- Province: Dalsland
- County: Västra Götaland County
- Municipality: Färgelanda Municipality

Area
  - Total: 2.10 km^{2} (0.81 sq mi)

Population (31 December 2010)
  - Total: 1,894
  - Density: 900/km^{2} (2,300/sq mi)
- Time zone: UTC+1 (CET)
  - Summer (DST): UTC+2 (CEST)
- Climate: Cfb

Färgelanda is a locality and the seat of Färgelanda Municipality, Västra Götaland County, Sweden. It had 1,894 inhabitants in 2010.
