= Färgelanda Municipality =

Färgelanda Municipality Färgelanda kommun
- Municipality
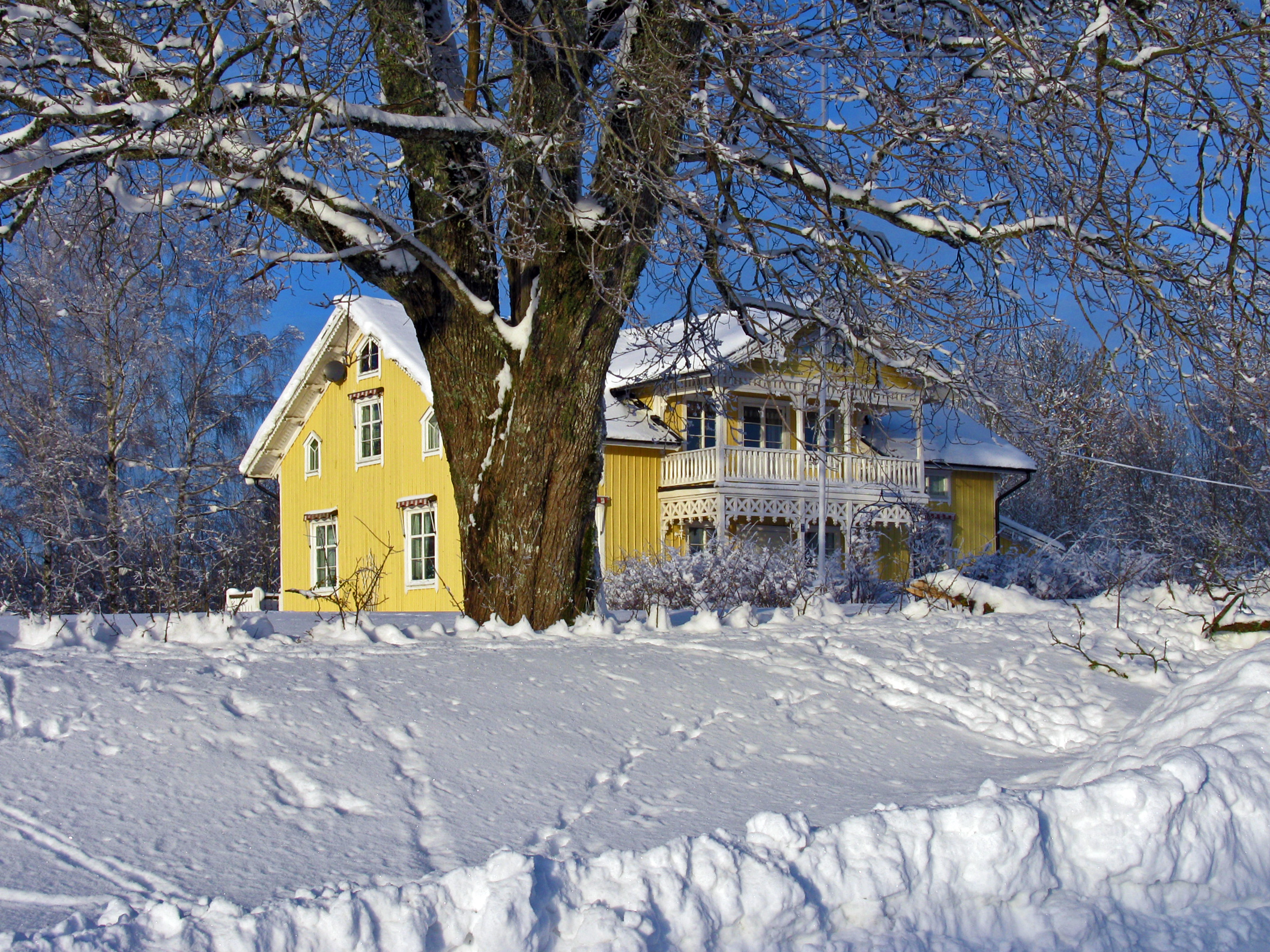

- Coat of arms

- Coordinates: 58°34′N 11°59′E
- Country: Sweden
- County: Västra Götaland County
- Seat: Färgelanda

Area
  - Total: 618.33 km^{2} (238.74 sq mi)
  - Land: 588.98 km^{2} (227.41 sq mi)
  - Water: 29.35 km^{2} (11.33 sq mi)
- Area as of 1 January 2014.

Population (30 June 2025)
  - Total: 6,327
  - Density: 10.74/km^{2} (27.82/sq mi)
- Time zone: UTC+1 (CET)
  - Summer (DST): UTC+2 (CEST)
- ISO 3166 code: SE
- Province: Dalsland
- Municipal code: 1439
- Website: www.fargelanda.se
- Density is calculated using land area only.

Färgelanda Municipality (Swedish: Färgelanda kommun) is a municipality in Västra Götaland County in western Sweden. Its seat is in the town of Färgelanda.

The present municipality was formed in 1974 when "old" Färgelanda Municipality (which in 1967 had absorbed Ödeborg) was amalgamated with Högsäter.

Its coat of arms is based on a medieval seal depicting a harrow, symbolizing agriculture.

== Localities ==
- Färgelanda 2,000 (seat)
- Högsäter 750
- Ödeborg 700
- Stigen 350

== Demographics ==
This is a demographic table based on Färgelanda Municipality's electoral districts in the 2022 Swedish general election sourced from SVT's election platform, in turn taken from SCB official statistics.

In total there were 6,577 residents, including 5,021 Swedish citizens of voting age in the municipality. 38.3% voted for the left coalition and 60.5% for the right coalition. Indicators are in percentage points except population totals and income.

Location	Residents	Citizen adults	Left vote	Right vote	Employed	Swedish parents	Foreign heritage	Income SEK	Degree
Location			%	%					
Färgelanda landsbygd	1,741	1,288	41.4	57.4	76	83	17	23,107	22
Färgelanda tätort	1,391	1,079	45.8	53.2	72	84	16	22,074	21
Högsäter	2,094	1,583	30.2	68.4	80	87	13	22,931	26
Ödeborg-Torp	1,351	1,071	40.2	59.1	85	89	11	25,414	26
Source: SVT

== Tourism ==
The scarcely populated municipalities in the historical province of Dalsland, with a total of 50,000 inhabitants, have a unified tourism information. Färgelanda with its low population is preferring to boast its nature. There are several opportunities for fishing, and Ellenösjön is a popular lake for pikeperch fishing. The nature reserve in Kroppefjäll offers walking lines and a mountainous nature. There is canoeing and swimming in the many lakes and streams.

Färgelanda also has an old and well-preserved ancient history. Rock carvings in Ödeborg are located by Brötegården Museum; furthermore there are some 140 grave fields from the Iron Age scattered in the municipality. Something in between a museum and a folk museum is Ödeborg's Fornsal, with more than 6,000 objects gathered from Dalsland in the last millennia.
