= Stocksundet =

Strait in Stockholm County, Sweden

Coordinates: 59°23′00″N 18°02′26″E

Stocksundet is a strait in Stockholm County in Sweden. It connects the Edsviken sea inlet, to the west, with the Lilla Värtan strait and eventually the Baltic Sea, to the east. The strait also forms the border between the suburb of Stocksund in Danderyd Municipality, to the north, and the suburb of Bergshamra in Solna Municipality, to the south. The strait is approximately 2 kilometres (1.2 mi) long and varies in width between 90 metres (300 ft) and 250 metres (820 ft), whilst its depth varies between 6 metres (20 ft) and 15 metres (49 ft).

Stocksundet is supposed to have received its name from the logs (Swedish: "stock") which used to be laid out in the water to stop invading ships in the Early Middle Ages. This name then led to the place name of Stocksund, on the north side of the sound, and to the heraldry shield of the then Stocksund Municipality between 1955 and 1966.

By the 1400s, the road between Roslagen and Stockholm crossed Stocksundet, and by the 17th century, a ferry was provided. In 1716 the first bridge across the Stocksundet was built, principally to facilitate the movement of troops to the west in the event of an attack by Russia. Since then, there have been a total of seven bridges built across the strait.

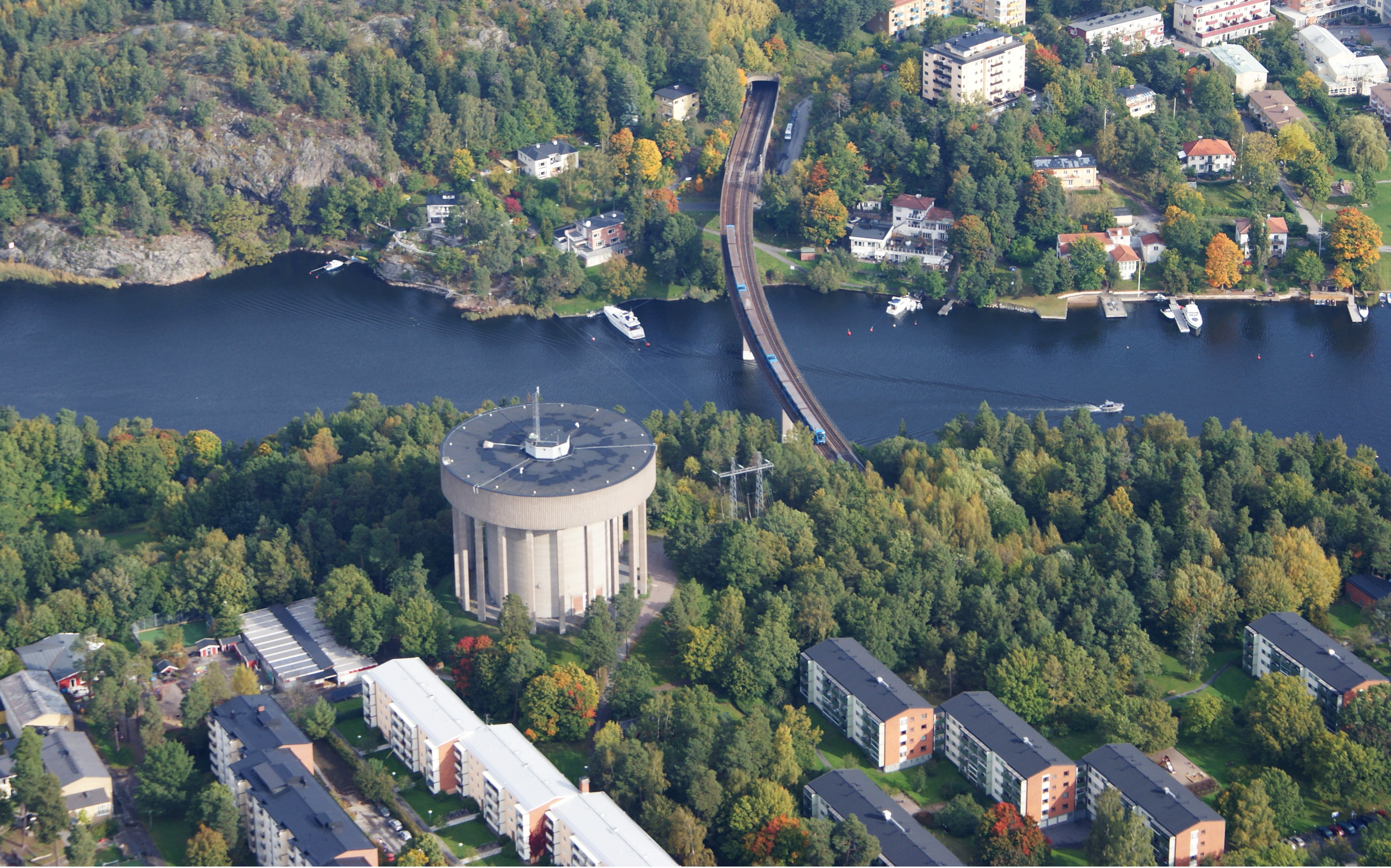
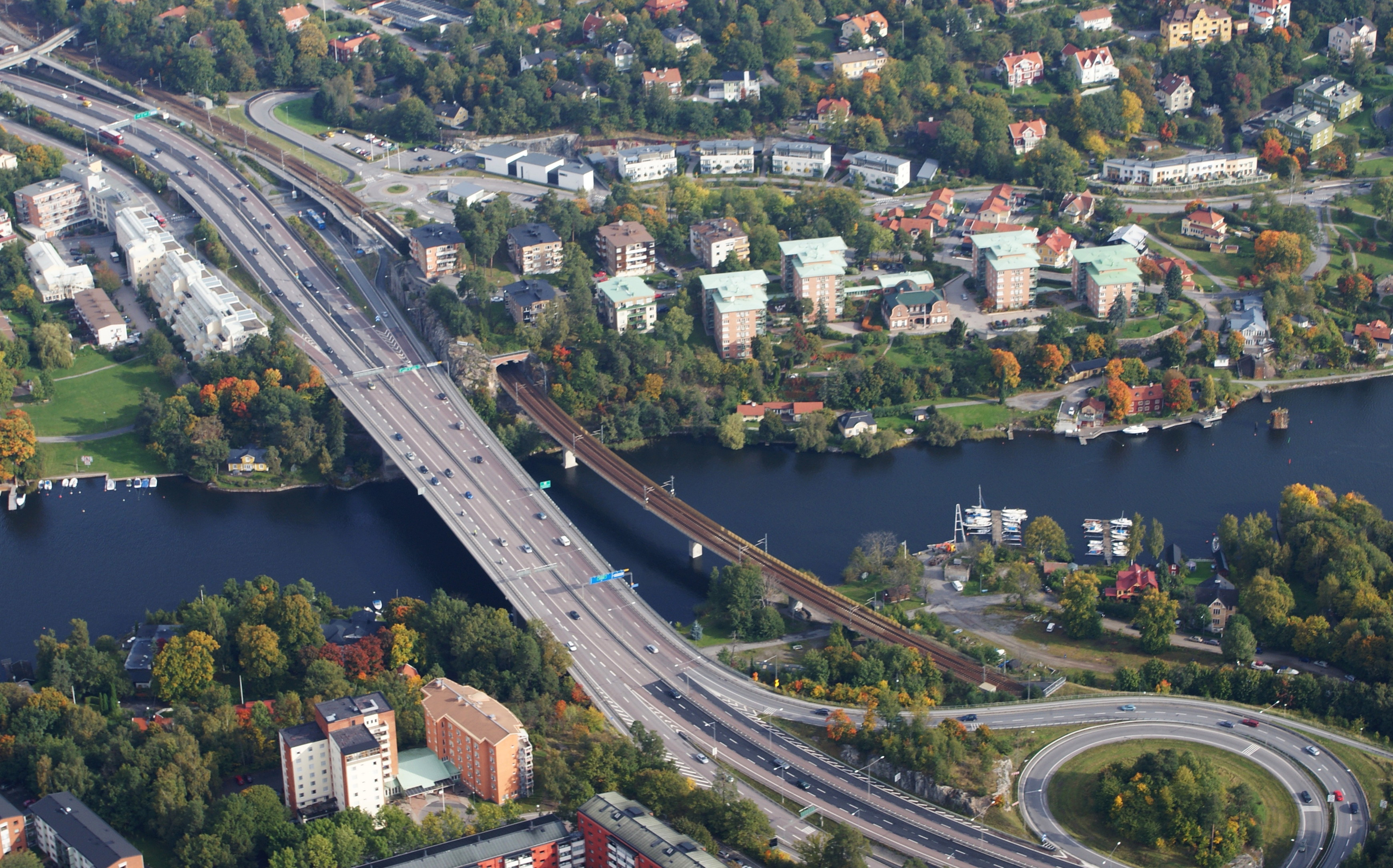
Stocksundet viewed from the south in 2012, showing (from left to right) the metro bridge, the road bridge and the new rail bridge. The remaining pier of the old rail bridge can just be seen at right.

== Bridges ==
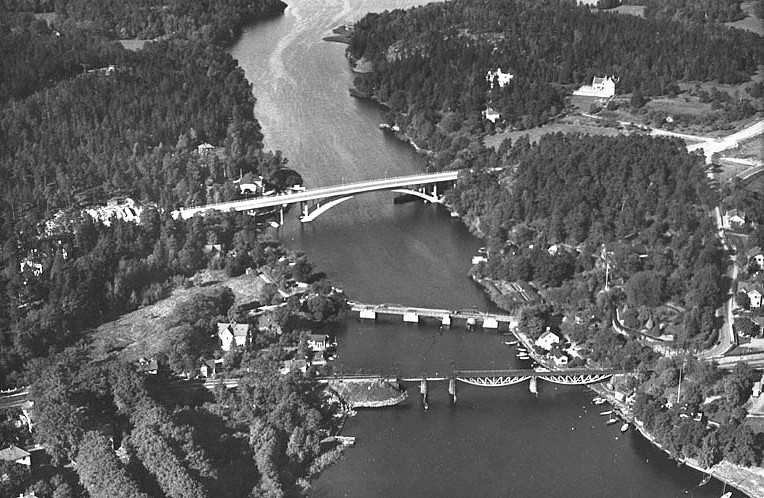
The 1936 road bridge, seen with its 1826 predecessor and the 1885 railway bridge, viewed from the east

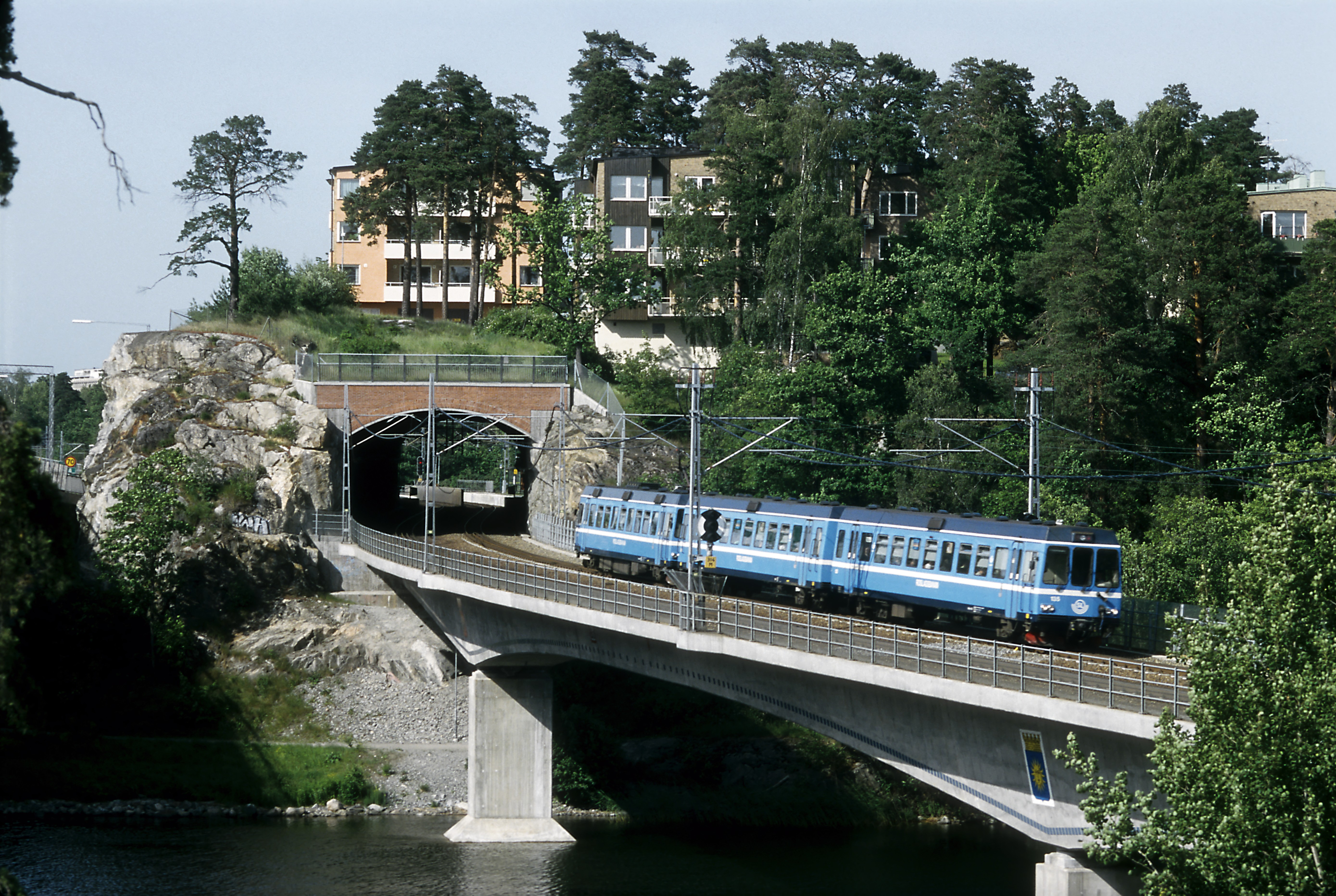
The new railway bridge for the Roslagsbanan over Stocksundet.

From west to east, the strait is spanned by a bridge for the Stockholm Metro, a road bridge for the European route E18, and a bridge for the Roslagsbanan narrow gauge commuter railway. Over time there have been seven bridges across the Stocksundet:

- The first bridge was built in 1716 the first bridge was built. It was a floating bridge with a drawbridge that could be opened to allow boat traffic to pass. Despite needing frequent repairs, the bridge lasted until September 1824, when it was destroyed in a violent storm.
- In 1825-1826 a new 90-metre (300 ft) long bridge was built in five sections between stone caissons and including a swing section. The bridge was superseded as a road bridge with the opening of a new bridge in 1936 but remained in use a pedestrian and bicycle bridge until the winter of 1957/8. The land ends of the bridge are still visible, along with the bridge house.
- In 1885 a railway bridge was constructed to carry the narrow gauge Roslagsbanan. The bridge carried a single track, and was 98-metre (322 ft) long, and comprised two fixed spans of 36.6 metres (120 ft) together with a 25-metre (82 ft) pivoting span. This bridge was replaced by a new bridge, on a different alignment, in 1996, and was demolished two years later. One of the bridge piers still exists within the state, and the land ends of the bridge are visible.
- Between 1934 and 1936, a modern concrete arch bridge was built a little further west than the 1826 road bridge. It had a span of 90 metres (300 ft) and was 16 metres (52 ft) wide, carrying two 1.5-metre (4 ft 11 in) walkways, two 2-metre (6 ft 7 in) bicycle lanes, and a 9-metre (30 ft) carriageway. This bridge had a relatively short life and was replaced in 1990, being demolished in order to make way for its replacement.
- In 1978 a bridge was built to carry the extension of the Stockholm Metro to Mörby centrum station. The bridge is 240 metres (790 ft) long, and consists of a four-span curved concrete structure, with a navigation clearance of 13 metres (43 ft). The bridge carries twin tracks, and the line runs in a tunnel at each end of the bridge.
- By the 1980s, the 1936 road bridge was no longer able to carry the increasingly intensive road traffic, and it was decided to replace it with two new parallel bridges for the Norrtälje road (E18) (one for north and one for south-traffic). The first of these bridges was completed in 1990, enabling the 1936 bridge to be demolished to make way for the second new bridge, which opened in 1992. The bridges have two large and one small span each, with the largest span of 122 metres (400 ft), with a navigation clearance of 12 metres (39 ft). The bridges are respectively 15.5 metres (51 ft) and 19.5 metres (64 ft) wide, carrying three northbound and four southbound lanes, together with pedestrian and cycle facilities.
- In 1996 a new railway bridge was built for the Roslagsbanan, located 100 metres (330 ft) west of the 1885 bridge, as part of the reconstruction of the line to double track. The new alignment necessitated the relocation of Stocksund station. The new bridge was designed by architect Laszlo Marko and is a concrete structure with four spans. It is 215 metres (705 ft) long and has a navigation clearance of 8 metres (26 ft), somewhat lower than the adjacent road and metro bridges.

== Bibliography ==
- Andrén, Gunnar; Balsvik, Gunnar; Bengtsson, Marianne; Bennet, Karl Henrik; Elfström, Arne (2011). Nya Stocksundsboken (in Swedish). Stockholm: Hjalmarson & Högberg Bokförlag AB. ISBN 978-91-7224-146-6.
- Stocksunds Köping; Folke Rengmark (1963). Bocken om Stocksund (in Swedish). Folke Rengmark.
