= Bergshamra, Solna =

Suburb in Stockholm, Sweden

Coordinates: 59°22′53″N 18°02′11″E

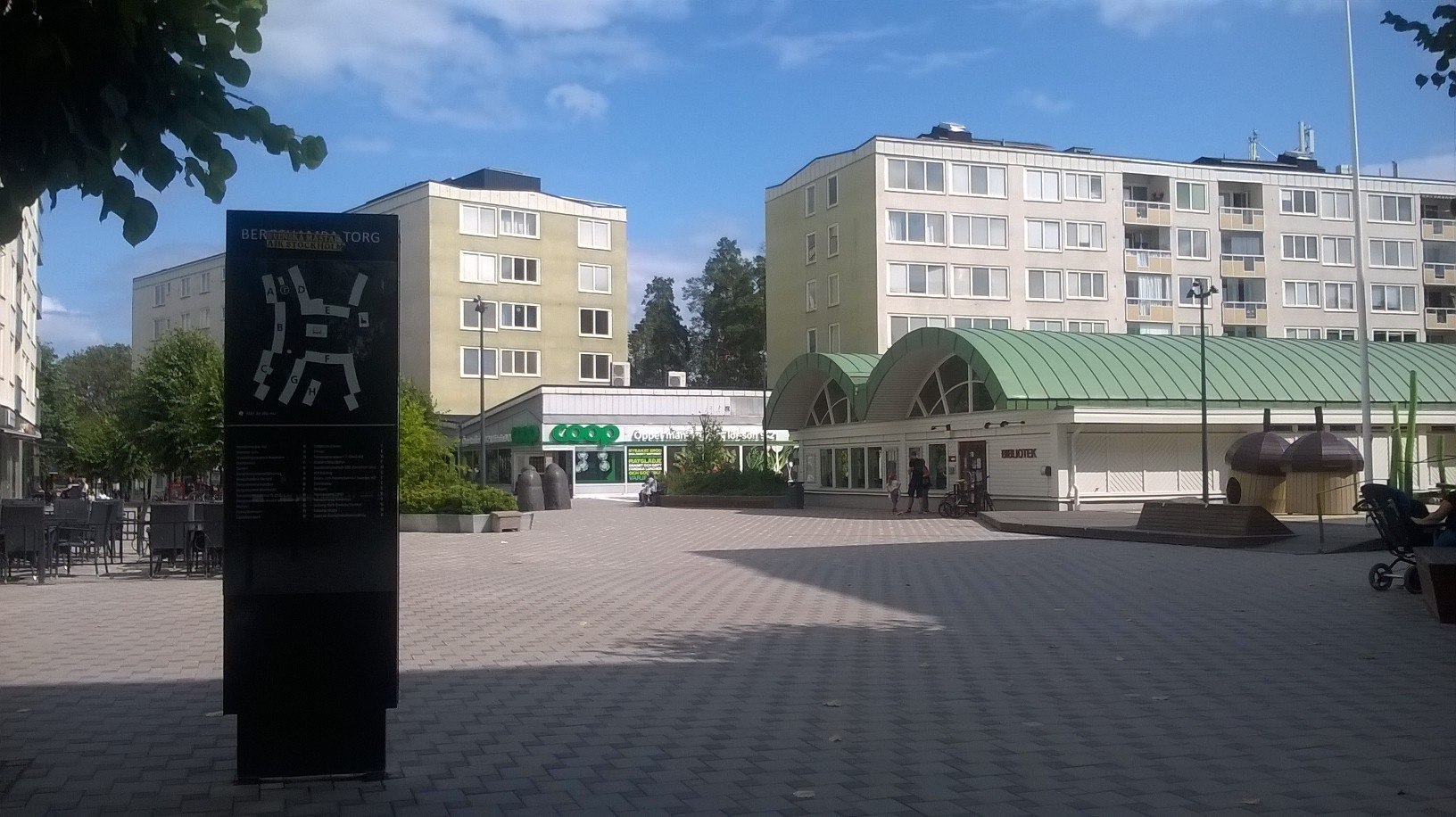
Bergshamra torg in July 2019

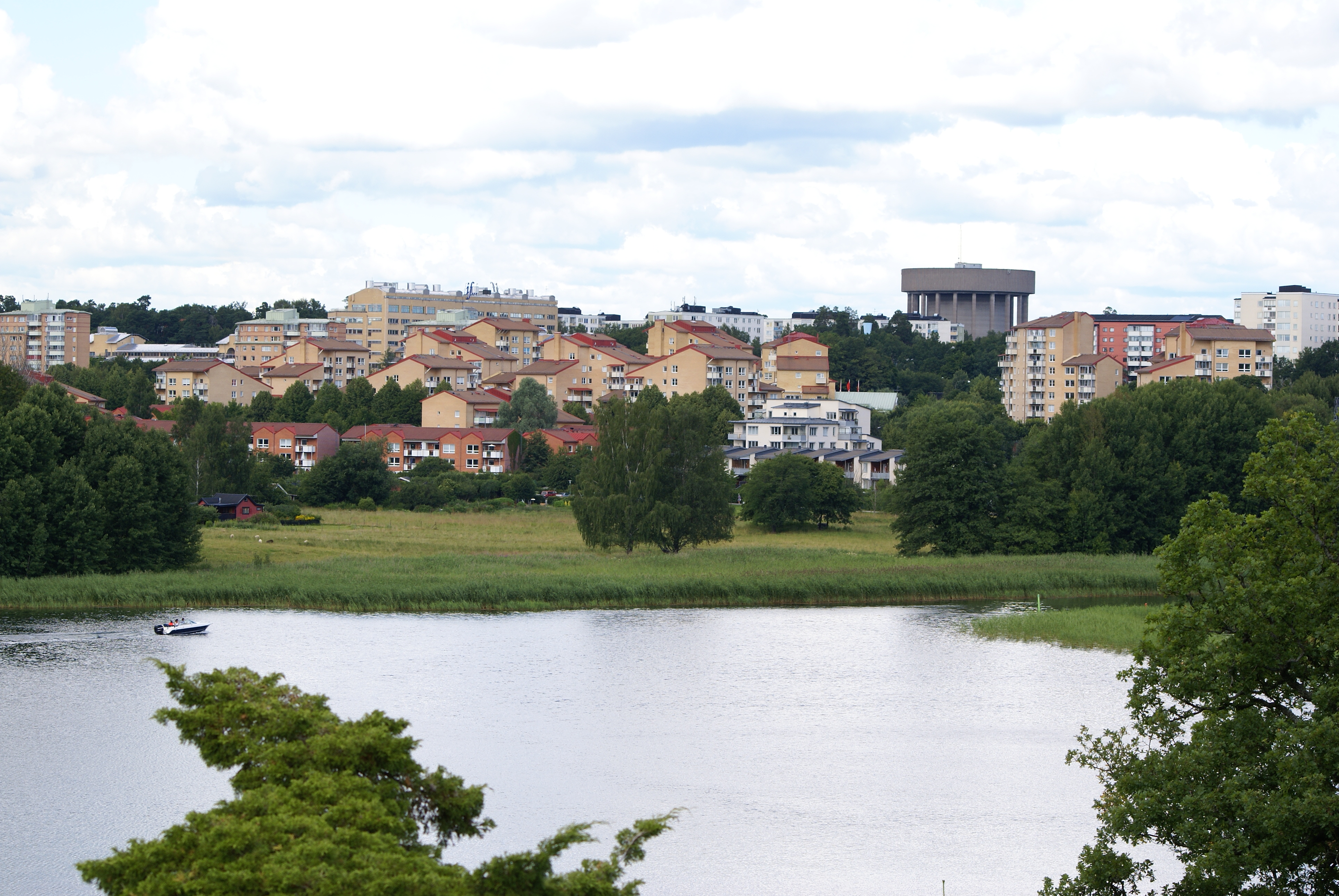
Bergshamra and Brunnsviken

Bergshamra (lit. 'Mountain Hamlet') is a suburb within the Stockholm urban area in Sweden. Administratively it is in Solna Municipality of Stockholm County. The suburb is surrounded on three sides by water, with the Stocksundet sea strait to the northeast, the Ålkistan channel to the southeast, and the Brunnsviken to the southwest.

Bergshamra station serves the suburb and is one of the 100 stations of the Stockholm Metro system.

== Notable residents ==
- Aron Flam (born 1978), comedian, podcaster, and writer, and actor
