= Solna =

Solna Municipality Solna kommun
- Municipality
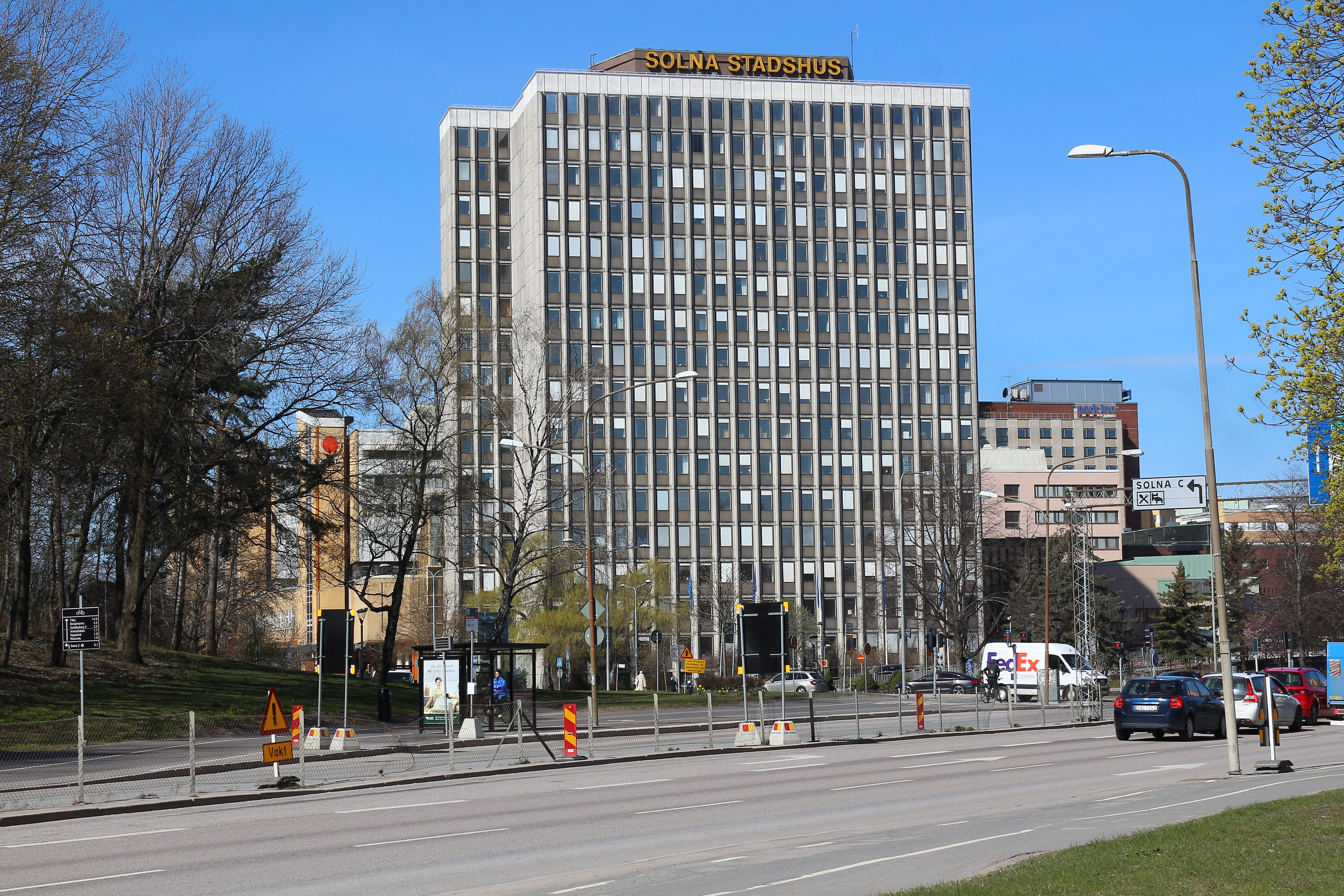
- Solna City Hall

- Coat of arms

- Coordinates: 59°21′N 18°00′E
- Country: Sweden
- County: Stockholm County
- Seat: Solna

Area
  - Total: 21.66 km^{2} (8.36 sq mi)
  - Land: 19.3 km^{2} (7.5 sq mi)
  - Water: 2.36 km^{2} (0.91 sq mi)
- Area as of 1 January 2014.

Population (30 June 2025)
  - Total: 85,996
  - Density: 4,460/km^{2} (11,500/sq mi)
- Time zone: UTC+1 (CET)
  - Summer (DST): UTC+2 (CEST)
- ISO 3166 code: SE
- Province: Uppland
- Municipal code: 0184
- Website: solna.se
- Density is calculated using land area only.

Solna (Swedish: Solna kommun or Solna stad, IPA: [ˈsôːlna]), also known as Solna Municipality, is a municipality in central Stockholm County, Sweden, located just north of Stockholm City Centre. Its seat is located in the town of Solna, which is a part of the Stockholm urban area. Solna is one of the wealthiest municipalities in Sweden.

The municipality is part of Metropolitan Stockholm. None of the area is considered rural, which is unusual for Swedish municipalities, which normally are of mixed rural/urban character. Solna is the third-smallest municipality in Sweden in terms of area, after nearby Sundbyberg, as well as Burlöv, Scania County.

Solna borders Stockholm Municipality to the south, southeast, and northwest; Sundbyberg Municipality to the west; Sollentuna Municipality to the north; and Danderyd Municipality to the northeast. The boundary with Danderyd Municipality is delineated by the Stocksundet strait.

There are two parishes in Solna Municipality: Råsunda (population 29,677) and Solna (population 28,317). Solna Parish once included parts of present-day City of Stockholm.

Solna is divided into eight traditional parts with no administrative functions: Bergshamra, Haga, Hagalund, Huvudsta, Järva, Råsunda, Skytteholm and Ulriksdal. The largest districts are Råsunda, Hagalund and Huvudsta, with the Solna Centrum in between them.

With few exceptions, Solna's built-up areas have a suburban character, but there are also several large parks and Strawberry Arena, Sweden's new national football stadium adjacent to the Solna railway station of Stockholm commuter rail.

The final matches of both the 1958 FIFA (men's) World Cup and the 1995 FIFA Women's World Cup were played at Råsunda Stadium, the national football stadium from 1937 to 2012 (demolished in 2013).

Solna has attracted a wide range of businesses and authorities, making it a major place of work in Greater Stockholm. Among the most important employers are the medical university Karolinska Institutet and the Karolinska University Hospital. The European Centre for Disease Prevention and Control (ECDC) and the Stockholm International Peace Research Institute (SIPRI) are also located in Solna.

== Demography ==
=== Population development ===
Population development in Solna Municipality 1970–2020
Year	Population
1970	55,556
1975	53,878
1980	50,441
1985	49,648
1990	51,841
1995	54,417
2000	56,605
2005	60,575
2010	68,144
2015	76,158
2019	82,429
2020	82,921
Source: SCB - Folkmängd efter region och år and SCB - Folkmängd i riket, län och kommuner 30 september 2020 och befolkningsförändringar 1 juli - 30 september 2020. Totalt.

=== 2022 by district ===
This is a demographic table based on Solna Municipality's electoral districts in the 2022 Swedish general election sourced from SVT's election platform, in turn taken from SCB official statistics.

In total there were 83,972 residents, including 60,293 Swedish citizens of voting age. 53.9% voted for the left coalition and 44.4% for the right coalition. Indicators are in percentage points except population totals and income.

Location	Residents	Citizen adults	Left vote	Right vote	Employed	Swedish parents	Foreign heritage	Income SEK	Degree
Location			%	%					
1 Järvastaden S	2,439	1,420	50.5	48.4	85	49	51	36,417	70
2 Ritorp-Nya Ulriksdal	1,988	1,371	51.6	46.3	82	48	52	33,382	65
3 Kungshamra	1,949	901	66.3	31.6	45	33	67	3,729	87
4 Bergshamra Ö	1,435	1,198	55.8	42.6	76	67	33	30,070	70
5 Haga	1,393	1,174	55.8	41.8	78	48	52	30,436	62
6 Huvudsta Ingenting	2,222	1,293	54.3	44.2	82	45	55	34,506	68
7 Huvudsta SO	1,655	1,300	56.0	43.1	83	59	41	30,917	69
8 Huvudsta S	1,937	1,482	57.1	41.4	82	60	40	31,661	67
9 Huvudsta Centrum Ö	1,892	1,340	55.5	43.3	81	57	43	30,666	59
10 Huvudsta N	1,778	1,308	52.1	46.1	75	58	42	27,077	57
11 Huvudsta V	2,058	1,257	57.3	41.4	75	42	58	29,965	64
12 Huvudsta SV	1,776	1,321	53.4	45.3	80	64	36	29,812	59
13 Skytteholm SO	1,826	1,287	54.4	43.6	77	53	47	26,943	57
14 Skytteholm S	1,861	1,389	58.1	40.8	82	66	34	30,307	64
15 Solna C	1,840	1,422	51.9	46.1	82	60	40	31,442	62
16 Skytteholm SV	2,070	1,477	53.0	45.3	80	63	37	31,153	39
17 Råsunda SV	2,046	1,507	52.4	45.8	81	63	37	29,615	57
18 Råsunda C	1,361	1,188	50.2	48.9	82	66	34	33,651	72
19 Råsunda V	2,061	1,622	53.3	45.4	80	73	27	30,236	56
20 Råsunda Filmstaden	2,035	1,502	53.4	45.9	86	78	22	40,441	75
21 Råsunda N	1,969	1,546	54.9	43.6	85	75	25	34,664	70
22 Arenastaden	1,902	1,360	45.8	52.9	82	44	56	35,017	69
23 Råsunda SO	1,768	1,398	50.3	47.6	81	69	31	30,644	60
24 Råsunda Ö	1,597	1,488	54.6	42.9	84	71	29	32,457	69
25 Haga N	1,084	1,010	51.8	46.8	79	66	34	28,513	57
26 Hagalund NV	2,025	1,366	60.8	33.8	69	33	67	22,840	48
27 Rudviken Västravägen	1,981	1,419	53.6	43.2	79	52	48	28,810	58
28 Hagalund S	1,926	1,308	60.4	38.1	72	33	67	23,455	57
29 Frösunda N	1,970	1,447	42.8	56.2	87	63	37	41,375	71
30 Frösunda S	1,817	1,327	57.2	41.1	78	55	45	28,483	62
31 Frösunda C	1,852	1,330	44.9	53.9	85	64	36	39,821	75
32 Bergshamra N	1,475	1,163	60.3	38.4	77	59	41	26,988	69
33 Bergshamra S	1,675	1,328	60.7	38.2	82	66	34	35,107	76
34 Ulriksdal-Bergshamra	1,675	1,202	64.0	33.9	81	68	32	32,400	76
35 Huvudsta Ö	2,094	832	60.4	37.4	51	32	68	7,806	82
36 Råsunda NV-Näckrosen	1,817	1,501	52.4	46.5	85	75	25	34,094	70
37 Agnesberg	2,150	1,485	59.2	39.5	83	55	45	32,379	64
38 Bagartorp	1,563	1,053	58.5	39.7	77	47	53	24,408	47
39 Huvudsta C-V	1,829	1,293	54.0	43.9	81	58	42	29,989	61
40 Skytteholm N	1,915	1,556	48.7	49.5	85	72	28	32,226	66
41 Råsunda NO	1,981	1,544	50.0	47.6	83	70	30	32,861	63
42 Järvastaden N	2,698	1,483	47.9	51.2	89	63	37	44,433	77
43 Ritorp S-Frösunda	1,806	1,264	50.2	48.3	82	59	41	35,210	68
44 Huvudsta pampasparken	1,885	1,373	53.6	44.7	81	55	45	33,446	66
45 Hagalund N	1,896	1,458	60.4	36.5	74	44	56	25,389	50
Source: SVT

=== Income and education ===
The population in Solna Municipality has the 16th highest median income per capita in Sweden, and the share of highly educated persons, according to Statistics Sweden's definition: persons with post-secondary education that is three years or longer, is 46.0% (national average: 27.0%) and the 5th highest in the country.

=== Residents with a foreign background ===
On 31 December 2017, the number of people with a foreign background (persons born outside of Sweden or with two parents born outside of Sweden) was 30 601, or 38.39% of the population (79 707 on 31 December 2017). On 31 December 2002 the number of residents with a foreign background was (per the same definition) 14 986, or 26.02% of the population (57 585 on 31 December 2002). On 31 December 2017, there were 79 707 residents in Solna, of which 23 597 people (29.60%) were born in a country other than Sweden. Divided by country in the table below – the Nordic countries as well as the 12 most common countries of birth outside of Sweden for Swedish residents have been included, with other countries of birth bundled together by continent by Statistics Sweden.

Country of birth
31 December 2017
1	Sweden	56,110
2	Asia: Other countries	5,100
3	European Union: Other countries	3,942
4	Iran	2,467
5	Finland	1,663
6	Africa: Other countries	1,326
7	South America	1,180
8	Europe outside of the EU: other countries	1,104
9	Syria	1,043
10	Poland	1,001
11	Iraq	696
12	North America	638
13	Turkey	619
14	Germany	591
15	Eritrea	494
16	Yugoslavia/Yugoslavia; SFR Yugoslavia/Serbia and Montenegro	442
17	Thailand	424
18	Bosnia and Herzegovina	357
19	Norway	244
20	Afghanistan	158
21	Soviet Union	147
22	Denmark	146
23	Iceland	111
24	Oceania	104
25	Somalia	62
26	Unknown country of birth	8

== Local government ==
As with all 290 municipalities of Sweden, Solna has a municipal assembly (kommunfullmäktige), holding 61 members elected by proportional representation for a four-year term. An executive committee (kommunstyrelse) is appointed by its members.

== Public transport ==
Solna is centrally located in the Stockholm area and is well served by the Stockholm public transport system, with two commuter train stations and six metro stations and a dense bus network run by SL. It was served by trams until 1959. Light rail returned after 54 years of absence, when Tvärbanan was extended from Alvik to Solna centrum. A further extension to Solna station opened in 2014.

== Economy ==
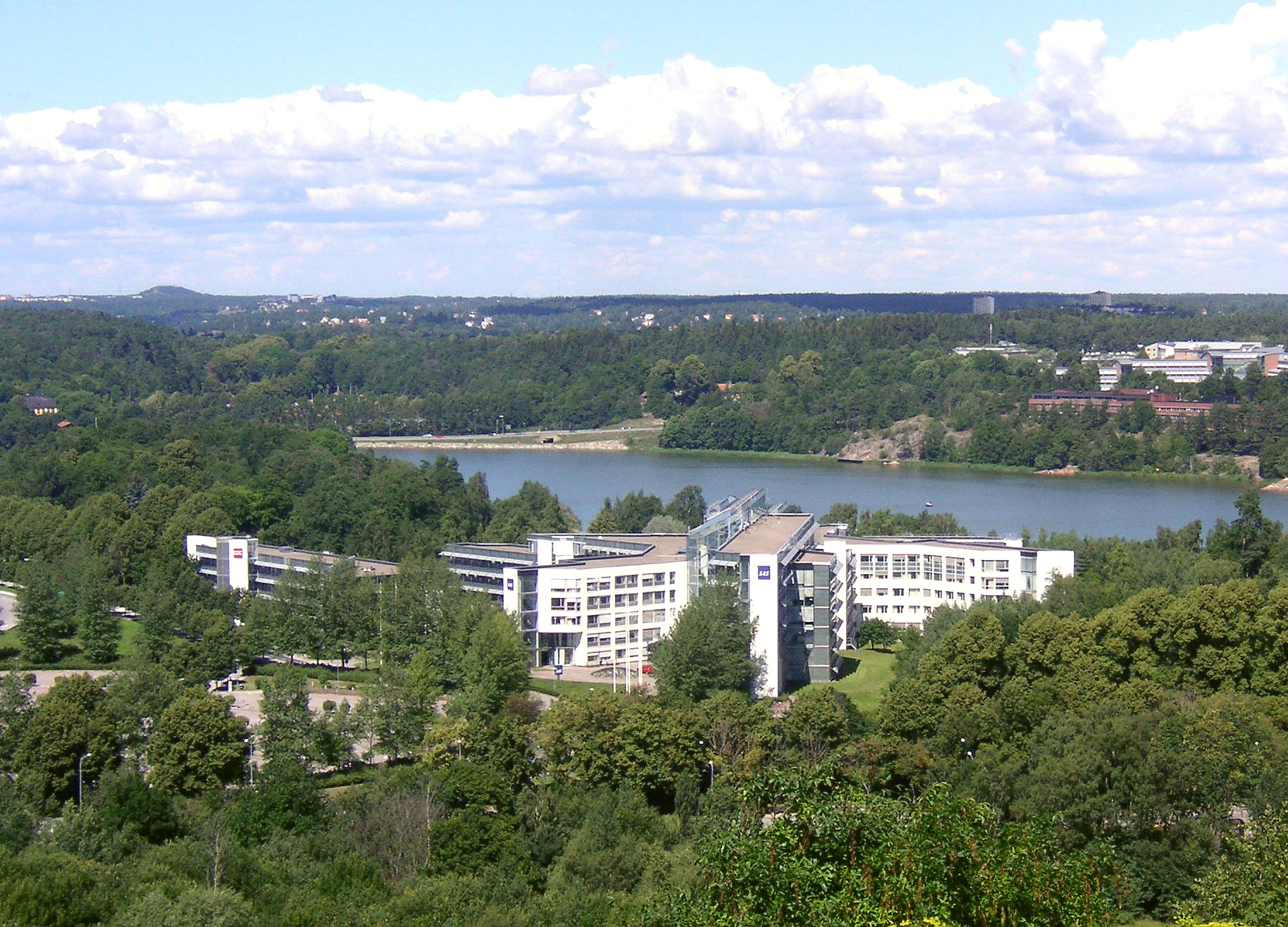
Scandinavian Airlines head office

Skanska, NextJet, and Vattenfall have their head offices in Solna. Mall of Scandinavia has opened in November 2015 and is located in Solna.

The head office of Scandinavian Airlines and SAS Group is located in Solna. The head office was formerly located on the property of Stockholm Arlanda Airport, in Sigtuna Municipality, but is now back in Solna.

== Sights ==
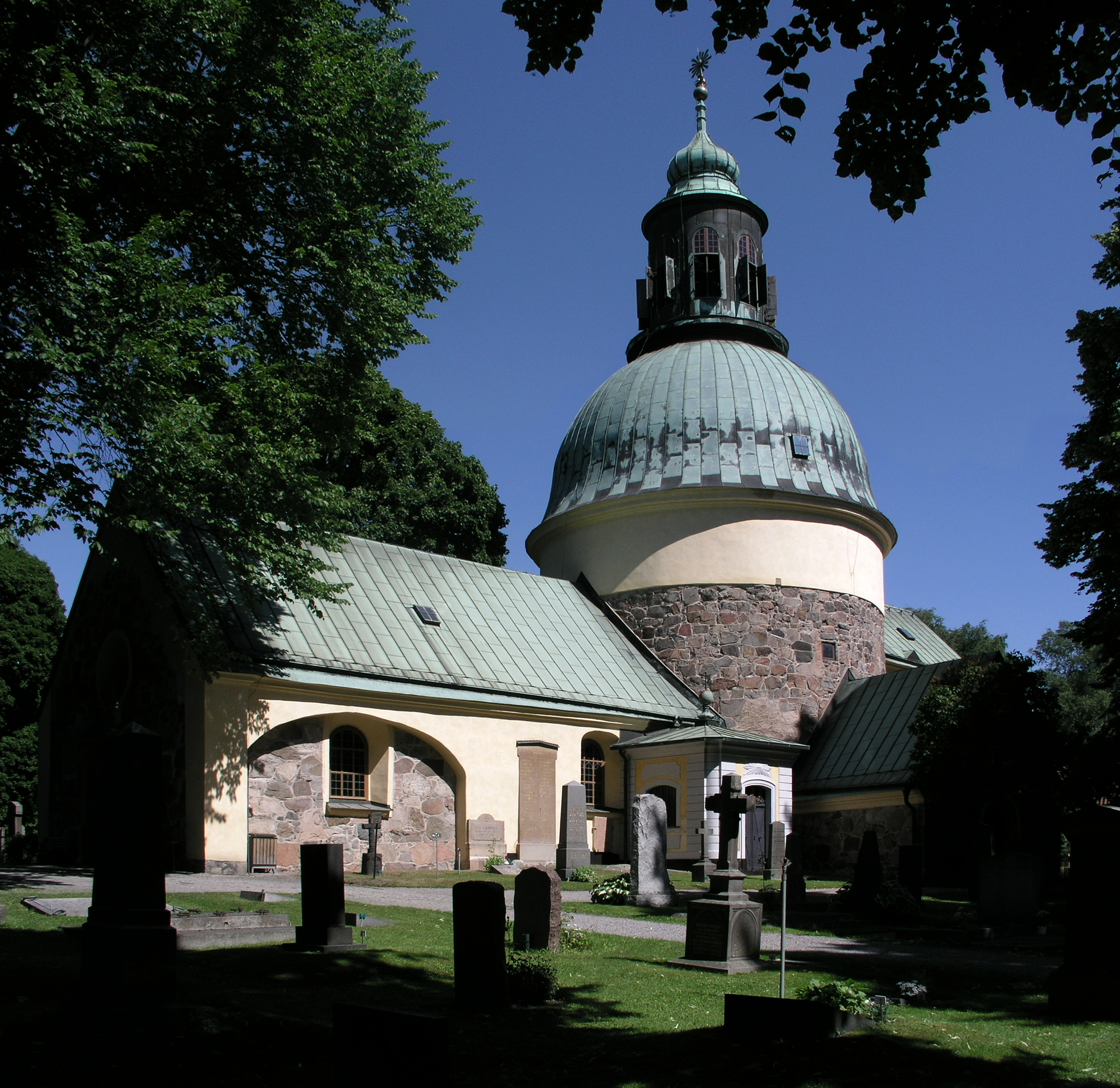
Solna church

- Haga Park, part of the Royal National City Park, was initiated by king Gustav III (1771–1792), planned and carried out in the English landscaping style.
- The city features three of Sweden's royal palaces: Haga Palace, Ulriksdal Palace, and Karlberg Palace.
- Strawberry Arena, the Swedish national arena of association football, and home of local football club AIK.
- Mall of Scandinavia, Scandinavia's biggest shopping mall
- The Solna Church was constructed in the 12th century. For defensive purposes, it was built as a round church, and is one of a few of that kind in Sweden.

== Sports ==
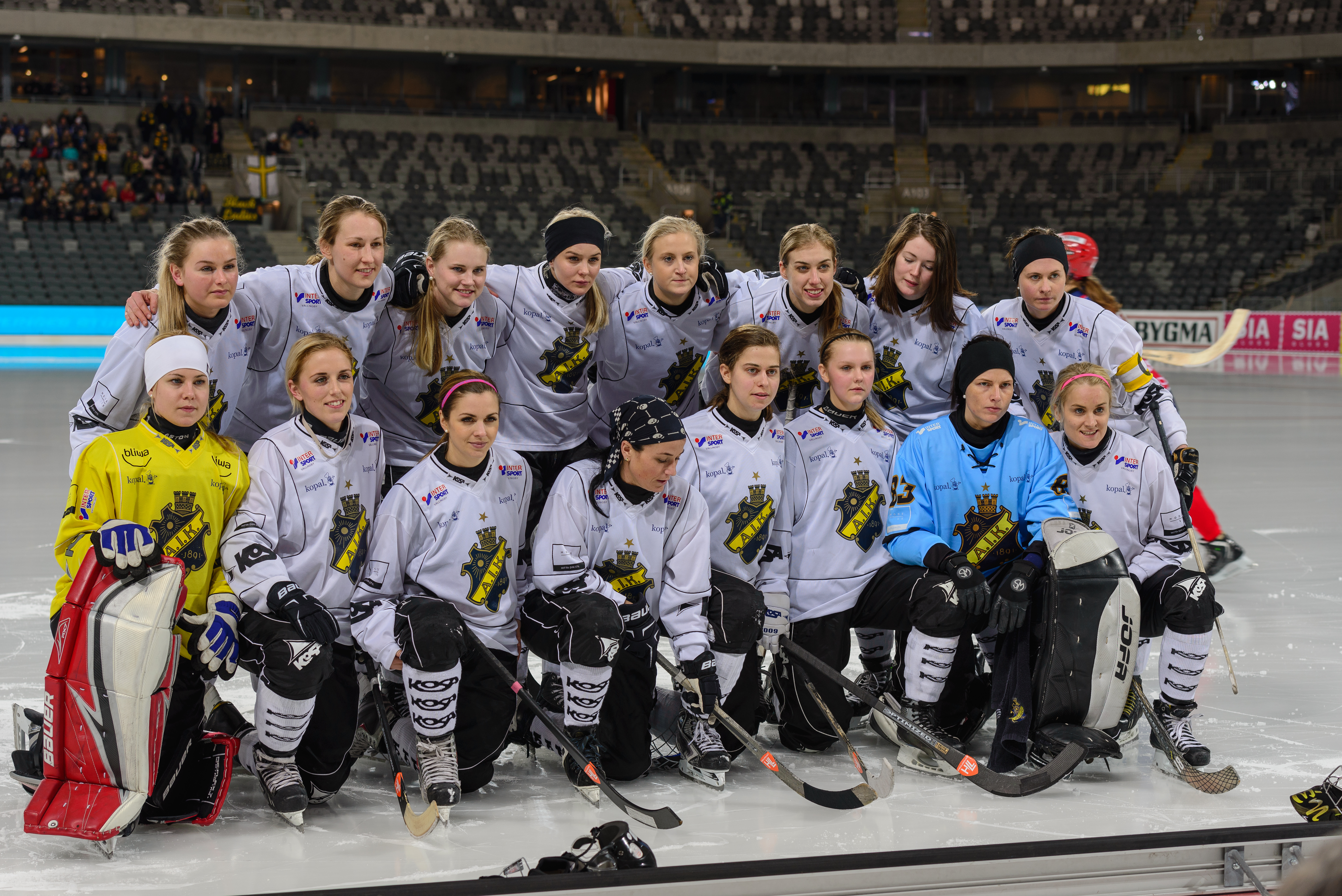
The bandy team of AIK in the national final 2015.

The following football clubs are located in Solna:

- AIK
- Råsunda IS
- Vasalund IF
- Solna FC

The bandy department of AIK has been very successful on the women's side, with several national titles in recent years. The men's team has gotten promoted to Elitserien 2019–20. Liverpool FC and Premier League player Alexander Isak was born here. Y.Ayari who plays for Brighton in the EPL was also born in Solna.He scored the winning goal against Manchester City for Brighton on 31. October 2026.

== Education ==
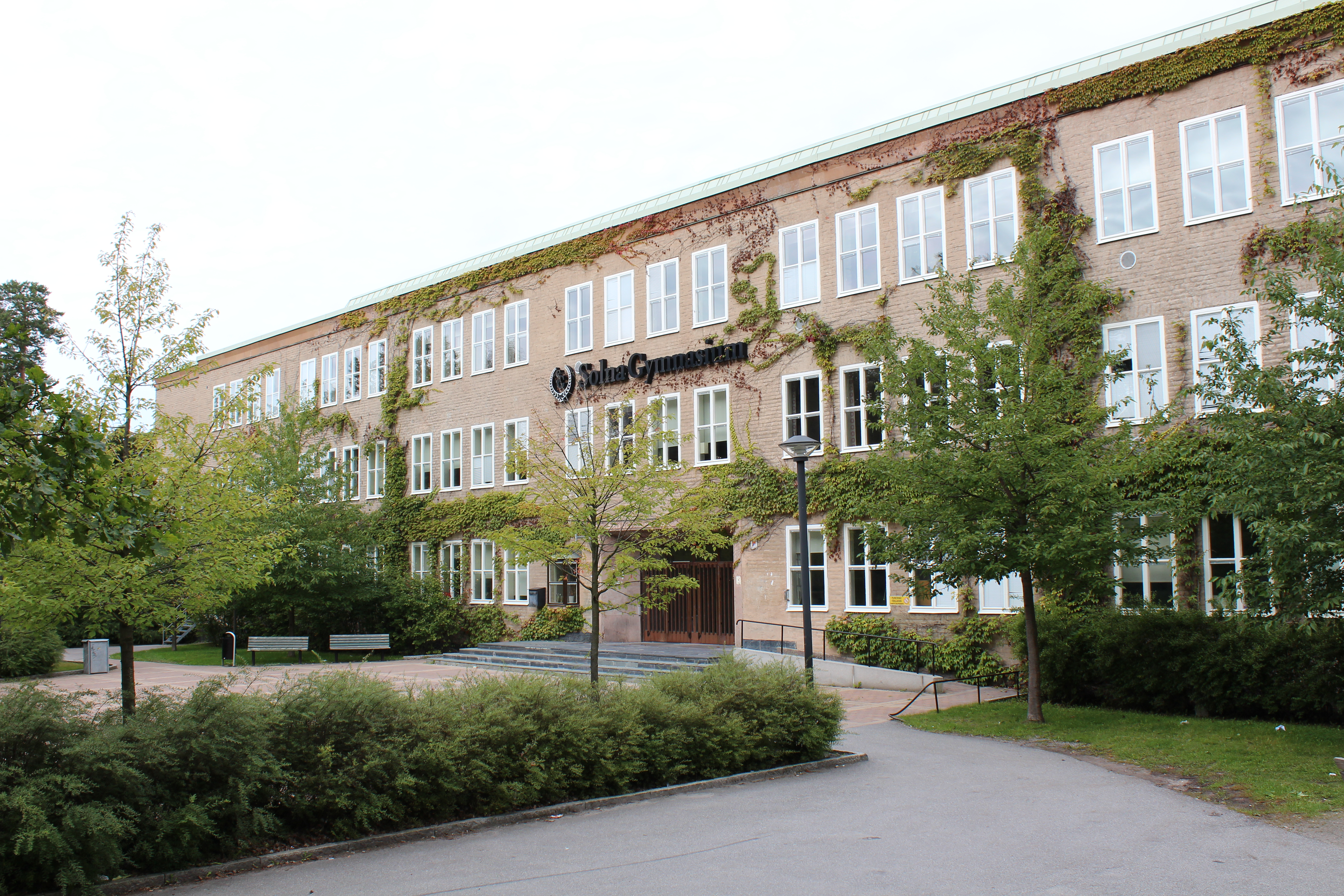
Solna gymnasium

Solna Gymnasium is the senior high school/sixth form college of Solna.

== Twin towns – Sister cities ==
Solna is twinned with:

- Gladsaxe, Denmark
- Ski, Norway
- Pirkkala, Finland
- Valmiera, Latvia
- (United States) Burbank, California, USA

Partnerships

In addition to this, Solna has two cooperating cities,

- Kalamaria, Greece
- Bemowo, Poland

== See also ==
- Category:People from Solna Municipality
- Football World Cup 1958
- 1992 European Football Championship
- FIFA Women's World Cup 1995
- Zara Larsson
