= Danderyd Municipality =

Danderyd Municipality Danderyds kommun
- Municipality
- Coat of arms

- Coordinates: 59°24′N 18°05′E
- Country: Sweden
- County: Stockholm County
- Seat: Djursholm

Area
  - Total: 32.67 km^{2} (12.61 sq mi)
  - Land: 26.4 km^{2} (10.2 sq mi)
  - Water: 6.27 km^{2} (2.42 sq mi) 18.6%
- Area as of 1 January 2014.

Population (30 June 2025)
  - Total: 32,551
  - Density: 1,230/km^{2} (3,190/sq mi)
- Time zone: UTC+1 (CET)
  - Summer (DST): UTC+2 (CEST)
- ISO 3166 code: SE
- Province: Uppland
- Municipal code: 0162
- Website: www.danderyd.se
- Density is calculated using land area only.

Danderyd Municipality (Swedish: Danderyds kommun [ˈdânːdɛˌryːd]) is a municipality north of Stockholm in Stockholm County in east central Sweden. It is one of the smallest municipalities of Sweden, but the most affluent. Its seat is located in Djursholm and it is located within Stockholm urban area.

The "old" rural municipality Danderyd was split up during the early 20th century, when Djursholm and Stocksund broke away in 1901 and 1910 respectively. Since 1971 Danderyd Municipality is reunified in approximately the old boundaries. The population in 2019 was 32,857. The four districts making up Danderyd are: Danderyd, Djursholm, Stocksund and Enebyberg.

== Demographics ==
=== Income and education ===
The population in Danderyd Municipality is among the most affluent in the country, having the highest median income per capita. One of the reasons for this is the high price on real estate, which in turn is partially due to a restrictive policy on new developments by the municipality council.

The high income of the population has enabled the municipality to maintain a relatively low rate of taxation, but a government redistribution scheme intended to transfer money from socioeconomically advantaged municipalities to those less well-off along with financial mismanagement has caused tax rises and expenditure reductions in recent years.

Danderyd Municipality also has the highest share (57.0%) of highly educated persons (Statistics Sweden definition: persons with post-secondary education that is three years or longer) in the country.

Population development in Danderyd Municipality 1970–2019
Year	Population
1970	27,623
1975	27,168
1980	27,842
1985	28,706
1990	27,915
1995	28,684
2000	29,570
2005	30,226
2010	31,330
2015	32,421
2017	32,888
2019	32,857
Source: SCB - Folkmängd efter region och tid.

=== 2022 population by district ===
This is a demographic table based on Danderyd Municipality's electoral districts in the 2022 Swedish general election sourced from SVT's election platform, in turn taken from SCB official statistics.

In total there were 32,772 residents, including 24,246 Swedish citizens of voting age resident in the municipality. 28.8% voted for the left coalition and 70.3% for the right coalition. Indicators are in percentage points except population totals and income.

Location	Residents	Citizen adults	Left vote	Right vote	Employed	Swedish parents	Foreign heritage	Income SEK	Degree
Location			%	%					
Anneberg	1,875	1,273	34.1	65.4	82	82	18	43,852	77
Berga-Rinkeby	2,106	1,456	33.7	64.4	80	68	32	35,021	67
Djursholms Ekeby	1,595	1,101	27.8	71.3	77	77	23	37,179	74
Djursholms Ösby	1,545	1,160	18.5	80.7	75	82	18	43,459	79
Gamla Enebyberg	1,808	1,236	30.8	68.4	87	86	14	50,078	81
Inverness	1,464	1,150	45.2	53.1	76	64	36	27,131	62
Kevinge Strand	1,593	1,350	34.1	64.8	82	82	18	33,983	71
Kevinge-Mörbyskogen	1,609	1,316	40.0	58.9	82	70	30	32,323	74
Klingsta	1,881	1,335	31.1	68.1	80	81	19	41,915	81
Långängen-Tranholmen	1,833	1,233	26.4	73.2	79	80	20	45,252	78
Mellersta Djursholm	1,363	1,058	15.9	83.6	64	82	18	39,100	76
Mörby	1,035	1,159	36.0	62.6	77	74	26	30,419	73
Nora	1,802	1,272	26.5	72.8	84	85	15	51,647	81
Norra Djursholm	1,631	1,173	18.0	81.4	68	74	26	34,730	67
Sikreno	1,704	1,228	26.9	72.3	77	82	18	41,304	78
Stocksund	1,709	1,177	26.1	73.1	75	81	19	41,888	77
Svalnäs	1,475	1,108	16.3	83.6	68	83	17	35,913	76
Sätra Äng	1,578	1,135	29.7	68.8	84	81	19	40,467	73
Södra Djursholm	1,381	1,034	13.3	86.3	72	84	16	46,988	77
Västra Enebyberg	1,785	1,292	34.2	65.0	85	85	15	39,613	80
Source: SVT

=== Residents with a foreign background ===
On 31 December 2017 the number of people with a foreign background (persons born outside of Sweden or with two parents born outside of Sweden) was 6,402, or 19.47% of the population (32,888 on 31 December 2017). On 31 December 2002 the number of residents with a foreign background was (per the same definition) 4,512, or 15.16% (29,755 on 31 December 2002). On 31 December 2017 there were 32,888 residents in Danderyd, of which 5,394 people (16.40%) were born in a country other than Sweden, divided by country in the table below. Nordic countries as well as the 12 most common countries of birth outside of Sweden for Swedish residents have been included, with other countries of birth grouped together by continent by Statistics Sweden.

Country of birth
31 December 2017
1	Sweden	27,494
2	European Union: Other countries	1,303
3	Asia: Other countries	724
4	North America	459
5	Finland	408
6	Iran	326
7	Germany	294
8	South America	250
9	Europe outside of the EU: other countries	239
10	Poland	237
11	Africa: Other countries	196
12	Syria	186
13	Norway	175
14	Iraq	120
15	Denmark	77
16	Eritrea	70
17	Thailand	57
18	Soviet Union	56
19	Oceania	44
20	Turkey	41
21	Yugoslavia/Yugoslavia; SFR Yugoslavia/Serbia and Montenegro	40
22	Afghanistan	32
23	Bosnia and Herzegovina	28
24	Somalia	16
25	Iceland	14
26	Unknown country of birth	2

== Roads ==
The European route E18 stretches through the municipality, from the road bridge over the Stocksundet sea strait, north towards Norrtälje Municipality.

== Public transport ==
Danderyd is served by the Stockholm public transport system through SL. There are two stations on the Red Line of the Stockholm Metro: Danderyd Hospital (which is the location for a public hospital) and Mörby centrum. There are also several stops on the narrow gauge Roslagsbanan suburban railway as well as an extensive bus network including a large bus interchange at Danderyds sjukhus.

== Notable people ==
- Ted Brithen (born 1990), ice hockey player
- Mattias Janmark (born 1992), ice hockey player
- Linda Ulvaeus (born 1973), singer
- Azaan Sami Khan (born 1993), actor, singer, composer
- Hanna Stjärne (born 1969), CEO, Sveriges Television
- Christian Lindberg (born 1958), musician and conductor
- Princess Sofia, Duchess of Värmland (born 1984), former model and reality television contestant, wife of Prince Carl Philip, Duke of Värmland
- Helge von Koch (born 1870), mathematician and pioneer in fractals
- Irina Björklund (born 1973), Finnish actress, born in Danderyd
- Tove Lo (born 1987), pop musician
- Benjamin Ingrosso (born 1997), singer
- Stig Wennerström (1906-2006), Air Force colonel and Soviet spy
