= Malmöhus County (Riksdag constituency) =

Swedish electoral district

- Malmöhus Län
- Former constituency for the Riksdag
- County: Malmöhus
- Electorate: 231,023 (1991)

Former constituency
- Created: 1970
- Abolished: 1994
- Seats: List (Note: Constituency seats only.): 11 (1979–1994)); 10 (1970–1979)
- Created from: Malmöhus County
- Replaced by: List: Malmöhus County North; Malmöhus County South

Malmöhus County (Swedish: Malmöhus Län) was a multi-member constituency of the Riksdag, the national legislature of Sweden. The constituency was established in 1970 when the Riksdag changed from a bicameral legislature to a unicameral legislature. It was conterminous with the county of Malmöhus but excluded the municipalities of Helsingborg, Landskrona, Lund and Malmö which had their own constituency. It was abolished in 1994 following the reorganisation of the constituencies in Malmöhus County and replaced by Malmöhus County North and Malmöhus County South.

== Electoral system ==
Malmöhus County elected members of the Riksdag using the open party-list proportional representation electoral system. Constituency seats were allocated using the modified Sainte-Laguë method. Only parties that reached the 4% national threshold and parties that received at least 12% of the vote in the constituency competed for constituency seats. Supplementary levelling seats may also have been allocated at the constituency level to parties that reached the 4% national threshold.

Voters could cast any ballot paper they wanted though it had to contain the name of a party and the name of at least one candidate nominated by that party in the constituency. It was common for parties to hand out ballot papers with their name and list of candidates at the entrance of polling stations. Voters could delete the names of candidates or write-in the names of other candidates but in practice these options weren't used enough by voters to have any significant impact on the results and consequently elections operated as a closed system.

Seats won by each party/list in a constituency were allocated to its candidates in order of preference votes (a personal mandate), provided that the candidate had received at least 8% of votes cast for their party in the constituency. Any unfilled seats were then allocated to the party's remaining candidates in the order they appeared on the party list (a party mandate).

== Election results ==
=== Summary ===
Election	Left V / VPK			Social Democrats S			Greens MP			Centre C			Liberals FP / F			Moderates M			Christian Democrats KDS		
Election	Votes	%	Seats	Votes	%	Seats	Votes	%	Seats	Votes	%	Seats	Votes	%	Seats	Votes	%	Seats	Votes	%	Seats
1991	3,512	1.76%	0	70,790	35.40%	4	4,828	2.41%	0	15,904	7.95%	1	14,686	7.34%	1	56,044	28.02%	4	11,053	5.53%	0
1988	4,255	2.21%	0	82,477	42.83%	5	9,972	5.18%	0	23,999	12.46%	2	20,010	10.39%	1	47,193	24.51%	3	2,832	1.47%	0
1985	3,290	1.68%	0	82,966	42.38%	5	2,694	1.38%	0	26,454	13.51%	2	26,137	13.35%	1	53,804	27.48%	3	with C		
1982	3,453	1.78%	0	84,865	43.75%	5	2,640	1.36%	0	33,641	17.34%	2	11,385	5.87%	1	56,227	28.98%	3	1,448	0.75%	0
1979	3,281	1.74%	0	78,796	41.74%	5				36,471	19.32%	2	21,121	11.19%	1	47,270	25.04%	3	1,017	0.54%	0
1976	2,664	1.44%	0	77,771	42.09%	4				50,048	27.09%	3	20,108	10.88%	1	32,832	17.77%	2	1,205	0.65%	0
1973	2,302	1.37%	0	74,059	44.23%	5				52,379	31.29%	3	12,493	7.46%	1	24,409	14.58%	1	1,442	0.86%	0
1970	1,253	0.77%	0	75,912	46.43%	5				44,395	27.15%	3	20,823	12.74%	1	19,586	11.98%	1	1,376	0.84%	0

(Excludes levelling seats. Figures in italics represent alliances/joint lists.)

=== Detailed ===
Party has received at least 4% of the vote nationally and is entitled to compete for constituency seats.

==== 1990s ====
===== 1991 =====
Results of the 1991 general election held on 15 September 1991:

Party		Votes per municipality																Total votes	%	Seats		
Party		Bjuv	Burlöv	Eslöv	Höga- näs	Höör	Hörby	Käv- linge	Lomma	Sjöbo	Skurup	Staffans- torp	Svalöv	Svedala	Trelle- borg	Vel- linge	Ystad	Total votes	%	Con.	Lev.	Tot.
Swedish Social Democratic Party	S	4,002	4,050	7,171	4,656	2,175	2,102	5,881	3,286	2,872	2,737	3,657	2,955	4,300	10,758	3,926	6,262	70,790	35.40%	4	1	5
Moderate Party	M	1,676	2,207	4,035	4,741	2,103	1,815	3,866	4,416	2,034	1,951	3,757	1,678	2,867	5,230	9,317	4,351	56,044	28.02%	4	0	4
Centre Party	C	535	298	2,150	878	990	1,552	991	481	713	1,089	724	1,219	712	1,456	732	1,384	15,904	7.95%	1	0	1
Liberal People's Party	FP	521	701	982	1,300	592	571	1,181	1,270	425	550	1,129	480	776	1,457	1,645	1,106	14,686	7.34%	1	0	1
New Democracy	NyD	561	627	1,223	985	833	900	1,108	715	644	595	680	599	712	1,240	1,423	1,080	13,925	6.96%	1	0	1
Christian Democratic Unity	KDS	367	355	871	1,276	637	835	612	662	457	421	544	481	626	1,223	958	728	11,053	5.53%	0	1	1
Green Party	MP	115	225	376	465	300	216	351	335	259	173	278	186	269	560	350	370	4,828	2.41%	0	0	0
Left Party	V	250	249	322	322	135	128	288	127	137	147	162	134	189	513	131	278	3,512	1.76%	0	0	0
Other parties		339	268	532	327	234	526	359	271	2,718	732	305	137	315	830	310	1,047	9,250	4.63%	0	0	0
Valid votes		8,366	8,980	17,662	14,950	7,999	8,645	14,637	11,563	10,259	8,395	11,236	7,869	10,766	23,267	18,792	16,606	199,992	100.00%	11	2	13
Rejected votes		185	152	306	180	99	111	310	208	135	152	195	158	236	399	228	336	3,390	1.67%			
Total polled		8,551	9,132	17,968	15,130	8,098	8,756	14,947	11,771	10,394	8,547	11,431	8,027	11,002	23,666	19,020	16,942	203,382	88.04%			
Registered electors		9,889	10,322	20,976	17,126	9,458	10,302	16,683	12,706	12,215	9,955	12,630	9,281	12,227	27,129	20,467	19,657	231,023				
Turnout		86.47%	88.47%	85.66%	88.35%	85.62%	84.99%	89.59%	92.64%	85.09%	85.86%	90.51%	86.49%	89.98%	87.24%	92.93%	86.19%	88.04%				

The following candidates were elected: Bo Arvidson (M); Inga Berggren (M); Bertil Fiskesjö (C); Per Olof Håkansson (S); Anita Jönsson (S); Gunnar Nilsson (S); Siw Persson (FP); Bengt Silfverstrand (S); Per Stenmarck (M); Knut Wachtmeister (M); Karin Wegestål (S); Alwa Wennerlund (KDS); and Claus Zaar (NyD).

==== 1980s ====
===== 1988 =====
Results of the 1988 general election held on 18 September 1988:

Party		Votes per municipality																Total votes	%	Seats		
Party		Bjuv	Burlöv	Eslöv	Höga- näs	Höör	Hörby	Käv- linge	Lomma	Sjöbo	Skurup	Staffans- torp	Svalöv	Svedala	Trelle- borg	Vel- linge	Ystad	Total votes	%	Con.	Lev.	Tot.
Swedish Social Democratic Party	S	4,883	4,803	8,209	5,315	2,479	2,536	6,498	3,796	3,687	3,285	4,232	3,407	4,991	12,055	4,690	7,611	82,477	42.83%	5	1	6
Moderate Party	M	1,224	1,953	3,197	4,280	1,782	1,547	2,791	3,818	2,147	1,627	3,233	1,473	2,266	4,211	7,886	3,758	47,193	24.51%	3	0	3
Centre Party	C	719	405	2,815	1,246	1,368	2,183	1,376	736	2,618	1,624	1,084	1,538	1,006	2,102	1,137	2,042	23,999	12.46%	2	0	2
Liberal People's Party	FP	748	904	1,404	1,834	829	982	1,467	1,714	722	713	1,424	622	1,056	1,747	2,248	1,596	20,010	10.39%	1	0	1
Green Party	MP	327	458	735	992	530	369	699	656	557	387	607	386	501	1,123	878	767	9,972	5.18%	0	1	1
Left Party – Communists	VPK	328	361	375	379	131	130	389	211	173	145	197	163	188	557	175	353	4,255	2.21%	0	0	0
Christian Democratic Unity	KDS	107	79	321	356	187	343	92	124	83	89	116	137	155	268	230	145	2,832	1.47%	0	0	0
Other parties		36	148	100	64	50	62	129	113	83	83	127	123	258	208	160	64	1,808	0.94%	0	0	0
Valid votes		8,372	9,111	17,156	14,466	7,356	8,152	13,441	11,168	10,070	7,953	11,020	7,849	10,421	22,271	17,404	16,336	192,546	100.00%	11	2	13
Rejected votes		91	124	229	177	94	116	184	161	204	154	167	131	150	293	173	219	2,667	1.37%			
Total polled		8,463	9,235	17,385	14,643	7,450	8,268	13,625	11,329	10,274	8,107	11,187	7,980	10,571	22,564	17,577	16,555	195,213	87.73%			
Registered electors		9,783	10,436	20,414	16,722	8,822	9,869	15,330	12,350	11,663	9,467	12,304	9,205	11,743	26,105	19,111	19,203	222,527				
Turnout		86.51%	88.49%	85.16%	87.57%	84.45%	83.78%	88.88%	91.73%	88.09%	85.63%	90.92%	86.69%	90.02%	86.44%	91.97%	86.21%	87.73%				

The following candidates were elected: Bertil Fiskesjö (C); Per Olof Håkansson (S); Håkan Hansson (C); Anita Jönsson (S); Gösta Lyngå (MP); Gunnar Nilsson (S); Siw Persson (FP); Margit Sandéhn (S); Bengt Silfverstrand (S); Per Stenmarck (M); Ingrid Sundberg (M); Knut Wachtmeister (M); and Karin Wegestål (S).

===== 1985 =====
Results of the 1985 general election held on 15 September 1985:

Party		Votes per municipality																Total votes	%	Seats		
Party		Bjuv	Burlöv	Eslöv	Höga- näs	Höör	Hörby	Käv- linge	Lomma	Sjöbo	Skurup	Staffans- torp	Svalöv	Svedala	Trelle- borg	Vel- linge	Ystad	Total votes	%	Con.	Lev.	Tot.
Swedish Social Democratic Party	S	4,934	4,946	8,110	5,595	2,422	2,442	6,474	3,828	3,553	3,222	4,294	3,631	4,879	12,394	4,477	7,765	82,966	42.38%	5	0	5
Moderate Party	M	1,570	2,194	3,936	4,998	2,145	1,958	3,410	4,236	2,314	1,917	3,608	1,768	2,702	5,020	7,904	4,124	53,804	27.48%	3	0	3
Centre Party	C	819	417	3,167	1,410	1,511	2,658	1,416	702	2,766	1,901	1,077	1,762	1,121	2,342	1,172	2,213	26,454	13.51%	2	0	2
Liberal People's Party	FP	972	1,315	1,829	2,369	1,082	1,294	1,749	2,118	1,065	991	1,765	779	1,512	2,399	2,645	2,253	26,137	13.35%	1	1	2
Left Party – Communists	VPK	227	308	404	299	101	81	265	172	122	113	171	115	155	400	122	235	3,290	1.68%	0	0	0
Green Party	MP	64	126	232	264	175	170	162	169	163	136	175	93	91	277	204	193	2,694	1.38%	0	0	0
Other parties		7	19	23	31	12	21	21	14	12	37	15	83	49	38	20	28	430	0.22%	0	0	0
Valid votes		8,593	9,325	17,701	14,966	7,448	8,624	13,497	11,239	9,995	8,317	11,105	8,231	10,509	22,870	16,544	16,811	195,775	100.00%	11	1	12
Rejected votes		86	89	126	131	55	75	122	96	93	95	126	75	99	214	119	129	1,730	0.88%			
Total polled		8,679	9,414	17,827	15,097	7,503	8,699	13,619	11,335	10,088	8,412	11,231	8,306	10,608	23,084	16,663	16,940	197,505	91.01%			
Registered electors		9,624	10,290	20,017	16,457	8,450	9,844	14,681	12,003	11,507	9,395	11,948	9,187	11,415	25,636	17,674	18,885	217,013				
Turnout		90.18%	91.49%	89.06%	91.74%	88.79%	88.37%	92.77%	94.43%	87.67%	89.54%	94.00%	90.41%	92.93%	90.05%	94.28%	89.70%	91.01%				

The following candidates were elected: Bertil Fiskesjö (C); Per Olof Håkansson (S); Egon Jacobsson (S); John Johnsson (S); Stig Josefson (C); Siw Persson (FP); Hans Petersson (FP); Margit Sandéhn (S); Bengt Silfverstrand (S); Per Stenmarck (M); Ingrid Sundberg (M); and Knut Wachtmeister (M).

Permanent substitutions:

- Egon Jacobsson (S) resigned on 31 August 1986 and was replaced by Gunnar Nilsson (S) on 1 September 1986.

===== 1982 =====
Results of the 1982 general election held on 19 September 1982:

Party		Votes per municipality																Total votes	%	Seats		
Party		Bjuv	Burlöv	Eslöv	Höga- näs	Höör	Hörby	Käv- linge	Lomma	Sjöbo	Skurup	Staffans- torp	Svalöv	Svedala	Trelle- borg	Vel- linge	Ystad	Total votes	%	Con.	Lev.	Tot.
Swedish Social Democratic Party	S	5,258	5,378	8,190	5,896	2,351	2,475	6,535	3,885	3,550	3,406	4,242	3,727	4,980	12,685	4,413	7,894	84,865	43.75%	5	1	6
Moderate Party	M	1,733	2,381	4,193	5,678	2,237	2,091	3,451	4,512	2,389	1,921	3,630	1,889	2,634	5,235	7,713	4,540	56,227	28.98%	3	1	4
Centre Party	C	1,107	668	3,941	1,784	1,817	2,982	1,923	1,160	3,314	2,315	1,492	2,089	1,425	3,149	1,559	2,916	33,641	17.34%	2	0	2
Liberal People's Party	FP	408	506	896	867	496	700	724	821	570	486	721	341	573	1,201	998	1,077	11,385	5.87%	1	0	1
Left Party – Communists	VPK	211	327	414	288	112	83	269	185	130	120	168	122	182	453	149	240	3,453	1.78%	0	0	0
Green Party	MP	74	100	190	297	170	170	217	200	175	141	128	66	80	192	198	242	2,640	1.36%	0	0	0
Christian Democratic Unity	KDS	71	36	165	189	92	199	50	37	31	33	64	64	95	187	80	55	1,448	0.75%	0	0	0
K-Party	K-P	0	2	2	2	7	0	1	2	0	0	2	0	2	1	1	0	22	0.01%	0	0	0
Other parties		11	15	20	26	3	10	17	9	6	9	10	127	6	9	11	25	314	0.16%	0	0	0
Valid votes		8,873	9,413	18,011	15,027	7,285	8,710	13,187	10,811	10,165	8,431	10,457	8,425	9,977	23,112	15,122	16,989	193,995	100.00%	11	2	13
Rejected votes		63	71	162	102	59	69	108	107	81	84	110	75	115	197	126	141	1,670	0.85%			
Total polled		8,936	9,484	18,173	15,129	7,344	8,779	13,295	10,918	10,246	8,515	10,567	8,500	10,092	23,309	15,248	17,130	195,665	96.81%			
Registered electors		963	10,130	19,950	16,131	8,111	9,702	14,128	11,403	11,338	9,268	11,153	9,171	10,656	25,277	16,031	18,692	202,104				
Turnout		927.93%	93.62%	91.09%	93.79%	90.54%	90.49%	94.10%	95.75%	90.37%	91.88%	94.75%	92.68%	94.71%	92.21%	95.12%	91.64%	96.81%				

The following candidates were elected: Bo Arvidson (M); Bertil Fiskesjö (C); Per Olof Håkansson (S); Egon Jacobsson (S); John Johnsson (S); Stig Josefson (C); Gunnar Nilsson (S); Hans Petersson (FP); Margit Sandéhn (S); Bengt Silfverstrand (S); Per Stenmarck (M); Ingrid Sundberg (M); and Knut Wachtmeister (M).

==== 1970s ====
===== 1979 =====
Results of the 1979 general election held on 16 September 1979:

Party		Votes per municipality																Total votes	%	Seats		
Party		Bjuv	Burlöv	Eslöv	Höga- näs	Höör	Hörby	Käv- linge	Lomma	Sjöbo	Skurup	Staffans- torp	Svalöv	Svedala	Trelle- borg	Vel- linge	Ystad	Total votes	%	Con.	Lev.	Tot.
Swedish Social Democratic Party	S	5,036	4,705	7,594	5,682	2,068	2,191	6,259	3,693	3,237	3,218	3,627	3,501	4,474	11,996	4,003	7,512	78,796	41.74%	5	0	5
Moderate Party	M	1,388	1,920	3,502	4,832	1,879	1,788	2,782	3,805	2,009	1,625	3,057	1,586	2,196	4,586	6,514	3,801	47,270	25.04%	3	0	3
Centre Party	C	1,248	766	4,284	2,121	2,023	3,048	2,104	1,257	3,655	2,508	1,566	2,286	1,536	3,286	1,673	3,110	36,471	19.32%	2	0	2
Liberal People's Party	FP	818	1,029	1,612	1,516	849	1,198	1,436	1,425	888	829	1,317	690	1,074	2,370	2,072	1,998	21,121	11.19%	1	0	1
Left Party – Communists	VPK	168	313	439	260	112	85	250	178	141	107	231	109	163	343	109	273	3,281	1.74%	0	0	0
Christian Democratic Unity	KDS	48	26	113	140	59	184	32	19	25	28	20	42	35	164	33	49	1,017	0.54%	0	0	0
Communist Party of Sweden	SKP	0	2	3	7	1	0	2	7	2	1	2	3	1	8	8	3	50	0.03%	0	0	0
Workers' Party – The Communists	APK	1	1	1	1	6	0	0	2	0	0	0	21	2	0	1	0	36	0.02%	0	0	0
Other parties		31	29	50	108	41	23	26	28	21	27	31	133	21	56	80	40	745	0.39%	0	0	0
Valid votes		8,738	8,791	17,598	14,667	7,038	8,517	12,891	10,414	9,978	8,343	9,851	8,371	9,502	22,809	14,493	16,786	188,787	100.00%	11	0	11
Rejected votes		25	45	80	75	34	38	57	67	43	34	71	26	32	111	70	101	909	0.48%			
Total polled		8,763	8,836	17,678	14,742	7,072	8,555	12,948	10,481	10,021	8,377	9,922	8,397	9,534	22,920	14,563	16,887	189,696	92.46%			
Registered electors		9,520	9,479	19,569	15,853	7,843	9,426	13,756	10,994	11,064	9,061	10,473	9,152	10,133	24,995	15,274	18,576	205,168				
Turnout		92.05%	93.22%	90.34%	92.99%	90.17%	90.76%	94.13%	95.33%	90.57%	92.45%	94.74%	91.75%	94.09%	91.70%	95.35%	90.91%	92.46%				

The following candidates were elected: Per Olof Håkansson (S); Egon Jacobsson (S); John Johnsson (S); Stig Josefson (C); Thorsten Larsson (C); Hans Petersson (FP); Margit Sandéhn (S); Bengt Silfverstrand (S); Per Stenmarck (M); Ingrid Sundberg (M); and Knut Wachtmeister (M).

===== 1976 =====
Results of the 1976 general election held on 19 September 1976:

Party		Votes per municipality																Total votes	%	Seats		
Party		Bjuv	Burlöv	Eslöv	Höga- näs	Höör	Hörby	Käv- linge	Lomma	Sjöbo	Skurup	Staffans- torp	Svalöv	Svedala	Trelle- borg	Vel- linge	Ystad	Total votes	%	Con.	Lev.	Tot.
Swedish Social Democratic Party	S	4,950	4,745	7,531	5,660	1,941	2,049	6,037	3,638	3,026	3,067	3,594	3,422	4,125	12,035	4,094	7,857	77,771	42.09%	4	1	5
Centre Party	C	1,854	1,452	5,549	3,062	2,586	3,694	2,981	2,181	4,297	3,065	2,406	3,066	2,126	4,831	2,791	4,107	50,048	27.09%	3	0	3
Moderate Party	M	832	1,449	2,487	3,696	1,327	1,122	1,902	2,441	1,364	1,049	2,151	1,114	1,290	3,148	4,684	2,776	32,832	17.77%	2	0	2
People's Party	F	779	1,018	1,460	1,596	876	1,155	1,314	1,283	878	721	1,363	607	910	2,224	2,075	1,849	20,108	10.88%	1	0	1
Left Party – Communists	VPK	174	272	290	203	98	87	194	168	87	68	155	105	105	338	145	175	2,664	1.44%	0	0	0
Christian Democratic Unity	KDS	62	19	96	139	79	154	25	24	57	55	38	64	75	185	48	85	1,205	0.65%	0	0	0
Communist Party of Sweden	SKP	2	6	3	9	3	1	4	1	3	2	5	2	8	9	2	10	70	0.04%	0	0	0
Other parties		0	1	2	1	3	0	13	2	2	6	0	1	2	9	8	11	61	0.03%	0	0	0
Valid votes		8,653	8,962	17,418	14,366	6,913	8,262	12,470	9,738	9,714	8,033	9,712	8,381	8,641	22,779	13,847	16,870	184,759	100.00%	10	1	11
Rejected votes		15	38	49	60	20	18	37	40	21	22	37	23	19	67	53	53	572	0.31%			
Total polled		8,668	9,000	17,467	14,426	6,933	8,280	12,507	9,778	9,735	8,055	9,749	8,404	8,660	22,846	13,900	16,923	185,331	93.62%			
Registered electors		9,253	9,532	18,985	15,256	7,558	9,045	13,170	10,184	10,642	8,640	10,176	8,984	9,091	24,646	14,493	18,308	197,963				
Turnout		93.68%	94.42%	92.00%	94.56%	91.73%	91.54%	94.97%	96.01%	91.48%	93.23%	95.80%	93.54%	95.26%	92.70%	95.91%	92.44%	93.62%				

The following candidates were elected: Sonja Fredgardh-Swensson (C); Per Olof Håkansson (S); John Johnsson (S); Hans Jönsson (S); Stig Josefson (C); Thorsten Larsson (C); Hans Petersson (F); Margit Sandéhn (S); Bengt Silfverstrand (S); Ingrid Sundberg (M); and Knut Wachtmeister (M).

Permanent substitutions:

- Hans Jönsson (S) resigned on 4 October 1978 and was replaced by Egon Jacobsson (S) on 5 October 1978.

===== 1973 =====
Results of the 1973 general election held on 16 September 1973:

Party		Votes per municipality																	Total votes	%	Seats		
Party		Bara	Bjuv	Burlöv	Eslöv	Höga- näs	Höör	Hörby	Käv- linge	Lomma	Sjöbo	Skurup	Staffans- torp	Svalöv	Svedala	Trelle- borg	Vel- linge	Ystad	Total votes	%	Con.	Lev.	Tot.
Swedish Social Democratic Party	S	962	4,820	4,368	7,459	5,603	1,803	1,865	5,382	3,609	2,888	2,928	3,044	3,412	2,505	11,922	3,590	7,899	74,059	44.23%	5	0	5
Centre Party	C	827	1,871	1,791	5,829	3,061	2,495	3,744	3,110	2,369	4,226	3,001	2,704	3,112	1,289	5,512	3,132	4,306	52,379	31.29%	3	1	4
Moderate Party	M	418	695	1,073	1,915	2,980	1,022	805	1,033	1,994	993	685	1,597	884	479	2,534	2,970	2,332	24,409	14.58%	1	1	2
People's Party	F	171	428	562	1,115	1,026	598	1,034	667	698	685	462	569	422	235	1,503	799	1,519	12,493	7.46%	1	0	1
Left Party – Communists	VPK	26	189	240	185	163	93	65	161	145	68	61	110	119	61	362	108	146	2,302	1.37%	0	0	0
Christian Democratic Unity	KDS	12	50	16	127	147	114	232	27	24	54	74	18	55	70	252	86	84	1,442	0.86%	0	0	0
Communist Party of Sweden	SKP	0	8	7	18	41	2	4	7	1	5	7	3	1	4	21	8	38	175	0.10%	0	0	0
Communist League Marxist–Leninists (the revolutionaries)	KFML(r)	1	3	7	36	7	6	11	1	2	4	5	1	1	3	29	2	17	136	0.08%	0	0	0
Other parties		0	0	2	1	0	0	0	1	0	1	4	1	0	0	9	8	2	29	0.02%	0	0	0
Valid votes		2,417	8,064	8,066	16,685	13,028	6,133	7,760	10,389	8,842	8,924	7,227	8,047	8,006	4,646	22,144	10,703	16,343	167,424	100.00%	10	2	12
Rejected votes		5	16	28	32	29	20	25	29	25	15	23	23	20	10	80	34	43	457	0.27%			
Total polled		2,422	8,080	8,094	16,717	13,057	6,153	7,785	10,418	8,867	8,939	7,250	8,070	8,026	4,656	22,224	10,737	16,386	167,881	92.74%			
Registered electors		2,555	8,656	8,662	18,317	13,997	6,773	8,587	11,050	9,308	9,917	7,894	8,476	8,650	4,949	24,139	11,260	17,837	181,027				
Turnout		94.79%	93.35%	93.44%	91.26%	93.28%	90.85%	90.66%	94.28%	95.26%	90.14%	91.84%	95.21%	92.79%	94.08%	92.07%	95.36%	91.87%	92.74%				

The following candidates were elected: Sonja Fredgardh-Swensson (C); Per Olof Håkansson (S); Mary Holmqvist (S); John Johnsson (S); Hans Jönsson (S); Stig Josefson (C); Inger Ingvar-Svensson (C); Gunnar Lange (S); Thorsten Larsson (C); Hans Petersson (F); Ingrid Sundberg (M); and Knut Wachtmeister (M).

Permanent substitutions:

- Mary Holmqvist (S) died on 16 June 1974 and was replaced by Margit Sandéhn (S) on 19 June 1974.

===== 1970 =====
Results of the 1970 general election held on 20 September 1970:

Party		Votes	%	Seats		
Party		Votes	%	Con.	Lev.	Tot.
Swedish Social Democratic Party	S	75,912	46.43%	5	0	5
Centre Party	C	44,395	27.15%	3	0	3
People's Party	F	20,823	12.74%	1	1	2
Moderate Party	M	19,586	11.98%	1	0	1
Christian Democratic Unity	KDS	1,376	0.84%	0	0	0
Left Party – Communists	VPK	1,253	0.77%	0	0	0
Communist League Marxists-Leninists	KFML	134	0.08%	0	0	0
Other parties		12	0.01%	0	0	0
Valid votes		163,491	100.00%	10	1	11
Rejected votes		307	0.19%			
Total polled inc. postal votes		163,798	90.46%			
Registered electors		181,065				

The following candidates were elected: Nils G. Hansson (C); Mary Holmqvist (S); John Johnsson (S); Hans Jönsson (S); Stig Josefson (C); Gunnar Lange (S); Thorsten Larsson (C); Alvar Mårtensson (S); Eric Nelander (F); Hans Petersson (F); and Ingrid Sundberg (M).
