= Results of the 1982 Swedish general election =

Sweden held a general election on 19 September 1982, resulting in a change of government as the Social Democrats and Olof Palme returned to government after six years in opposition. 45.6% of the vote marked the party's strongest showing since winning more than half the vote in 1968. The Moderates became larger than the Centre Party and the People's Party combined. Having already been larger than both in 1979, the Moderates firmly established itself as the dominant force on the centre-right opposition as both of their former coalition partners suffered sizeable losses in seats.

== Results ==
Party	Votes	%	Seats			
Party	Votes	%	Con.	Lev.	Tot.	+/–
Swedish Social Democratic Party	2,533,250	45.61	154	12	166	+12
Moderate Party	1,313,337	23.64	79	7	86	+13
Centre Party	859,618	15.48	52	4	56	−8
People's Party	327,770	5.90	14	7	21	−17
Left Party Communists	308,899	5.56	11	9	20	0
Christian Democratic Unity	103,820	1.87	0	0	0	0
Green Party	91,787	1.65	0	0	0	New
Workers Party Communists	5,745	0.10	0	0	0	0
Other parties	10,376	0.19	0	0	0	0
Total	5,554,602	100.00	310	39	349	0
Valid votes	5,554,602	99.07				
Invalid/blank votes	52,001	0.93				
Total votes	5,606,603	100.00				
Registered voters/turnout	6,130,993	91.45				
Source: Nohlen & Stöver

== Results by region ==
=== Percentage share ===
Location	Turnout	Share	Votes	S	M	C	FP	VPK	KDS	MP	Other	Left	Right
Götaland	91.7	48.1	2,672,831	43.3	25.0	16.9	6.5	4.4	2.1	1.5	0.3	47.7	48.4
Svealand	91.0	37.1	2,060,304	45.3	26.2	12.6	5.7	6.6	1.4	1.9	0.3	51.9	44.5
Norrland	91.0	14.8	821,467	53.9	12.8	17.8	4.6	6.7	2.3	1.4	0.4	60.6	35.3
Total	91.4	100.0	5,554,602	45.6	23.5	15.5	5.9	5.6	1.9	1.7	0.3	51.1	45.0
Source: SCB

=== By votes ===
Location	Turnout	Share	Votes	S	M	C	FP	VPK	KDS	MP	Other	Left	Right
Götaland	91.7	48.1	2,672,831	1,157,138	668,387	452,865	172,574	117,696	56,370	41,038	6,763	1,274,834	1,293,826
Svealand	91.0	37.1	2,060,304	933,597	539,495	260,482	117,301	136,168	28,196	39,385	5,680	1,069,765	917,278
Norrland	91.0	14.8	821,467	442,515	105,455	146,271	37,895	55,035	19,254	11,364	3,678	497,550	289,621
Total	91.4	100.0	5,554,602	2,533,250	1,313,337	859,618	327,770	308,899	103,820	91,787	16,121	2,842,149	2,500,725
Source: SCB

== Results by constituency ==
=== Percentage share ===
Location	Land	Turnout	Share	Votes	S	M	C	FP	VPK	KDS	MP	Other	Left	Right	Margin
Location		%	%		%	%	%	%	%	%	%	%	%	%	
Blekinge	G	91.5	1.9	103,262	52.7	18.8	15.6	5.6	4.0	1.9	1.2	0.1	56.8	40.1	17,220
Bohuslän	G	91.4	3.4	186,663	40.5	25.3	16.4	9.3	4.6	2.0	1.7	0.2	45.1	51.0	11,002
Gothenburg	G	90.1	5.1	285,891	40.8	27.5	7.7	9.7	10.0	1.4	2.0	0.9	50.8	44.9	16,973
Gotland	G	90.6	0.7	37,646	42.1	18.3	27.5	5.1	3.7	1.0	2.3	0.1	45.8	50.8	1,874
Gävleborg	N	90.7	3.6	202,022	54.4	13.9	16.9	4.4	6.7	1.7	1.8	0.2	61.1	35.2	52,250
Halland	G	92.5	2.8	155,884	37.8	26.1	23.9	5.9	3.2	1.3	1.7	0.1	41.0	55.8	23,110
Jämtland	N	90.0	1.7	92,758	52.0	13.6	22.6	3.9	4.6	1.5	1.6	0.1	56.6	40.1	15,273
Jönköping	G	92.6	3.7	204,335	40.1	22.5	19.7	6.7	3.0	6.8	1.1	0.1	43.1	48.9	11,814
Kalmar	G	91.7	3.0	165,881	46.1	20.8	21.7	3.9	3.8	2.3	1.3	0.1	49.9	46.4	5,886
Kopparberg	S	90.7	3.5	194,260	50.1	17.0	19.9	4.4	4.9	1.7	1.9	0.2	55.0	41.2	26,811
Kristianstad	G	90.9	3.4	187,725	42.0	26.5	19.6	6.2	2.3	1.6	1.5	0.3	44.3	52.3	15,089
Kronoberg	G	91.4	2.1	115,714	41.1	23.1	23.9	4.0	4.3	1.9	1.6	0.1	45.4	51.0	6,530
Fyrstadskretsen	G	91.2	5.5	306,611	47.6	30.6	8.1	6.0	4.8	0.8	1.8	0.4	52.3	44.7	23,332
Malmöhus	G	92.8	3.5	193,995	43.7	29.0	17.3	5.9	1.8	0.7	1.4	0.1	45.5	52.2	12,935
Norrbotten	N	90.6	3.2	175,156	58.8	11.8	11.6	3.1	10.4	2.2	1.0	1.2	69.2	26.5	74,757
Skaraborg	G	91.5	3.3	181,020	39.6	23.2	23.0	6.4	3.4	3.0	1.2	0.1	43.1	52.6	17,209
Stockholm	S	90.0	8.2	453,535	39.4	33.7	7.3	5.9	10.1	1.0	2.2	0.5	49.5	46.9	11,702
Stockholm County	S	92.1	9.6	535,603	39.9	33.8	10.2	5.9	6.6	1.1	2.2	0.4	46.6	49.9	17,983
Södermanland	S	92.5	3.0	166,737	52.8	19.6	14.1	5.9	4.1	1.6	1.7	0.2	56.9	39.6	28,940
Uppsala	S	91.7	2.9	160,073	44.6	22.3	16.9	6.3	6.1	1.5	2.0	0.3	50.7	45.5	8,339
Värmland	S	91.6	3.5	196,415	50.4	20.0	17.0	5.3	4.8	1.1	1.4	0.1	55.2	42.2	25,367
Västerbotten	N	90.9	3.0	165,350	49.3	12.7	19.2	7.8	5.5	3.9	1.2	0.3	54.8	39.7	24,936
Västernorrland	N	92.2	3.4	186,181	53.7	12.4	20.9	3.8	5.3	2.3	1.4	0.2	59.0	37.1	40,713
Västmanland	S	91.6	3.0	167,995	52.6	19.4	13.4	5.9	5.5	1.5	1.4	0.2	58.2	38.7	32,754
Älvsborg N	G	92.1	2.9	162,681	42.7	21.9	19.8	7.6	4.3	2.0	1.6	0.1	47.0	49.3	3,882
Älvsborg S	G	92.9	2.2	120,376	42.2	25.2	19.7	5.6	3.8	1.9	1.4	0.1	46.0	50.5	5,472
Örebro	S	91.5	3.3	185,686	52.2	17.4	14.9	5.6	5.4	2.8	1.5	0.2	57.6	37.9	36,557
Östergötland	G	92.0	4.8	265,147	48.4	22.9	15.0	4.7	5.1	2.5	1.4	0.2	53.0	43.0	26,514
Total		91.4	100.0	5,554,602	45.6	23.6	15.5	5.9	5.6	1.9	1.7	0.3	51.1	45.0	341,424
Source: SCB

=== By votes ===
Location	Land	Turnout	Share	Votes	S	M	C	FP	VPK	KDS	MP	Other	Left	Right	Margin
Location		%	%												
Blekinge	G	91.5	1.9	103,262	54,462	19,457	16,134	5,802	4,151	1,961	1,194	101	58,613	41,393	17,220
Bohuslän	G	91.4	3.4	186,663	75,513	47,197	30,558	17,394	8,634	3,653	3,263	451	84,147	95,149	11,002
Gothenburg	G	90.1	5.1	285,891	116,653	78,625	21,965	27,800	28,710	3,912	5,794	2,432	145,363	128,390	16,973
Gotland	G	90.6	0.7	37,646	15,852	6,880	10,343	1,903	1,400	381	852	35	17,252	19,126	1,874
Gävleborg	N	90.7	3.6	202,022	109,831	28,033	34,193	8,982	13,627	3,346	3,564	446	123,458	71,208	52,250
Halland	G	92.5	2.8	155,884	58,925	40,628	37,239	9,181	5,013	2,025	2,707	166	63,938	87,048	23,110
Jämtland	N	90.0	1.7	92,758	48,230	12,625	20,971	3,643	4,282	1,431	1,497	79	52,512	37,239	15,273
Jönköping	G	92.6	3.7	204,335	81,988	45,964	40,200	13,704	6,066	13,879	2,303	231	88,054	99,868	11,814
Kalmar	G	91.7	3.0	165,881	76,527	34,480	35,982	6,481	6,302	3,807	2,151	151	82,829	76,943	5,886
Kopparberg	S	90.7	3.5	194,260	97,316	32,969	38,674	8,473	9,611	3,263	3,658	296	106,927	80,116	26,811
Kristianstad	G	90.9	3.4	187,725	78,781	49,796	36,730	11,686	4,342	3,047	2,752	591	83,123	98,212	15,089
Kronoberg	G	91.4	2.1	115,714	47,507	26,695	27,642	4,680	4,980	2,205	1,884	121	52,487	59,017	6,530
Fyrstadskretsen	G	91.2	5.5	306,611	145,847	93,930	24,863	18,323	14,601	2,393	5,449	1,205	160,448	137,116	23,332
Malmöhus	G	92.8	3.5	193,995	84,865	56,227	33,641	11,385	3,453	1,448	2,640	336	88,318	101,253	12,935
Norrbotten	N	90.6	3.2	175,156	103,006	20,638	20,310	5,431	18,130	3,828	1,676	2,137	121,136	46,379	74,757
Skaraborg	G	91.5	3.3	181,020	71,768	41,932	41,702	11,534	6,191	5,474	2,163	256	77,959	95,168	17,209
Stockholm	S	90.0	8.2	453,535	178,565	152,817	33,062	26,721	45,737	4,371	10,021	2,241	224,302	212,600	11,702
Stockholm County	S	92.1	9.6	535,603	213,918	181,144	54,654	31,600	35,497	5,676	11,726	1,388	249,415	267,398	17,983
Södermanland	S	92.5	3.0	166,737	88,077	32,742	23,476	9,758	6,839	2,741	2,807	297	94,916	65,976	28,940
Uppsala	S	91.7	2.9	160,073	71,368	35,693	27,027	10,086	9,777	2,353	3,248	521	81,145	72,806	8,339
Värmland	S	91.6	3.5	196,415	98,986	39,268	33,335	10,380	9,364	2,087	2,757	238	108,350	82,983	25,367
Västerbotten	N	90.9	3.0	165,350	81,480	21,050	31,805	12,842	9,153	6,402	2,045	573	90,633	65,697	24,936
Västernorrland	N	92.2	3.4	186,181	99,968	23,109	38,992	6,997	9,843	4,247	2,582	443	109,811	69,098	40,713
Västmanland	S	91.6	3.0	167,995	88,427	32,525	22,595	9,838	9,285	2,587	2,337	401	97,712	64,958	32,754
Älvsborg N	G	92.1	2.9	162,681	69,461	35,601	32,269	12,393	6,920	3,309	2,554	174	76,381	80,263	3,882
Älvsborg S	G	92.9	2.2	120,376	50,772	30,318	23,741	6,787	4,602	2,339	1,702	115	55,374	60,846	5,472
Örebro	S	91.5	3.3	185,686	96,940	32,337	27,659	10,445	10,058	5,118	2,831	298	106,998	70,441	36,557
Östergötland	G	92.0	4.8	265,147	128,217	60,657	39,856	13,521	12,331	6,537	3,630	398	140,548	114,034	26,514
Total		91.4	100.0	5,554,602	2,533,250	1,313,337	859,618	327,770	308,899	103,820	91,787	16,121	2,842,149	2,500,725	341,424
Source: SCB

== 1979–1982 bloc comparison ==
=== Percentage share ===
Constituency	Land	Votes 1979	Left 1979	Right 1979	Win 1979	Votes 1982	Left 1982	Right 1982	Win 1982	Change
Constituency			%	%	%		%	%	%	%
Blekinge	G	103,037	53.83	44.39	11.44	103,262	56.76	40.09	16.67	5.23
Bohuslän	G	179,085	42.01	56.26	14.25	186,663	45.08	50.97	5.89	8.36
Gothenburg	G	282,944	47.46	50.44	2.98	285,891	50.85	44.91	5.94	8.92
Gotland	G	36,585	42.94	56.12	13.18	37,646	45.83	50.80	4.97	8.21
Gävleborg	N	198,508	58.97	39.06	19.91	202,022	61.11	35.25	25.86	5.95
Halland	G	150,322	38.77	60.10	21.33	155,884	41.02	55.84	14.82	6.51
Jämtland	N	91,048	54.88	43.19	11.69	92,758	56.61	40.15	16.46	4.77
Jönköping	G	201,877	40.59	54.87	14.28	204,335	43.09	48.87	5.78	8.50
Kalmar	G	164,457	48.07	49.75	1.68	165,881	49.93	46.38	3.55	5.23
Kopparberg	S	189,904	52.78	45.07	7.71	194,260	55.04	41.24	13.80	6.09
Kristianstad	G	184,372	41.70	56.23	14.53	187,725	44.28	52.32	8.04	6.49
Kronoberg	G	113,467	42.34	55.89	13.55	115,714	45.36	51.00	5.64	7.91
Malmö area	G	304,737	49.86	48.49	1.37	306,611	52.33	44.72	7.61	6.24
Malmöhus	G	188,787	43.48	55.55	12.07	193,995	45.53	52.19	6.66	5.41
Norrbotten	N	172,587	65.64	29.98	35.66	175,156	69.16	26.48	42.68	7.02
Skaraborg	G	177,196	39.68	56.94	17.26	181,020	43.07	52.57	9.50	7.76
Stockholm	S	453,287	48.31	49.89	1.58	453,535	49.46	46.88	2.58	4.16
Stockholm County	S	510,210	45.03	53.46	8.43	535,603	46.57	49.92	3.35	5.08
Södermanland	S	163,741	54.81	43.34	11.47	166,737	56.93	39.57	17.36	5.89
Uppsala	S	153,866	48.94	49.32	0.38	160,073	50.69	45.48	5.21	5.59
Värmland	S	195,704	52.53	46.09	6.44	196,415	55.16	42.25	12.91	6.47
Västerbotten	N	161,941	51.87	44.19	7.68	165,350	54.81	39.73	15.08	7.40
Västernorrland	N	185,794	56.62	40.91	15.71	186,181	58.98	37.11	21.87	6.16
Västmanland	S	164,056	55.60	42.32	13.28	167,995	58.16	38.67	19.49	6.21
Älvsborg N	G	158,073	44.18	54.09	9.91	162,681	46.95	49.34	2.39	7.52
Älvsborg S	G	118,834	43.68	54.60	10.92	120,376	46.00	50.55	4.55	6.37
Örebro	S	183,059	54.43	42.78	11.65	185,686	57.62	37.94	19.68	8.03
Östergötland	G	261,160	51.89	46.29	5.60	265,147	53.01	43.01	10.00	4.40
Total		5,448,638	48.85	49.00	0.15	5,554,602	51.17	45.02	6.15	6.30
Source: SCB

=== By votes ===
Constituency	Land	Votes 1979	Left 1979	Right 1979	Win 1979	Votes 1982	Left 1982	Right 1982	Win 1982	Change
Constituency	#									
Blekinge	G	103,037	55,466	45,739	9,727	103,262	58,613	41,393	17,220	7,493
Bohuslän	G	179,085	75,225	100,751	25,526	186,663	84,147	95,149	11,002	14,524
Gothenburg	G	282,944	134,297	142,726	8,429	285,891	145,363	128,390	16,973	25,402
Gotland	G	36,585	15,710	20,530	4,820	37,646	17,252	19,126	1,874	2,946
Gävleborg	N	198,508	117,057	77,540	39,517	202,022	123,458	71,208	52,250	12,733
Halland	G	150,322	58,282	90,342	32,060	155,884	63,938	87,048	23,110	8,950
Jämtland	N	91,048	49,965	39,325	10,640	92,758	52,512	37,239	15,273	4,633
Jönköping	G	201,877	81,942	110,766	28,824	204,335	88,054	99,868	11,814	17,010
Kalmar	G	164,457	79,062	81,825	2,763	165,881	82,829	76,943	5,886	8,649
Kopparberg	S	189,904	100,226	85,598	14,628	194,260	106,927	80,116	26,811	12,183
Kristianstad	G	184,372	76,891	103,676	26,785	187,725	83,123	98,212	15,089	11,696
Kronoberg	G	113,467	48,042	63,417	15,375	115,714	52,487	59,017	6,530	8,845
Malmö area	G	304,737	151,950	147,778	4,172	306,611	160,448	137,116	23,332	19,160
Malmöhus	G	188,787	82,077	104,862	22,785	193,995	88,318	101,253	12,935	9,850
Norrbotten	N	172,587	113,278	51,741	61,537	175,156	121,136	46,379	74,757	13,220
Skaraborg	G	177,196	70,318	100,897	30,579	181,020	77,959	95,168	17,209	13,370
Stockholm	S	453,287	218,987	226,161	7,174	453,535	224,302	212,600	11,702	18,876
Stockholm County	S	510,210	229,723	272,758	43,035	535,603	249,415	267,398	17,983	25,052
Södermanland	S	163,741	89,739	70,961	18,778	166,737	94,916	65,976	28,940	10,162
Uppsala	S	153,866	75,309	75,892	583	160,073	81,145	72,806	8,339	8,922
Värmland	S	195,704	102,813	90,204	12,609	196,415	108,350	82,983	25,367	12,758
Västerbotten	N	161,941	83,992	71,558	12,434	165,350	90,633	65,697	24,936	12,502
Västernorrland	N	185,794	105,198	76,006	29,192	186,181	109,811	69,098	40,713	11,521
Västmanland	S	164,056	91,222	69,429	21,793	167,995	97,712	64,958	32,754	10,961
Älvsborg N	G	158,073	69,837	85,508	15,671	162,681	76,381	80,263	3,882	11,789
Älvsborg S	G	118,834	51,904	64,883	12,979	120,376	55,374	60,846	5,472	7,507
Örebro	S	183,059	99,634	78,305	21,329	185,686	106,998	70,441	36,557	15,228
Östergötland	G	261,160	133,508	120,880	12,628	265,147	140,548	114,034	26,514	13,886
Total		5,448,638	2,661,654	2,670,058	8,404	5,554,602	2,842,149	2,500,725	341,424	349,828
Source: SCB

== Results by municipality ==
Votes by municipality. The municipalities are the color of the party that got the most votes within the coalition that won relative majority.

Cartogram of the map to the left with each municipality rescaled to the number of valid votes cast.

Map showing the voting shifts from the 1979 to the 1982 election. Darker blue indicates a municipality voted more towards the parties that formed the centre-right bloc. Darker red indicates a municipality voted more towards the parties that form the left-wing bloc.

Votes by municipality as a scale from red/Left-wing bloc to blue/Centre-right bloc.

Cartogram of vote with each municipality rescaled in proportion to number of valid votes cast. Deeper blue represents a relative majority for the centre-right coalition, brighter red represents a relative majority for the left-wing coalition.

=== Blekinge ===
Location	Turnout	Share	Votes	S	M	C	FP	VPK	KDS	MP	Other	L-vote	R-vote	Left	Right	Margin
Location		%			%	%	%	%	%	%	%			%	%	
Karlshamn	90.8	20.8	21,525	54.8	17.5	13.8	5.0	5.3	2.2	1.3	0.1	12,942	7,812	60.1	36.3	5,130
Karlskrona	91.5	40.0	41,271	50.5	20.4	15.2	6.7	3.8	2.2	1.2	0.0	22,417	17,456	54.3	42.3	4,961
Olofström	91.7	9.3	9,592	56.3	14.2	16.1	5.1	4.3	2.6	1.0	0.3	5,820	3,401	60.7	35.5	2,419
Ronneby	92.1	19.5	20,184	54.1	17.3	18.5	4.5	3.5	0.8	1.2	0.1	11,625	8,124	57.6	40.2	3,501
Sölvesborg	91.6	10.4	10,690	51.3	22.6	14.9	5.5	3.0	1.7	0.9	0.1	5,809	4,600	54.3	43.0	1,209
Total	91.5	1.9	103,262	52.7	18.8	15.6	5.6	4.0	1.9	1.2	0.1	58,613	41,393	56.8	40.1	17,220
Source: SCB

=== Dalarna ===
Kopparberg County

Location	Turnout	Share	Votes	S	M	C	FP	VPK	KDS	MP	Other	L-vote	R-vote	Left	Right	Margin
Location		%			%	%	%	%	%	%	%			%	%	
Avesta	92.8	9.3	18,014	58.9	11.9	16.5	3.5	5.9	1.7	1.5	0.1	11,664	5,744	64.7	31.9	5,920
Borlänge	91.5	16.2	31,434	57.2	15.5	14.6	3.9	5.5	1.3	1.8	0.3	19,691	10,685	62.6	34.0	9,006
Falun	90.2	17.7	34,386	41.9	24.1	19.3	6.1	4.5	1.7	2.3	0.2	15,938	17,015	46.4	49.5	1,077
Gagnef	92.1	3.3	6,468	45.3	15.3	27.4	3.8	3.3	2.7	2.0	0.1	3,143	3,009	48.6	46.5	134
Hedemora	91.3	5.9	11,378	50.8	16.3	20.0	3.8	4.7	1.8	2.6	0.1	6,314	4,550	55.5	40.0	1,764
Leksand	90.3	4.9	9,522	37.6	21.3	27.7	5.4	2.5	3.5	1.9	0.0	3,824	5,185	40.2	54.5	1,361
Ludvika	91.1	11.2	21,687	61.7	12.6	11.1	3.5	8.2	1.0	1.7	0.2	15,162	5,903	70.0	27.2	9,259
Malung	91.7	4.3	8,307	49.9	15.5	23.2	5.1	3.8	1.0	1.4	0.2	4,456	3,630	53.6	43.7	826
Mora	89.1	6.7	12,962	41.5	19.4	28.5	3.7	3.5	1.5	1.8	0.1	5,842	6,686	45.1	51.6	844
Orsa	86.8	2.5	4,866	44.2	19.1	21.8	4.4	5.1	2.6	2.7	0.0	2,399	2,208	49.3	45.4	191
Rättvik	85.4	3.8	7,329	37.6	20.8	27.9	5.7	3.8	1.8	2.3	0.1	3,036	3,987	41.4	54.4	951
Smedjebacken	92.8	4.6	8,926	63.4	10.7	14.7	3.4	5.6	0.8	1.2	0.2	6,162	2,567	69.0	28.8	3,595
Säter	91.4	3.8	7,374	43.4	17.4	27.6	4.1	3.9	1.8	1.7	0.1	3,489	3,618	47.3	49.1	129
Vansbro	90.8	3.0	5,913	47.2	14.4	25.5	3.5	4.5	3.3	1.5	0.1	3,059	2,568	51.7	43.4	491
Älvdalen	87.8	2.9	5,694	45.3	12.6	31.8	4.1	3.0	1.7	1.6	0.0	2,748	2,761	48.3	48.5	13
Total	90.7	3.5	194,260	50.1	17.0	19.9	4.4	4.9	1.7	1.9	0.2	106,927	80,116	55.0	41.2	26,811
Source: SCB

=== Gotland ===
Location	Turnout	Share	Votes	S	M	C	FP	VPK	KDS	MP	Other	L-vote	R-vote	Left	Right	Margin
Location		%			%	%	%	%	%	%	%			%	%	
Gotland	90.6	100.0	37,646	42.1	18.3	27.5	5.1	3.7	1.0	2.3	0.1	17,252	19,126	45.8	50.8	1,874
Total	90.6	0.7	37,646	42.1	18.3	27.5	5.1	3.7	1.0	2.3	0.1	17,252	19,126	45.8	50.8	1,874
Source: SCB

=== Gävleborg ===
Location	Turnout	Share	Votes	S	M	C	FP	VPK	KDS	MP	Other	L-vote	R-vote	Left	Right	Margin
Location		%			%	%	%	%	%	%	%			%	%	
Bollnäs	89.6	9.5	19,213	50.0	12.7	21.3	5.1	7.2	1.8	1.8	0.2	10,984	7,516	57.2	39.1	3,468
Gävle	90.8	29.8	60,299	56.2	18.1	10.8	5.6	6.0	1.3	1.8	0.3	37,465	20,829	62.1	34.5	16,636
Hofors	92.5	4.4	8,929	66.2	9.6	9.5	3.2	9.6	0.6	1.0	0.2	6,776	1,996	75.9	22.4	4,780
Hudiksvall	89.1	12.5	25,245	46.9	12.9	24.6	3.4	7.5	2.3	2.2	0.2	13,745	10,327	54.4	40.9	3,418
Ljusdal	87.4	7.3	14,671	48.7	12.3	23.0	3.9	8.5	1.6	1.9	0.1	8,396	5,749	57.2	39.2	2,647
Nordanstig	89.8	4.0	8,139	44.0	9.2	30.5	3.9	6.7	3.6	2.1	0.1	4,120	3,547	50.6	43.6	573
Ockelbo	90.2	2.3	4,675	53.7	10.6	24.9	3.0	4.9	1.4	1.4	0.0	2,739	1,803	58.6	38.6	936
Ovanåker	92.3	4.7	9,566	44.0	10.5	28.6	6.8	2.8	4.0	3.1	0.2	4,477	4,394	46.8	45.9	83
Sandviken	92.9	14.5	29,385	60.7	13.9	12.7	3.8	6.1	1.1	1.3	0.4	19,645	8,924	66.9	30.4	10,721
Söderhamn	92.4	10.8	21,900	60.8	10.8	13.9	3.2	8.2	1.2	1.5	0.4	15,111	6,123	69.0	28.0	8,988
Total	90.7	3.6	202,022	54.4	13.9	16.9	4.4	6.7	1.7	1.8	0.2	123,458	71,208	61.1	35.2	52,250
Source: SCB

=== Halland ===
Location	Turnout	Share	Votes	S	M	C	FP	VPK	KDS	MP	Other	L-vote	R-vote	Left	Right	Margin
Location		%			%	%	%	%	%	%	%			%	%	
Falkenberg	93.0	15.3	23,915	36.5	22.5	30.8	4.8	2.3	1.4	1.6	0.0	9,291	13,901	38.9	58.1	4,610
Halmstad	92.2	33.0	51,497	45.2	26.0	15.4	5.7	4.3	1.4	2.0	0.1	25,463	24,222	49.4	47.0	1,241
Hylte	92.5	4.8	7,426	40.1	17.5	32.8	4.4	1.8	1.8	1.5	0.1	3,115	4,064	41.9	54.7	949
Kungsbacka	93.2	18.5	28,782	28.3	37.3	19.9	8.7	2.8	1.0	1.9	0.2	8,949	18,958	31.1	65.9	10,009
Laholm	91.6	9.2	14,270	30.2	23.2	37.4	4.3	2.1	1.2	1.5	0.0	4,614	9,260	32.3	64.9	4,646
Varberg	92.2	19.2	29,994	38.3	21.8	28.1	5.6	3.4	1.3	1.3	0.2	12,506	16,643	41.7	55.5	4,137
Total	92.5	2.8	155,884	37.8	26.1	23.9	5.9	3.2	1.3	1.7	0.1	63,938	87,048	41.0	55.8	23,110
Source: SCB

=== Jämtland ===
Location	Turnout	Share	Votes	S	M	C	FP	VPK	KDS	MP	Other	L-vote	R-vote	Left	Right	Margin
Location		%			%	%	%	%	%	%	%			%	%	
Berg	87.9	6.6	6,150	44.9	12.4	33.6	2.9	3.4	1.5	1.3	0.0	2,974	3,003	48.4	48.8	29
Bräcke	91.4	6.9	6,418	59.8	10.6	20.1	2.7	4.7	1.0	1.1	0.0	4,139	2,147	64.5	33.5	1,992
Härjedalen	87.3	9.5	8,828	59.1	11.3	18.5	3.5	5.3	1.1	1.1	0.1	5,682	2,948	64.4	33.4	2,734
Krokom	90.3	9.8	9,056	47.3	12.4	29.5	3.5	3.4	2.2	1.6	0.1	4,597	4,110	50.8	45.4	487
Ragunda	91.6	5.8	5,337	58.7	8.1	23.3	2.6	3.7	1.2	2.2	0.1	3,331	1,815	62.4	34.0	1,516
Strömsund	90.2	13.1	12,149	59.2	8.4	21.7	2.6	4.8	1.6	1.5	0.1	7,783	3,977	64.1	32.7	3,806
Åre	89.5	7.1	6,541	43.7	15.4	27.4	5.6	4.1	2.1	1.7	0.1	3,122	3,163	47.7	48.4	41
Östersund	90.5	41.3	38,279	49.5	17.2	20.0	4.8	5.1	1.5	1.8	0.1	20,884	16,076	54.6	42.0	4,808
Total	90.0	1.7	92,758	52.0	13.6	22.6	3.9	4.6	1.5	1.6	0.1	52,512	37,239	56.6	40.1	15,273
Source: SCB

=== Jönköping ===
Location	Turnout	Share	Votes	S	M	C	FP	VPK	KDS	MP	Other	L-vote	R-vote	Left	Right	Margin
Location		%			%	%	%	%	%	%	%			%	%	
Aneby	92.9	2.3	4,668	29.4	21.9	29.7	7.3	1.0	9.3	1.3	0.0	1,418	2,752	30.4	59.0	1,334
Eksjö	91.4	6.1	12,377	34.1	23.9	24.8	7.1	2.4	6.2	1.3	0.1	4,525	6,917	36.6	55.9	2,392
Gislaved	93.3	8.7	17,816	39.6	21.9	24.4	6.9	2.3	3.7	1.2	0.1	7,459	9,470	41.9	53.2	2,011
Gnosjö	93.8	2.8	5,634	32.3	23.7	23.2	8.6	2.4	9.4	0.5	0.0	1,952	3,123	34.6	55.4	1,171
Jönköping	92.7	35.8	73,186	43.9	23.9	13.3	6.9	3.7	7.1	1.1	0.2	34,840	32,276	47.6	44.1	2,564
Nässjö	92.9	10.8	22,072	45.1	19.2	19.2	6.7	2.9	5.6	1.1	0.2	10,592	9,971	48.0	45.2	621
Sävsjö	91.5	3.9	7,927	27.3	23.8	30.8	6.5	1.7	8.9	1.0	0.0	2,306	4,839	29.1	61.0	2,533
Tranås	92.2	6.2	12,762	43.8	22.7	14.7	7.0	3.2	7.4	1.2	0.1	5,995	5,669	47.0	44.4	326
Vaggeryd	93.5	4.0	8,172	39.0	19.7	21.5	5.4	3.9	9.8	0.7	0.0	3,509	3,806	42.9	46.6	297
Vetlanda	91.8	9.5	19,312	35.3	20.3	28.4	5.8	2.4	6.0	1.5	0.1	7,296	10,547	37.8	54.6	3,251
Värnamo	93.2	10.0	20,409	37.5	23.0	22.2	6.3	2.5	7.1	1.3	0.3	8,162	10,498	40.0	51.4	2,336
Total	92.6	3.7	204,335	40.1	22.5	19.7	6.7	3.0	6.8	1.1	0.1	88,054	99,868	43.1	48.9	11,814
Source: SCB

=== Kalmar ===
Location	Turnout	Share	Votes	S	M	C	FP	VPK	KDS	MP	Other	L-vote	R-vote	Left	Right	Margin
Location		%			%	%	%	%	%	%	%			%	%	
Borgholm	90.7	4.7	7,798	27.9	22.5	39.2	3.3	2.6	3.2	1.2	0.1	2,372	5,074	30.4	65.1	2,702
Emmaboda	92.8	4.6	7,634	47.8	15.2	27.6	2.8	3.4	1.7	1.4	0.0	3,907	3,483	51.2	45.6	424
Hultsfred	92.3	7.4	12,327	45.6	18.0	24.8	3.7	3.6	3.6	0.8	0.1	6,060	5,719	49.2	46.4	341
Högsby	92.5	3.4	5,571	48.4	16.4	23.2	3.3	3.9	3.8	0.9	0.0	2,914	2,391	52.3	42.9	523
Kalmar	91.4	22.3	37,012	46.7	26.3	14.9	4.8	4.0	1.6	1.6	0.1	18,741	17,043	50.6	46.0	1,698
Mönsterås	92.1	5.5	9,061	51.1	17.0	19.2	3.2	5.0	3.4	1.0	0.0	5,081	3,574	56.1	39.4	1,507
Mörbylånga	92.2	5.1	8,488	37.1	26.2	27.2	4.9	2.1	1.2	1.3	0.0	3,327	4,945	39.2	58.3	1,618
Nybro	92.3	8.9	14,712	47.2	17.7	24.2	3.1	4.2	2.6	1.0	0.0	7,551	6,627	51.3	45.0	924
Oskarshamn	91.9	11.3	18,670	51.5	19.7	15.8	5.0	4.2	2.6	1.1	0.0	10,407	7,561	55.7	40.5	2,846
Torsås	92.0	3.3	5,557	34.7	20.0	35.0	4.5	1.5	2.8	1.2	0.3	2,017	3,304	36.3	59.5	1,287
Vimmerby	92.5	6.7	11,128	38.1	20.1	33.4	2.7	2.8	1.5	1.1	0.3	4,552	6,261	40.9	56.3	1,709
Västervik	90.8	16.8	27,923	52.3	19.0	16.9	3.4	4.6	2.0	1.7	0.1	15,900	10,961	56.3	39.3	4,939
Total	91.7	3.0	165,881	46.1	20.8	21.7	3.9	3.8	2.3	1.3	0.1	82,829	76,943	49.9	46.4	5,886
Source: SCB

=== Kronoberg ===
Location	Turnout	Share	Votes	S	M	C	FP	VPK	KDS	MP	Other	L-vote	R-vote	Left	Right	Margin
Location		%			%	%	%	%	%	%	%			%	%	
Alvesta	91.5	11.2	12,939	40.3	21.2	27.7	3.8	3.7	1.9	1.3	0.2	5,688	6,814	44.0	52.7	1,126
Lessebo	94.1	5.3	6,152	57.1	15.3	15.0	2.6	7.2	1.6	1.3	0.1	3,952	2,019	64.2	32.8	1,933
Ljungby	90.6	15.5	17,880	37.5	21.0	29.6	4.7	3.2	2.6	1.4	0.0	7,275	9,886	40.7	55.3	2,611
Markaryd	91.2	6.5	7,522	44.7	18.9	23.9	4.7	3.2	3.2	1.4	0.0	3,602	3,570	47.9	47.5	32
Tingsryd	89.2	8.6	9,909	35.4	23.5	31.6	2.7	3.7	1.5	1.5	0.1	3,877	5,729	39.1	57.8	1,852
Uppvidinge	91.6	6.5	7,535	44.8	16.8	26.9	3.1	5.7	1.4	1.3	0.1	3,805	3,521	50.5	46.7	284
Växjö	91.7	37.3	43,152	40.0	27.3	19.5	4.6	4.9	1.6	2.0	0.1	19,342	22,167	44.8	51.4	2,825
Älmhult	91.9	9.2	10,625	43.2	23.1	23.4	3.5	3.3	2.0	1.5	0.0	4,946	5,311	46.6	50.0	365
Total	91.4	2.1	115,714	41.1	23.1	23.9	4.0	4.3	1.9	1.6	0.1	52,487	59,017	45.4	51.0	6,530
Source: SCB

=== Norrbotten ===
Location	Turnout	Share	Votes	S	M	C	FP	VPK	KDS	MP	Other	L-vote	R-vote	Left	Right	Margin
Location		%			%	%	%	%	%	%	%			%	%	
Arjeplog	86.2	1.5	2,668	51.1	10.1	15.5	3.0	15.6	2.8	1.0	0.9	1,780	762	66.7	28.6	1,018
Arvidsjaur	90.6	3.4	5,872	59.8	8.2	13.0	3.8	11.0	2.7	0.5	1.0	4,155	1,470	70.8	25.0	2,685
Boden	91.6	11.3	19,849	59.0	14.3	11.5	3.8	7.7	2.4	0.8	0.6	13,235	5,880	66.7	29.6	7,355
Gällivare	87.7	9.1	16,008	58.0	12.4	7.2	1.9	16.5	1.2	0.8	1.9	11,929	3,457	74.5	21.6	8,472
Haparanda	88.4	3.0	5,173	52.9	15.6	18.6	2.3	6.1	1.6	1.2	1.6	3,054	1,890	59.0	36.5	1,164
Jokkmokk	84.3	2.6	4,585	61.6	11.9	8.7	3.3	10.2	1.1	2.4	0.9	3,291	1,094	71.8	23.9	2,197
Kalix	92.2	7.5	13,091	65.2	9.7	13.0	2.5	5.8	1.3	0.9	1.6	9,294	3,302	71.0	25.2	5,992
Kiruna	87.9	10.1	17,626	62.7	10.0	5.4	2.6	15.5	1.3	0.9	1.6	13,792	3,164	78.2	18.0	10,628
Luleå	91.5	25.1	43,957	55.6	14.9	11.4	4.1	10.1	1.8	1.2	1.0	28,854	13,342	65.6	30.4	15,512
Pajala	88.3	3.3	5,841	50.3	10.2	11.9	1.6	19.5	2.1	0.5	3.8	4,078	1,386	69.8	23.7	2,692
Piteå	94.0	15.0	26,324	62.3	9.3	13.6	3.0	6.2	4.2	0.8	0.6	18,038	6,809	68.5	25.9	11,229
Älvsbyn	91.7	3.7	6,560	60.1	7.3	12.9	3.2	10.0	4.3	0.9	1.3	4,604	1,535	70.2	23.4	3,069
Överkalix	88.8	2.0	3,543	63.0	5.4	16.9	2.1	9.3	0.6	0.9	1.7	2,563	865	72.3	24.4	1,698
Övertorneå	89.9	2.3	4,059	50.1	9.8	23.5	1.8	10.7	1.7	0.6	1.8	2,469	1,423	60.8	35.1	1,046
Total	90.6	3.2	175,156	58.8	11.8	11.6	3.1	10.4	2.2	1.0	1.2	121,136	46,379	69.2	26.5	74,757
Source: SCB

=== Skåne ===
Skåne was divided into two separate counties at the time. Malmöhus was divided into Fyrstadskretsen (Four-city constituency) based around the Öresund urban areas and one covering the more rural parts of the county. Kristianstad County was one constituency for the whole county.

==== Kristianstad ====
Location	Turnout	Share	Votes	S	M	C	FP	VPK	KDS	MP	Other	L-vote	R-vote	Left	Right	Margin
Location		%			%	%	%	%	%	%	%			%	%	
Bromölla	93.2	4.2	7,827	64.7	13.1	10.1	5.3	5.0	0.8	0.9	0.2	5,449	2,229	69.6	28.5	3,220
Båstad	92.0	4.5	8,458	19.1	40.1	29.6	6.9	0.8	0.9	1.9	0.6	1,679	6,483	19.9	77.6	4,804
Hässleholm	91.1	17.4	32,740	38.9	25.4	23.1	6.3	2.2	2.4	1.4	0.3	13,458	17,927	41.1	54.8	4,469
Klippan	90.4	5.8	10,795	43.0	27.3	20.4	4.8	1.8	1.2	1.0	0.4	4,836	5,676	44.8	52.6	840
Kristianstad	91.2	25.2	47,254	46.1	25.5	14.8	7.8	2.6	1.5	1.6	0.2	22,983	22,718	48.6	48.1	265
Osby	91.5	5.0	9,375	46.5	19.0	21.9	5.2	3.1	2.6	1.4	0.3	4,649	4,324	49.6	46.1	325
Perstorp	90.3	2.4	4,547	46.1	25.4	17.3	5.5	2.1	2.0	0.9	0.6	2,193	2,196	48.2	48.3	3
Simrishamn	88.5	7.4	13,886	40.5	26.9	21.5	6.5	1.5	0.7	1.5	0.9	5,832	7,627	42.0	54.9	1,795
Tomelilla	87.4	4.5	8,463	36.0	24.7	29.9	5.5	1.5	0.8	1.4	0.1	3,177	5,083	37.5	60.1	1,906
Åstorp	92.0	4.2	7,944	50.8	24.7	15.0	4.6	2.9	1.2	0.8	0.1	4,265	3,516	53.7	44.3	749
Ängelholm	91.1	10.9	20,489	32.4	37.3	19.7	5.1	2.2	1.2	2.0	0.1	7,076	12,727	34.5	62.1	5,651
Örkelljunga	90.9	3.2	6,090	28.9	33.8	24.4	6.1	1.1	4.3	1.3	0.1	1,828	3,911	30.0	64.2	2,083
Östra Göinge	91.8	5.3	9,857	54.9	16.9	16.2	5.5	2.9	2.0	1.3	0.4	5,698	3,795	57.8	38.5	1,903
Total	90.9	3.4	187,725	42.0	26.5	19.6	6.2	2.3	1.6	1.5	0.3	83,123	98,212	44.3	52.3	15,089
Source: SCB

==== Malmö area ====
Location	Turnout	Share	Votes	S	M	C	FP	VPK	KDS	MP	Other	L-vote	R-vote	Left	Right	Margin
Location		%			%	%	%	%	%	%	%			%	%	
Helsingborg	90.7	22.6	69,431	46.4	30.6	10.1	5.8	3.8	1.1	1.9	0.3	34,874	32,282	50.2	46.5	2,592
Landskrona	92.0	7.9	24,245	56.3	25.5	7.8	4.9	3.4	0.5	1.3	0.3	14,490	9,265	59.8	38.2	5,225
Lund	93.1	17.2	52,677	37.7	30.7	11.3	7.9	8.2	0.8	3.3	0.3	24,148	26,259	45.8	49.8	2,111
Malmö	90.5	52.3	160,258	50.0	31.4	6.2	5.6	4.2	0.7	1.3	0.4	86,936	69,310	54.2	43.2	17,626
Total	91.2	5.5	306,611	47.6	30.6	8.1	6.0	4.8	0.8	1.8	0.4	160,448	137,116	52.3	44.7	23,332
Source: SCB

==== Malmöhus ====
Location	Turnout	Share	Votes	S	M	C	FP	VPK	KDS	MP	Other	L-vote	R-vote	Left	Right	Margin
Location		%			%	%	%	%	%	%	%			%	%	
Bjuv	92.7	4.6	8,873	59.3	19.5	12.5	4.6	2.4	0.8	0.8	0.1	5,469	3,248	61.6	36.6	2,221
Burlöv	93.6	4.9	9,413	57.1	25.3	7.1	5.4	3.5	0.4	1.1	0.2	5,705	3,555	60.6	37.8	2,150
Eslöv	91.1	9.3	18,011	45.5	23.3	21.9	5.0	2.3	0.9	1.1	0.1	8,604	9,030	47.8	50.1	426
Höganäs	93.8	7.7	15,027	39.2	37.8	11.9	5.8	1.9	1.3	2.0	0.2	6,184	8,329	41.2	55.4	2,145
Hörby	90.5	4.5	8,710	28.4	24.0	34.2	8.0	1.0	2.3	2.0	0.1	2,558	5,773	29.4	66.3	3,215
Höör	90.5	3.8	7,285	32.3	30.7	24.9	6.8	1.5	1.3	2.3	0.1	2,463	4,550	33.8	62.5	2,087
Kävlinge	94.2	6.8	13,187	49.6	26.2	14.6	5.5	2.0	0.4	1.6	0.1	6,804	6,098	51.6	46.2	706
Lomma	95.7	5.6	10,811	35.9	41.7	10.7	7.6	1.7	0.3	1.8	0.1	4,070	6,493	37.6	60.1	2,423
Sjöbo	90.4	5.2	10,165	34.9	23.5	32.6	5.6	1.3	0.3	1.7	0.1	3,680	6,273	36.2	61.7	2,593
Skurup	91.9	4.3	8,431	40.4	22.8	27.5	5.8	1.4	0.4	1.7	0.1	3,526	4,722	41.8	56.0	1,196
Staffanstorp	94.7	5.4	10,457	40.6	34.7	14.3	6.9	1.6	0.6	1.2	0.1	4,410	5,843	42.2	55.9	1,433
Svalöv	92.7	4.3	8,425	44.2	22.4	24.8	4.0	1.4	0.8	0.8	1.5	3,849	4,319	45.7	51.3	470
Svedala	94.7	5.1	9,977	49.9	26.4	14.3	5.7	1.8	1.0	0.8	0.1	5,162	4,632	51.7	46.4	530
Trelleborg	92.2	11.9	23,112	54.9	22.7	13.6	5.2	2.0	0.8	0.8	0.0	13,138	9,585	56.8	41.5	3,553
Vellinge	95.1	7.8	15,122	29.2	51.0	10.3	6.6	1.0	0.5	1.3	0.1	4,562	10,270	30.2	67.9	5,708
Ystad	91.6	8.8	16,989	46.5	26.7	17.2	6.3	1.4	0.3	1.4	0.1	8,134	8,533	47.9	50.2	399
Total	92.8	3.5	193,995	43.7	29.0	17.3	5.9	1.8	0.7	1.4	0.1	88,318	101,253	45.5	52.2	12,935
Source: SCB

=== Stockholm County ===
==== Stockholm ====
Location	Turnout	Share	Votes	S	M	C	FP	VPK	KDS	MP	Other	L-vote	R-vote	Left	Right	Margin
Location		%			%	%	%	%	%	%	%			%	%	
Stockholm	90.0	100.0	453,535	39.4	33.7	7.3	5.9	10.1	1.0	2.2	0.5	224,302	212,600	49.5	46.9	11,702
Total	90.0	8.2	453,535	39.4	33.7	7.3	5.9	10.1	1.0	2.2	0.5	224,302	212,600	49.5	46.9	11,702
Source: SCB

==== Stockholm County ====
Location	Turnout	Share	Votes	S	M	C	FP	VPK	KDS	MP	Other	L-vote	R-vote	Left	Right	Margin
Location		%			%	%	%	%	%	%	%			%	%	
Botkyrka	90.7	5.9	31,511	49.0	26.2	8.1	5.3	7.9	1.3	1.9	0.4	17,919	12,495	56.9	38.7	5,424
Danderyd	95.0	3.5	18,995	18.0	61.0	7.9	7.1	3.0	0.7	2.1	0.1	3,987	14,435	21.0	76.0	10,448
Ekerö	93.9	1.8	9,848	30.2	39.9	13.5	7.2	5.1	0.8	3.2	0.1	3,475	5,960	35.3	60.5	2,485
Haninge	91.0	6.1	32,784	46.7	26.1	9.8	5.4	8.6	0.9	2.3	0.2	18,136	13,547	55.3	41.3	4,589
Huddinge	91.5	7.4	39,483	43.0	31.3	8.7	5.7	8.0	1.0	2.0	0.3	20,138	18,057	51.0	45.7	2,081
Järfälla	93.7	6.2	33,249	41.2	32.7	8.5	7.4	6.6	1.4	1.9	0.3	15,891	16,155	47.8	48.6	264
Lidingö	93.5	4.7	25,172	23.0	53.2	8.3	7.6	4.7	0.5	2.5	0.1	6,979	17,393	27.7	69.1	10,414
Nacka	92.7	6.6	35,392	35.5	39.7	7.7	6.2	7.3	0.7	2.3	0.5	15,158	18,980	42.8	53.6	3,822
Norrtälje	90.5	5.1	27,177	42.3	22.9	22.5	4.6	4.6	1.5	1.6	0.1	12,729	13,600	46.8	50.0	871
Nynäshamn	93.2	2.6	13,672	53.7	19.8	11.4	4.4	6.7	1.1	2.7	0.2	8,249	4,866	60.3	35.6	3,383
Salem	92.1	1.3	6,884	38.3	34.0	10.7	6.7	6.4	1.4	2.3	0.1	3,080	3,538	44.7	51.4	458
Sigtuna	91.1	3.0	16,259	43.4	29.6	13.3	5.1	5.8	1.1	1.6	0.2	7,988	7,797	49.1	48.0	191
Sollentuna	93.4	5.4	29,137	35.3	36.9	10.3	6.8	6.2	1.5	2.9	0.2	12,081	15,716	41.5	53.9	3,635
Solna	90.3	6.8	36,486	39.4	35.5	7.3	6.5	7.8	1.0	2.0	0.4	17,218	18,021	47.2	49.4	803
Sundbyberg	91.0	3.4	18,023	51.4	23.2	7.3	5.5	10.0	0.7	1.7	0.3	11,057	6,483	61.3	36.0	4,574
Södertälje	90.4	8.5	45,372	49.2	24.0	11.5	4.8	6.5	1.3	2.3	0.2	25,287	18,306	55.7	40.3	6,981
Tyresö	93.0	3.3	17,675	39.5	33.7	9.1	5.8	8.4	0.8	2.4	0.2	8,461	8,605	47.9	48.7	144
Täby	94.3	5.7	30,392	27.5	48.2	10.1	6.3	4.5	0.7	2.6	0.1	9,724	19,630	32.0	64.6	9,906
Upplands-Bro	92.8	2.0	10,683	46.8	27.5	10.1	5.0	6.5	1.8	2.1	0.3	5,694	4,549	53.3	42.6	1,145
Upplands-Väsby	92.0	3.3	17,596	44.6	29.5	9.8	5.6	7.2	1.2	1.9	0.3	9,123	7,898	51.8	44.9	1,225
Vallentuna	92.9	2.1	11,055	32.6	37.5	15.5	4.8	5.1	1.7	2.6	0.1	4,167	6,392	37.7	57.8	2,225
Vaxholm	91.9	0.7	3,931	36.2	37.0	9.9	7.2	6.2	0.6	2.9	0.1	1,666	2,126	42.4	54.1	460
Värmdö	92.2	2.0	10,587	44.0	31.2	10.3	4.5	6.8	1.0	2.0	0.2	5,379	4,874	50.8	46.0	505
Österåker	93.3	2.7	14,240	36.0	39.2	10.9	5.8	5.0	0.7	2.2	0.1	5,829	7,975	40.9	56.0	2,146
Total	92.1	9.6	535,603	39.9	33.8	10.2	5.9	6.6	1.1	2.2	0.4	249,415	267,398	46.6	49.9	17,983
Source: SCB

=== Södermanland ===
Location	Turnout	Share	Votes	S	M	C	FP	VPK	KDS	MP	Other	L-vote	R-vote	Left	Right	Margin
Location		%			%	%	%	%	%	%	%			%	%	
Eskilstuna	91.9	34.6	57,768	56.0	18.9	10.9	6.8	4.1	1.5	1.6	0.2	34,719	21,141	60.1	36.6	13,578
Flen	93.2	7.1	11,762	52.1	17.5	18.5	4.4	4.0	1.6	1.6	0.3	6,600	4,749	56.1	40.4	1,851
Katrineholm	92.8	13.2	22,002	54.7	16.9	15.2	5.6	3.4	2.3	1.7	0.1	12,783	8,296	58.1	37.7	4,487
Nyköping	92.8	26.2	43,665	49.1	22.0	16.7	4.8	3.0	1.6	1.8	0.1	23,149	18,948	53.0	43.4	4,201
Oxelösund	93.2	5.3	8,774	63.6	14.4	7.8	4.4	7.7	0.8	1.0	0.3	6,255	2,336	71.3	26.6	3,919
Strängnäs	92.5	9.7	16,146	44.3	26.3	14.5	7.4	4.1	1.5	1.8	0.1	7,816	7,783	48.4	48.2	33
Vingåker	93.5	4.0	6,620	51.0	14.2	20.2	6.8	3.3	2.7	1.8	0.1	3,594	2,723	54.3	41.1	871
Total	92.5	3.0	166,737	52.8	19.6	14.1	5.9	4.1	1.6	1.7	0.2	94,916	65,976	56.9	39.6	28,940
Source: SCB

=== Uppsala ===
Location	Turnout	Share	Votes	S	M	C	FP	VPK	KDS	MP	Other	L-vote	R-vote	Left	Right	Margin
Location		%			%	%	%	%	%	%	%			%	%	
Enköping	90.7	13.2	21,205	44.4	22.5	22.8	4.4	3.2	1.2	1.5	0.1	10,094	10,528	47.9	49.6	434
Håbo	93.4	4.6	7,369	43.0	32.8	12.8	4.5	4.5	1.0	1.3	0.1	3,503	3,687	47.5	50.0	184
Tierp	92.3	8.9	14,234	55.5	10.5	22.7	5.5	2.7	1.9	1.1	0.1	8,281	5,508	58.2	38.7	2,773
Uppsala	91.8	60.7	97,128	40.7	25.0	14.6	7.4	7.8	1.5	2.5	0.5	47,128	45,667	48.5	47.0	1,461
Älvkarleby	93.4	4.2	6,650	72.8	8.9	8.6	3.3	4.6	0.7	0.9	0.1	5,152	1,381	77.5	20.8	3,771
Östhammar	90.3	8.4	13,487	48.2	16.0	24.2	4.5	3.6	1.6	1.8	0.1	6,987	6,035	51.8	44.7	952
Total	91.7	2.9	160,073	44.6	22.3	16.9	6.3	6.1	1.5	2.0	0.3	81,145	72,806	50.7	45.5	8,339
Source: SCB

=== Värmland ===
Location	Turnout	Share	Votes	S	M	C	FP	VPK	KDS	MP	Other	L-vote	R-vote	Left	Right	Margin
Location		%			%	%	%	%	%	%	%			%	%	
Arvika	89.7	9.4	18,480	46.8	18.8	19.7	6.6	5.2	0.9	1.9	0.1	9,605	8,345	52.0	45.2	1,260
Eda	90.6	3.2	6,324	53.6	13.7	22.8	4.4	3.3	1.0	0.9	0.2	3,598	2,585	56.9	40.9	1,013
Filipstad	91.4	5.2	10,118	63.4	14.9	9.7	4.1	5.7	0.7	1.4	0.1	6,986	2,910	69.0	28.8	4,076
Forshaga	93.5	4.0	7,833	57.9	15.6	15.2	4.4	3.9	1.5	1.3	0.2	4,841	2,754	61.8	35.2	2,087
Grums	91.8	3.7	7,191	59.8	13.4	15.3	3.7	5.4	1.3	0.8	0.2	4,689	2,332	65.2	32.4	2,357
Hagfors	93.4	6.4	12,580	64.5	9.8	13.8	2.3	7.5	0.9	1.4	0.0	9,048	3,251	71.9	25.8	5,797
Hammarö	94.5	4.3	8,393	58.0	21.1	8.6	5.4	5.1	0.3	1.4	0.1	5,297	2,947	63.1	35.1	2,350
Karlstad	92.2	26.6	52,341	46.4	26.9	13.2	5.7	5.0	1.0	1.8	0.1	26,869	23,968	51.3	45.8	2,901
Kil	93.2	3.8	7,390	44.6	24.2	18.4	6.8	3.4	0.6	1.7	0.1	3,552	3,656	48.1	49.5	104
Kristinehamn	91.8	9.4	18,487	53.2	19.8	13.3	6.2	4.9	1.4	1.1	0.1	10,733	7,264	58.1	39.3	3,469
Munkfors	93.5	1.9	3,758	69.3	8.8	11.7	3.5	4.7	0.8	1.1	0.1	2,780	902	74.0	24.0	1,878
Storfors	93.1	1.9	3,721	60.5	15.3	13.7	4.1	4.5	0.9	0.9	0.2	2,419	1,231	65.0	33.1	1,188
Sunne	91.5	4.9	9,566	35.3	20.5	34.1	6.4	1.7	1.1	0.9	0.0	3,542	5,838	37.0	61.0	2,296
Säffle	90.6	6.6	12,882	42.8	20.9	25.6	5.0	3.0	1.7	1.0	0.0	5,902	6,637	45.8	51.5	735
Torsby	91.0	5.6	11,096	50.6	16.2	20.4	3.3	7.1	0.9	1.5	0.0	6,402	4,429	57.7	39.9	1,973
Årjäng	84.9	3.2	6,255	31.3	21.7	32.2	9.0	2.0	2.7	1.0	0.1	2,087	3,934	33.4	62.9	1,847
Total	91.6	3.5	196,415	50.4	20.0	17.0	5.3	4.8	1.1	1.4	0.1	108,350	82,983	55.2	42.2	25,367
Source: SCB

=== Västerbotten ===
Location	Turnout	Share	Votes	S	M	C	FP	VPK	KDS	MP	Other	L-vote	R-vote	Left	Right	Margin
Location		%			%	%	%	%	%	%	%			%	%	
Bjurholm	90.7	1.4	2,355	36.3	15.5	26.5	15.5	1.4	3.9	0.7	0.2	888	1,354	37.7	57.5	466
Dorotea	90.1	1.7	2,753	59.5	7.3	18.1	7.4	5.0	2.0	0.6	0.1	1,776	903	64.5	32.8	873
Lycksele	90.7	6.0	9,888	52.0	10.6	13.7	10.2	4.6	8.1	0.8	0.0	5,591	3,416	56.5	34.5	2,175
Malå	89.6	1.7	2,848	56.8	9.6	15.1	8.6	4.5	4.1	0.9	0.4	1,745	946	61.3	33.2	799
Nordmaling	92.7	3.4	5,629	46.7	12.1	26.3	7.1	2.8	4.2	0.6	0.0	2,788	2,566	49.5	45.6	222
Norsjö	88.0	2.3	3,795	49.8	8.9	21.0	10.5	4.9	3.5	0.6	0.8	2,075	1,533	54.7	40.4	542
Robertsfors	91.8	3.2	5,357	35.6	11.3	36.5	9.2	2.5	3.8	0.9	0.2	2,039	3,057	38.1	57.1	1,018
Skellefteå	90.9	30.5	50,472	54.1	11.3	18.6	6.8	4.5	3.6	0.9	0.2	29,588	18,498	58.6	36.7	11,090
Sorsele	85.0	1.6	2,568	44.0	10.1	22.5	9.9	3.9	8.1	0.9	0.6	1,230	1,091	47.9	42.5	139
Storuman	86.3	3.3	5,380	46.3	15.2	17.0	9.6	3.1	7.1	1.7	0.0	2,655	2,249	49.3	41.8	406
Umeå	91.9	33.1	54,680	45.8	15.8	17.4	7.3	8.4	2.8	2.0	0.6	29,623	22,114	54.2	40.4	7,509
Vilhelmina	88.9	3.6	5,912	56.2	8.0	16.8	7.6	4.8	5.6	1.0	0.0	3,609	1,911	61.0	32.3	1,698
Vindeln	90.7	3.0	4,908	40.2	14.8	25.5	11.9	2.5	4.3	0.8	0.0	2,094	2,561	42.7	52.2	467
Vännäs	91.1	3.3	5,496	47.8	11.9	25.6	5.5	4.7	3.5	0.8	0.2	2,885	2,365	52.5	43.0	520
Åsele	89.3	2.0	3,309	58.3	7.9	19.9	6.5	3.6	2.9	1.0	0.0	2,047	1,133	61.9	34.2	914
Total	90.9	3.0	165,350	49.3	12.7	19.2	7.8	5.5	3.9	1.2	0.3	90,633	65,697	54.8	39.7	24,936
Source: SCB

=== Västernorrland ===
Location	Turnout	Share	Votes	S	M	C	FP	VPK	KDS	MP	Other	L-vote	R-vote	Left	Right	Margin
Location		%			%	%	%	%	%	%	%			%	%	
Härnösand	92.2	10.5	19,465	44.6	16.9	26.2	3.2	5.2	1.5	2.3	0.2	9,695	8,999	49.8	46.2	696
Kramfors	93.3	10.3	19,176	55.6	8.8	23.3	1.9	6.9	1.9	1.1	0.5	11,980	6,518	62.5	34.0	5,462
Sollefteå	92.7	10.1	18,723	59.7	10.4	18.9	1.7	5.8	1.7	1.6	0.1	12,261	5,822	65.5	31.1	6,439
Sundsvall	91.7	34.8	64,827	52.8	15.0	17.9	4.9	5.8	1.8	1.5	0.3	38,000	24,482	58.6	37.8	13,518
Timrå	92.2	6.7	12,540	61.8	8.1	17.0	3.1	6.5	2.4	0.9	0.2	8,572	3,534	68.4	28.2	5,038
Ånge	90.0	5.0	9,359	56.8	8.5	23.4	2.5	5.9	1.8	1.1	0.0	5,864	3,215	62.7	34.4	2,649
Örnsköldsvik	92.9	22.6	42,091	52.6	11.0	23.7	4.6	3.1	3.8	1.0	0.2	23,439	16,528	55.7	39.3	6,911
Total	92.2	3.4	186,181	53.7	12.4	20.9	3.8	5.3	2.3	1.4	0.2	109,811	69,098	59.0	37.1	40,713
Source: SCB

=== Västmanland ===
Location	Turnout	Share	Votes	S	M	C	FP	VPK	KDS	MP	Other	L-vote	R-vote	Left	Right	Margin
Location		%			%	%	%	%	%	%	%			%	%	
Arboga	91.8	6.0	10,019	53.7	17.6	15.3	5.8	4.3	1.9	1.3	0.2	5,812	3,872	58.0	38.6	1,940
Fagersta	92.7	5.9	9,973	64.0	14.8	9.3	4.0	5.1	0.9	1.3	0.7	6,891	2,800	69.1	28.1	4,091
Hallstahammar	92.1	6.5	10,976	62.2	14.3	9.6	4.4	6.8	1.4	0.8	0.3	7,583	3,108	69.1	28.3	4,475
Heby	91.0	5.4	8,991	44.6	13.4	30.1	4.3	4.8	1.7	1.1	0.1	4,444	4,293	49.4	47.7	151
Kungsör	93.7	3.3	5,555	50.1	17.5	17.0	6.9	5.3	1.3	1.8	0.1	3,078	2,300	55.4	41.4	778
Köping	91.6	10.2	17,217	56.5	14.5	15.1	4.7	5.8	1.9	1.2	0.3	10,735	5,897	62.4	34.3	4,838
Norberg	91.2	2.7	4,491	62.5	11.9	11.3	3.2	8.5	1.2	1.2	0.3	3,192	1,181	71.1	26.3	2,011
Sala	91.2	8.5	14,226	41.6	19.2	25.2	6.1	4.1	1.9	1.8	0.2	6,495	7,190	45.7	50.5	695
Skinnskatteberg	92.4	2.0	3,357	62.3	10.6	14.6	2.6	6.7	1.1	1.8	0.2	2,318	933	69.0	27.8	1,385
Surahammar	93.9	4.1	6,913	68.1	11.0	8.4	4.0	6.2	1.3	0.9	0.1	5,137	1,621	74.3	23.4	3,516
Västerås	91.2	45.4	76,277	49.5	24.5	10.1	7.1	5.6	1.5	1.5	0.2	42,027	31,763	55.1	41.6	10,264
Total	91.6	3.0	167,995	52.6	19.4	13.4	5.9	5.5	1.5	1.4	0.2	97,712	64,958	58.2	38.7	32,754
Source: SCB

=== Västra Götaland ===
Västra Götaland did have three different counties at the time. Those were Göteborg och Bohuslän, Skaraborg and Älvsborg. There were five constituencies, namely two for Göteborg och Bohuslän, one for Skaraborg and two for Älvsborg.

==== Bohuslän ====
Location	Turnout	Share	Votes	S	M	C	FP	VPK	KDS	MP	Other	L-vote	R-vote	Left	Right	Margin
Location		%			%	%	%	%	%	%	%			%	%	
Härryda	93.0	7.9	14,702	37.2	28.8	14.6	10.0	5.5	1.2	2.3	0.4	6,277	7,858	42.7	53.4	1,581
Kungälv	92.9	10.6	19,865	39.1	26.5	17.3	8.8	4.4	1.8	1.9	0.1	8,633	10,460	43.5	52.7	1,827
Lysekil	91.5	5.5	10,178	54.3	18.9	11.2	8.7	3.9	1.6	1.4	0.1	5,919	3,946	58.2	38.8	1,973
Munkedal	90.3	3.8	7,167	39.6	18.3	30.1	6.1	2.5	1.6	1.7	0.1	3,017	3,909	42.1	54.5	892
Mölndal	92.2	17.0	31,684	41.4	26.5	11.2	9.3	7.3	1.9	2.1	0.3	15,418	14,890	48.7	47.0	528
Orust	89.6	4.4	8,165	34.2	24.4	25.9	9.4	3.1	1.5	1.4	0.1	3,048	4,871	37.3	59.7	1,823
Partille	92.6	9.7	18,134	37.9	31.0	9.5	11.4	6.9	1.6	1.6	0.1	8,119	9,405	44.8	51.9	1,286
Sotenäs	90.6	3.5	6,485	45.6	22.0	14.8	11.1	3.2	1.7	1.3	0.2	3,166	3,110	48.8	48.0	56
Stenungsund	91.2	5.5	10,226	39.4	27.5	17.9	8.1	4.0	1.2	1.8	0.1	4,435	5,472	43.4	53.5	1,037
Strömstad	88.0	3.4	6,375	43.9	19.7	22.3	8.1	2.3	1.8	1.9	0.1	2,943	3,196	46.2	50.1	253
Tanum	88.2	4.1	7,730	27.8	22.9	34.8	9.8	2.0	1.3	1.4	0.1	2,305	5,216	29.8	67.5	2,911
Tjörn	90.1	4.2	7,783	26.1	33.0	15.6	16.4	2.1	5.1	1.7	0.2	2,194	5,053	28.2	64.9	2,859
Uddevalla	91.4	17.0	31,810	48.4	20.3	17.1	6.6	4.2	1.5	1.5	0.4	16,724	14,002	52.6	44.0	2,722
Öckerö	91.0	3.4	6,359	28.0	34.3	11.4	13.4	2.7	7.9	2.1	0.3	1,949	3,761	30.6	59.1	1,812
Total	91.4	3.4	186,663	40.5	25.3	16.4	9.3	4.6	2.0	1.7	0.2	84,147	95,149	45.1	51.0	11,002
Source: SCB

==== Gothenburg ====
Location	Turnout	Share	Votes	S	M	C	FP	VPK	KDS	MP	Other	L-vote	R-vote	Left	Right	Margin
Location		%			%	%	%	%	%	%	%			%	%	
Gothenburg	90.1	100.0	285,891	40.8	27.5	7.7	9.7	10.0	1.4	2.0	0.9	145,363	128,390	50.8	44.9	16,973
Total	90.1	5.1	285,891	40.8	27.5	7.7	9.7	10.0	1.4	2.0	0.9	145,363	128,390	50.8	44.9	16,973
Source: SCB

==== Skaraborg ====
Location	Turnout	Share	Votes	S	M	C	FP	VPK	KDS	MP	Other	L-vote	R-vote	Left	Right	Margin
Location		%			%	%	%	%	%	%	%			%	%	
Essunga	92.3	2.2	4,061	23.7	30.4	34.0	7.0	2.0	1.9	0.7	0.2	1,044	2,904	25.7	71.5	1,860
Falköping	91.6	12.3	22,266	35.6	22.8	28.3	6.0	3.1	3.0	1.2	0.1	8,621	12,688	38.5	57.0	4,067
Grästorp	90.8	2.1	3,858	26.7	26.3	35.1	6.9	2.0	1.7	1.2	0.2	1,105	2,633	28.6	68.2	1,528
Gullspång	91.8	2.5	4,481	44.6	19.3	24.5	4.4	3.1	2.7	1.3	0.1	2,136	2,161	47.7	48.2	25
Götene	92.0	4.7	8,549	39.7	21.7	21.9	8.1	2.9	4.5	1.1	0.0	3,638	4,426	42.6	51.8	788
Habo	94.2	2.9	5,228	34.2	26.7	21.3	7.2	1.9	7.9	0.8	0.0	1,886	2,883	36.1	55.1	997
Hjo	91.6	3.2	5,862	39.4	25.4	20.3	6.4	3.0	4.2	1.1	0.1	2,486	3,058	42.4	52.2	572
Karlsborg	92.9	3.2	5,771	47.3	21.3	20.1	5.7	2.0	2.2	1.3	0.1	2,843	2,720	49.3	47.1	123
Lidköping	90.9	13.2	23,900	43.1	20.9	20.0	7.4	4.9	2.5	1.1	0.1	11,469	11,556	48.0	48.4	87
Mariestad	91.3	8.9	16,146	45.0	23.7	17.6	5.8	3.4	2.8	1.5	0.1	7,810	7,605	48.4	47.1	205
Mullsjö	93.0	2.3	4,106	34.1	23.7	21.5	6.1	2.5	10.3	1.6	0.1	1,504	2,109	36.6	51.4	605
Skara	91.6	6.7	12,170	39.7	24.6	21.5	6.8	3.7	2.0	1.4	0.4	5,276	6,429	43.4	52.8	1,153
Skövde	91.0	16.4	29,704	42.3	23.8	19.1	6.4	4.4	2.5	1.3	0.1	13,884	14,645	46.7	49.3	761
Tibro	91.7	4.1	7,333	43.6	19.0	21.3	7.8	3.5	3.9	0.8	0.1	3,454	3,524	47.1	48.1	70
Tidaholm	92.6	5.0	9,049	48.5	18.0	21.0	4.9	3.8	2.8	0.8	0.2	4,735	3,970	52.3	43.9	765
Töreboda	89.4	3.8	6,900	38.2	21.3	30.3	4.0	2.8	2.1	1.1	0.1	2,831	3,841	41.0	55.7	1,010
Vara	91.1	6.4	11,636	26.2	29.7	33.2	6.0	1.6	2.1	1.1	0.1	3,237	8,016	27.8	68.9	4,779
Total	91.5	3.3	181,020	39.6	23.2	23.0	6.4	3.4	3.0	1.2	0.1	77,959	95,168	43.1	52.6	17,209
Source: SCB

==== Älvsborg N ====
Location	Turnout	Share	Votes	S	M	C	FP	VPK	KDS	MP	Other	L-vote	R-vote	Left	Right	Margin
Location		%			%	%	%	%	%	%	%			%	%	
Ale	93.3	8.7	14,123	48.1	19.6	17.2	6.3	5.6	1.8	1.2	0.2	7,582	6,091	53.7	43.1	1,491
Alingsås	92.7	12.5	20,312	38.1	24.4	17.3	10.6	4.9	2.9	1.9	0.1	8,729	10,603	43.0	52.2	1,874
Bengtsfors	90.7	5.1	8,371	44.5	15.6	26.7	6.3	2.8	2.5	1.3	0.1	3,965	4,078	47.4	48.7	113
Dals-Ed	89.5	2.1	3,453	28.7	18.4	40.3	5.7	1.5	3.4	1.9	0.1	1,045	2,223	30.3	64.4	1,178
Färgelanda	92.3	3.1	4,977	36.9	18.0	37.4	4.0	1.8	0.9	0.9	0.0	1,930	2,953	38.8	59.3	1,023
Herrljunga	93.3	3.9	6,419	29.7	24.7	30.8	8.7	2.6	2.2	1.2	0.1	2,070	4,120	32.2	64.2	2,050
Lerum	94.2	11.6	18,849	32.9	33.2	13.6	10.4	5.3	2.1	2.4	0.1	7,195	10,788	38.2	57.2	3,593
Lilla Edet	91.4	4.5	7,335	51.2	16.5	19.6	5.1	4.6	1.3	1.6	0.1	4,092	3,021	55.8	41.2	1,071
Mellerud	91.3	4.6	7,425	33.5	21.4	34.1	5.1	1.8	2.6	1.5	0.0	2,620	4,498	35.3	60.6	1,878
Trollhättan	91.7	19.7	31,991	54.3	18.2	12.2	7.3	5.1	1.3	1.4	0.1	19,004	12,086	59.4	37.8	6,918
Vårgårda	92.6	3.8	6,182	26.4	24.5	29.8	11.0	2.4	4.3	1.6	0.1	1,786	4,032	28.9	65.2	2,246
Vänersborg	91.6	14.7	23,967	43.9	21.2	20.0	6.8	4.7	1.6	1.6	0.1	11,642	11,522	48.6	48.1	120
Åmål	89.8	5.7	9,277	48.5	21.2	19.3	5.3	2.4	2.2	1.0	0.1	4,721	4,248	50.9	45.8	473
Total	92.1	2.9	162,681	42.7	21.9	19.8	7.6	4.3	2.0	1.6	0.1	76,381	80,263	47.0	49.3	3,882
Source: SCB

==== Älvsborg S ====
Location	Turnout	Share	Votes	S	M	C	FP	VPK	KDS	MP	Other	L-vote	R-vote	Left	Right	Margin
Location		%			%	%	%	%	%	%	%			%	%	
Borås	92.5	56.7	68,204	44.9	26.8	14.3	6.0	4.6	1.8	1.4	0.1	33,809	32,117	49.6	47.1	1,692
Mark	93.5	17.7	21,340	45.4	20.5	23.0	3.9	4.0	1.7	1.4	0.1	10,539	10,127	49.4	47.5	412
Svenljunga	92.6	6.1	7,400	33.3	26.8	30.2	4.6	2.0	1.8	1.2	0.1	2,610	4,558	35.3	61.6	1,948
Tranemo	93.8	6.8	8,151	39.9	21.3	29.2	5.0	1.8	1.5	1.3	0.0	3,404	4,523	41.8	55.5	1,119
Ulricehamn	93.3	12.7	15,281	30.9	25.9	29.0	7.4	1.9	3.2	1.6	0.1	5,012	9,521	32.8	62.3	4,509
Total	92.9	2.2	120,376	42.2	25.2	19.7	5.6	3.8	1.9	1.4	0.1	55,374	60,846	46.0	50.5	5,472
Source: SCB

=== Örebro ===
Location	Turnout	Share	Votes	S	M	C	FP	VPK	KDS	MP	Other	L-vote	R-vote	Left	Right	Margin
Location		%			%	%	%	%	%	%	%			%	%	
Askersund	90.9	4.3	8,058	50.8	15.9	21.0	5.0	2.9	3.3	1.2	0.0	4,324	3,367	53.7	41.8	957
Degerfors	94.5	4.5	8,292	65.4	9.9	11.5	3.6	6.5	2.0	1.0	0.0	5,968	2,072	72.0	25.0	3,896
Hallsberg	92.3	6.2	11,539	54.3	13.5	17.4	5.5	4.8	3.5	1.1	0.0	6,811	4,198	59.0	36.4	2,613
Hällefors	91.4	3.8	7,023	65.9	9.3	10.4	3.2	8.3	1.7	1.1	0.1	5,212	1,608	74.2	22.9	3,604
Karlskoga	92.6	13.4	24,965	57.6	18.9	9.5	4.9	6.0	1.7	1.2	0.2	15,883	8,308	63.6	33.3	7,575
Kumla	91.9	6.5	12,038	52.1	15.4	16.1	5.7	5.2	4.1	1.3	0.1	6,895	4,480	57.3	37.2	2,415
Laxå	91.4	3.0	5,536	57.2	11.7	17.1	3.8	4.9	4.2	1.1	0.1	3,435	1,805	62.0	32.6	1,630
Lindesberg	91.4	9.0	16,740	50.7	15.5	20.7	4.4	4.2	2.7	1.7	0.1	9,191	6,800	54.9	40.6	2,391
Ljusnarsberg	90.4	2.5	4,723	60.4	10.4	14.7	3.3	7.4	2.2	1.5	0.1	3,201	1,340	67.8	28.4	1,861
Nora	91.1	3.6	6,683	53.0	15.6	16.8	6.0	4.4	2.2	2.1	0.0	3,836	2,560	57.4	38.3	1,276
Örebro	91.0	43.1	80,089	47.2	20.8	14.7	6.8	5.5	2.9	1.8	0.2	42,242	33,903	52.7	42.3	8,339
Total	91.5	3.3	185,686	52.2	17.4	14.9	5.6	5.4	2.8	1.5	0.2	106,998	70,441	57.6	37.9	36,557
Source: SCB

=== Östergötland ===
Location	Turnout	Share	Votes	S	M	C	FP	VPK	KDS	MP	Other	L-vote	R-vote	Left	Right	Margin
Location		%			%	%	%	%	%	%	%			%	%	
Boxholm	93.0	1.5	4,040	55.4	12.2	21.5	2.8	4.7	2.5	0.7	0.1	2,430	1,477	60.1	36.6	953
Finspång	93.4	6.1	16,121	59.2	14.9	13.2	4.2	4.3	2.8	1.4	0.1	10,228	5,207	63.4	32.3	5,021
Kinda	91.7	2.7	7,095	36.3	20.4	31.2	4.7	2.0	4.4	0.9	0.1	2,718	3,997	38.3	56.3	1,279
Linköping	92.5	29.7	78,687	43.6	26.8	13.1	6.1	5.7	2.8	1.6	0.3	38,800	36,188	49.3	46.0	2,612
Mjölby	92.1	6.5	17,359	49.8	19.7	18.6	4.3	3.9	2.4	1.1	0.2	9,325	7,389	53.7	42.6	1,936
Motala	92.0	10.5	27,735	55.2	17.7	13.8	5.7	4.3	2.1	1.1	0.1	16,496	10,310	59.5	37.2	6,186
Norrköping	90.8	29.7	78,812	50.6	25.1	11.3	4.6	5.0	1.9	1.4	0.1	43,880	32,280	55.7	41.0	11,600
Söderköping	92.1	2.9	7,749	36.6	25.3	27.2	4.4	3.0	2.0	1.5	0.0	3,066	4,413	39.6	56.9	1,347
Vadstena	93.2	2.0	5,312	46.3	22.0	18.7	6.9	2.4	2.4	1.4	0.0	2,587	2,526	48.7	47.6	61
Valdemarsvik	92.9	2.3	6,187	47.8	18.4	23.0	3.9	3.5	2.0	1.3	0.1	3,173	2,802	51.3	45.3	371
Ydre	93.3	1.2	3,089	28.2	19.6	34.4	9.3	1.7	5.2	1.3	0.1	926	1,957	30.0	63.4	1,031
Åtvidaberg	93.1	3.3	8,811	54.9	16.7	18.2	3.2	3.0	2.7	1.1	0.1	5,105	3,366	57.9	38.2	1,739
Ödeshög	92.0	1.6	4,150	41.2	19.7	27.4	4.0	2.5	4.0	1.1	0.0	1,814	2,122	43.7	51.1	308
Total	92.0	4.8	265,147	48.4	22.9	15.0	4.7	5.1	2.5	1.4	0.2	140,548	114,034	53.0	43.0	26,514
Source: SCB
