= Jonstorp =

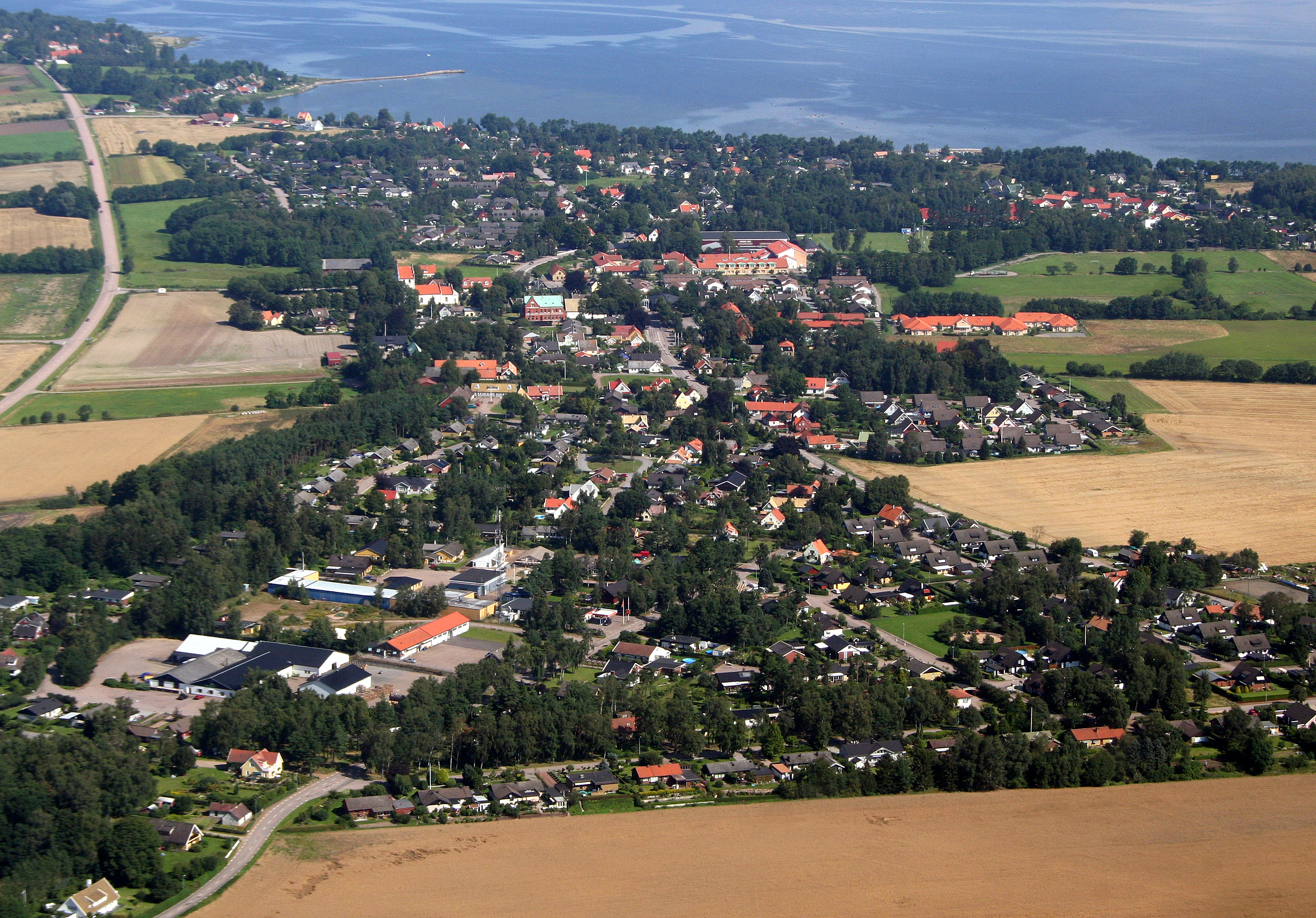
- August 2007 aerial view

- Location within Skåne Location within Sweden
- Coordinates: 56°14′N 12°40′E
- Country: Sweden
- Province: Skåne
- County: Skåne County
- Municipality: Höganäs Municipality

Area
  - Total: 1.47 km^{2} (0.57 sq mi)

Population (31 December 2010)
  - Total: 1,880
  - Density: 1,275/km^{2} (3,300/sq mi)
- Time zone: UTC+1 (CET)
  - Summer (DST): UTC+2 (CEST)

Jonstorp is a locality situated in Höganäs Municipality in northwestern Skåne County, Sweden. It had 1,880 inhabitants in 2010.

Jonstorp located at Skälder Bay beach. Tunneberga Inn serves traditional fare and is a popular destination for families as well as bus tours. On June 6 each year organizes Byalaget 'Jonstorp Day', a feast for both villagers and visitors. During the summer, attracts also visited Kulla market with fairground and traders. The market is held by tradition always the first weekend in July with Jonstorp IF as an arranger. The football team also organizes annually a large flea market on the first Sunday in September. In addition, the village has its own sports club with both contestants and senior squad gymnasts gymnastics and an ice hockey club which traditionally had great success at the junior side!

The actor Edvard Persson lived in Rekekroken outside Jonstorp from 1950 until his death and is buried in the cemetery Jonstorp.

Swedish Tourist Board operates a popular hostel, Hostel Jonstorp, Bläsinge 1:11 in the property which was formerly a home for deaf and blind.

In Skåne Business Archives in Helsingborg store archive documents from a number of older producers' cooperative societies in Jonstorp, including street lighting club, potato growers association and Jonstorp and Farhult electric cooperative.

== Tipifesten ==
Tipifesten was an annual cultural festival organized by Luna Music Association in Jonstorp, held during the summers of 1999–2008. The festival took place in a sheep pasture between Svanshall and Södåkra.

After the 2006 festival, local police applied rules for open, public events to Tipifesten, rather than those for closed, private events. Luna made the decision to stop holding the festival after 2008.
