= Mjöhult =

- Location within Skåne Location within Sweden
- Coordinates: 56°11′N 12°41′E
- Country: Sweden
- Province: Skåne
- County: Skåne County
- Municipality: Höganäs Municipality

Area
  - Total: 0.37 km^{2} (0.14 sq mi)

Population (31 December 2010)
  - Total: 292
  - Density: 793/km^{2} (2,050/sq mi)
- Time zone: UTC+1 (CET)
  - Summer (DST): UTC+2 (CEST)

Mjöhult is a locality situated in Höganäs Municipality, Skåne County, Sweden with 292 inhabitants in 2010.
