= Claus Zaar =

Swedish politician

Member of the Riksdag
- In office 1991–1994
- Constituency: Malmöhus County

Personal details
- Born: Claus Peter Sigvard Zaar Västerås, Sweden
- Party: Sweden Democrats
- Other political affiliations: New Democracy (1991–1994); Swedish Social Democrats (before 1991)

Claus Peter Sigvard Zaar is a Swedish businessman and politician who was a Member of the Riksdag for the now defunct New Democracy party until 1994.

Zaar was a founding member of New Democracy, which was generally perceived as right-wing party, alongside Bert Karlsson and Ian Wachtmeister. He had previously been active in the Swedish Social Democrats. He was elected to the Riksdag during the 1991 Swedish general election and served on the parliamentary agriculture and education committees. He was also a member of the New Democracy's executive board but lost his seat in the 1994 Swedish general election. In 2008, he became affiliated to the Sweden Democrats and helped to coordinate the SD's campaign during the 2010 Swedish general election. He is also a municipal councilor for the Sweden Democrats on the Öland island.
