= Per Olof Håkansson =

Swedish politician (1941–2000)

Per Olof Håkansson (11 May 1941 in Trelleborg – 29 August 2000 in Trelleborg) was a Swedish politician of the Swedish Social Democratic Party, who served as a member of the Swedish parliament, the Riksdag, from 1974 to 1998. He represented the constituency of Malmöhus County South. He served as President of the Nordic Council in 1994.
