= Stig Josefson =

Swedish politician

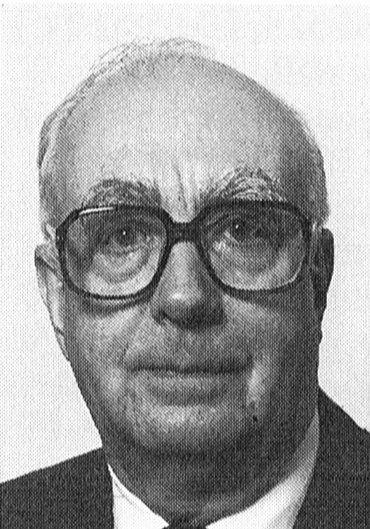

Stig Josefson (May 6, 1921 - December 14, 1996) was a Swedish politician. He was a member of the Centre Party.
