= Höganäs Municipality =

Höganäs Municipality Höganäs kommun
- Municipality
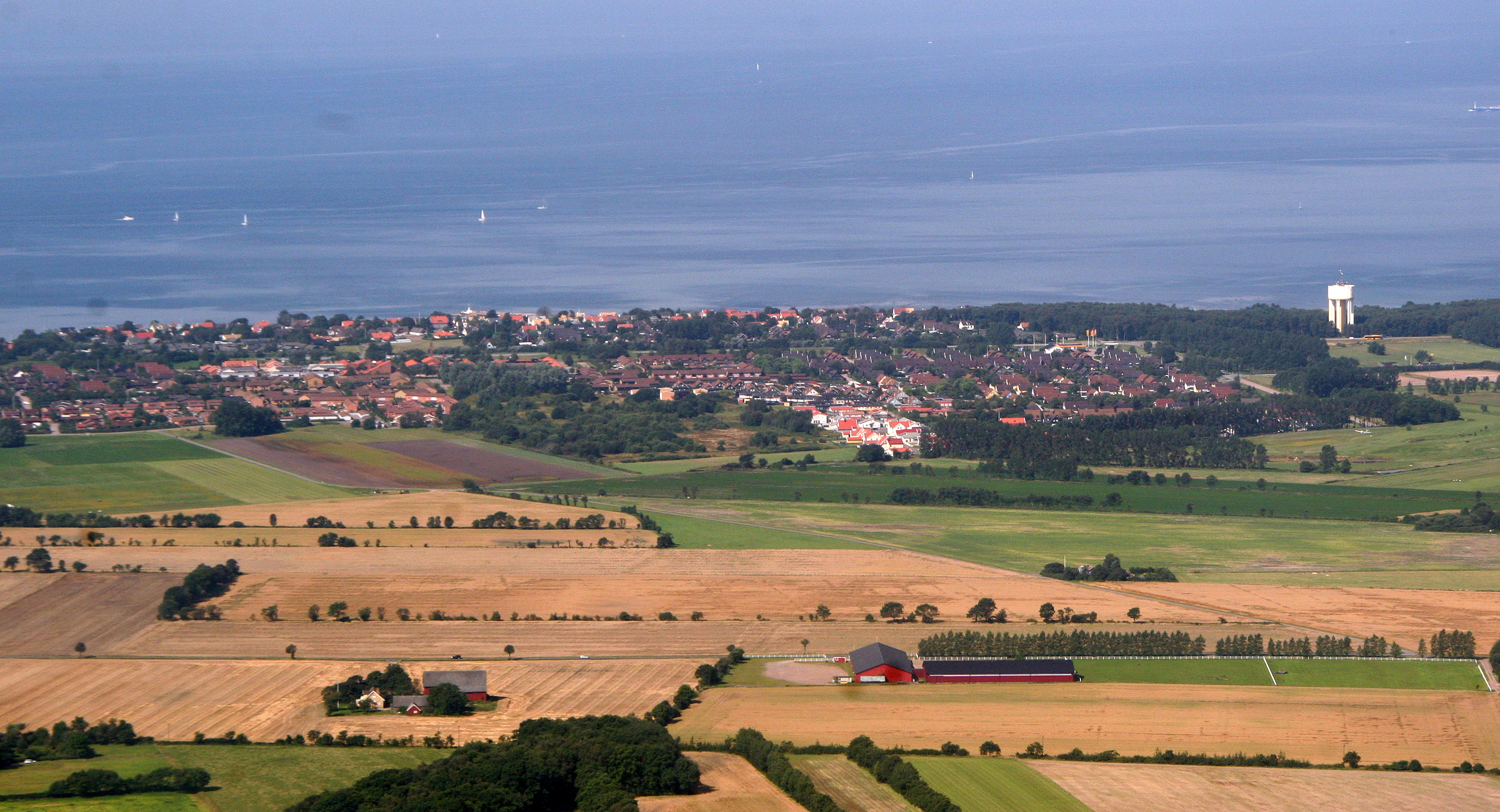

- Coat of arms

- Coordinates: 56°12′N 12°34′E
- Country: Sweden
- County: Skåne County
- Seat: Höganäs

Area
  - Total: 676.12 km^{2} (261.05 sq mi)
  - Land: 150.84 km^{2} (58.24 sq mi)
  - Water: 525.28 km^{2} (202.81 sq mi)
- Area as of 1 January 2014.

Population (30 June 2025)
  - Total: 28,598
  - Density: 189.59/km^{2} (491.04/sq mi)
- Time zone: UTC+1 (CET)
  - Summer (DST): UTC+2 (CEST)
- ISO 3166 code: SE
- Province: Scania
- Municipal code: 1284
- Website: www.hoganas.se

Höganäs Municipality (Swedish: Höganäs kommun) is one of 290 municipalities of Sweden, in Skåne County in the southern part of the country. Its seat is located in the city of Höganäs.

The rural municipality Höganäs, in which the first municipalsamhälle (a kind of borough managing matters of urban character) of Sweden had been established in 1875, received the title of a city in 1936. In 1967 it was merged with Väsby. The present municipality was created with the reform in 1971 when the city was amalgamated with Brunnby and Jonstorp.

== Geography ==
The municipality is located on the Kullen peninsula, the extreme part of which is known as the nature reserve Kullaberg hill, with the picturesque villages of Mölle and Arild. The nature reserve is an Important Bird Area of Sweden and a location of several rare plant species.

The Kullen Lighthouse, the most powerful lighthouse in Scandinavia, is located on the western point of Kullaberg. The nature reserve is also home to a series of wooden structures along the coastline, which were begun by artist by Lars Vilks in 1980, and which have become known as Nimis. This is a tourist attraction despite being unauthorised by the Swedish authorities and therefore not marked on maps or signposted.

=== Localities ===
There were eight localities in the municipality as of 2018. The municipal seat is marked in bold.

| Urban area | Population |
|---|---|
| **Höganäs** | 15,444 |
| Viken (part of) | 4,575 |
| Jonstorp | 2,044 |
| Arild | 715 |
| Mölle | 601 |
| Mjöhult | 327 |
| Farhult | 315 |
| Ingelsträde | 250 |

== Demographics ==
This is a demographic table based on Höganäs Municipality's electoral districts in the 2022 Swedish general election sourced from SVT's election platform, in turn taken from SCB official statistics.

In total there were 27,560 residents, including 21,308 Swedish citizens of voting age. 38.5% voted for the left coalition and 60.3% for the right coalition. Indicators are in percentage points except population totals and income.

| Location | Residents | Citizen adults | Left vote | Right vote | Employed | Swedish parents | Foreign heritage | Income SEK | Degree |
| Location | | | % | % | | | | | |
|---|---|---|---|---|---|---|---|---|---|
| Höganäs C | 1,993 | 1,732 | 46.5 | 52.5 | 77 | 82 | 18 | 24,076 | 44 |
| Höganäs NV | 2,046 | 1,582 | 42.0 | 55.9 | 80 | 84 | 16 | 25,876 | 41 |
| Höganäs NÖ | 1,993 | 1,448 | 42.8 | 56.2 | 80 | 77 | 23 | 22,806 | 31 |
| Höganäs S | 1,732 | 1,170 | 46.5 | 52.3 | 72 | 65 | 35 | 22,595 | 39 |
| Höganäs SÖ | 1,906 | 1,401 | 49.5 | 49.2 | 76 | 75 | 25 | 22,551 | 38 |
| Höganäs Ö | 1,946 | 1,349 | 41.0 | 57.8 | 76 | 69 | 31 | 23,442 | 32 |
| Jonstorp V | 2,330 | 1,744 | 33.3 | 65.5 | 83 | 87 | 13 | 28,441 | 47 |
| Jonstorp Ö | 2,149 | 1,692 | 34.4 | 64.6 | 84 | 88 | 12 | 27,594 | 47 |
| Lerberget N | 1,665 | 1,226 | 36.3 | 63.1 | 89 | 89 | 11 | 31,827 | 56 |
| Lerberget S | 1,165 | 841 | 35.9 | 63.3 | 84 | 87 | 13 | 29,738 | 50 |
| Nyhamn V | 1,828 | 1,549 | 42.4 | 56.8 | 80 | 87 | 13 | 27,052 | 60 |
| Nyhamn Ö | 1,829 | 1,497 | 41.7 | 57.3 | 82 | 86 | 14 | 28,844 | 55 |
| Viken N | 1,459 | 1,142 | 31.2 | 67.9 | 83 | 90 | 10 | 33,061 | 61 |
| Viken S | 1,226 | 1,206 | 25.8 | 73.2 | 72 | 89 | 11 | 30,034 | 64 |
| Viken Ö | 2,293 | 1,729 | 29.7 | 68.7 | 85 | 87 | 13 | 30,704 | 56 |
Source: SVT

== Elections ==
Below are the results since the 1973 municipal reform listed. Between 1988 and 1998 the Sweden Democrats' results were not published by the SCB due to the party's small size nationwide. "Turnout" denotes the percentage of the electorate casting a ballot, but "Votes" only applies to valid ballots cast.

=== Riksdag ===
| Year | Turnout | Votes | V | S | MP | C | L | KD | M | SD | ND |
|---|---|---|---|---|---|---|---|---|---|---|---|
| 1973 | 93.2 | 13,028 | 1.3 | 43.0 | 0.0 | 23.5 | 7.9 | 1.1 | 22.9 | 0.0 | 0.0 |
| 1976 | 94.6 | 14,366 | 1.4 | 39.4 | 0.0 | 21.3 | 11.1 | 1.0 | 25.7 | 0.0 | 0.0 |
| 1979 | 93.0 | 14,667 | 1.8 | 38.7 | 0.0 | 14.5 | 10.3 | 1.0 | 32.9 | 0.0 | 0.0 |
| 1982 | 93.8 | 15,027 | 1.9 | 39.2 | 2.0 | 11.9 | 5.8 | 1.3 | 37.8 | 0.0 | 0.0 |
| 1985 | 91.7 | 14,966 | 2.0 | 37.4 | 1.8 | 9.4 | 15.8 | 0.0 | 33.4 | 0.0 | 0.0 |
| 1988 | 87.6 | 14,446 | 2.6 | 36.7 | 6.9 | 8.6 | 12.7 | 2.5 | 29.6 | 0.0 | 0.0 |
| 1991 | 88.3 | 14,950 | 2.2 | 31.1 | 3.1 | 5.9 | 8.7 | 8.5 | 31.7 | 0.0 | 6.6 |
| 1994 | 88.3 | 15,083 | 3.0 | 38.7 | 4.6 | 6.3 | 7.4 | 4.2 | 33.8 | 0.0 | 1.3 |
| 1998 | 83.5 | 14,295 | 6.4 | 30.5 | 3.3 | 3.0 | 5.7 | 13.8 | 33.4 | 0.0 | 0.0 |
| 2002 | 82.3 | 14,277 | 4.7 | 32.7 | 3.5 | 3.9 | 16.1 | 11.5 | 22.8 | 2.7 | 0.0 |
| 2006 | 83.7 | 15,114 | 2.5 | 27.2 | 4.0 | 5.8 | 8.4 | 7.8 | 37.3 | 4.2 | 0.0 |
| 2010 | 85.9 | 16,110 | 2.6 | 20.2 | 5.9 | 5.4 | 9.1 | 6.7 | 42.4 | 6.4 | 0.0 |
| 2014 | 87.7 | 16,846 | 3.0 | 22.0 | 6.3 | 5.3 | 6.4 | 5.4 | 33.9 | 14.8 | 0.0 |

Blocs

This lists the relative strength of the socialist and centre-right blocs since 1973, but parties not elected to the Riksdag are inserted as "other", including the Sweden Democrats results from 1988 to 2006, but also the Christian Democrats pre-1991 and the Greens in 1982, 1985 and 1991. The sources are identical to the table above. The coalition or government mandate marked in bold formed the government after the election. New Democracy got elected in 1991 but are still listed as "other" due to the short lifespan of the party. "Elected" is the total number of percentage points from the municipality that went to parties who were elected to the Riksdag.

| Year | Turnout | Votes | Left | Right | SD | Other | Elected |
|---|---|---|---|---|---|---|---|
| 1973 | 93.2 | 13,028 | **44.3** | 54.3 | 0.0 | 1.4 | 98.6 |
| 1976 | 94.6 | 14,366 | 40.8 | **58.1** | 0.0 | 1.1 | 98.9 |
| 1979 | 93.0 | 14,667 | 40.5 | **57.7** | 0.0 | 1.8 | 98.2 |
| 1982 | 93.8 | 15,027 | **41.1** | 55.5 | 0.0 | 3.4 | 96.6 |
| 1985 | 91.7 | 14,966 | **39.4** | 58.6 | 0.0 | 2.0 | 98.0 |
| 1988 | 87.6 | 14,446 | **46.2** | 50.9 | 0.0 | 2.9 | 97.1 |
| 1991 | 88.3 | 14,950 | 33.3 | **54.8** | 0.0 | 11.9 | 94.7 |
| 1994 | 88.3 | 15,083 | **46.3** | 51.7 | 0.0 | 2.0 | 98.0 |
| 1998 | 83.5 | 14,295 | **40.2** | 55.9 | 0.0 | 3.9 | 96.1 |
| 2002 | 82.3 | 14,277 | **40.9** | 54.3 | 0.0 | 4.7 | 95.3 |
| 2006 | 83.7 | 15,114 | 33.7 | **59.3** | 0.0 | 7.0 | 93.0 |
| 2010 | 85.9 | 16,110 | 28.7 | **63.6** | 6.4 | 1.3 | 98.7 |
| 2014 | 87.7 | 16,846 | **31.3** | 50.0 | 14.8 | 3.9 | 96.1 |
