= Violence against women in Uganda =

Issue that negatively affects various aspects of women's lives

Violence against women in Uganda is an issue that negatively affects various aspects of women's lives. COVID-19 has worsened the current condition for women facing domestic violence. Perceived changing social standards and cultural norms indicate power dynamics which is a primary cause of violence carried out against women. Refugee women in Uganda are uniquely subjugated as they have the least access to gaining social or monetary capital. However, there has been recent legislation aimed at improving the quality of life for Ugandan women and refugee women in Uganda.

== Background ==
The United Nations has defined violence against women as "any act of gender-based violence that results in, or is likely to result in, physical, sexual, or mental harm to women." Domestic violence, similar to intimate partner violence (IPV) and sex and gender based violence (SGBV), falls under the umbrella term "violence against women" (VAW). Each of these acts has been deemed a human rights violation and detrimental to public health. These issues are rooted in gender inequalities. Such acts of violence can consist of sexual coercion (including rape), physical beatings, verbal and emotional abuse, and emotional manipulation.

== Statistics ==
Sub-Saharan Africa has the highest reported rates of IPV according to a World Health Organization Report in 2013. In Uganda, the prevalence of violence against women and, more specifically, domestic violence is significant. According to the UN Women Global Database on VAW, 50% of women aged 15–49 have or will experience IPV or SGBV at least once in their lifetime. In 2018, 30% of women aged 15–49 had experienced IPV or SGBV in the last 12 months. In 2011, the Demographic and Health Survey recorded that nearly one out of three women in rural Uganda had been physically violated (punched, kicked, dragged, burnt, strangled, or threatened with weapons). These numbers place Uganda in the top percentile of countries with instances of VAW.

== Implications ==
The consequences of IPV, SGBV, and VAW, in general, are numerous. Women who have experienced acts of violence are subject to being ostracized by society. Women's political power is severely restricted due to strict customary and statutory laws (this is the case across Sub-Saharan Africa). Women who are victims of assault are often considered unworthy of either getting married or remaining in their marriages. Children born of rape and their mothers may be rejected by their families and society at-large. Refugee women are especially at risk of violence in Uganda. Uganda shares a border with South Sudan; due to the conflict in South Sudan, many individuals have had to flee to Uganda. Uganda has the highest refugee population in Africa; 1.45 million refugees make up 3% of Uganda's entire population. Uganda's immigration and refugee policies are considered to be fairly open compared to other countries both in Sub-Saharan Africa as well as the West and the government has taken steps to allowing for greater freedoms and mobilization for refugees. However, due to insufficient resources (both economically and in infrastructure), female refugees are unable to effectively assimilate into Ugandan society. In a study of South Sudanese female refugees, 100% ages 18 and older reported having experienced SGBV at least once.

=== Impact of COVID-19 ===
Due to the novel COVID-19, women in Uganda are often confined to their homes where they are more exposed to violence perpetuated against them by their partners, with no social networks to rely on. 46% of Ugandan women reported that they had experienced physical violence as a result of the country-wide lockdown. In addition, the lockdown prevented women from leaving their homes to go to their jobs, run their businesses, attend social gatherings, etc. As a result, women were forced to spend more time in their homes with their abusers.

== Changing policy and perception ==
There have been steps made towards improving conditions for women in Uganda. First, the Succession Bill was updated to allow women to own land and property as well as keep claims to their inheritances. This allows women to become more financially dependent and able to leave abusive households. Second, the Employment Bill was passed which required employers to implement workplace policies against abuse, harassment, and violence. This legislation also protects unpaid domestic workers and refugees searching for employment from being exploited.

It is also necessary for public perception and tolerance of VAW to change. Violence against women in Uganda often occurs as a means to reinforcing gender norms and expectations. For example, women who fail to properly execute household tasks are often subject to abuse from their partners and other male family members. In response, women are advised to remain non-confrontational about this treatment. There is a strong correlation between socioeconomic status and domestic violence; in other words, women who possess lower wealth and/or are less educated are more likely to be victims of domestic violence. An especially important social factor is the bride-price. Bride-prices are symbolic of a woman's worth and men who do not pay high bride-prices are considered less able to sustain a marital relationship. The inherent outcome of placing a price on women is the commodification of their bodies, leading to violence. To that end, modernization (changing economic and social conditions) combined with increasing women's participation in the labor force creates uncertainty and threatens existing gender structures. The transition from traditional patriarchy to modern society leads to violence. VAW and, more specifically, sexual violence, further harms women's reproductive health. Women who are victims of sexual coercion may be unable to make conscious and deliberate use of contraceptives. Uganda has an exceptionally low contraceptive rate at 23% and induced abortions make up 15-30% of maternal deaths. Thus, broad perceptions of women's role in society are the root cause of VAW.
