= Impact of the COVID-19 pandemic on crime =

Consequences of COVID-19 pandemic for crime

The COVID-19 pandemic has impacted crime and illicit economies such as organised crime, terrorism, street crime, online crime, illegal markets and smuggling, human and wildlife trafficking, slavery, robberies and burglaries.

The Global Initiative Against Transnational Organized Crime has stated in a policy brief in March 2020 that while understanding the long-term impact at these early stages of the pandemic is difficult, some things are clear: the pandemic has caused a decrease in some organized criminal activities, while providing new opportunities in other areas, causing a change in the "organized-criminal economy" that may be long term. The report states that some criminal organisations could take advantage of the situation by expanding activities, with a possibility of "the emergence of criminal groups as suppliers and 'partners' of the state in maintaining order".

Consistent with these findings, researchers have found that the COVID19 lockdowns have also reduced violence by terrorists and other armed groups, which often fund their activities through illicit activities.

== Crime ==
COVID-19 caused a reduction in many types of crime around the world. A report by USA Today on 4 April 2020 showed a decrease in criminal incidents (in America) since 15 March in nineteen out of twenty police agencies examined. However, the report also noted an increase in domestic violence. Some police departments are intentionally arresting fewer people to prevent potential spread of coronavirus in jails; tackling the issues in alternative ways rather than making "physical arrests". Associated Press reported that in Chicago drug arrests fell 42% since the lockdowns, compared with the same period in 2019. Overall, crime in Chicago declined 10% following the outbreak of the pandemic. This decrease is being seen across cities globally as restrictions were increased to contain the virus.

A detailed examination for one UK police force found variation in the onset of change by crime type when compared to 5-year averages. Some types of crime declined immediately from ‘global pandemic’ announcement from the World Health Organization on 11 March 2020, others later. Incidence of assault was inelastic but responsive to reduced workplace mobility.

Following an increase in movement restrictions across nations, there are fewer people on the streets, causing a decrease in street crime. And with a larger population staying indoors at home, thefts and residential burglaries have decreased. In Colombia and El Salvador, following the lockdowns, many types of crime saw a decrease. In Peru, crime levels fell 84% in March. Alleged Serbian drug lord Dragoslav Kosmajac died of COVID-19. Karachi, one of "Asia's most crime-ridden cities", saw an entire week in March go by without any car thefts. In New York City, grand larceny declined by over 50% in April compared to the same period last year; however, the city saw a rise in commercial burglaries despite the overall fall of ~29% in major crimes. In Mexico, amid the pandemic, some criminal groups were seen handing out food supplies, while in other places in Mexico some criminals were facing unemployment. In Australia, border police found methamphetamine (crystal meth/ ice) being smuggled into the country in hand sanitizer bottles.

=== Counterfeiting and fraud ===
Counterfeiting and fraud directly related to the COVID-19 pandemic has also been uncovered. In the beginning of March 2020, over 34,000 counterfeit surgical masks were seized by law enforcement authorities worldwide as part of Operation Pangea, supported by Interpol and Europol. Police in India seized thousands of fake N95 masks, raided shops selling overpriced masks and sanitizers, and initiated a case against hoarders of personal protective equipment (PPE). In the United States, individuals were arrested after impersonating doctors and demanding payments for treatment.

Operation Stolen Promise was enacted with aid from the U.S. Customs and Border Protection, the Food and Drug Administration, the US Postal Inspection Service, the US Secret Service, the Internal Revenue Service, the Federal Bureau of Investigation, and the Five Eyes Law Enforcement Working Group, an intelligence coalition formed by Australia, Canada, New Zealand, the United Kingdom, and the United States. The operation investigated and seized shipments of "mislabeled, fraudulent, unauthorized, or prohibited" COVID-19-related items.

In the United States, the vast increase in the flow of federal funds to American citizens (via the CARES Act and related measures) resulted in a corresponding increase in benefits fraud, both from businesses and individuals. In the largest individual case, Feeding Our Future, dozens of individuals conspired to receive nearly $250 million in USDA child nutrition funds while failing to actually provide meals to children. Nationwide, as of 2025, more than 4200 Americans had been federally charged with pandemic fraud, leading to more than 2400 convictions and $2 billion in recovered funds and forfeitures.

=== Cybercrime ===
With more people staying at home and spending more time online, cyber crime has increased. With remote work increasing, more and more corporate data is being accessed from homes that may not have the same level of computer security as office systems. The World Health Organization published a cyber security notice warning people of fraudsters imitating WHO employees.

Another cyber fraud in America resulted in money that was meant for the unemployed being redirected to fraudulent accounts. The scale of it involves millions of dollars and it appears that the cyber-criminals are Nigerian.

According to government data, as of February 2021, one in three workers in the UK were engaging in remote work due to the COVID-19 lockdowns, which has resulted in an increase in the cyber-attacks on employees. The lack of knowledge about cyber-attacks and cyber-security has been claimed as a prime reason behind rising cyber-crime in the UK during the COVID-19 pandemic.

=== Organized crime ===
Restrictions imposed during the pandemic hampered the ability of governments, law enforcement and international agencies to counter the activities of organized crime groups. This was especially apparent in areas such as the Mekong Region, which saw a rapid expansion of organized crime groups involved in illegal online gambling, cyber-enabled fraud, drug trafficking, and money laundering. Pandemic border restrictions limited the ability of organized crime groups based in the Golden Triangle area to export narcotics, leading to an abundance of methamphetamine and increased drug use within the region.

=== Domestic violence ===
Amid the reported global increase in domestic violence during the COVID-19 pandemic, the United Nations called for a domestic violence "ceasefire".

In Peru, the number of women reported missing has surged from five per day from before COVID-19 to eight during the lock-downs. In total, 915 women in Peru were reported missing and feared dead during the three months quarantine.

=== Hate crimes ===
An intelligence report compiled by the FBI's Houston branch warned against the likely increase of hate crime incidents against Asian Americans, based on the assumption that a portion of the US public associate the pandemic with China and Asian American populations. They also referenced multiple incidents of hate crimes already perpetrated across the country such as three Asian American family members stabbed by an individual who claimed that the family was Chinese and spreading the virus.

=== Terrorist attacks ===
In its magazine Al-Naba, ISIL recommended that its members exploit the pandemic in order to carry out terrorist attacks. Some extremists regard the virus as being divine punishment for human sins, both in the West and in Muslim countries. The International Crisis Group said that the pandemic would harm international counterterrorism efforts. However, academic research suggests that this has not borne out. Brancati, et al. find that lockdowns associated with the pandemic lead to decreased violence by ISIL.

In April in India, an advisory was circulated among Delhi police staff of a potential ISIL attack on police personnel in the field, in the form of a lone wolf attack or "stabbing, firing or hitting by vehicles". Between January and May 2020, Indian security forces conducted 27 counterterrorism operations in Jammu and Kashmir in which more than 64 terrorists were killed. Out of these, at least 18 were killed during the COVID-19 lockdown in India. In the first week of May, five Indian Army special forces para commandos were killed by terrorists. Riyaz Naikoo, a commander of the terrorist organization Hizb-ul-Mujahideen, in his last audio message in April 2020, told his followers to follow health safety guidelines that health experts were sharing during the COVID-19 pandemic. He was killed shortly after.

Also in May a series of attacks in Afghanistan resulted in the deaths of 56 people. The targets included a hospital's maternity ward and a funeral, resulting in the deaths of babies, hospital staff, and people at the funeral.

=== Use of COVID-19 as a weapon ===
A railway worker from London contracted COVID-19 and died after a man assaulted her and a coworker. The man said he had the virus and proceeded to spit and cough in the women's faces before running away. Police responding to a domestic incident in Durham, England, were spat on by a teenager who shouted at officers that he hoped he had COVID-19; he was charged with assaulting an emergency worker. Between April 1 and June 6, 2020, the Irish police were purposefully spat or coughed on by individuals on 93 occasions, causing the department to increase their use of spit hoods by 70%. On April 24, 2021, Spanish police arrested a man suspected of infecting 22 people, eight directly and 14 indirectly, with the virus, saying he made no efforts to quarantine himself or wear a facemask despite showing symptoms and having done a test.

In the United States, multiple police departments documented individuals coughing or spitting on responding officers and saying that they had COVID-19. Charges that could be filed against these individuals range from second-degree assault or terrorist threatening. A New Jersey woman spat on a police officer and told responding officers that she was positive for COVID-19 while they were arresting her. Similar cases were reported in Florida, Colorado, Michigan, Ohio, and other states. (Note: While there are multiple incidents for some states, only one will be linked per state.)

In India, the Tablighi Jamaat religious event hosted by an Islamic missionary group became the country's largest super-spreader, resulting in various type of criminal charges being filed against the attendees for not heeding lockdown restrictions. More than 800 foreigners who attended the event were tracked down and their visas blacklisted. Indian media reported that those who were quarantined by the government spat on healthcare personnel among other things, resulting in numerous charges under the Indian Penal Code. The Chief Minister of Uttar Pradesh, in a television interview, said that "to hide a disease which is infectious is definitely a crime. And this crime has been done by those associated with the Tablighi Jamaat". The National Security Act and murder charges were filed against some of the Tablighi Jamaat attendees.

== Policing ==
In New Delhi, India, new guidelines were circulated among the police with relation to policing during the COVID-19 pandemic. The 11-page order included guidelines such as "maintaining six feet distance from the victim at a crime spot" and "sanitizing weapons". Israel allowed its domestic security agency to secretly collect cellphone data to track carriers of coronavirus. The same technology was being used for counterterrorism and had not been disclosed publicly before its implementation for COVID-19.

In Italy and Spain, there has been a redeployment of carabinieri and military troops, respectively. The pandemic has also impacted the criminal justice system. In the United Kingdom, as part of contingency plans, murder investigations may be limited due to the additional workload the pandemic has created. Brazil has put anti-slavery enforcement operations on indefinite hold.

The pandemic has added to the workload of various police agencies. Acknowledging the increased workload, Polish police lightheartedly wrote in a tweet on 19 March, "Please stop all criminal activities until further notice", a message that was directed at criminals, adding, "we will appreciate the expected cooperation related to refraining from committing crimes". In the Indian state of Bihar, an additional director general of police admitted that the police were more focused on enforcing the lockdown, but that policing was also being done, thereby increasing their workload significantly.

The pandemic caused a disruption to various transnational operations such as a long-planned joint operation by six countries (Cambodia, China, Laos, Myanmar, Thailand, and Vietnam) and the United Nations Office on Drugs and Crime against organized crime and drug traffickers in the region. A reduction in legal cross-border traffic and restrictions on international air traffic made long-distance smuggling more difficult.

There has also been impact based on the potential for law enforcement officials to make contact with individuals confirmed or suspected to have COVID-19, although the U.S. Centers for Disease Control and Prevention (CDC) considers the immediate health risk to be low. In the case of contact with an individual with COVID-19, CDC recommends that law enforcement officials follow the same guidelines as emergency medical technicians.

== Judicial systems ==
The Crown Prosecution Service of United Kingdom has advised out of court disposals for less serious crimes. In the United States, the Sixth Amendment's right to counsel has been reduced because of the pandemic situation.

Governments in Iran and Afghanistan have reduced the number of prisoners to limit the spread of the virus. The Supreme Court of India directed all Indian state governments to consider releasing some prisoners, resulting in as many as 34,000 being temporarily released. The United States and Indonesia also released prisoners.

== See also ==
- 2020 Nova Scotia attacks
- Impact of the COVID-19 pandemic on crime in the Republic of Ireland
