= COVID-19 lockdowns =

Restrictions imposed during the COVID-19 pandemic

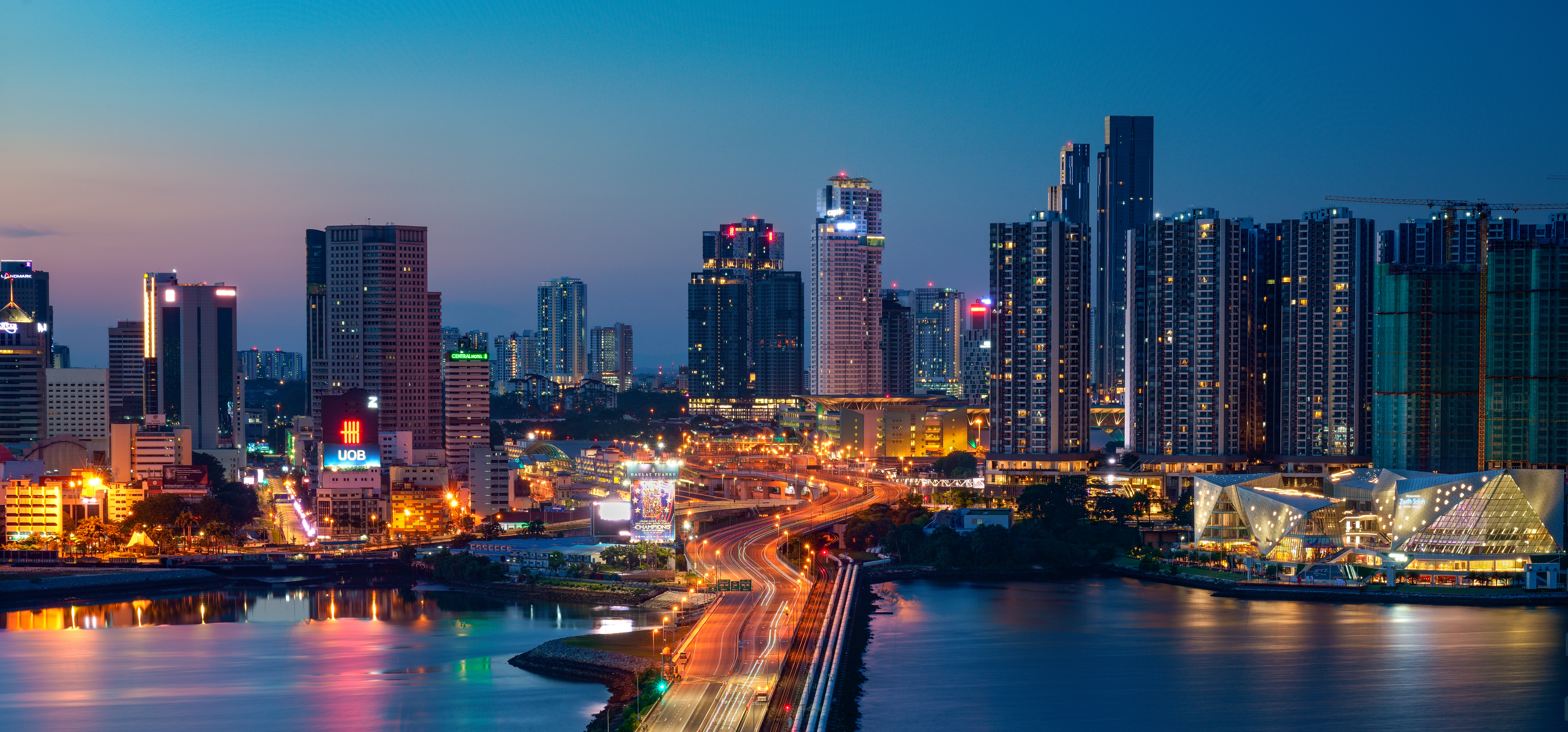
The world's busiest international land crossing between Johor Bahru, Malaysia and Singapore, became empty during the lockdowns.

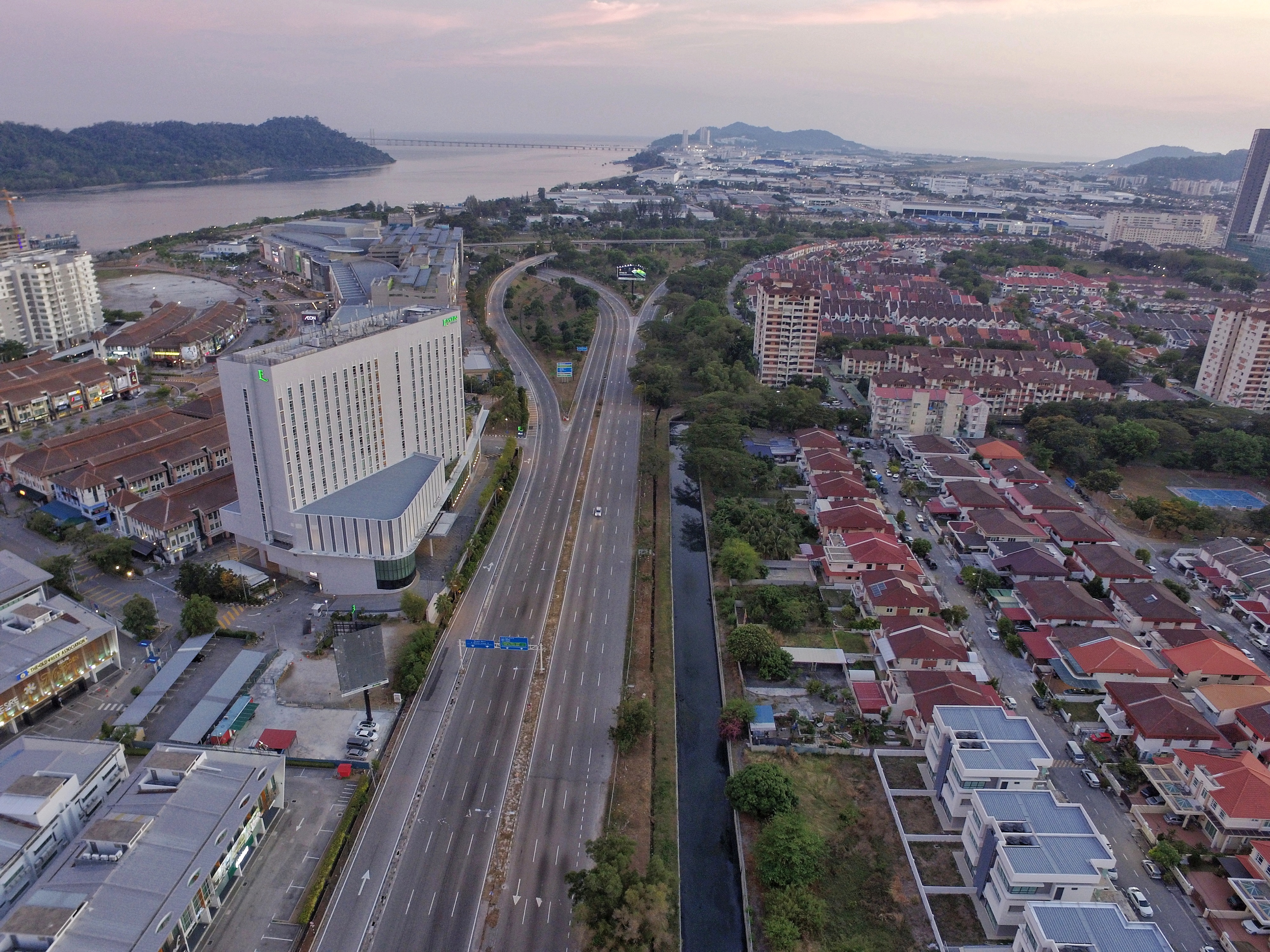
A usually congested highway in Penang, Malaysia, deserted during the Movement Control Order

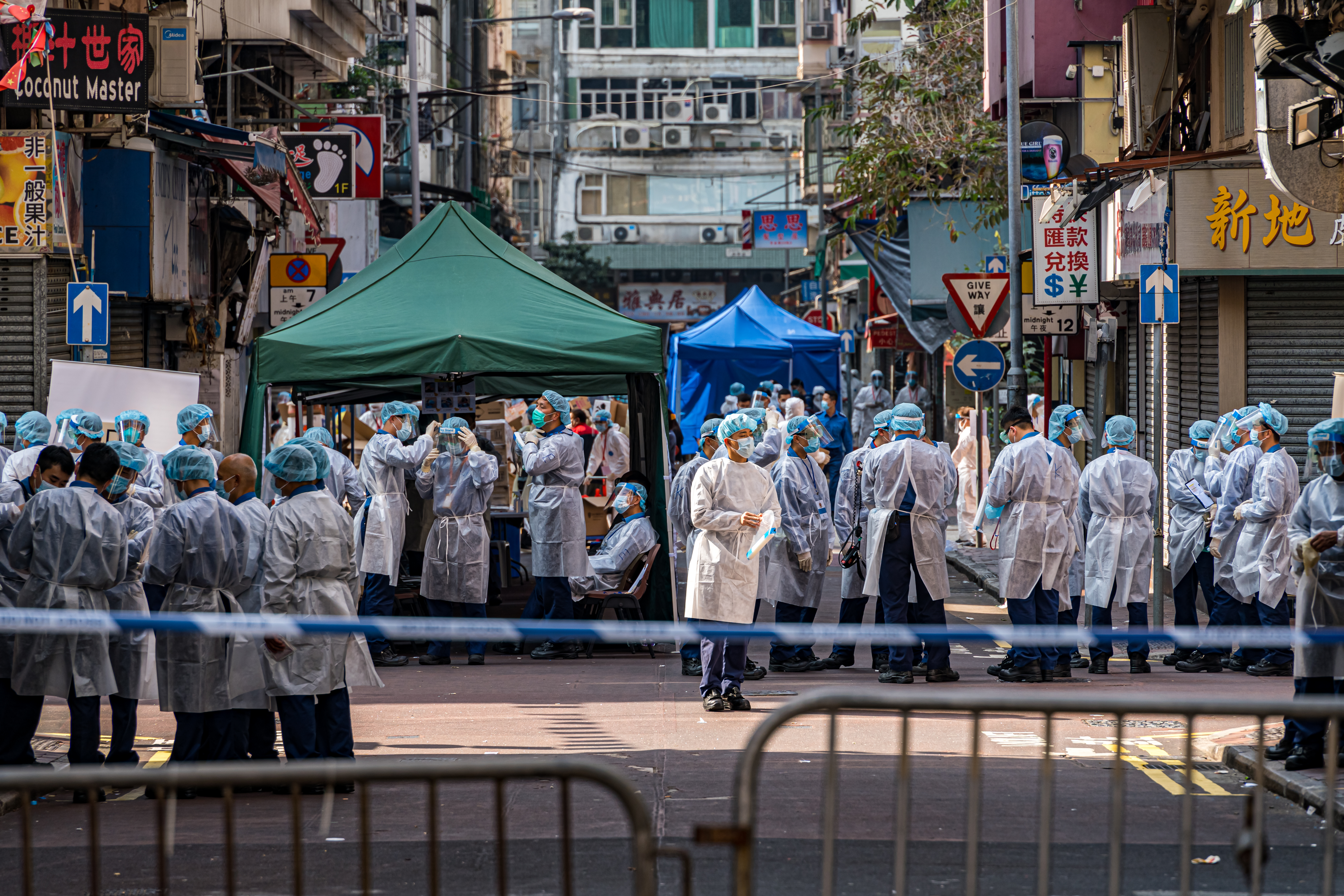
Healthcare workers in Hong Kong prepare to conduct mass COVID-19 testing of Jordan residents during a localised lockdown.

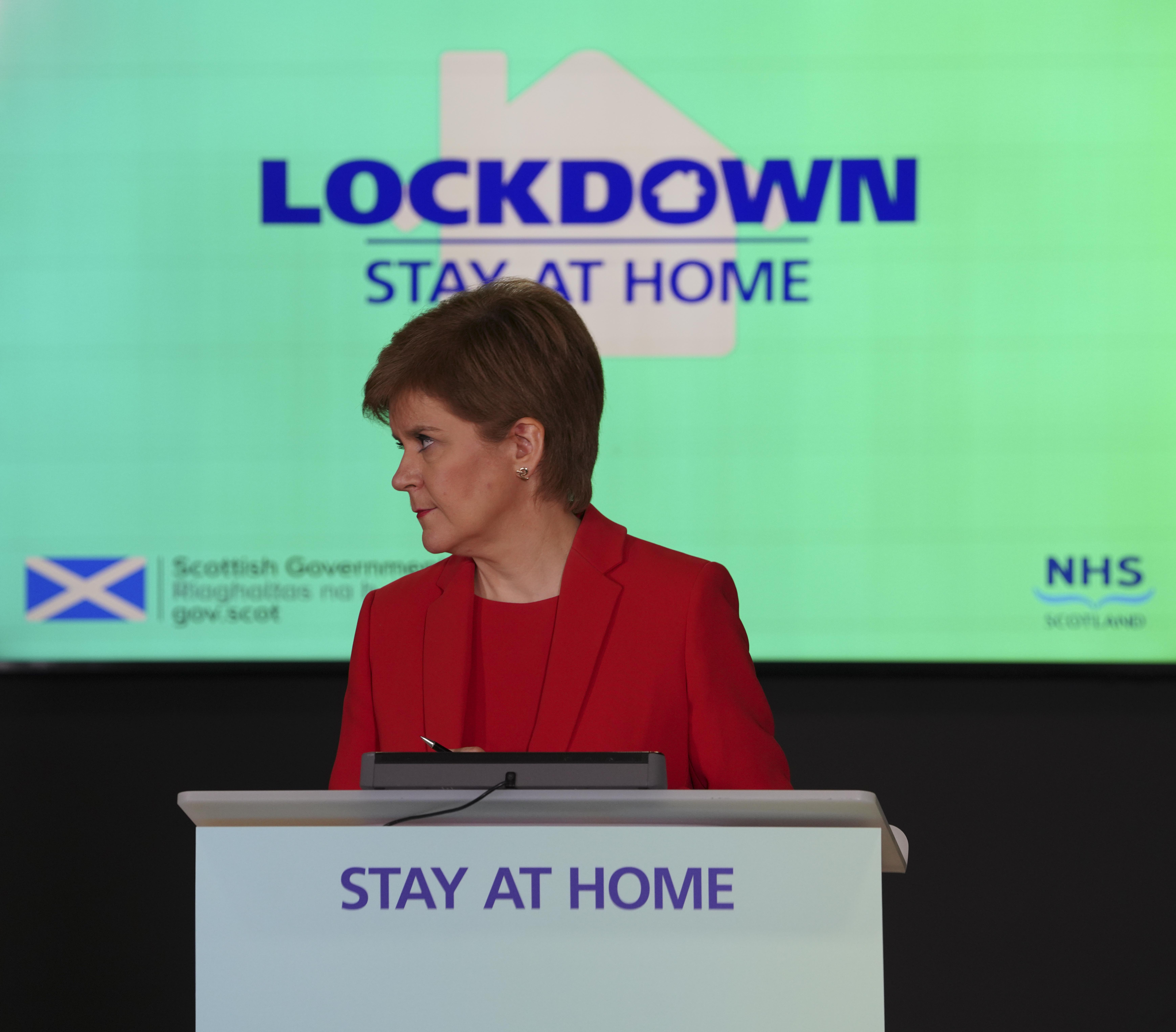
Scottish First Minister Nicola Sturgeon delivers a press conference instructing the public to stay at home during the COVID-19 pandemic in Scotland.

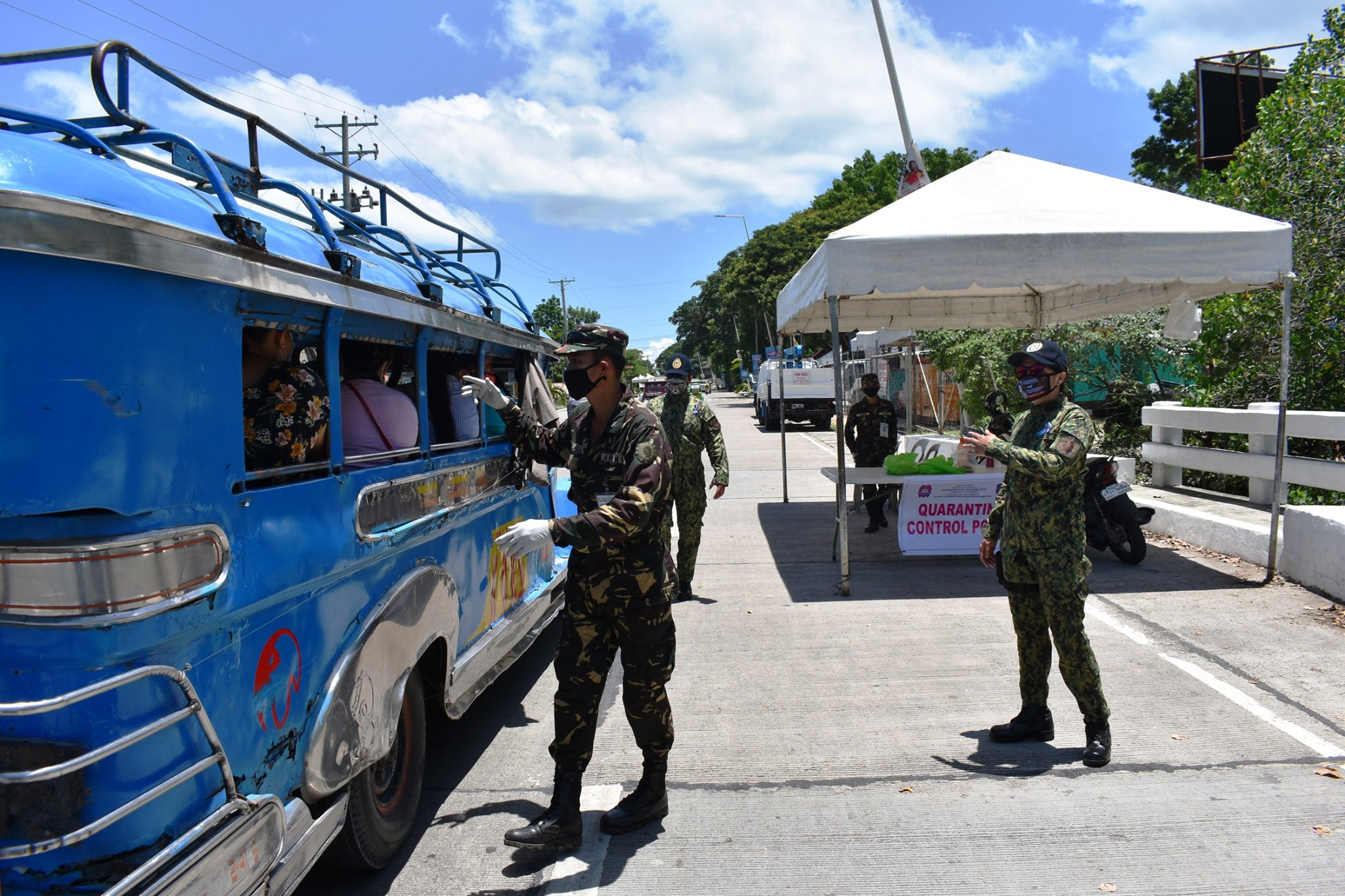
At a community quarantine checkpoint in Bohol, Philippines, police officers check a passing jeepney.

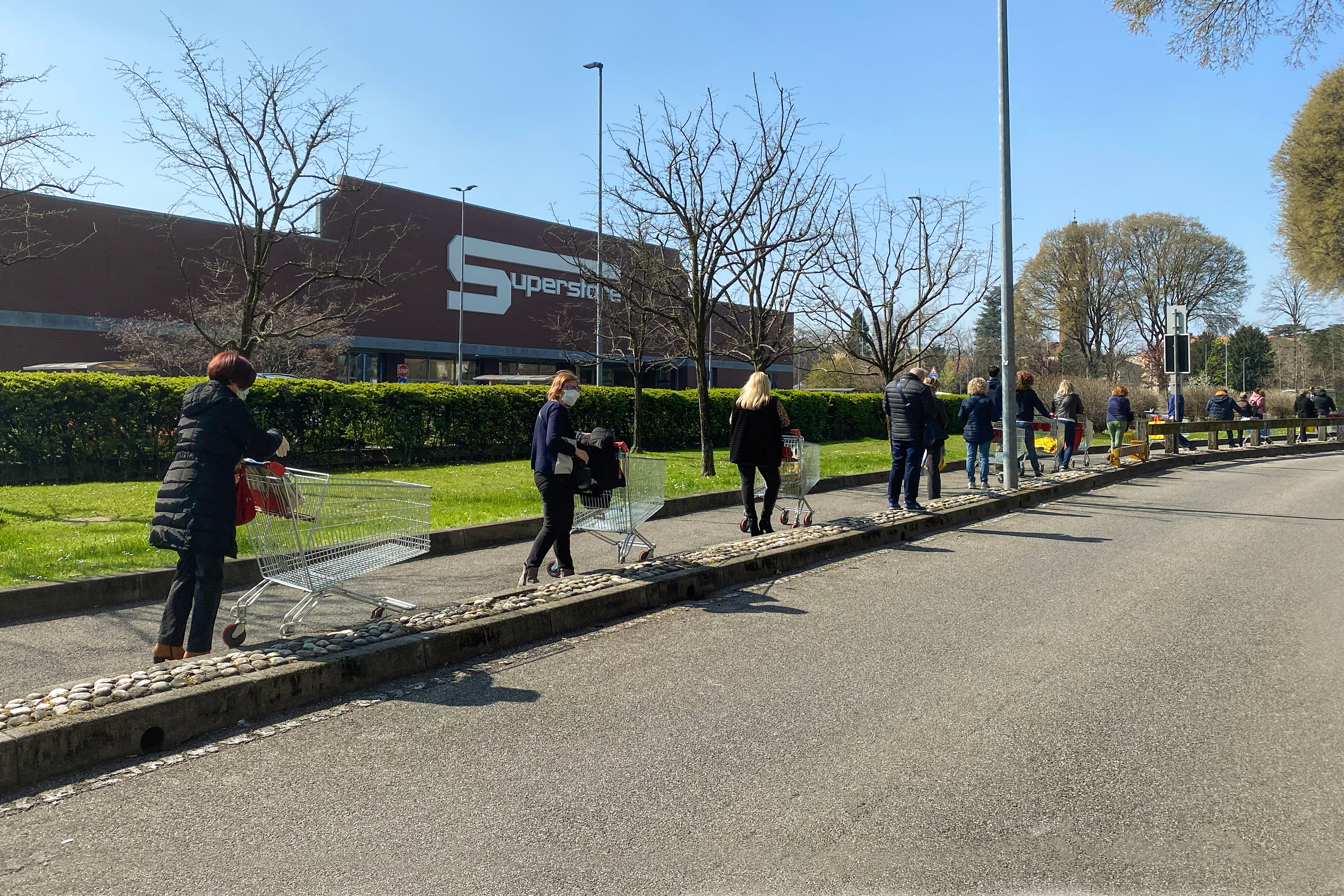
Queue in front of a supermarket in Italy caused by social distancing measures and supply shortages during the lockdown

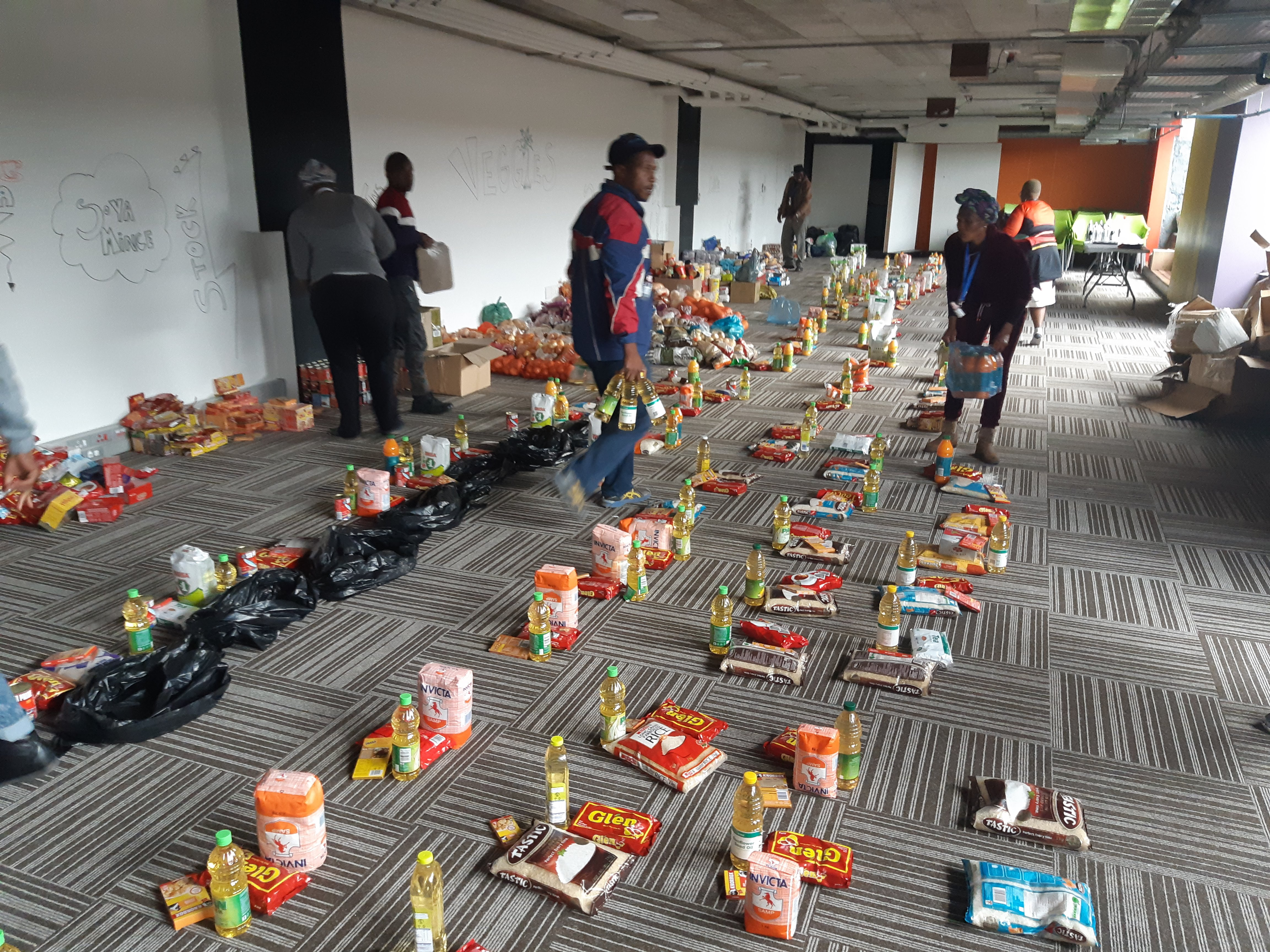
Volunteers in Cape Town pack food parcels to distribute to the needy during the pandemic lockdown in South Africa.

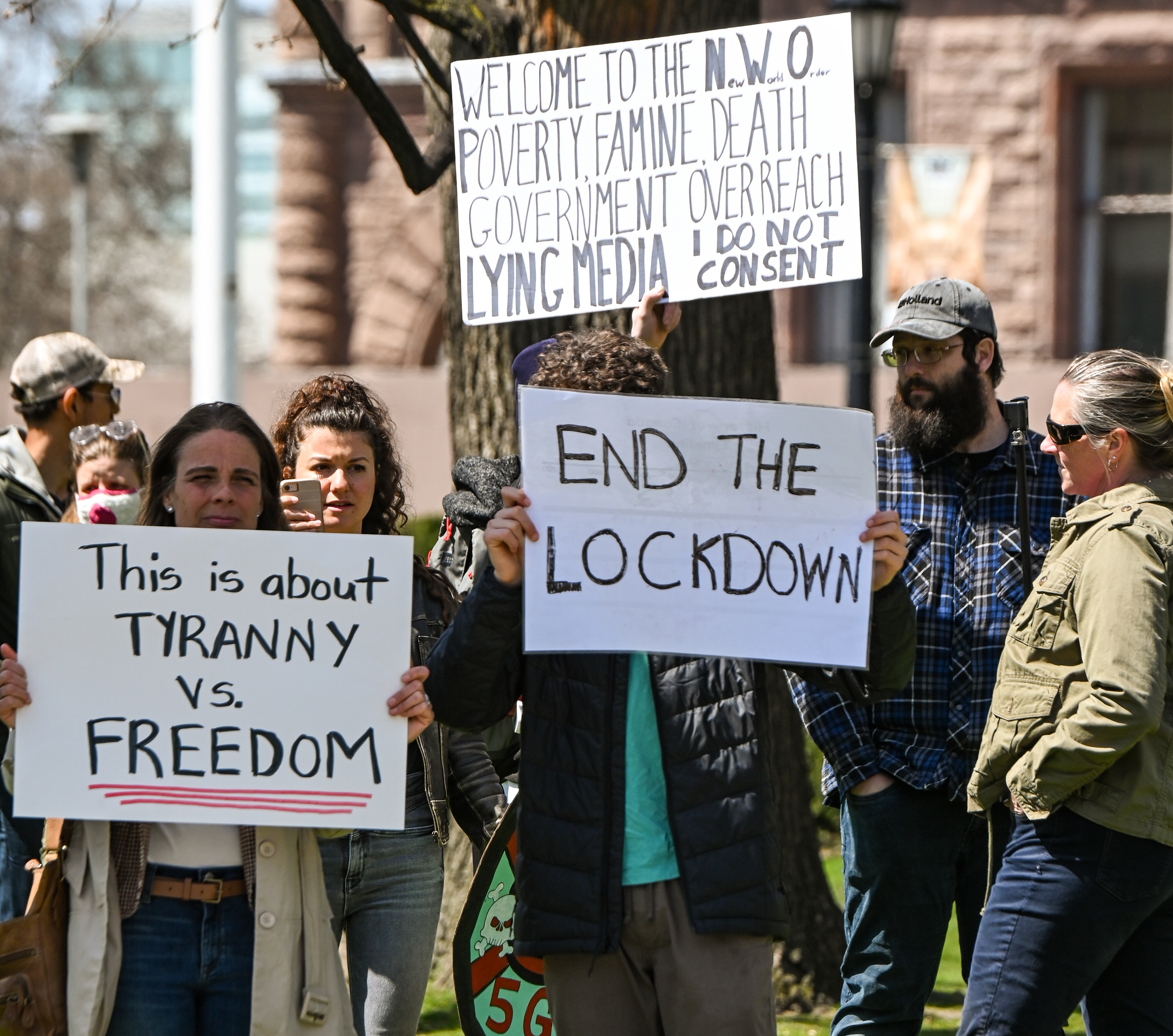
An anti-lockdown protest at Queen's Park in Toronto, Canada, on 25 April 2020

During the early stages of the COVID-19 pandemic, a number of non-pharmaceutical interventions, particularly lockdowns (encompassing stay-at-home orders, curfews, quarantines, cordons sanitaires and similar societal restrictions), were implemented in numerous countries and territories around the world. By April 2020, about half of the world's population was under some form of lockdown, with more than 3.9 billion people in more than 90 countries or territories having been asked or ordered to stay at home by their governments.

Researchers found the lockdowns may have reduced crime and violence carried out by armed non-state actors, such as the Islamic State, and other terrorist groups. In addition, lockdowns increased the uptake of remote work, reduced airborne pollution, and promoted the adoption of digital payment systems.

Research has also documented profound negative economic impacts, as well as declines in academic performance in schools and negative mental health consequences.

Large-scale protests were organized worldwide against lockdowns, with demonstrators arguing that stay-at-home orders infringed on constitutional rights, constituted excessive government control and violated civil liberties.

== Efficacy ==
Several researchers, from modelling and demonstrated examples, have concluded that lockdowns were somewhat effective at reducing the spread of, and deaths caused by, COVID-19. Lockdowns are thought to be most effective at containing or preventing COVID-19 community transmission, healthcare costs and deaths when implemented earlier, with greater stringency, and when not lifted too early.

A study investigating the spread based on studies of the most common symptoms such as loss of taste and smell in France, Italy and the UK showed a marked decrease in new symptoms just a few days after the start of confinement on the countries (Italy and France) with the strongest lockdowns. Modelling on the United States pandemic suggested "the pandemic would have been almost completely suppressed from significantly taking off if the lockdown measures were implemented two weeks earlier" and that the second wave would have been less severe had the lockdown lasted another two weeks.

The stringent lockdown in Hubei in early 2020 proved effective at controlling the COVID-19 outbreak in China. The relatively high number of cases and deaths in Sweden, which kept much of its society open during the pandemic, when compared to its neighbours with comparable demographics Norway, Denmark and Finland that did enforce lockdowns, is thought to be at least partly attributable to this difference in policy. Similarly, modelling on Australian data concluded that achieving zero community transmission through a strict lockdown lowers healthcare and economic costs compared to less stringent measures that allow transmission to continue, and warned that early relaxation of restrictions have greater costs. This "zero community transmission" approach was adopted in Australia, and a strict four-month lockdown in the state of Victoria during an outbreak in Melbourne, combined with other measures, averted a wider outbreak in the country in 2020. New Zealand and Vietnam also adopted a "Zero-COVID" strategy throughout 2020 that included targeted lockdowns. A natural experiment study finds that the partial lockdown in Kyrgyzstan (with curfews) was just as effective as the full lockdown in Kazakhstan (with many business closures) at reducing the spread of the virus.

The emergence of the highly transmissible SARS-CoV-2 Delta variant in 2021 led some commentators to suggest that although lockdowns continue to reduce the spread of COVID-19, they have become less effective at containing it. Lockdowns in Australia and Vietnam in response to Delta outbreaks proved less effective at containment than previous lockdowns were against the spread of other variants.

=== Voluntary versus mandatory restrictions ===
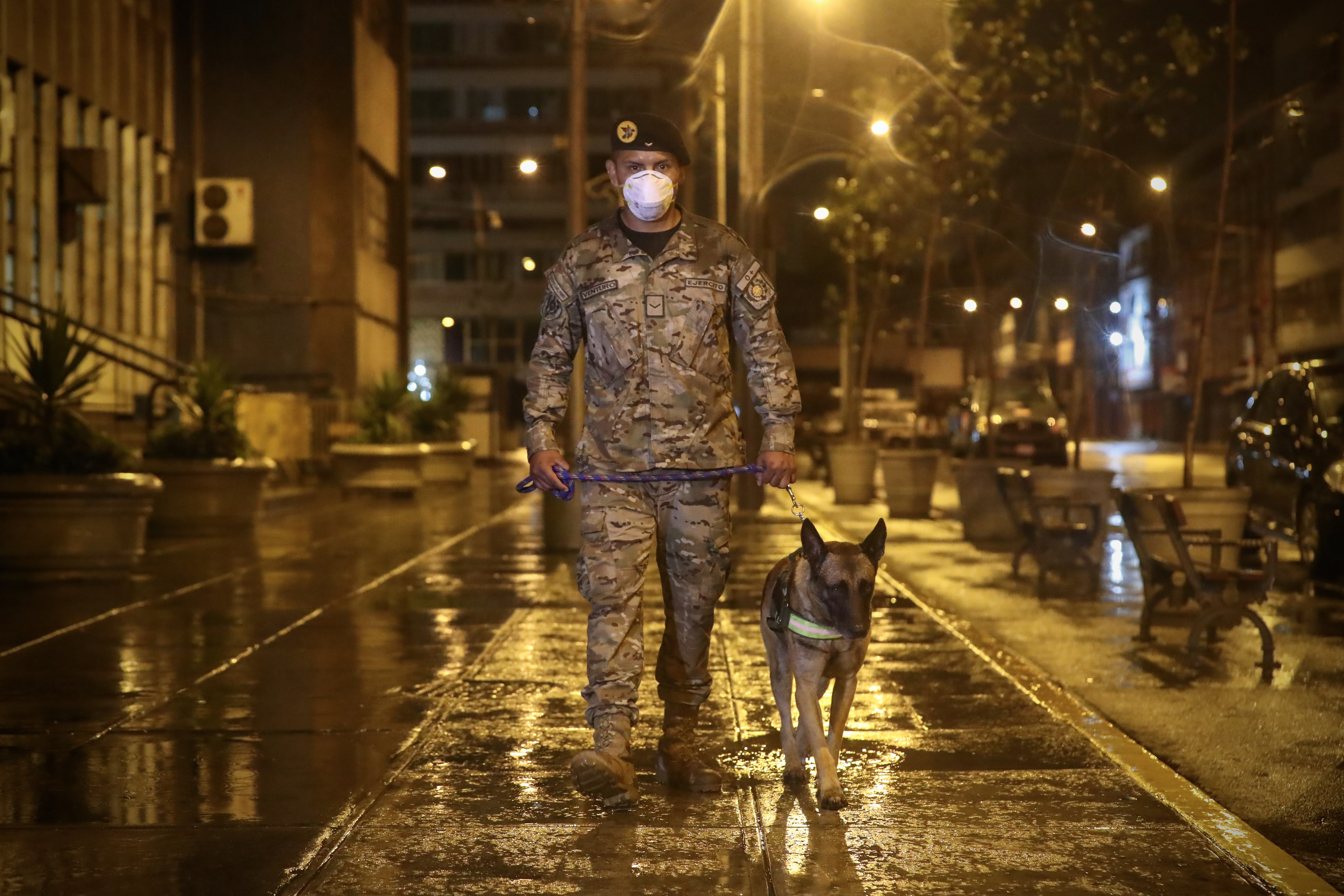
A member of the Peruvian Army with a police dog enforces curfew on 31 March 2020 during the COVID-19 pandemic in Peru.

One study led by an economist at the University of Chicago found that involuntary lockdowns had little impact, with voluntary distancing making up nearly 90% of the fall in consumer traffic as people feared the virus itself. Similarly, a National Bureau of Economic Research study found stay-at-home orders increased staying at home by just 5–10%. Another study from Yale University found that most social distancing was voluntary, driven primarily by "media coverage of morbidity and mortality".

On the other hand, some studies have argued that coercive measures probably decreased interactions, while accepting that most of the reduction may have been voluntary. One of those two studies, by Flaxman et al., has been criticized, among other things for having a country-specific adjustment factor, without which the model would predict a massive number of deaths for Sweden. One widely cited economic simulation asserting that shelter-in-place orders reduced total cases three-fold, however, held voluntary distancing constant. Another study found a 30% difference among border-counties where stay-at-home orders were imposed.

Another study that compared the impact of 'less restrictive interventions' on the spread of COVID-19 in Sweden and South Korea, with mandatory stay-at home orders in 8 other countries, such as France and Spain, did not find evidence for greater disease control in the countries with more restrictions. However, the findings of the study have been questioned due to its numerous limitations, including the small sample size of countries.

Some research has also found that an "advisory" approach is not adequate to control COVID-19 outbreaks. An analysis of an outbreak in northern Italy found that an effective reduction in community transmission occurred during a strict national lockdown, and that earlier less stringent measures were ineffective at reducing mobility to a level low enough to reduce the spread of COVID-19.

Since the beginning of the pandemic, Google has consistently collected data on movements, showing rapid declines in public activity long before legal restrictions were imposed. An April 2020 poll found that 93% of Americans voluntarily chose to only leave home when necessary, regardless of legal restrictions.

== Reception ==
A February 2021 review of 348 articles concluded there was acknowledgement of the importance of non-pharmaceutical interventions in controlling the spread of COVID-19. However, later research also acknowledges high societal costs, though in some circumstances less than the costs of allowing the pandemic to spread without mitigation.

=== Related to epidemiology ===
Epidemiological evidence supports generalized non-pharmaceutical interventions to curb the spread of COVID-19.

During the early stages of the pandemic in Europe and the United States, statistical modelling which advised that restrictions were helpful to prevent a large number of deaths were used as the basis for lockdowns. This includes an Imperial College projection, led by epidemiologist Neil Ferguson. Despite some criticisms, academics defended the Imperial projection as fundamentally sound, while admitting the code was "a buggy mess". Retrospective evaluation of lockdowns and computer modelling has verified that they have significantly contributed to reducing mortality and morbidity from COVID-19.

A notable opponent of lockdowns has included Sweden's state epidemiologist Anders Tegnell, who has frequently criticised the strategy. The Swedish government's approach has included minimal restrictions and has been controversial in part due to the relatively high death toll due to widespread transmission. However, the Swedish government began considering enacting a lockdown in early 2021.

While arguing in August 2020 for the need for further lockdowns in the United States, physicians Ranu Dhillon and Abraar Karan argued for "smarter lockdowns" that impose restrictions on areas with high levels of transmission, and to increase support to vulnerable populations in these locations to offset the economic costs.

A number of medical experts signed the Great Barrington Declaration in October 2020 which called for "Focused Protection" on high risk groups and minimal restrictions on the general population to achieve herd immunity through COVID-19 infection. However, the majority of medical experts and the WHO have strongly criticised this proposed strategy for its lack of scientific basis and for being unethical. The declaration has also attracted controversy over its funding and the authenticity of its signatures.

=== Related to social impacts ===
Anti-lockdown graffiti adjacent to Lady Bird Lake in downtown Austin, Texas. April 2020.

The lockdowns had multiple effects on people's everyday lives. Some of these were direct effects, such as cancelling or postponing a social event, and others had indirect effects, such as losing a sense of identity. For example, teachers often derive meaning and a sense of life purpose from teaching, but the schools were closed, which caused many of them to feel disconnected from their identity as teachers. Many people also felt that they could not trust that the things (e.g., doorknobs) and people around them were safe. People also lost a sense of time, with the feelings of unpredictability developing into the opposite of the normal human ontological security. Instead of knowing what to do, what to trust, and what to expect in the future, people felt disconnected and at a loss. It also made people more aware of the pre-existing problems they were facing, such as abuse, addiction, and racism. The sociologist Ann Swidler compared the social changes to anomie, an absence of social norms that was first described at the end of the Industrial Revolution, as the prior, socially agreed-upon system of interpersonal connections, values, interdependence, and ideas about normal behaviour was set aside, and a new system had not yet emerged.

Some commentators have suggested that stay-at-home orders are unconstitutional, or that states' use of emergency powers to restrict freedom of assembly and movement are authoritarian and may result in long-term democratic backsliding. Centralization of power by political leadership in Hungary, Poland, China and Cambodia in response to the COVID-19 pandemic have been cited as examples. Many states restricted religious gatherings.

Some researchers have noted that COVID-19 pandemic restrictions have come with mental health costs, compounded by those caused by the COVID-19 pandemic itself. Systematic reviews and meta-analyses indicate that the COVID-19 lockdowns were associated with increased rates of depression, anxiety, psychological distress, and a decline in health-related quality of life among children and adolescents, largely driven by school closures, social isolation, and disrupted routines. A rapid review published in the Lancet found that quarantine and lockdown measures were frequently associated with adverse psychological effects. Factors such as prolonged quarantine restrictions and inadequate information contributed to anxiety and post-traumatic stress symptoms.

Lockdowns during the COVID-19 pandemic also led to strained relationships, increased cyberbullying, and physical consequences like abuse, accidental poisonings, and foreign object injuries. Pandemic policies were associated with increased depressive symptoms, decreased physical activity, poorer nutrition, reduced emergency department visits, higher child mortality in Cameroon, a drop in immunizations in Pakistan, and an increase in physical child abuse trauma cases in one U.S. centre.

Due to their closure, educational institutions worldwide transitioned to online learning. Teachers and faculty had to learn new ways to engage with students while in a COVID-19 pandemic. Examples of online teaching tools are podcasts, videos, and virtual classrooms. Prolonged COVID-19 school closures and the ineffectiveness of remote learning, especially in low- and middle-income countries, exacerbated educational inequities, leading to substantial learning losses that could cost this generation of students $17 trillion in lifetime earnings. The COVID-19 pandemic disrupted education for 1.6 billion students at its peak, exacerbating the gender divide with disproportionately greater learning losses among girls and increased risks of child labour, gender-based violence, early marriage, and pregnancy in some countries. School closures during the pandemic resulted in significant learning loss, although some countries managed to limit the impact. The closures also led to a significant reduction in child abuse reporting, especially in Florida, where allegations of child abuse and neglect dropped by nearly one-third. This decline has been attributed to the limited access that teachers and school staff had to students, who typically serve as key reporters of child abuse.

UN Women warned in an April 2020 report that COVID-19 pandemic restrictions exacerbate gender inequalities and have led to an increase in domestic violence. Many women (and men), were being forced to 'lockdown' at home with their abusers at the same time that services to support survivors are being disrupted or made inaccessible. For instance, in France there was around a 30% spike in cases of violence against women since the lockdown in March 2020.

Telehealth had an important role to allow physicians not to miss the follow-up of patients with different chronic diseases and potentially helped to contain SARS-CoV-2 spreading among both patients and healthcare providers.

In late 2023, former Director of the National Institutes of Health (in the United States) Francis Collins went viral online amongst critics of the lockdown response when he discussed the lack of weight that public health authorities had given to the potential downsides of the lockdown measures when they were formulating the official response to COVID-19.

=== Related to economic impacts ===
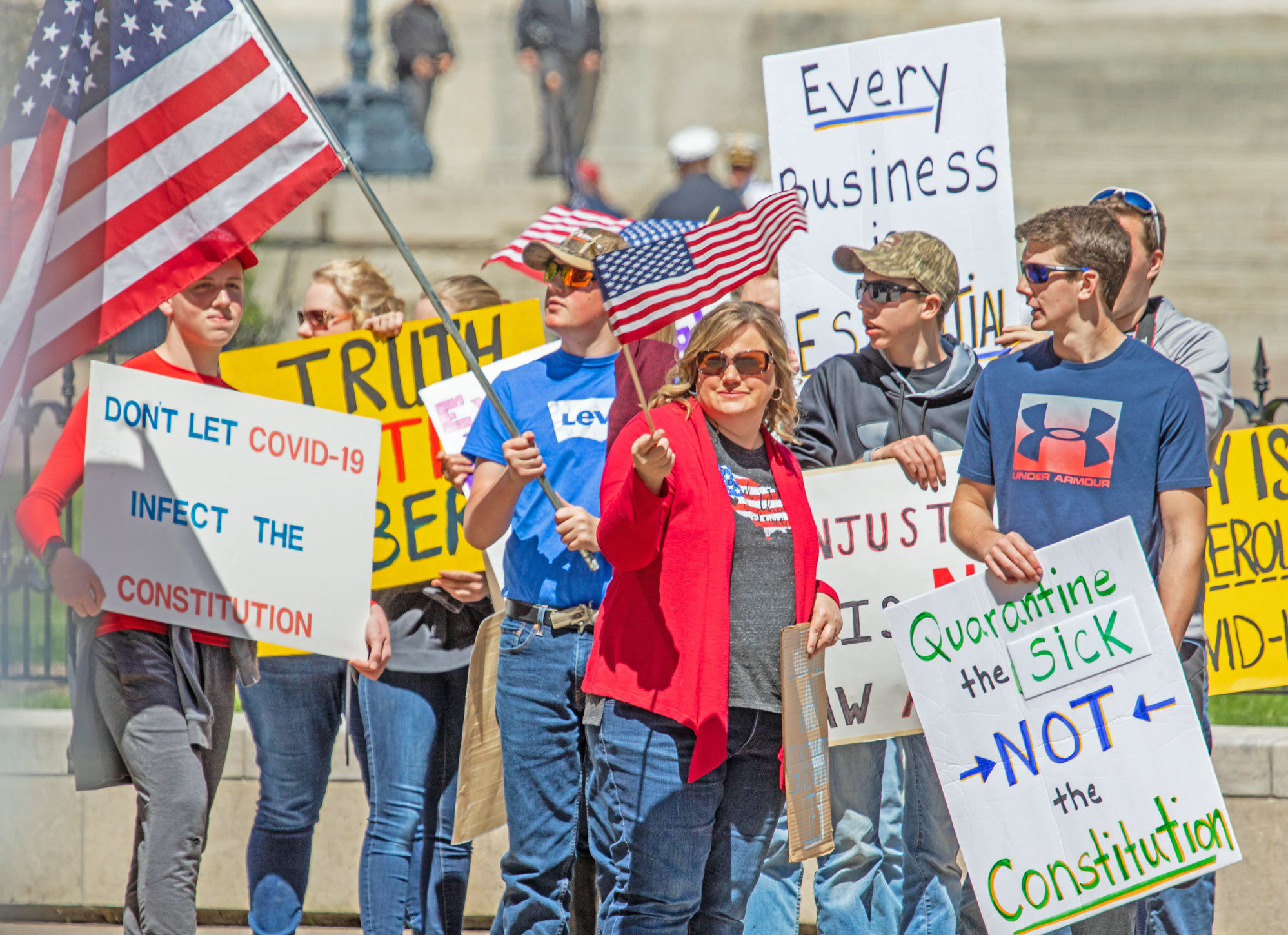
An anti-lockdown protest at the Ohio Statehouse in April 2020 amid the COVID-19 pandemic in the state

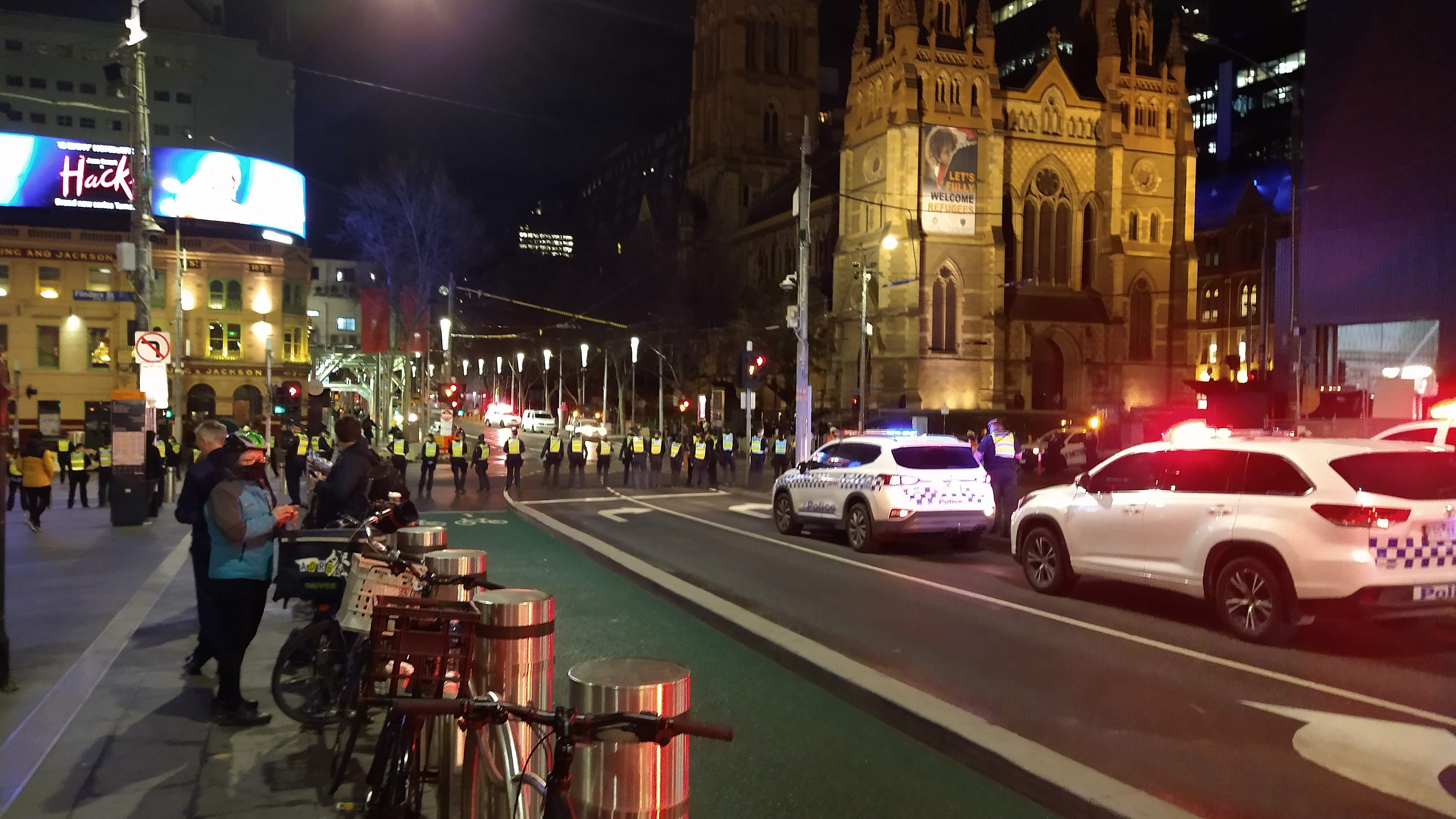
Police presence in Melbourne at an anti-lockdown protest

Some economists supported increased government funding for mitigation efforts, even at the cost of tolerating a very large economic contraction. They agreed that lockdowns should continue until the threat of resurgence has declined, even when considering only the economic impact. There was a general agreement, at least in some economic circles, that "severe lockdowns — including closing non-essential businesses and strict limitations on people's movement — are likely to be better for the economy in the medium term than less aggressive measures".

Both the World Food Programme (WFP) and the World Health Organization (WHO) have published statements noting the impact of the lockdowns on livelihoods and food security, and David Nabarro, WHO Special Envoy on COVID-19 stated in October 2020 that "lockdowns just have one consequence that you must never ever belittle, and that is making poor people an awful lot poorer".

=== Protests ===
There have also been a number of protests worldwide in opposition to lockdowns, including in the United Kingdom, the United States, Australia, Germany, the Netherlands, Canada and New Zealand. The motivations for and sizes of these protests have varied. Some have been spurred by the economic and social impacts of lockdowns, but have also been associated with misinformation related to the pandemic, conspiracy theories and anti-vaccination. Protestors also argued that stay-at-home orders infringed on constitutional rights, constituted excessive government control and violated civil liberties.

== Table of pandemic lockdowns ==
COVID-19 pandemic lockdowns
Country / territory	Place	First lockdown			Second lockdown			Third lockdown			Fourth lockdown			Fifth lockdown			Sixth lockdown			Seventh lockdown			Eighth lockdown			Total length (days)	Level
Country / territory	Place	Start date	End date	Length (days)	Start date	End date	Length (days)	Start date	End date	Length (days)	Start date	End date	Length (days)	Start date	End date	Length (days)	Start date	End date	Length (days)	Start date	End date	Length (days)	Start date	End date	Length (days)	Total length (days)	Level
Albania		2020-03-13	2020-06-01	80																						80	National
Algeria	Algiers	2020-03-23	2020-05-14	52																						52	City
Algeria	Blida	2020-03-23	2020-05-14	52																						52	City
Argentina	Greater Buenos Aires	2020-03-19	2020-11-08	234	2021-05-22	2021-05-30	9	2021-06-05	2021-06-06	2																245	Metropolitan area
Argentina	Rest of the country	2020-03-19	2020-05-10	52	2021-05-22	2021-05-30	9	2021-06-05	2021-06-06	2																63	National
Armenia		2020-03-24	2020-05-04	41																						41	National
Australia	Melbourne	2020-03-31	2020-05-12 (Note: Restrictions were further eased on 1 June 2021, however during the time between then and 12 May 2021, "Stay at home orders" were not active and hence this period didn't constitute what is internationally considered a "lockdown".)	43	2020-07-09 (Note: Stage 3 lockdown imposed on 8 July; Stage 4 lockdown imposed on 2 August 2020)	2020-10-27	111	2021-02-13	2021-02-17	5	2021-05-28	2021-06-10	14	2021-07-16	2021-07-27	12	2021-08-05	2021-10-21	78							263	Metropolitan area
Australia	Greater Shepparton	2020-03-31	2020-05-12	43	2020-08-06	2020-09-16	41	2021-02-13	2021-02-17	5	2021-05-28	2021-06-03	7	2021-07-16	2021-07-27	12	2021-08-05	2021-08-09	5	2021-08-21	2021-09-15	25	2021-10-02	2021-10-09	7	145	Local government area
Australia	Ballarat	2020-03-31	2020-05-12	43	2020-08-06	2020-09-16	41	2021-02-13	2021-02-17	5	2021-05-28	2021-06-03	7	2021-07-16	2021-07-27	12	2021-08-05	2021-08-09	5	2021-08-21	2021-09-09	20	2021-09-16	2021-09-22 (Note: End-date of lockdown is subject to the vaccine rollout. Restrictions are set to be eased when 70% of the eligible population has been vaccinated)	7	140	Local government area
Australia	Greater Geelong	2020-03-31	2020-05-12	43	2020-08-06	2020-09-16	41	2021-02-13	2021-02-17	5	2021-05-28	2021-06-03	7	2021-07-16	2021-07-27	12	2021-08-05	2021-08-09	5	2021-08-21	2021-09-09	20	2021-09-20	2021-09-26	7	140	Local government area
Australia	Surf Coast Shire	2020-03-31	2020-05-12	43	2020-08-06	2020-09-16	41	2021-02-13	2021-02-17	5	2021-05-28	2021-06-03	7	2021-07-16	2021-07-27	12	2021-08-05	2021-08-09	5	2021-08-21	2021-09-09	20	2021-09-20	2021-09-26	7	140	Local government area
Australia	Mitchell Shire	2020-03-31	2020-05-12	43	2020-07-09	2020-09-16	70	2021-02-13	2021-02-17	5	2021-05-28	2021-06-03	7	2021-07-16	2021-07-27	12	2021-08-05	2021-08-09	5	2021-08-21	2021-09-09	20	2021-09-20	2021-10-13 (Note: End-date of lockdown is subject to the vaccine rollout. Restrictions are set to be eased when 70% of the eligible population has been vaccinated)	24	186	Local government area
Australia	Mildura	2020-03-31	2020-05-12	43	2020-08-06	2020-09-16	41	2021-02-13	2021-02-17	5	2021-05-28	2021-06-03	7	2021-07-16	2021-07-27	12	2021-08-05	2021-08-09	5	2021-08-21	2021-09-09	20	2021-10-09	2021-10-22	14	147	Local government area
Australia	Latrobe Valley	2020-03-31	2020-05-12	43	2020-08-06	2020-09-16	41	2021-02-13	2021-02-17	5	2021-05-28	2021-06-03	7	2021-07-16	2021-07-27	12	2021-08-05	2021-08-09	5	2021-08-21	2021-09-09	20	2021-09-29	2021-10-06	7	140	Region
Australia	Rest of regional Victoria (Note: All of Victoria except Melbourne, Greater Shepparton, Ballarat, Greater Geelong, Surf Coast Shire and Mitchell Shire)	2020-03-31	2020-05-12	43	2020-08-06	2020-09-16	41	2021-02-13	2021-02-17	5	2021-05-28	2021-06-03	7	2021-07-16	2021-07-27	12	2021-08-05	2021-08-09	5	2021-08-21	2021-09-09	20				133	State
Australia	South Australia				2020-11-19	2020-11-22	3	2021-07-21	2021-07-27	7																62	State
Australia	Southern Tasmania				2021-10-16	2021-10-19	3																			55	State
Australia	Northern Beaches (NSW)				2020-12-19	2021-01-10	22	2021-06-26	2021-10-11 (Note: End-date of lockdown is subject to the vaccine rollout or 0 cases for 14 days. Restrictions are set to be eased when 70% of the eligible population has been vaccinated)	107																181	Local government area
Australia	Brisbane				2021-01-08	2021-01-11	3	2021-03-29	2021-04-01	3	2021-06-29	2021-07-03	4	2021-07-31	2021-08-08	8										67	Metropolitan area
Australia	Perth				2021-01-31	2021-02-05	5	2021-04-23	2021-04-26	3	2021-06-28	2021-07-02	4													61	Metropolitan area
Australia	Peel				2021-01-31	2021-02-05	5	2021-04-23	2021-04-26	3	2021-06-28	2021-07-02	4													61	Region
Australia	South West				2021-01-31	2021-02-05	5																			57	Region
Australia	Illawarra				2021-06-26	2021-10-11 (Note: End-date of lockdown is subject to the vaccine rollout or 0 cases for 14 days. Restrictions are set to be eased when 70% of the eligible population has been vaccinated)	107																			159	Region
Australia	Greater Sydney				2021-06-26	2021-10-11 (Note: End-date of lockdown is subject to the vaccine rollout or 0 cases for 14 days. Restrictions are set to be eased when 70% of the eligible population has been vaccinated)	107																			159	Metropolitan area
Australia	Darwin				2021-06-27	2021-07-02	5	2021-08-16	2021-08-19	3																57	Metropolitan area
Australia	South East Queensland				2021-06-29	2021-07-02	3	2021-07-31	2021-08-08	8																63	Region
Australia	Townsville				2021-06-29	2021-07-02	3	2021-07-31	2021-08-08	8																63	Metropolitan area
Australia	Alice Springs				2021-06-30	2021-07-03	3																			55	Metropolitan area
Australia	Central West				2021-07-20	2021-07-27	7	2021-08-14	2021-10-11 (Note: End-date of lockdown is subject to the vaccine rollout or 0 cases for 14 days. Restrictions are set to be eased when 70% of the eligible population has been vaccinated)	58																117	Region
Australia	Hunter Valley				2021-08-05	2021-10-11 (Note: End-date of lockdown is subject to the vaccine rollout or 0 cases for 14 days. Restrictions are set to be eased when 70% of the eligible population has been vaccinated)	67																			119	Region
Australia	Upper Hunter				2021-08-05	2021-09-16 (Note: End-date of lockdown is subject to the vaccine rollout or 0 cases for 14 days. Restrictions are set to be eased when 70% of the eligible population has been vaccinated)	42																			94	Region
Australia	Muswellbrook				2021-08-05	2021-09-16 (Note: End-date of lockdown is subject to the vaccine rollout or 0 cases for 14 days. Restrictions are set to be eased when 70% of the eligible population has been vaccinated)	42	2021-09-28	2021-10-11 (Note: End-date of lockdown is subject to the vaccine rollout or 0 cases for 14 days. Restrictions are set to be eased when 70% of the eligible population has been vaccinated)	13																107	Local government area
Australia	Armidale				2021-08-07	2021-09-10	34																			87	Local government area
Australia	Cairns Region				2021-08-08	2021-08-11	3																			55	Region
Australia	Yarrabah				2021-08-08	2021-08-11	3																			55	Local government area
Australia	Richmond Valley				2021-08-09	2021-09-10	32																			84	Local government area
Australia	Lismore				2021-08-09	2021-09-10	32	2021-09-16	2021-09-23	7	2021-10-03	2021-10-11	8													99	Local government area
Australia	Byron Shire				2021-08-09	2021-09-10	32	2021-09-21	2021-09-28	7																91	Local government area
Australia	Ballina				2021-08-09	2021-09-10	32																			84	Local government area
Australia	Tamworth				2021-08-09	2021-09-10	32																			84	Local government area
Australia	Dubbo				2021-08-11	2021-10-11 (Note: End-date of lockdown is subject to the vaccine rollout or 0 cases for 14 days. Restrictions are set to be eased when 70% of the eligible population has been vaccinated)	61																			113	Local government area
Australia	Australian Capital Territory				2021-08-12	2021-10-15	61																			114	Territory
Australia	Regional NSW (Note: Applies for all others Regional NSW outside Greater Sydney, Hunter Region, Dubbo, Central West, South Coast, Goulburn, Queanbeyan-Palerang and Snowy Monaro)				2021-08-14	2021-09-10	28																			81	Region
Australia	Mid-Coast				2021-08-14	2021-09-10	28																			81	Local government area
Australia	South Coast (Note: Applies for all South Coast except Bega Valley after 16/09/2021)				2021-08-14	2021-10-11 (Note: End-date of lockdown is subject to the vaccine rollout or 0 cases for 14 days. Restrictions are set to be eased when 70% of the eligible population has been vaccinated)	57																			109	Region
Australia	Bega Valley				2021-08-14	2021-09-16 (Note: End-date of lockdown is subject to the vaccine rollout or 0 cases for 14 days. Restrictions are set to be eased when 70% of the eligible population has been vaccinated)	33																			85	Local government area
Australia	Goulburn–Mulwaree				2021-08-14	2021-10-11 (Note: End-date of lockdown is subject to the vaccine rollout or 0 cases for 14 days. Restrictions are set to be eased when 70% of the eligible population has been vaccinated)	57																			109	Local government area
Australia	Snowy Monaro				2021-08-14	2021-09-16 (Note: End-date of lockdown is subject to the vaccine rollout or 0 cases for 14 days. Restrictions are set to be eased when 70% of the eligible population has been vaccinated)	33	2021-09-30	2021-10-11	11																96	Local government area
Australia	Yass Valley				2021-08-14	2021-09-10	28	2021-09-14	2021-09-27	14																94	Local government area
Australia	Albury (NSW)				2021-08-14	2021-09-10	28	2021-09-16	2021-09-23	7																87	Local government area
Australia	Cowra				2021-08-14	2021-09-10	28	2021-09-20	2021-10-05	14																94	Local government area
Australia	Glen Innes Severn (NSW)				2021-08-14	2021-09-10	28	2021-09-17	2021-09-24	7																87	Local government area
Australia	Hilltops (NSW)				2021-08-14	2021-09-10	28	2021-09-17	2021-10-01	14																94	Local government area
Australia	Port Macquarie-Hastings				2021-08-14	2021-09-10	28	2021-09-28	2021-10-05	7																87	Local government area
Australia	Oberon				2021-08-14	2021-09-10	28	2021-09-29	2021-10-11	12																92	Local government area
Australia	Gunnedah				2021-08-14	2021-09-10	28	2021-10-05	2021-10-11	6																86	Local government area
Australia	Casino				2021-08-14	2021-09-10	28	2021-10-02	2021-10-11	9																89	Town
Australia	Rest of the country (Note: Applies for further measures in each Australian state and territory)	2020-03-23	2020-05-15	52																						52	National
Austria		2020-03-16	2020-04-13	28	2020-11-03	2020-11-30	27	2020-12-26	2021-02-07	43	2021-11-22	2021-12-11	20													118	National
Azerbaijan		2020-03-31	2020-08-30	152																						152	National
Bangladesh		2020-03-26	2020-05-16	51	2021-04-05	2021-07-14	100	2021-07-23	2021-08-10	18																169	National
Barbados		2020-03-28	2020-05-03	36																						36	National
Belgium		2020-03-18	2020-05-04	47	2020-11-02	2020-12-14	42	2021-03-27	2021-04-26	30																119	National
Bermuda		2020-04-04	2020-05-02	28																						28	National
Bhutan		2020-08-11	2020-09-01	21																						21	National
Bolivia		2020-03-22	2020-07-31	131																						131	National
Botswana		2020-04-02	2020-04-30	28																						28	National
Brazil	Santa Catarina	2020-03-17	2020-04-07	21																						21	State
Brazil	São Paulo	2020-03-24	2020-05-10	47																						47	State
Bulgaria		2020-03-13 (Note: Initially to last until 13 April 2020, included closures of universities, schools, restaurants and other establishments, a ban on mass gatherings, suspension of sports competitions for more than two months, certain temporary restrictions on the free movement of citizens, but no strict "Stay at home order". A number of lockdown measures were already eased or lifted in April and May 2020.)	2020-06-15 (Note: Depending on the strictness of the definition for a lockdown; some sources such as Politico Europe consider it to have ended by 9 May, with a total duration of 57 days.)	94	2020-11-28 (de facto) (Note: Closures of all educational institutions, restaurants and other establishments, a ban on most cultural events, all excursions and forms of group tourism, children forbidden to participate in organized sports events, no "Stay at home order", described as a "soft" or "partial" lockdown and officially entered into force at 23:30 on 27 November.)	2021-01-31 (Note: The lockdown was initially to end on 21 December 2020, but was subsequently extended until 31 January 2021, though with a few of the restrictions relaxed, such as children in kindergartens and in grades 1-4 being able to attend in-person classes from January 2021.)	65	2021-03-22 (Note: Preceded by some measures on the regional level, no "Stay at home order".)	2021-03-31	10																169	National
Cambodia	Phnom Penh	2021-04-15	2021-05-05	21																						21	Municipality
Cambodia	Ta Khmau	2021-04-15	2021-05-05	21																						21	Municipality
Canada	British Columbia	2020-03-18	2020-05-18	61	2020-11-07	2021-01-08	62																			123	Province
Canada	Ontario	2020-03-17	2020-05-14	58				2021-04-03	2021-05-01	28																86	Province
Canada	Ontario - South				2020-12-26	2021-01-23	28	2021-04-08	2021-06-02	55																83	Region
Canada	Ontario - North				2020-12-26	2021-01-09	14																			14	Region
Canada	Quebec	2020-03-18	2020-05-04	47	2020-12-25	2021-01-11	18																			65	Province
Colombia		2020-03-25	2020-06-30	97																						97	National
Congo		2020-03-31	2020-04-20	20																						20	National
Costa Rica		2020-03-23	2020-05-01	39																						39	National
Croatia		2020-03-18	2020-05-11	32	2020-12-22	2020-12-29	7																			39	National
Cyprus		2020-03-24	2020-04-13	20	2021-01-10	2021-01-31	21	2021-04-26	2021-05-09	13																54	National
Czech Republic		2020-03-16	2020-04-12	27	2020-10-22	2021-03-28	174																			201	National
Denmark		2020-03-12	2020-04-13	33	2020-12-25	2021-03-01	66																			99	National
Ecuador		2020-03-16	2020-03-31	15																						15	National
El Salvador		2020-03-12	2020-04-02	21																						21	National
Eritrea		2020-04-02	2020-04-23	21																						21	National
Estonia		2021-03-11	2021-04-11	31																						31	National
Fiji	Lautoka	2020-03-20	2020-04-07	18	2021-04-19																					18	City
Fiji	Suva	2020-04-03	2020-04-17	14																						14	City
France	Nationwide	2020-03-17	2020-05-11	55	2020-10-30	2020-12-15	46	2021-04-04	2021-05-03	29																130	National
France	Paris			55			46	2021-03-19	2021-04-18	30																131	Region
Finland		2021-03-08	2021-03-28	20																						20	National
Georgia		2020-03-31	2020-04-21	21																						21	National
Germany	different regionally	2020-03-16 (Note: Lockdown was started in Freiburg, Baden-Württemberg and Bavaria on 20 March 2020. Two days later, it was expanded to the whole of Germany)	2020-05-30 to 2020-05-11	76	2020-11-02	2021-03-01 to 2021-06-11	119 to 222																			179 to 298	National
Germany	Berchtesgadener Land			76	2020-10-20	2020-11-03	14																			43 to 64	District
Ghana	Accra	2020-03-30	2020-04-12	13																						13	Metropolitan area
Ghana	Kumasi	2020-03-30	2020-04-12	13																						13	Metropolitan area
Greece	Nationwide	2020-03-23	2020-05-04	42	2020-11-07	2021-03-22	135																			177	National
Greece	Thessaloniki			42	2020-11-03	2021-03-22	139																			181	Regional unit
Greece	Serres			42	2020-11-03	2021-03-22	139																			181	Regional unit
Guernsey		2020-03-25	2020-06-20	87	2021-01-23	2021-02-22	30																			117	National
Honduras		2020-03-20	2020-05-17	58																						58	National
Hungary		2020-03-28	2020-04-10	13																						13	National
India	Nationwide	2020-03-25	2020-06-07	74																						74	National
India	Bengaluru				2021-04-27	2021-05-09	12																			12	Region
India	Delhi				2021-04-19	2021-05-31	42																			42	Region
India	Haryana				2021-05-03	2021-05-10	7																			7	State
India	Maharashtra				2021-04-14	2021-06-15	62																			62	State
India	Odisha				2021-05-05	2021-05-19	14																			14	State
India	Rajasthan				2021-05-10	2021-06-08	29																			29	State
India	Uttar Pradesh				2021-04-30	2021-05-10	10																			10	State
Iran		2020-03-14	2020-04-20	37	2021-04-14	2021-04-24	14																			47	National
Iraq		2020-03-22	2020-04-11	20																						20	National
Ireland	All 26 counties	2020-03-12 (Note: A national stay-at-home order was officially declared on 27 March)	2020-05-18	67	2020-10-21	2020-12-01	41	2020-12-24 (Note: A full third lockdown was declared from 30 December and was repeatedly extended.)	2021-04-12	119																227	National
Ireland	Kildare	2020-08-07	2020-08-31	24																						24	Regional
Ireland	Laois	2020-08-07	2020-08-21	14																						14	Regional
Ireland	Offaly	2020-08-07	2020-08-21	14																						14	Regional
Israel	Bnei Brak	2020-04-02	2020-04-16	14			30			42																86	City
Israel	Nationwide				2020-09-18	2020-10-18	30	2020-12-27	2021-02-07	42																72	National
Italy	Nationwide	2020-03-09 (Note: Lockdown was first started in Northern Italy on 8 March 2020, then expanded to the rest of Italy the following day)	2020-05-18	70	2020-12-24 (Note: The lockdown was suspended on 28, 29, 30 December 2020 and 4 January 2021)	2021-01-06	13	2021-03-15	2021-04-30	46																129	National
Italy	Lombardy			70	2020-11-06	2020-12-03	27	2021-01-17	2021-01-30	13																110	Region
Italy	Piedmont			70	2020-11-06	2020-12-03	27																			97	Region
Italy	Aosta Valley			70	2020-11-06	2020-12-03	27																			97	Region
Italy	Calabria			70	2020-11-06	2020-12-03	27																			97	Region
Italy	Sicily			70				2021-01-17	2021-01-30	13																83	Region
Italy	Province of Bolzano			70				2021-01-17	2021-01-30	13																83	Province
Jamaica	Saint Catherine	2020-04-15	2020-04-22	7																						7	Parish
Jordan		2020-03-18	2020-04-30	43	2020-11-10	2020-11-15	5																			48	National
Kosovo		2020-03-14	2020-05-04	51																						51	National
Kuwait		2020-05-10	2020-05-31	21																						21	National
Lebanon		2020-03-15	2020-03-28	13	2020-11-14	2020-11-28	14																			27	National
Libya		2020-03-22	2020-06-27	97																						97	National
Lithuania		2020-03-16	2020-06-18	94	2020-11-07	2020-11-28	21																			115	National
Madagascar	Antananarivo	2020-03-23	2020-04-20	28																						28	City
Madagascar	Toamasina	2020-03-23	2020-04-20	28																						28	City
Malaysia		2020-03-18	2020-06-09	83	2021-01-13	2021-02-10	28	2021-06-01	2021-08-16	76																187	National
Mexico	Nationwide	2020-03-23	2020-06-01	70																						70	National
Mexico	Chihuahua			70	2020-10-23	2020-12-06	44																			114	State
Mexico	Durango			70	2020-11-03	2020-12-06	33																			103	State
Mexico	Baja California			70	2020-12-07																					70	State
Mexico	Mexico City			70	2020-12-19																					70	State
Mexico	State of Mexico			70	2020-12-19																					70	State
Mexico	Morelos			70	2021-01-04																					70	State
Mexico	Guanajuato			70	2021-01-04																					70	State
Mongolia		2020-03-10	2020-03-16	6	2020-11-17	2020-12-01	15																			21	National
Montenegro	Tuzi	2020-03-24	2020-05-05	42																						42	Municipality
Morocco		2020-03-19	2020-06-10	83																						83	National
Myanmar	Yangon	2020-04-18	2020-07-01	74	2020-09-01	2021-04-10	220	2021-07-08	2021-10-27	111																405	City
Namibia		2020-03-27 (Note: Lockdown was started in the regions of Erongo and Khomas but effectively enforced countrywide. On 14 April the lockdown was extended to 4 May and to all of Namibia.)	2020-05-04	38																						38	
Nepal	Nationwide	2020-03-24	2020-07-21	120																						120	
Nepal	Kathmandu			120	2020-08-20	2020-09-09	21																			141	City
Netherlands		2020-03-15	2020-04-06	22	2020-12-15	2021-06-05	172	2021-12-19	2022-01-14	26																220	National
New Zealand	Nationwide	2020-03-23	2020-05-13	52	2021-08-18	2021-09-07	21																			73	National
New Zealand	Auckland			52	2020-08-12	2020-08-30	19	2021-02-14	2021-02-17	3	2021-02-28	2021-03-07	7	2021-08-18	2021-11-29(TBC)	104										185	Region
Nigeria	Abuja	2020-03-30	2020-04-12	13																						13	City
Nigeria	Lagos	2020-03-30	2020-04-12	13																						13	City
Nigeria	Ogun	2020-03-30	2020-04-12	13																						13	State
Northern Cyprus		2020-03-30	2020-05-04	35																						35	National
North Korea	Nationwide	2022-05-12	not set	not set																							National
North Korea	Kaesong	2020-07-25	2020-08-14	20																						20	City
Oman	Muscat	2020-04-10	2020-05-29	49																						49	Governorate
Oman	Jalan Bani Bu Ali	2020-04-16	2020-05-29	43																						43	Province
Pakistan		2020-03-24	2020-05-09	46	2021-05-08	2021-05-18	10																			46	National
Panama		2020-03-25	2020-05-31 (downgraded to a night and weekend curfew)	67																						67	National
Papua New Guinea		2020-03-24	2020-04-07	14																						14	National
Paraguay		2020-03-20	2020-05-03	44																						44	National
Peru		2020-03-16	2020-06-30	106																						106	National
Philippines	Cebu	2020-03-27	2020-05-15 (Note: Except in Cebu City only where it was extended to 16 days) to 2020-05-31 (Note: Lockdown was extended to areas under high risk COVID-19 zones)	49 to 65																						49 to 65	Province
Philippines	Davao Region	2020-03-19	2020-05-15	57																						57	Region
Philippines	Luzon	2020-03-15 (Note: Lockdown was started in Metro Manila, but expanded to the rest of Luzon two days later, 17 March 2020)	2020-04-30 (Note: In most Luzon areas only, except Metro Manila and selected areas of Luzon are on high risk COVID-19 zones) to 2020-05-15 (Note: Lockdown was extended to Metro Manila and remaining areas of Luzon) to 2020-05-31	46 to 61 to 77	2020-08-04 (Note: Metro Manila, Bulacan, Cavite and Rizal only.)	2020-08-18	15	2021-01-25	2021-02-15	21	2021-03-29	2021-09-15	170													61 to 92	Island group
Philippines	Soccsksargen	2020-03-23	2020-05-15	53																						53	Region
Poland		2020-03-13	2020-04-11	29	2020-12-28	2021-01-17	20	2021-03-20	2021-04-25	36																85	National
Portugal		2020-03-19	2020-04-02	14	2021-01-15	2021-03-15	59																			73	National
Qatar	Doha Industrial Area	2020-03-11	2020-06-15	96																						96	Industrial park
Romania		2020-03-25	2020-05-12	48																						48	National
Russia	Moscow	2020-03-30	2020-05-12	43	2021-10-28	2021-11-04	7																			50	Metropolitan area
Russia	Rest of the country (Note: Applies for mandatory holidays and further measures in each Russian region)	2020-03-28	2020-04-30	33																						33	National
Rwanda		2020-03-21	2020-04-19	29																						29	National
Samoa		2020-03-26	2020-04-08	13																						13	National
San Marino		2020-03-14	2020-05-05	52																						52	National
Saudi Arabia	Jeddah	2020-03-29	2020-06-21	84																						84	City
Saudi Arabia	Mecca	2020-03-26	2020-06-21	87																						87	City
Saudi Arabia	Medina	2020-03-26	2020-06-21	87																						87	City
Saudi Arabia	Qatif	2020-03-09	2020-06-21	104																						104	Area
Saudi Arabia	Riyadh	2020-03-26	2020-06-21	87																						87	City
Serbia		2020-03-15	2020-04-21 to 2020-05-04	37 to 50																						37 to 50	National
Singapore		2020-04-07	2020-06-01	56	2021-05-16	2021-06-13	28	2021-07-22	2021-08-09	18	2021-09-27	2021-11-21	56													158	National
South Africa		2020-03-26	2020-04-30	35	2020-12-28	2021-01-15	18	2021-06-28	2021-07-25	27																80	National
Spain		2020-03-14	2020-05-09	56																						56	National
Sri Lanka		2020-03-18	2020-06-21	95	2021-08-20	2021-10-01	42																			137	National
Switzerland		2020-03-17	2020-04-27	41	2021-01-18	2021-03-01	42																			83	National
Thailand		2020-03-25	2020-05-31	67																						67	National
Trinidad and Tobago		2020-03-17	2020-03-31	14																						14	National
Tunisia		2020-03-22	2020-04-19	28																						28	National
Turkey		2020-04-23	2020-04-27	4																						4	Only in 30 metropolitan cities and Zonguldak.
Turkey	Nationwide	2021-04-29	2021-05-17	18																						18	National
Ukraine		2020-03-17	2020-04-24	38																						38	National
United Arab Emirates		2020-03-26	2020-04-17	22																						22	National
United Kingdom	England	2020-03-23	2020-07-04	103	2020-11-05	2020-12-02	27	2021-01-05	2021-03-28 (Note: England has followed an incremental easing of restrictions since 8 March 2021. Most lockdown restrictions were lifted between March and June, July 19 is the date set for the expiry of most legal restrictions in England. Although some sources describe this date as the "end" of lockdown, March 28 was the date in which the "stay at home orders" were ended. This fits the most internationally accepted definition of what constitutes a lockdown.)	83																213	National
United Kingdom	Scotland	2020-03-23	2020-06-29	98	2020-12-26	2021-04-02	97																			195	National
United Kingdom	Northern Ireland	2020-03-23	2020-07-03	102	2020-11-27	2020-12-11	14	2020-12-26	2021-04-12	107																223	Country
United Kingdom	Wales	2020-03-23	2020-07-13	112	2020-10-23	2020-11-09	17	2020-12-20	2021-03-13 (Note: Most lockdown restrictions were lifted between March and June. March 13 was the date in which the "stay at home orders" were ended. This fits the most internationally accepted definition of what constitutes a lockdown.)	83																212	Country
United Kingdom	North West	2020-12-31	2021-03-29	88																						88	Region
United Kingdom	North East	2020-12-31	2021-03-29	88																						88	Region
United Kingdom	East Midlands	2020-12-31	2021-03-29	88																						88	Region
United Kingdom	West Midlands	2020-12-31	2021-03-29	88																						88	Region
United Kingdom	Norfolk	2020-12-26	2021-03-29	93																						93	County
United Kingdom	Suffolk	2020-12-26	2021-03-29	93																						93	County
United Kingdom	Cambridgeshire	2020-12-26	2021-03-29	93																						93	County
United Kingdom	Essex	2020-12-26	2021-03-29	93																						93	County
United Kingdom	London area	2020-12-20	2021-03-29	99																						99	City
United Kingdom	Kent & South East	2020-12-20	2021-03-29	99																						99	Region
United Kingdom	Leicester	2020-06-30	2020-07-24	24																						24	County
United Kingdom	Glasgow				2020-11-20	2020-12-11	21																			21	County
United Kingdom	East Renfrewshire				2020-11-20	2020-12-11	21																			21	County
United Kingdom	Renfrewshire				2020-11-20	2020-12-11	21																			21	County
United Kingdom	East Dunbartonshire				2020-11-20	2020-12-11	21																			21	County
United Kingdom	West Dunbartonshire				2020-11-20	2020-12-11	21																			21	County
United Kingdom	North Lanarkshire				2020-11-20	2020-12-11	21																			21	County
United Kingdom	South Lanarkshire				2020-11-20	2020-12-11	21																			21	County
United Kingdom	East Ayrshire				2020-11-20	2020-12-11	21																			21	County
United Kingdom	South Ayrshire				2020-11-20	2020-12-11	21																			21	County
United Kingdom	West Lothian				2020-11-20	2020-12-11	21																			21	County
United Kingdom	Stirling				2020-11-20	2020-12-11	21																			21	County
United States	California	2020-03-19	2021-06-15	453																						453	State
United States	Connecticut	2020-03-23	2020-04-22	30																						30	State
United States	Illinois	2020-03-21	2020-05-30	70																						70	State
United States	Kansas City in Kansas	2020-03-24	2020-04-19	26																						26	City
United States	Massachusetts	2020-03-24	2020-05-04	41																						41	State
United States	Michigan	2020-03-24	2020-04-13	20																						20	State
United States	New York	2020-03-22	2020-06-13	83																						83	State
United States	Oregon	2020-03-24	2020-05-15	53																						53	State
United States	Wisconsin	2020-03-24	2020-05-13	50																						50	State
Venezuela		2020-03-17	2020-05-13	57																						57	National
Vietnam	Nationwide	2020-04-01	2020-04-22	21																						21	National
Vietnam	Da Nang			21	2020-07-28	2020-09-05	39																			60	City
Vietnam	Hai Duong			21	2021-02-16	2021-03-02	14																			35	Province, Chi Linh city lockdown began from 28 January.
Vietnam	Bac Ninh			21	2021-05-18		23																			23	4 districts and 1 city
Vietnam	Bac Giang			21	2021-05-18		23																			23	6 districts
Zimbabwe		2020-03-30	2020-05-02	33																						33	National
Notes

In the table, pandemic lockdowns are defined as the shutdown of parts of the economy, due to non-pharmaceutical anti-pandemic measures and enforceable by law like:

- Closing of schools and kindergartens
- Closing of non-essential shops (shops and stores apart from food, doctors and drug stores)
- Closing of non-essential production
- Cancellation of recreational venues and closing of public places
- Curfews
- Stay-at-home orders and total movement control

These measures caused the COVID-19 recession in 2020. The table does not contain:

- Measures with smaller economic impacts like:
  - border closures
  - social distancing measures and social movement restrictions
  - travel restrictions.
- Other non-pharmaceutical anti-pandemic measures like mandatory quarantines after travel, self quarantine and social distancing measures
- Any measures which are voluntary rather than enforceable by law

The pandemic resulted in the largest number of shutdowns worldwide at the same time in history. By 26 March, 1.7 billion people worldwide were under some form of lockdown, which increased to 3.9 billion people by the first week of April – more than half of the world's population. Lockdowns affected 93% of workers worldwide. 30% lived in nations with complete workplace closures, save for critical businesses, and 42% in countries with partial closures. Nearly 20% lived in nations with recommended but not compulsory workplace shutdown.

Major restrictions first began in China, with other countries in East Asia like Vietnam soon implementing widespread containment measures. Much of Europe, North America and Africa took much longer to bring in tough measures. Restrictions on travel between and activity within nations were of varying stringency.

By mid April, nearly 300 million people, or about 90% of the population, were under some form of lockdown in the United States, with around 100 million in the Philippines and about 59 million in South Africa, while around 1.3 billion were under lockdown in India, which was the largest of all lockdowns.

By the end of April, around 300 million people were under lockdown in various countries of Europe, including but not limited to Italy, Spain, France, and the United Kingdom; while around 200 million people were under lockdown in Latin America. In Germany, 35% of workers worked from home in addition to their regular on-site duties, while 26% worked from home exclusively.

== Variation by countries and territories ==
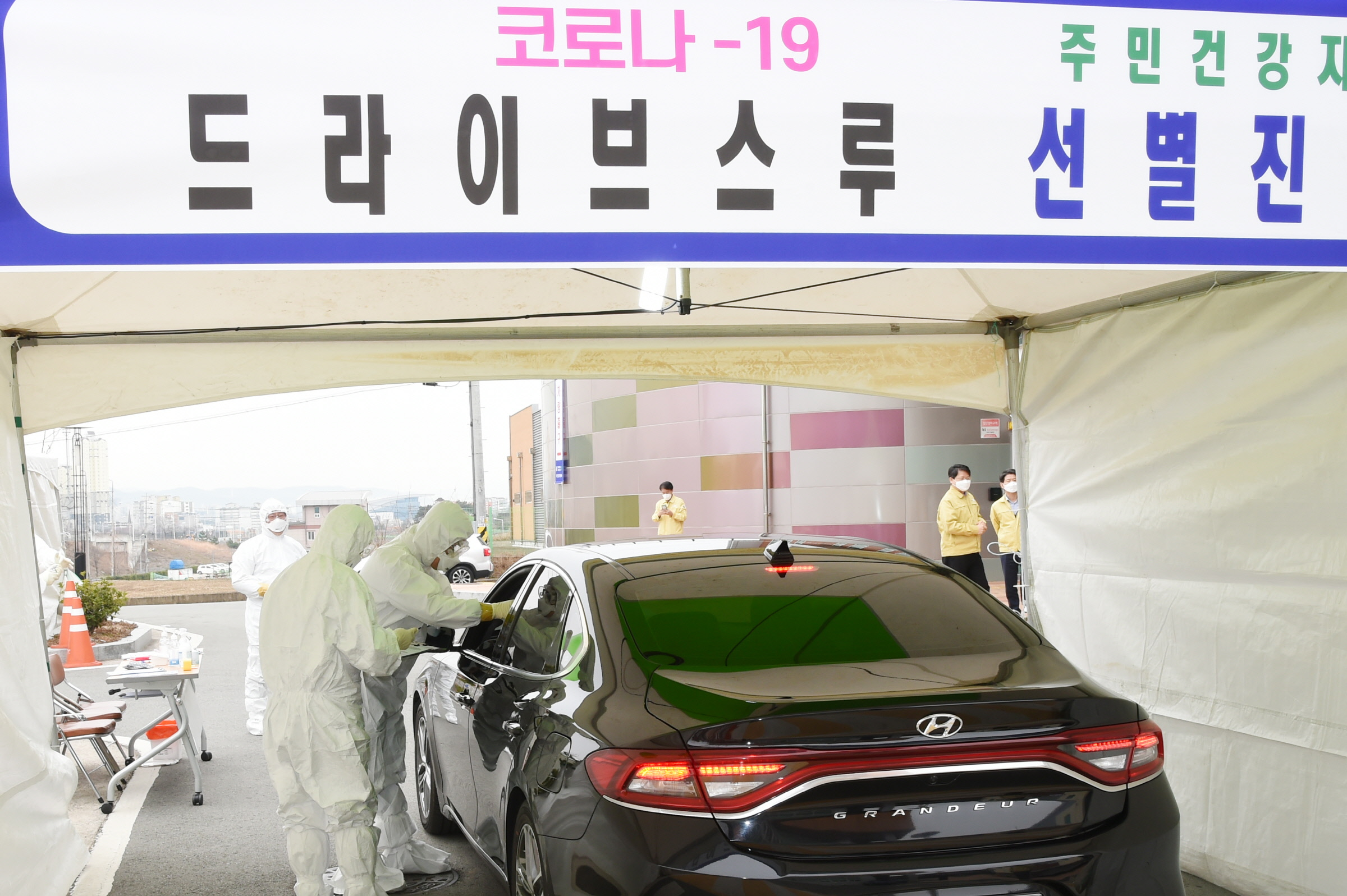
A drive through COVID-19 testing site in South Korea in February 2020. South Korea did not implement any lockdown measures; its K-Quarantine strategy included rapidly developing mass testing capacity and infrastructure.

Countries and territories around the world enforced lockdowns of varying stringency in response to the COVID-19 pandemic.

This included total movement control while others enforced restrictions based on time. In many cases, only essential businesses were allowed to remain open. Schools, universities and colleges closed either on a nationwide or local basis in 63 countries, affecting approximately 47 percent of the world's student population.

Beginning with the first lockdown in China's Hubei province and nationwide in Italy in March 2020, lockdowns continued to be implemented in many countries throughout 2020 and 2021. On 24 March 2020, the entire 1.3 billion population of India was ordered to stay at home during its lockdown, making it the largest of the pandemic. The world's longest continuous lockdown lasting 234 days took place in Buenos Aires, Argentina, in 2020. As of October 2021, the city of Melbourne, Australia, and certain cities in Peru and Chile spent the most cumulative days in lockdown over separate periods, although measures varied between these countries.

A few countries and territories did not use the strategy, including Japan, Belarus, Nicaragua, Sweden, South Korea, Hong Kong, Taiwan, Tanzania, Uruguay, two states in Brazil (Roraima and Rondônia) and certain United States states.

== See also ==
- Cordon sanitaire (medicine)
- Flattening the curve
- List of species named after the COVID-19 pandemic (including lockdowns)
- National responses to the COVID-19 pandemic
- Preventive action
- Stay-at-home order
- Timeline of the COVID-19 pandemic
