= Impact of the COVID-19 pandemic on domestic violence =

Aspect of viral outbreak

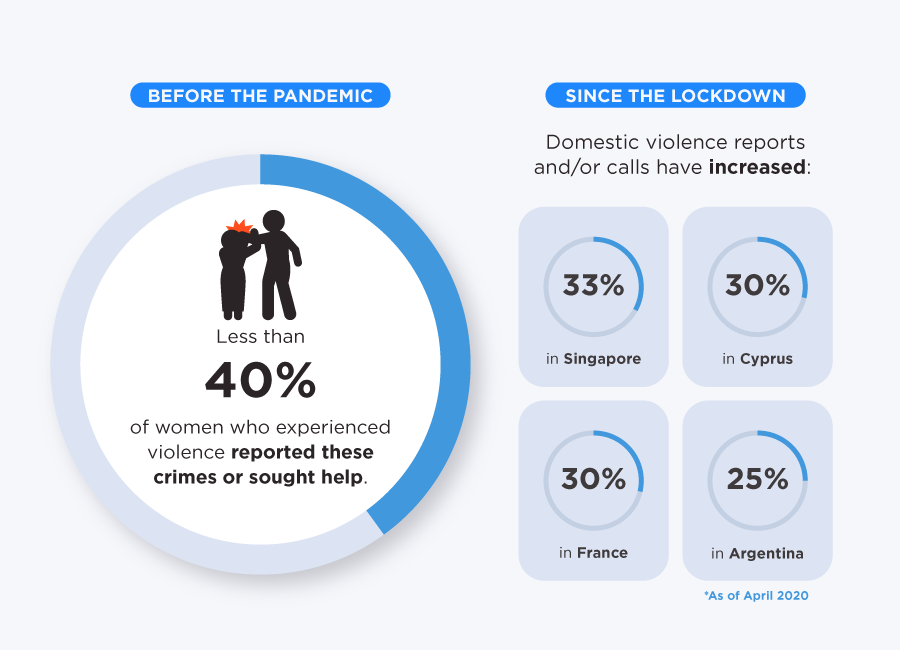
Domestic violence before the pandemic and since the lockdown

Amid the COVID-19 pandemic, many countries reported an increase in domestic violence and intimate partner violence. United Nations Secretary-General António Guterres, noting the "horrifying global surge", called for a domestic violence "ceasefire". UN Women stated that COVID-19 created "conditions for abuse that are ideal for abusers because it forced people into lockdown" thus causing a "shadow pandemic" that exacerbated preexisting issues with domestic violence globally.

Domestic violence and sexual exploitation, which was already an epidemic around the world, spiked when households were placed under the increased strains that come from security, health and money worries, and cramped and confined living conditions. Prior to the lockdowns, it was estimated that one in three women will experience violence during their lifetimes, a human rights violation that also bears an economic cost of US$1.5 trillion. Due to lockdowns many of these women were now trapped at home with their abusers and were at increased risk of other forms of violence as overloaded healthcare systems and disrupted justice services struggle to respond. Women, especially essential and informal workers, such as doctors, nurses and street vendors, were at heightened risk of violence as they navigated deserted urban or rural public spaces and transportation services under lockdown.

More domestic violence helplines and shelters around the world reported rising calls for help. In a number of countries, domestic violence reports and emergency calls surged upwards of 25 per cent since social distancing measures were enacted. Such numbers were believed to reflect only the worst cases. In Argentina, Canada, France, Germany, Spain, the United Kingdom, and the United States, government authorities, women's rights activists and civil society partners flagged increasing reports of domestic violence during the crisis, and heightened demand for emergency shelter. The European Parliament issued a press release addressing the issue, writing "we won't leave Europe's women alone", and asked member states to increase support to domestic violence victims during the pandemic.

== Background ==
Pandemics, financial insecurity, stress and uncertainty have led to increased aggression at home, which was seen previously with the 2008 financial crisis and natural disasters such as the 2011 Christchurch earthquake, with abusers able to control large amounts of their victims' daily lives. Domestic violence also increases whenever families spend more time together, such as during Christmas vacations. As stated by the French Secretary of Equality Marlene Schiappa, "Confinement is a breeding ground for domestic abuse."

== Impact on ability to access help ==
Prior to the lockdowns, less than 40 percent of the women who experienced violence sought help of any sort. Now, quarantine and movement restrictions further serve to isolate many women trapped with their abusers from friends, families and other support networks. And, the closure of non-essential businesses means that work no longer provides respite for many survivors and heightened economic insecurity makes it more difficult for them to leave. For those who do manage to reach out, overstretched health, social, judicial and police services are struggling to respond as resources are diverted to deal with the pandemic.

== Situation by country ==
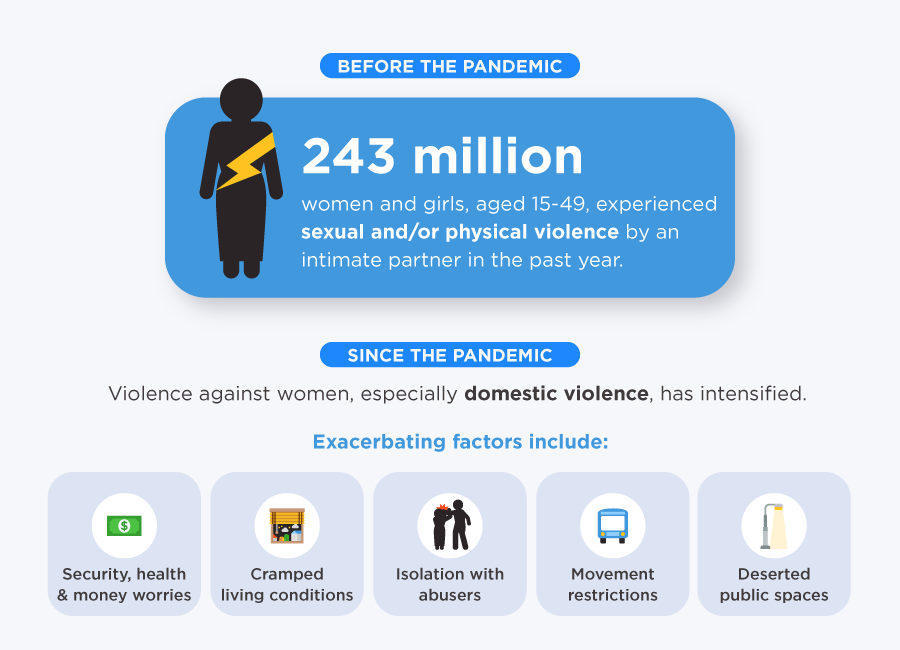
Violence against women, especially domestic violence has intensified during the pandemic

=== Albania ===
In Albania, 245 cases of violence against women were reported in March, with 89 prosecutions, 33 arrests and 141 protection orders issued. As opposed to many countries, the number of domestic violence reports decreased by 141 as compared to the same month the previous year. The number of reports might be higher, however, as lockdown restrictions make reporting more difficult. Roma women in Albania seem to be particularly affected. Many of them experience increased domestic violence and are not able to report because they are afraid, do not own a mobile phone, or cannot leave their house.

=== Argentina ===
During the 120 first days of lockdown, the Domestic Violence Bureau (dependent on the Supreme Court) received 1280 reports of intrafamily violence. The number of women killed reached a 10-year high during the COVID-19 lockdown.

Calls to the 144 emergency phone number for gender violence increased 28% year-on-year on a nationwide level, 48% in the capital city Buenos Aires, 35% in the Buenos Aires Province, and 10% in the Salta Province.

=== Australia ===
The Australian government announced that Google searches for domestic violence help had increased by 75% more than normal. The Western Australia Police reported a 5 percent increase in domestic violence reports compared to the year prior. A report from the Gender and COVID-19 Working Group stated that of 400 frontline workers polled, some 40 percent reported an increase in calls for help, and 70 percent saw an increase in the complexity of the cases.

=== Belgium ===
On 23 March 2020, the Flemish Helpline (Vlaamse Hulplijn, phone number 1712) stated that many police zones and parquets in Belgium reported a rise in familial violence after the country entered lockdown on 12 March. On 7 April, the Flemish Helpline reported a 70% rise in calls for help in the third week of lockdown (week 16) compared to the first week (week 14); the calls involved almost double the number of (potential) victims of violence.

Citing the reported surge in domestic violence in China and France and anecdotal evidence from Belgian online abuse help services, Ghent University announced on 13 April 2020 it was launching a national investigation into domestic violence to assess the extent of the problem, stating that it feared a 'domestic violence crisis' and wanted to inform and warn politicians and healthcare workers. Additionally, a number of girls and women living in Brussels claimed that since the beginning of the lockdown there had been a severe rise in incidents of street harassment, presumably due to sexual frustration; they accused the police – who could not confirm an increase in cases – of not doing enough to safeguard public security and deal with the perpetrators.

=== Canada ===
In Canada, women and children are facing obstacles in accessing social services as services have transitioned to offering services remotely. Both the severity and frequency of domestic violence have risen across the country since March 2020. This rise is a result of stress from the COVID-19 pandemic, the lockdowns, fractures in the judicial system, and reduced social supports for families. The lockdown during the COVID-19 pandemic has left many women unable to exercise independence, as many are losing their source of income or public identity, along with increased burdens of a child or elder care caused by the shut-down of many physical venues. Maryam Monsef, Canada's Minister for Women and Gender Equality, has cited an increase in gender-based violence of 20-30% in some areas in Canada as a result of the COVID-19 lockdown measures. Canadian victim services across the country were impacted due to a lack of accessibility to required resources to aid their clients as they shifted to working remotely with the onset of the COVID-19 pandemic, which includes accessibility to legal aid and housing, access to medical aid, and mental health services. British Columbia's Battered Women crisis line reported a doubling of calls in March 2020 compared to March 2019, and a tripling from April 2019 to April 2020, followed by levelling off to 2019 levels through the summer as lockdown restrictions eased. In Toronto, the Assault Women's Hotline answered 55,000 calls between March and September 2020. However, an additional 11,630 did not get through or were dropped before connecting.

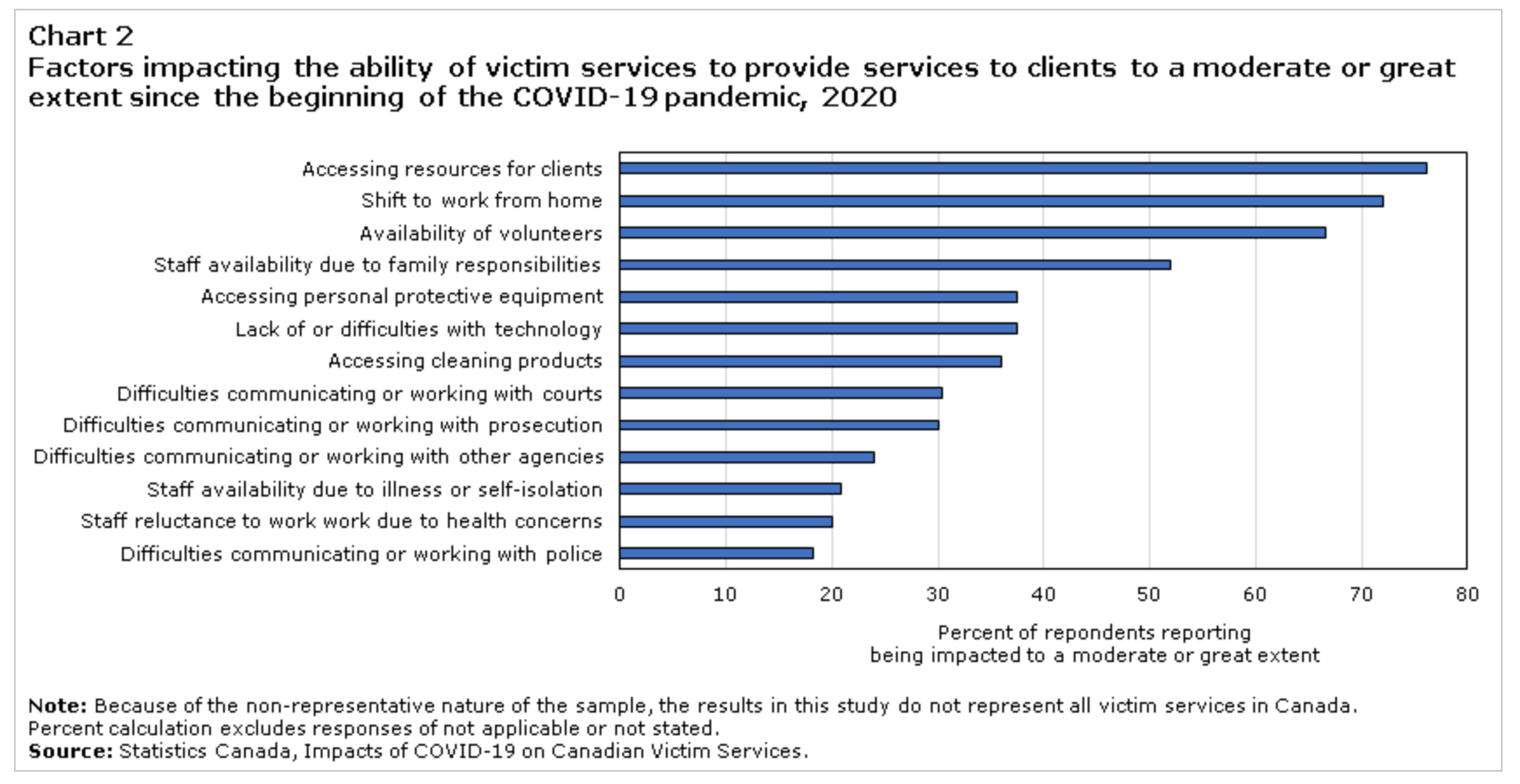
Factors Impacting Canadians' Ability to Access Victim Services Since the Beginning of COVID-19

COVID-19 has exacerbated the availability of safe places of refuge for these women and children. There has been a lack of emergency shelter for women both before and during COVID-19. The Ontario Association of Interval and Transition Housing has seen a significant increase in the number of women reaching out for help during the COVID-19 lockdowns, and they suspect that many more are unable to reach out due to quarantining with their domestic-abuser, meaning they cannot be alone to make a phone call. The most dangerous time for a woman in an abusive relationship is when they attempt to leave. Canada included 50M CAD as part of its COVID-19 aid package to support shelters for those facing gender-based violence (GBV) and sexual assault. A 2020 report from Women's Shelters Canada says this funding is still inadequate. Many shelters still raise their own funding to cover staff salaries and other operating costs. In Manitoba, women's shelters receive fewer calls than previously. 1 in 4 Canadian women reports increased anxiety levels, and 1 in 5 reports feeling depressed most of the time as a result of increased tension and violence at home. These heightened rates are expected to continue beyond the length of the COVID-19 lockdowns as the dynamic in the household is fundamentally altered.

=== China ===
Jingzhou-based anti-domestic violence activist and retired police officer Wan Fei told Sixth Tone on 2 March 2020 that the number of domestic violence cases reported to a nearby police station had tripled in February 2020 compared to February 2019. "According to our statistics, 90% of the causes of violence are related to the COVID-19 epidemic," he said, citing quarantine anxiety, economic insecurity and weakened victim support networks as factors.

In the Hubei province of China, domestic violence reports to police more than tripled compared to the previous year, jumping from 47 cases in February 2019 to 162 cases in February 2020. 26-year-old Lele from Anhui province said that she had already faced abuse by her husband for six years, but the COVID-19 lockdown made it far worse; in a 1 March escalation, he repeatedly hit her with a chair and wholly bruised her legs while she was holding their 11-month-old daughter.

=== Colombia ===
On the first day of the nationwide lockdown for Colombia; 24 March, a man shot his wife, her sister and mother dead inside of their home in an apparent femicide attack. The mayor of the capital city Bogota reported that in the first week of lockdown the only crime statistic to not lower was domestic violence, which surged 225%. The leader of Colombia's Femicide Observatory, which tracks the killing of women, cited an increase in neighborhood reporting and the use of hashtags like #FeminicidioEsPandemia and #ViolenciaDeGenero.

=== Cyprus ===
Helplines in Cyprus have registered an increase in calls by more than 30 per cent. In Australia, 40 per cent of frontline workers in a New South Wales survey reported increased requests for help with violence that was escalating in intensity.

=== Denmark ===
At the start of the corona crisis, staff at women's shelters expressed concern that the number of women seeking shelter would rise, and on this basis, the government stepped up appropriations for the shelters. However, the expected rise in demand has not come true; instead, there are fewer women seeking shelter than before. However, some information on the situation is self-contradictory. There has, however, been a rise in men that have become homeless because of conflicts in relation to the corona crisis, and men's shelters are too small land few to meet the demand. In spite of this, the government does not give increased grants to men's shelters. A number of psychotherapists report that during the corona crisis, in some couples, the relationship deteriorates, but in many couples, the relationship improves, because partners have more time to talk together and talk with their kids.

=== Fiji ===
The Fiji Women's Crisis Centre received an increase number of domestic violence cases during the lockdowns with the national domestic violence helpline receiving over 500 calls in April. Also, the Ministry of Women, Children and Poverty Alleviation recorded more than 1000 assault cases against women. In response, the government of Fiji formed the COVID-19 Response Gender Working Group to advance prevention and response to violence against women and girls and also to formulate policies and programs that are not gender-blind.

=== France ===
In the first week of its lockdown, France saw a 32% rise in areas policed by the National Gendarmerie (rural and suburban areas) in relation to domestic violence. By 26 March this figure had increased to 36% in Paris. In response, the government introduced the possibility for female victims to call for help at pharmacies, and mandated the police to be on high alert for domestic violence during the lockdown.

=== Germany ===
Exact figures of how sharply the rate of domestic violence had risen in Germany were not yet available as of 2 April 2020, but help organisations commented that it appeared to be "Christmas squared", noting that domestic violence normally also peaked during Christmas, but that the current situation was far worse. More recent information is that the rate of domestic violence has gone down in all parts of Germany or at least has not risen. For instance, in Nordrhein-Westphalen, the number of cases of domestic violence in March 2020 was 28% lower than in March 2018 and 2019.

=== India ===
India's National Commission for Women (NCW) has seen a more than twofold rise in gender-based violence during the lockdown in India. Between 23 March and 16 April NCW registered 587 domestic violence complaints, a ~45% increase from the previous 25 days. Factors compounding the situation include the confinement, financial worries due to the lockdown, and lack of access to alcohol. The virus mirrored the pre-existing patriarchal notions and magnified the discrimination and pre-existing inequalities. There has also been a threefold rise in police apathy towards women complaints, with the police busy with lockdown orders. Indian women rights activist Kavita Krishnan said that women told her that had the Indian government given a warning about the lockdown, they could have tried moving to safer locations in time.

The Childline India helpline received more than 92,000 calls between 20 and 31 March, the start of India's lockdown, asking for protection from abuse and violence. The extended confinement has also trapped children with their abusers at home.

=== Ireland ===
The Irish Police received a large increase in the number of calls regarding domestic abuse, with some victims stating they had to flee to their car to call for help. The charity Woman's Aid chief Sarah Benson told reporters that the trend that she had seen was the threat and dangers of the virus being used to manipulate and abuse the victims. Safe Ireland's Chief Executive echoed this stating that the virus was being weaponised against them, with some victims stating that they hadn't realized how bad it was until now. Twenty-one of the women's refuges in the State were full in March, with some victims and their children being moved into AirBnB's to allow for social distancing.

=== Israel ===
ERAN, a nonprofit organization which handles domestic abuse and other calls on its telephone hotline and by email, reported a 35.8 percent increase in domestic violence-related calls between March and May 2020 compared to three months prior. Protests were held in Israeli cities in May to bring attention to the murder of five women in a seven-week period since the government imposed lockdowns to stop the spread of the virus. When the government first called for citizens to stay home in March, women's shelters were reported as close to full capacity, both due to new arrivals and to current residents who stayed in the shelters because of the lockdowns.

=== Italy ===
In Italy, there has been a steep fall in calls to domestic violence helplines. Another support group in France has seen the same trend of drop in calls. This may be attributed to women finding it difficult to ask from help during the confinement of a lockdown. As Time magazine reports: "mandatory lockdowns ... have trapped them in their homes with their abusers, isolated from the people and the resources that could help them".

=== Jordan ===
A video post by a woman in Jordan went viral as she documented the abuse she had suffered due to her mother and siblings, before the Jordanian Women's Union removed her and her son from the home.

=== Luxembourg ===
There is no information that the incidence of domestic violence should have risen.

=== Mexico ===
At least one organization; Brujas del Mar, with help from social media networks to bolster digital aids or create new ones for women. Essential women workers, have been offered digital accompaniment and tracking services for those who have to walk to places alone. A Mexico City organization Gendes, has focused on working with males instead using a new hotline to talk down men from becoming violent instead of their in-person anti-machismo therapy.

=== Netherlands ===
My dad has been name-calling and
yelling at my little sister all evening...
It's much worse now that
we're so much together...

— Dutch child seeking help

The Atria Institute on gender equality and women's history stated in late March that "in times of crisis – like natural disasters, wars and epidemics – the risk of gender-based violence increases," and noted that the National Network Safely Home (Landelijk Netwerk Veilig Thuis, LNVT) was wary of a rise in new violent incidents in the Netherlands. The Children's Telephone (Kindertelefoon), a Dutch non-profit organisation helping children (anonymously) to deal with various problems, reported a 50 percent surge in calls – most of them related to domestic and sexual abuse and violence – in the 2 weeks after the Netherlands entered into a semi-lockdown in mid-March.

On 31 March, online help services Sterk Huis and Fier reported a rise in people contacting them through chat due in tensions and verbal escalations at home (Fier noted a 20% rise in conversations and double the number of domestic violence incidents occurring in March compared to January and February 2020); on the other hand, Safely Home had not yet registered a significant rise, and the National Police even noted a 12% decline compared to the same week in 2019. That same day, however, the Central Netherlands Police region did note a rise in domestic quarrels, violence and child abuse incidents due to increased tensions in the preceding weeks, and called on people to stay vigilant and always keep reporting signals of domestic violence and child abuse.

=== New Zealand ===
A New Zealand based charity, Victim Support, saw an increase of family based violence such as siblings against siblings, grandparents stressed about child care, spousal abuse and teenagers fighting with parents during New Zealand's national lockdown. On Good Friday, New Zealand Police reported a 20 percent spike in cases on the first Sunday after the lockdown was announced on 29 March, comparative to the past three weeks. A spike in cases during the lockdown was also reported by the New Zealand Women's Refuge.

=== Pakistan ===
Mental health professionals in Pakistan reported that cases of domestic abuse had risen in the country during lockdown. Ministry of Human Rights also set up a National Domestic Abuse Helpline. National Disaster Management Authority of Pakistan has set up a dedicated "Gender and Child Cell" to deal with domestic abuse cases.

While the healthcare system struggles to cope with the rising number of instances of COVID-19, funding for domestic violence interventions have been reduced, with the majority of provincial social welfare helplines being closed. During the lockdown in March 2020, 399 women's murder cases were recorded in Khyber Pakhtunkhwa, but only 25 calls to the police hotline were received.

According to NGO Sustainable Social Development Organization, reported rapes and sexual assaults by family members soared as much as 400% quarter on quarter during the COVID-19 lockdown, due to Covid restrictions forcing children to remain indoors thus allowing relatives to more frequently abuse them.

=== Russia ===
Tracking the number of domestic violence cases and helping those involved has provided difficult due to the issue that domestic violence has been decriminalized in the country since 2017. However, it is believed that through independent research that the countries domestic violence hotline has increased by at least one fourth in a month, with other regions seeing it grow by more. Some of the few shelters in Russia have closed their doors and are not offering services but some have shifted to have a more online user based function.

=== Singapore ===
Helplines in Singapore have registered an increase in calls by more than 30 per cent. In Australia, 40 per cent of frontline workers in a New South Wales survey reported increased requests for help with violence that was escalating in intensity.

=== Spain ===
If an abuser wants to use
a machete or other weapon
against you while locked down,
there will be casualties.
Casualties awaiting a grim fate.

— Mercè Ordovas, advocate

Spain's domestic violence helpline noted a 47% increase in calls in the first two weeks of April compared to the same period in 2019, while the number of women contacting essential support services via email or social media reportedly increased by 700%. However, there was a simultaneous sharp drop in domestic violence complaints to the police, which officials and activists attributed to the fact that people were strictly required to stay indoors except to get food and medicine, meaning that victims were isolated from family and people around them who could provide them support to bring a formal complaint in normal circumstances.

Female domestic violence victims advocate Mercè Ordovas said that the strict requirement to stay at home prevented them from meeting potential supporters and enabled perpetrators to constantly surveil their victims and obstructed them from making calls. Lawyer Carmen Valenzuela pointed out that lodging a complaint initiated a complicated legal process, with victims having to leave the house and going to the police station and the next day to the court while risking exposure to COVID-19 and having to justify why they violated the curfew, further complicated by either having to take any children with them or leaving them behind with their abuser.

=== Switzerland ===
While statistics are not available in 2020 to measure precisely the impact of COVID on domestic violence in Switzerland, there are concerns about the risks of raising risks and Alain Berset, interior minister Alain Berset participated to the European Union Conference on Gender Equality. The figures were on the rise for 2019 already.

According to Väter ohne rechte representing the rights of fathers, the incidence of domestic violence has not risen, and in some places there is a reduction

=== Tunisia ===
Tunisian Women's Affairs Minister Asma Shiri announced that there was a rising number of domestic violence incidents in result to the governments efforts to stop the virus.

=== Turkey ===
Activists in Turkey have reported that the killing of women has risen sharply since the first stay-at-home order was issued on 11 March with at least 12 women killed between the stay-at-home order and the end of the month. The head of the Turkish Federation of Women's Associations echoed these comments, stating that the emergency hotlines had a surge of callers amid the outbreak, with physical and psychological abuse being the most identified.

One study found a negative relationship between stay-at-home orders and femicides in Turkey. Specifically, the study reported that fewer women were killed by intimate partners in cities that experienced a lockdown during the COVID-19 pandemic. According to the authors, "one driver of decline is the inability of ex-partners to reach victims under curfews... We do not find any impact on female homicides by other perpetrator types."

=== United Kingdom ===
On 28 March Leicestershire Police warned about a rise in domestic violence due to the corona crisis, saying that survivors were now facing long-term isolation in their houses with their abusers, while health concerns and job losses caused others to experience abuse for the first time. On 30 March world champion boxer Billy Joe Saunders had his licence suspended by the British Boxing Board of Control after filming and sharing a video that promoted domestic violence. In it, he used a punchbag to demonstrate how men could hit their female partners for "giving you mouth" during the shutdown.

Refuge, a charity concerned with domestic violence, said on 6 April that calls to its helpline had risen by 25 percent since restrictions began and that hits on its website had increased by 150 percent. A few days later Refuge reported a 700 percent increase in calls in a single day. Additionally, the Respect charity reported a rise of 16.6% in the number of calls concerning domestic violence against men.

=== United States ===
While reporting abuse on the National Domestic Violence Hotline, 951 callers between 10 and 24 March 2022 mentioned COVID-19. One caller said that "she was being kept home against her will after being threatened by her abuser with a hammer and an unregistered gun"; he was reportedly "using the pandemic as an excuse to stop her from leaving him".

Of 22 law enforcement agencies polled by NBC News in early April 2020, 18 stated that they had seen a rise of reports in the previous month. Houston saw an increase of 20 percent, Charlotte-Mecklenburg saw an 18 percent increase, and Phoenix police saw a jump of 6 percent. Some places such as New York City have seen a decrease in the number of reported incidents, although police believe the severe lockdown and concern about the virus have led to some underreporting by the victims. On 11 April 2020, Georgia governor Brian Kemp referred to an Atlanta hospital report that noted a "15% increase of domestic violence cases in their facilities." Local media, hospitals, police and advocates were unable to verify the claim but said that the figure was realistic and would fit in with the anecdotal evidence they had been receiving in recent weeks and the increased risk of domestic violence that the lockdown situation posed.

The Marshall Project investigated the situation in three cities – Chicago, Austin and Chandler (Arizona) – and found that the number of reported cases of domestic violence had gone down in all three due to victims being less likely to report abuse or ask for help during the pandemic.

=== Venezuela ===
The director of a feminist research organization Ladysmith, stated that their WhatsApp hotline for Venezuela migrant women had gained in use, with many of the victims referencing the quarantine conditions hindering their ability to leave.

== Displaced people ==
Displaced populations in crowded refugee camps, and reported domestic violence has tripled recently in some countries practicing social distancing. As the lockdowns take a foothold, we are witnessing increased rates of gender-based violence in public spaces in addition to domestic violence.

== Projections of future rates of domestic violence ==
In the immediate term, the largest contributor is likely to come from the effects of stay-at-home orders and movement restrictions, which could increase women's exposure to violent partners. Mounting household tensions and economic stresses could also play a role. There are already indications that violence incidence is indeed growing, including increases in calls to violence prevention hotlines and media reports of rising domestic abuse and homicide. Projections by UNFPA show that if violence increases by 20 per cent during periods of lockdown, there would be an additional 15 million cases of intimate partner violence in 2020 for an average lockdown duration of 3 months, 31 million cases for an average lockdown of 6 months, 45 million for an average lockdown of 9 months, and 61 million if the average lockdown period were to be as long as one year.

== Response ==
=== Governments ===
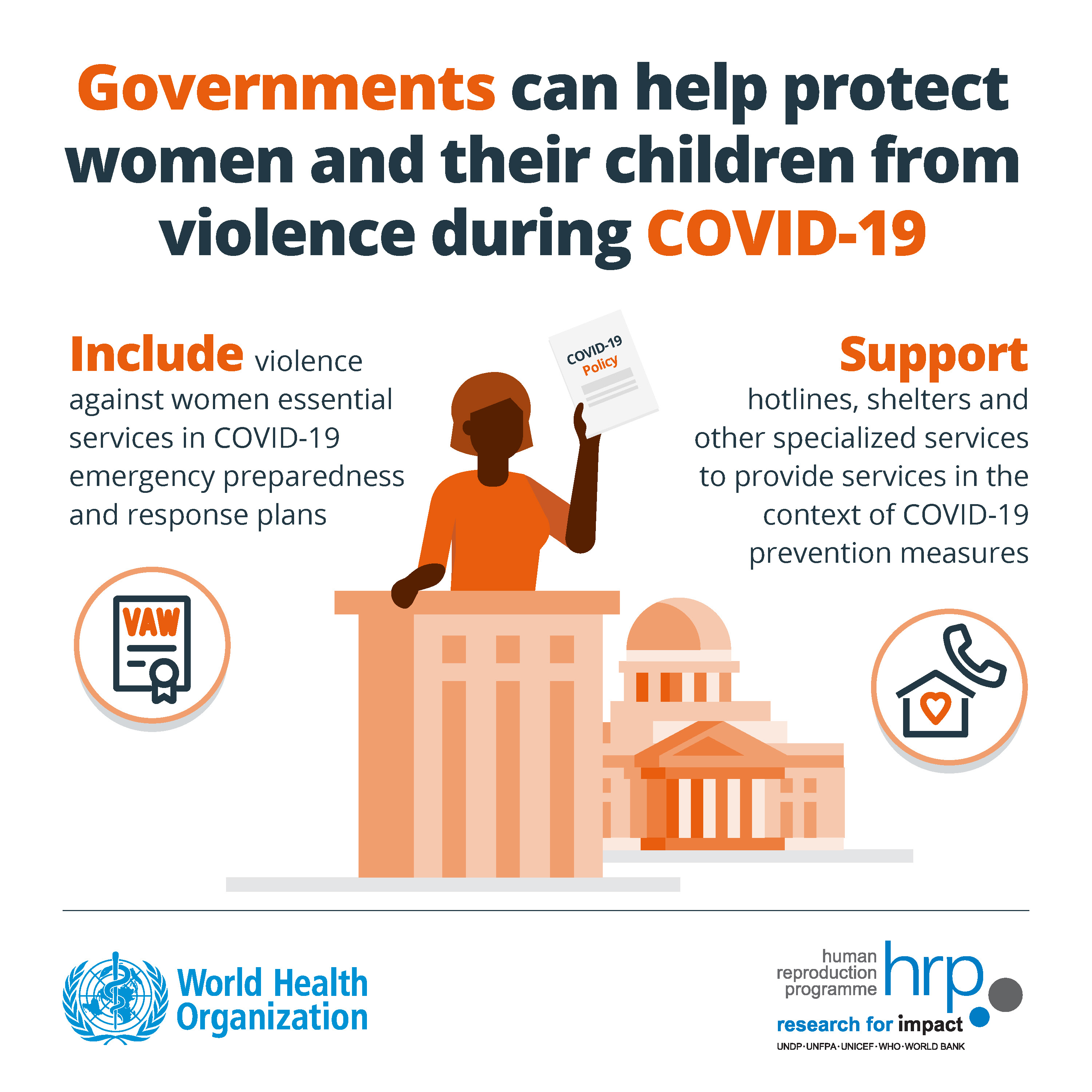
A poster from the World Health Organization showing ways by which governments can help protect women from domestic violence

Governments have come up with new ways to tackle domestic violence in the times of restriction imposed due to lockdowns during the coronavirus pandemic. Italy has launched an app that allows asking for help without the need to make a phone call. The French government has launched an initiative to help victims by new hotlines and a website for resources, along with implementing code words to tell Pharmacy staff after learning of the program from Spain and the Canary Islands. Western Australia has created a COVID-19 Family and Domestic Violence Task force with the Department of Communities to work with the police force and service providers to ensure the continuation of services, allowed courts to impose electronic monitoring on offenders and raised penalty amounts.

External videos
- StillHere Domestic Abuse Awareness Campaign TV Advert – Ireland
- Domestic Abuse Advertisement – Scotland

In April the Irish Police launched 'Operation Faoisimh' which was described as a proactive initiative to ensure victims are supported and protected during the virus. Separately the county's Department of Justice announced that it was allocating €160,000 to community and voluntary groups to support their work and made a series TV, radio and social media ads to try and reach victims.

The Scottish Government relaunched its previous awareness campaign against domestic abuse on 10 April 2020, with Justice Secretary Humza Yousaf emphasising that victims can call on police and support services round the clock, even during the crisis, and they do not have to wait until the crisis is over. A government advertisement released on the same day was more emphatic: 'Don't delay in seeking help during the current coronavirus situation.'

In India, the National Commission for Women relaunched a WhatsApp number for the duration of the lockdown. This would allow women to contact them for help related to domestic violence through messages. One in every six new complaints during the lockdown has been made over this WhatsApp number. Odisha Police has launched a drive to contact and ascertain the status of all previous cases of domestic violence in the state. In Pune, perpetrators of domestic violence with will be institutionally quarantined. Three Indian agencies related to women's welfare will conduct an anti-domestic violence drive similar to the Breakthrough's "Bell Bajao" or "Ring the Bell" campaign".

The Flemish Government's Minister of Family Affairs Wouter Beke decided on 7 April to increase subsidies for the Flemish Helpline 'to strengthen the operation and capacity of the helpline during this crisis and to carry out a targeted campaign to encourage victims, bystanders and perpetrators of violence to take the step towards assistance.' In late April, Flemish Justice Minister Zuhal Demir concluded a deal with a hotel chain to provide extra temporary shelters for victims of domestic violence in now-empty hotelrooms, as just about all permanent shelters were full. She also invested 280,000 euros in hiring additional coordination personnel for the domestic violence intervention teams in Flanders' five provinces. Similarly, the French Government invested 1 million euros in establishing 20 new help centres throughout the country located near supermarkets, where victims can go while going out for groceries, and be redirected to dozens of hotel rooms that functioned as temporary shelters paid for by the government. Several municipalities of Germany had also started to rent empty hotels for accommodating victims of domestic violence by 2 April 2020.

In the Canary Islands, the regional government and pharmacies launched a scheme whereby a woman can request a "Mask-19" (Spanish: Mascarilla-19, a code word meaning she urgently needs help with a domestic violence situation) to a pharmacist, who can then call the police for them. The Mascarilla-19 scheme has since spread to other regions of Spain and other countries, such as France.

=== Individuals and charities ===
Patricia Carranza calling on neighbours to intervene

Rihanna privately donated US$2.1 million to the Mayor's Fund for Los Angeles to assist victims of domestic violence affected by the lockdowns, with her charity; Clara Lionel Foundation joining with Twitter CEO Jack Dorsey to match donations to the drive. Some shelter organizations such as Center for Domestic Peace in San Rafael, California have attempted to secure emergency funding to help the women and children in their care.

Citizens in Argentina used their balconies to bang pots and hang green and purple handkerchiefs to represent abortion rights and Ni Una Menos to express outrage over machismo violence and in support of the potential and known victims.

Seville resident Patricia Carranza, her mother and her little brother were victims of domestic violence by their father until they managed to flee when Patricia was 8. When her mother sent her an emotional audio message on 15 March about how bad she felt about all domestic violence victims that were now locked down with their abusers, Patricia recorded and spread a video calling not only on all victims to not remain silent and speak out about what was happening and call for help, but primarily for their neighbours, who were closest to them, to intervene when they heard or saw signs of domestic violence. "Many neighbours believe that they do not have to interfere, but those neighbours hear it, the beatings are heard, the pleas are heard... We cannot continue to silence this," she told El Salto Diario. Several women who saw her video messaged her saying that they were saved from a domestic violence situation because their neighbours had intervened.

=== Domestic abuse organizations ===
Awareness video providing help information for victims, created by the City of Independence, Missouri

Some organizations have altered the services that they provide in order to help remove the individual from the situation. One in Pennsylvania, worked with the county solicitor began to provide hotel rooms for applicants whose protection-from-abuse orders prevent them from living with an abuser.

In response to the alarming reports, British Home Secretary Priti Patel stated on 29 March 2020 that victims of domestic violence are still allowed to leave their houses and seek safety in a refuge, that the National Domestic Abuse Helpline remained operational during the crisis, and that an extra 1.6 billion pounds had already been given to local councils 'to help those in need'. Pascale Franck, coordinator of the Family Justice Center Antwerp, recommended victims to reduce the risk of escalations by limiting interactions with their abusers (working or sporting in separate rooms), to contact online help services and erase their chat history after conversations with aid workers to prevent their abusers from finding out they are seeking help, to accommodate survivors in now-empty buildings such as hotels and bungalow parks, to expand the existing AWARE system (Abused Women's Active Response Emergency) where a victim can immediately contact the police via an app or alarm button after an escalation, to have police and justice evict perpetrators from the house or arrest them, and for people in a victim's support network to actively maintain daily contact with the victim through telephone or chat.

== See also ==
- Gendered impact of the COVID-19 pandemic
- Impact of the COVID-19 pandemic on crime

== Sources ==
This article incorporates text from a free content work. Licensed under CC BY-SA 3.0 IGO (license statement/permission). Text taken from Explainer: How COVID-19 impacts women and girls, UN Women.
