= Mental health service =

Mental health service(s) may refer to:

- Community mental health service
- Psychiatric hospital
- Psychiatric and mental health nursing

== Government programs ==
- Child and Adolescent Mental Health Services (CAMHS), NHS-provided services in the United Kingdom
- Substance Abuse and Mental Health Services Administration (SAMHSA), a branch of the U.S. Department of Health and Human Services

== See also ==
- California Mental Health Services Act
- Services for mental disorders
