= Amanda Herbert =

Cytopathologist

Amanda Herbert FRCPath
- Born: 1943 (age 82–83)
- Education: St Mary's Hospital, London

Amanda Herbert (born 1943) is a British cytopathologist and histopathologist.

== Career ==
Herbert studied medicine at St Mary's Hospital, graduating in 1968. In 1982, she became a consultant cytopathologist and histopathologist at Southampton University Hospitals Trust, moving in 1998 to Guy's and St Thomas' NHS Foundation Trust, where she became part-time in 2008. She is also an honorary senior lecturer at Guy's, King's and St Thomas' School of Medicine.

She served as chair of the cytopathology subcommittee and examination panel of the Royal College of Pathologists from 1993 to 1997; and in various roles at the British Society for Clinical Cytology from 1984. She is co-editor of the journal Eurocytology and was editor of Cytopathology from 2008 to 2014.

Herbert has been published in Acta Oncologica, the British Medical Journal, Cytopathology, Human Pathology, the Journal of Clinical Microbiology, the Journal of Family Planning and Reproductive Health Care, the Journal of General Virology, the Journal of Medical Screening, The Journal of Pathology, and Thorax.
