= Sixten Franzén =

Swedish cancer researcher

A. Sixten Franzén (26 November 1919 – 15 March 2008) was a Swedish scientist, and a leading cancer researcher of the 1950s and 1960s. He pioneered fine-needle aspiration cytology, in which suspected cancer cells are removed through a very fine needle for examination under a microscope.

Sixten Franzén was born in Västra Ryd parish in Östergötland County. After passing his studentexamen in Gävle, he studied medicine at Uppsala University and did practical work at the Karolinska University Hospital in Stockholm, where he continued to work for most of his career. He became a Bachelor of medical sciences in 1943, an MD in 1949, and after being recruited to work in Radiumhemmet, the university's oncology clinic, docent in radiotherapy and tumor diagnosis in 1968. On his retirement from the Karolinska University Hospital he was awarded the title of professor; he continued as a researcher for another twelve years, at Radiumhemmet and then at the Norwegian Radium Hospital in Oslo.

Franzén was trained in hematology-oncology rather than cytology, but pioneered fine-cell aspiration cytology as a method of diagnosing cancer after noticing that he could sometimes recognize metastatic cancer cells in liver biopsies. He also invented a pistol-grip handle to make aspiration of cell samples easier, and a method of trans-rectal sampling of prostate masses. Colleagues originally criticized him for practicing pseudoscience, but scientific opinion gradually swung to approve the technique; of three groups who developed it independently, his attracted the most attention for their publications. In 2006 he was declared International Cytopathologist of the Year.

He married Elsa Hedberg in 1944; they had five children.

== Selected publications ==
- with Joseph Linsk, Clinical Aspiration Cytology, Lippincott, 1983

== Sources ==
- "Franzén, A Sixten", Vem är Vem? Stor-Stockholm ed., 1962 online at Project Runeberg
- Jerry Waisman MD, Lambert Skoog MD, PhD, Edneia Tani MD, "Sixten Franzen, MD, PhD, Honorary Professor, 1919–2008", Cancer Cytopathology 114(5) 285–86, 25 October 2008, DOI: 10.1002/cncr.23795
- Utvald att leva (English: Chosen to live), Bonniers 1996, by Jerzy Einhorn, who worked with Franzén.
