= Nina's Journey =

2005 film

- Directed by: Lena Einhorn
- Written by: Lena Einhorn
- Produced by: Kaska Krosny
- Starring: Agnieszka Grochowska
- Cinematography: Dan Myhrman
- Release date: 4 November 2005 (Sweden)
- Running time: 120 minutes
- Countries: Poland; Sweden
- Languages: Polish; Swedish

Nina's Journey (Swedish: Ninas resa, Polish: Podróż Niny) is a 2005 Polish-Swedish drama film written and directed by Lena Einhorn. The film won the Guldbagge Award for Best Film and Best Screenplay at the 41st Guldbagge Awards.

== Story ==
The film is based on the real-life story of writer-director Lena Einhorn's mother, Nina Rajmic. When war broke out and the Nazis invaded, the family was moved to an apartment in the Warsaw Ghetto. Interviews are interspersed with dramatised segments showing her life as a young girl.

== Cast ==
- Agnieszka Grochowska as Nina Rajmic
- Maria Chwalibóg as Fanny
- Andrzej Brzeski as Artur Rajmic
- Pawel Iwanicki as Rudek Rajmic
