= Gösta Forssell =

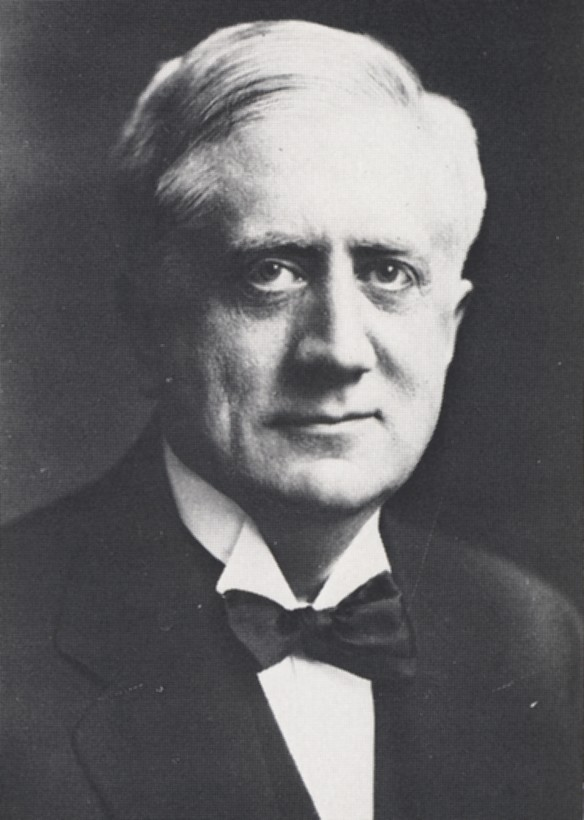
Gösta Forssell in the 1920s

Carl Gustaf "Gösta" Abrahamsson Forssell (2 March 1876 – 13 November 1950) was a Swedish medical researcher and professor in radiology and radiotherapy. He headed the radium clinic at Serafimerlasarettet in Stockholm and then its successor Radiumhemmet. His publications defined what became known as the "Stockholm method" of cancer therapy.

== Early life and education ==
Forssell was born on the estate of Vassbo in Aspeboda socken, Kopparbergs län. His father Abraham Forssell was an agronomist and businessman; Carl Gustav was the eldest of seven brothers, most of whom also became scientists, engineers and historians, and he also had two sisters. He graduated in 1895 from the Norra Latinlärovärket in Stockholm and began university studies at the Stockholm University in theology but soon changed to read medicine; he earned his M.B. in 1902, his Licentiate of Medical Science (Medicine licentiatexamen) degree in 1906 and in 1913 became M.D. at Karolinska Institutet. His doctoral thesis, on the relationship between X-rays of the human stomach and its anatomical structure, won the 1917 Jubilee Prize of the Swedish Medical Society. In 1899, while still a student, he spent a year as assistant to Thor Stenbeck, who that year performed the first successful radiotherapy of skin cancer using radium. In 1903 and 1908 he visited France and observed pioneering work with radiation and electricity, including by Antoine Béclère and Jean Bergonié.

== Career ==
Forssell was appointed assistant in radiology at the University of Uppsala in 1902. From 1906 to 1908, he directed the X-ray institute in the surgical clinic at the Serafimerlasarett; he then became director of the radiological institute there. From 1910 to 1926 he was chief physician at its successor, Radiumhemmet. He also held a professorship in medical radiology at Karolinska Institutet from 1916 to 1926, when he was promoted to professor ordinarius. From 1936, when a separate chair in therapeutic radiology was endowed, until his retirement in 1941 he was professor of diagnostic radiology; he was then appointed professor emeritus. After retirement he worked as a consultant to an insurance company.

Forssell played a major role in the founding of several professional associations: the Svensk förening för medicinsk radiologi (1918), the Nordisk förening för medicinsk radiologi (Nordic Society of Medical Radiology, 1919) and the Svenska sällskapet för medicinsk forskning (Swedish Society for Medical Research), and was founder editor of Acta Radiologica (1921), where he continued as editor until his death. He presided at the second International Congress of Radiology in Stockholm in 1928.

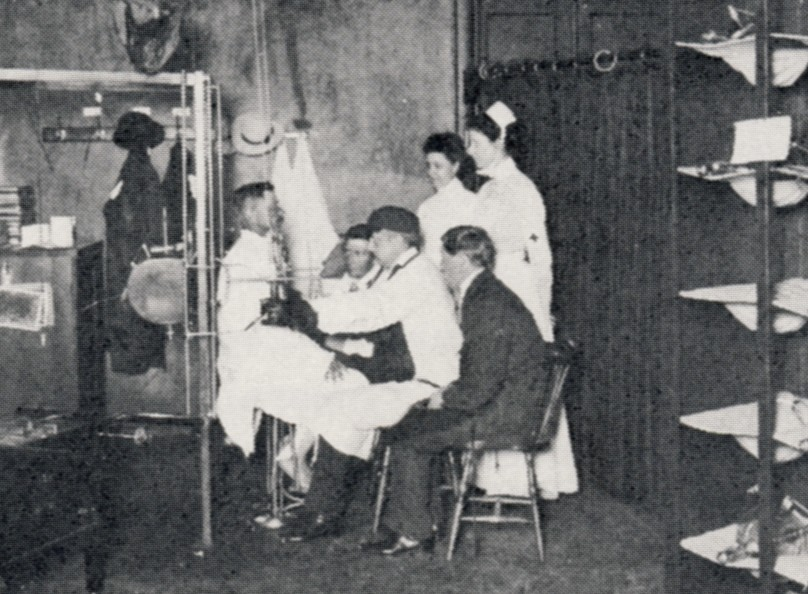
Forssell examining a patient fluoroscopically in 1911

== Research and publications ==
Forssell published more than 200 papers. His reports on the radium treatment of cancer, particularly uterine cancer, in what became known as the "Stockholm model", in particular "Erfarenheter om radiumbehandling av underlivskräfta vid Radiumhemmet i Stockholm 1910–1913" (Hygiea, 1915), were widely read and influential, as was his "Studies of the mechanism of movements of the mucous membrane of the digestive canal" (The American Journal of Roentgenology, 1923). He coined the term 'brachytherapy'. Among his early work were experiments in dark vision to determine why reading fluoroscopes was so challenging and tiring. When he turned 65, the "Gösta Forssell Research Fund", amounting to 100,000 kronor, was created to support his and others' research and the continuation of Acta Radiologica.

== Honours ==
Forssell was a member and honorary member of many learned societies outside Sweden; he was a Fellow of the British Royal Society of Medicine and was awarded the gold medal of the Radiological Society of North America and a number of honorary doctorates.

== Personal life and death ==
He married Esther Gottlieb, a secretary and translator, in 1906; they had four children. He died in Danderyd at the Karolinska University Hospital, aged 74, and is buried in the cemetery of Solna Church.
