= Jerzy Einhorn =

Polish-born Swedish doctor (1925–2000)

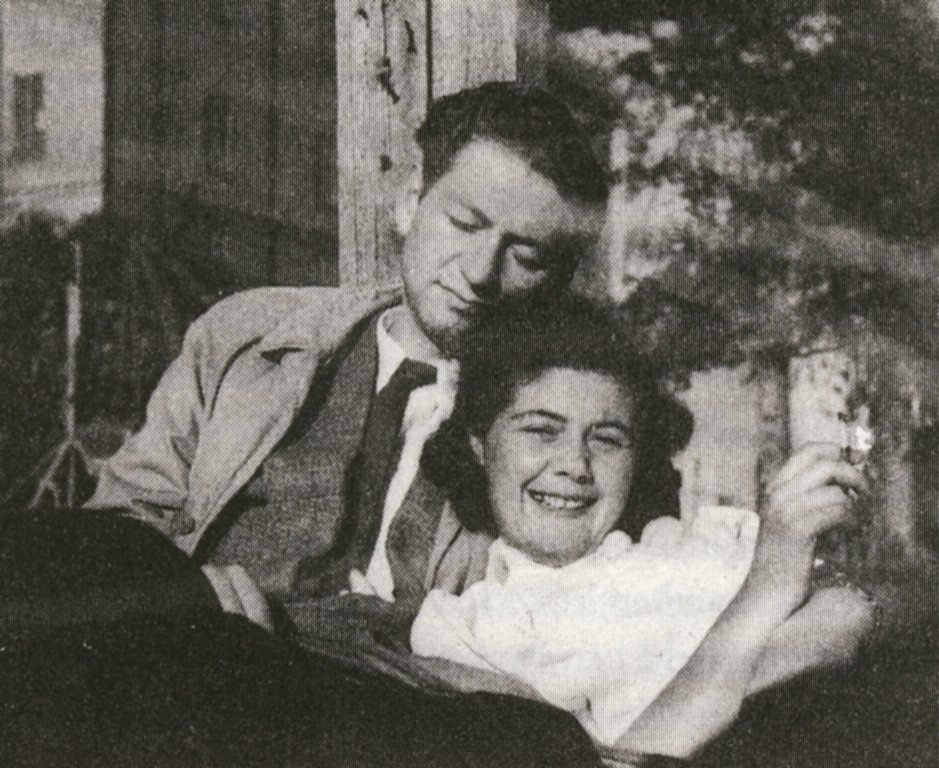
- Einhorn and his wife, Nina
- Born: 26 July 1925; Częstochowa, Poland
- Died: 28 April 2000 (aged 74); Danderyd, Stockholm, Sweden
- Medical career
- Institutions: Radiumhemmet
- Sub-specialties: radiotherapy

Jerzy Einhorn (26 July 1925 in Częstochowa, Poland – 28 April 2000 in Danderyd, Stockholm, Sweden) was a Polish-born Swedish medical doctor, researcher and politician (Kristdemokrat). His Hebrew name was Chil Josef, after his paternal grandfather.

Born into a Yiddish-speaking Jewish family, during the German occupation of Poland he became a victim of the Holocaust during World War II. He was first sent to the Warsaw Ghetto, then to the Częstochowa Ghetto outside his hometown, where he was detained at the HASAG-Placery concentration camp between June 1943 and January 1945. He later chronicled his experience there in a book entitled Utvald att leva (English: Chosen to live).

Einhorn graduated from secondary school in Częstochowa in 1945 and began to study medicine at the University of Łódź, then left Poland in 1946 to continue his studies in Denmark. Einhorn and his wife decided not to return to Poland and instead sought asylum in Sweden.

Einhorn was chief physician at Sweden's prestigious oncological institution, Radiumhemmet at the Karolinska University Hospital, from 1967 till he retired in 1992. He was a professor of radiotherapy and the director of the Karolinska Hospital in Stockholm. He was also a member of the Nobel Prize Committee in medicine, as well as an honorary member and recipient of the gold medal of the Radiological Society of North America, co-founded the European Society of Therapeutic Radiology and Oncology (ESTRO) in 1981.

Throughout their lives, both Einhorn and his wife, Nina, were actively involved in Zionist fundraising. During 1991-94, Einhorn was a Swedish MP for the Christian Democrats.

His children, Stefan and Lena Einhorn, are both well-known authors in Sweden. Stefan Einhorn is a professor of molecular oncology at the Karolinska Institute, and works as an MD at Radiumhemmet.

== Books ==
- Jerzy Einhorn, Utvald att leva, Bonniers (1996) (in Swedish)
- Jerzy Einhorn, Det är människor det handlar om, Bonniers (1998) (in Swedish)
