= Maria Chwalibóg =

Polish actress (1933–2024)

- Born: 4 February 1933; Warsaw, Poland
- Died: 15 March 2024 (aged 91)
- Education: Łódź Film School
- Occupation: Actress
- Years active: 1956–2015

Maria Teresa Chwalibóg-Kopiczyńska (4 February 1933 – 15 March 2024) was a Polish actress. She appeared in more than 30 films from 1956. Chwalibóg died on 15 March 2024, at the age of 91.

== Selected filmography ==
Film
Year	Title	Role	Notes
1961	Mother Joan of the Angels		
1973	Man – Woman Wanted		
1990	Korczak		
2005	Nina's Journey		
