= Nina Einhorn =

Swedish physician, cancer researcher

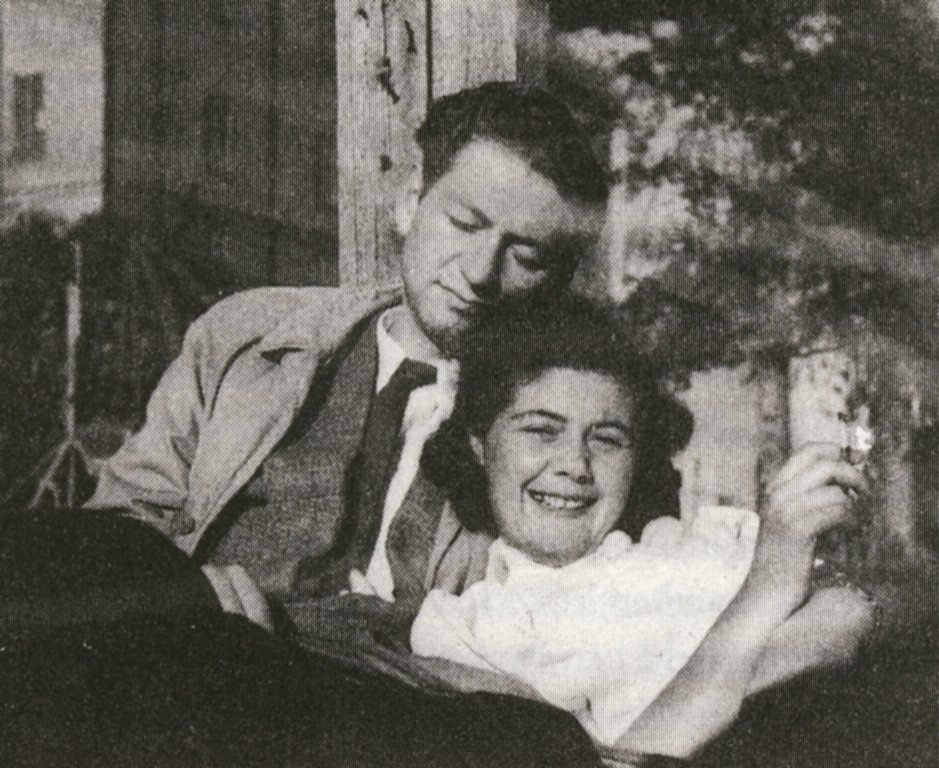
Jerzy and Nina Einhorn (1946)

Nina Einhorn (née Rajmic; 1925–2002) was a Jewish Polish-born Swedish physician who conducted research in the field of gynaecological oncology. A survivor from the Warsaw Ghetto, she studied medicine in Warsaw, met her husband-to-be, the physician Jerzy Einhorn, and emigrated to Sweden in the late 1940s. In 1964, she was engaged by the Radiumhemmet cancer treatment centre which she headed from 1986. Specializing in research into ovarian cancer, she chaired both the Swedish Ovarian Cancer Study Group and the International Gynecological Cancer Society. Einhorn also supported the Jewish cause, chairing for a time the Israeli institution Keren Hayesod. After she was diagnosed with breast cancer in 1999, she continued to conduct research until her death in May 2002.

== Early life, education and family ==
Born in Łódź, Poland, on 14 February 1925, Nina Rajmic was the daughter of the economist Artur Rajmic and his wife Fanja née Portnoj-Wygodzki. In 1937–38, together with her mother, she spent a year in New York City visiting relatives. After returning to Łódź, in February 1940 the family moved to Warsaw and the following November moved into an apartment in the Jewish ghetto. Nina attended a secret chemistry high school in the ghetto, matriculating in July 1942.

She managed to survive, first by working in a German textile factory, then by escaping from the ghetto in an ambulance and hiding in various places together with her brother Rudolf, latterly in the village of Krupia Wólka where they stayed until the Russians arrived in January 1945. The two were the only members of the family to survive. Nina then succeeded in reading medicine at Warsaw University.

At a meeting at the university for surviving Polish Jews, she met her husband to be Jerzy Einhorn. The two were among those invited in 1946 to do laboratory work in Copenhagen, Denmark, where on hearing of Jewish problems in Poland they attempted to stay. Faced with residence difficulties in Denmark, they moved to Sweden where they undertook further studies, first at the University of Uppsala, then at the Karolinska Institute in Stockholm. The couple married in 1949 and had two children, Lena (1954) and Stefan (1955).

== Career ==
Together with her husband, Nina Einhorn was granted Swedish citizenship in the mid-1950s. On graduating in 1955, she worked as a gynaecologist and obstetrician at the Södra BB maternity hospital in Stockholm. As a result of her increasing interest in cancerous tumors, in 1964 she was engaged by Radiumhemmet's gynaecological clinic. In 1968, she accompanied her husband to Nairobi, Kenya, where she worked for a few months as a researcher at the Kenyatta National Hospital. In 1971, she completed her doctorate at the Karoliskka Institute. She continued working at Radiumhemmet's gynaecological clinic, which she headed from 1986 until her retirement. Specializing in research into ovarian cancer, she chaired both the Swedish Ovarian Cancer Study Group and the International Gynecological Cancer Society.

After her retirement, she continued her involvement in research. From 1997, she chaired Stockholm's Cancerföreningen (Cancer Association) and helped found the patient organization Gyn-Cancerföreningen. Nina Einhorn also supported the Jewish cause, chairing for a time the Israeli institution Keren Hayesod.

In August 1999, Nina Einhorm and her husband were both diagnosed with cancer. Her husband died of leukaemia a few months later and she died of breast cancer on 10 May 2002, aged 77.

Nina Einhorn street in Stockholm.

== Homage ==
A street in Stockholm is named after Nina Einhorn.
