= Acta Radiologica =

- Discipline: Radiology
- Language: English
- Edited by: Arnulf Skjennald

Publication details
- Former name: Acta Radiologica: Diagnosis
- History: 1921–present
- Publisher: SAGE Publications in association with the Nordic Society of Medical Radiology
- Frequency: 10/year
- Impact factor: 1.603 (2014)

Standard abbreviations
- ISO 4: Acta Radiol.

Indexing
- CODEN: ACRAE3
- ISSN: 0284-1851 (print); 1600-0455 (web)
- OCLC no.: 15802741

Links
- Journal homepage; online access; Online archive

Acta Radiologica is a peer-reviewed medical journal covering the field of radiology, including diagnostic and interventional radiology, clinical radiology, experimental investigations in animals, and all other research related to imaging procedures. Acta Radiologica is published by SAGE Publications in association with the Nordic Society of Medical Radiology, a federation of societies of Medical Radiology in Denmark, Finland, Iceland, Norway and Sweden. The journal is edited by Arnulf Skjennald (Ullevål University Hospital, Oslo, Norway).

Acta Radiologica was established in 1921 and was originally published in German; it is now in English. It was founded by Gösta Forssell, who served as editor until his death in 1950. In 1963, it split into Acta Radiologica: Diagnosis and Acta Radiologica: Therapy, Physics, Biology. The journal renamed itself Acta Radiologica in 1987.

According to the Journal Citation Reports, it has a 2014 impact factor of 1.603, ranking it 72nd out of 125 journals in the category "Radiology, Nuclear Medicine & Medical Imaging".

== Article types ==
Examples of published items include:

- Review articles
- Short communications
- Technical and instrumental notes.
