= Lena Einhorn =

Swedish director, writer and physician

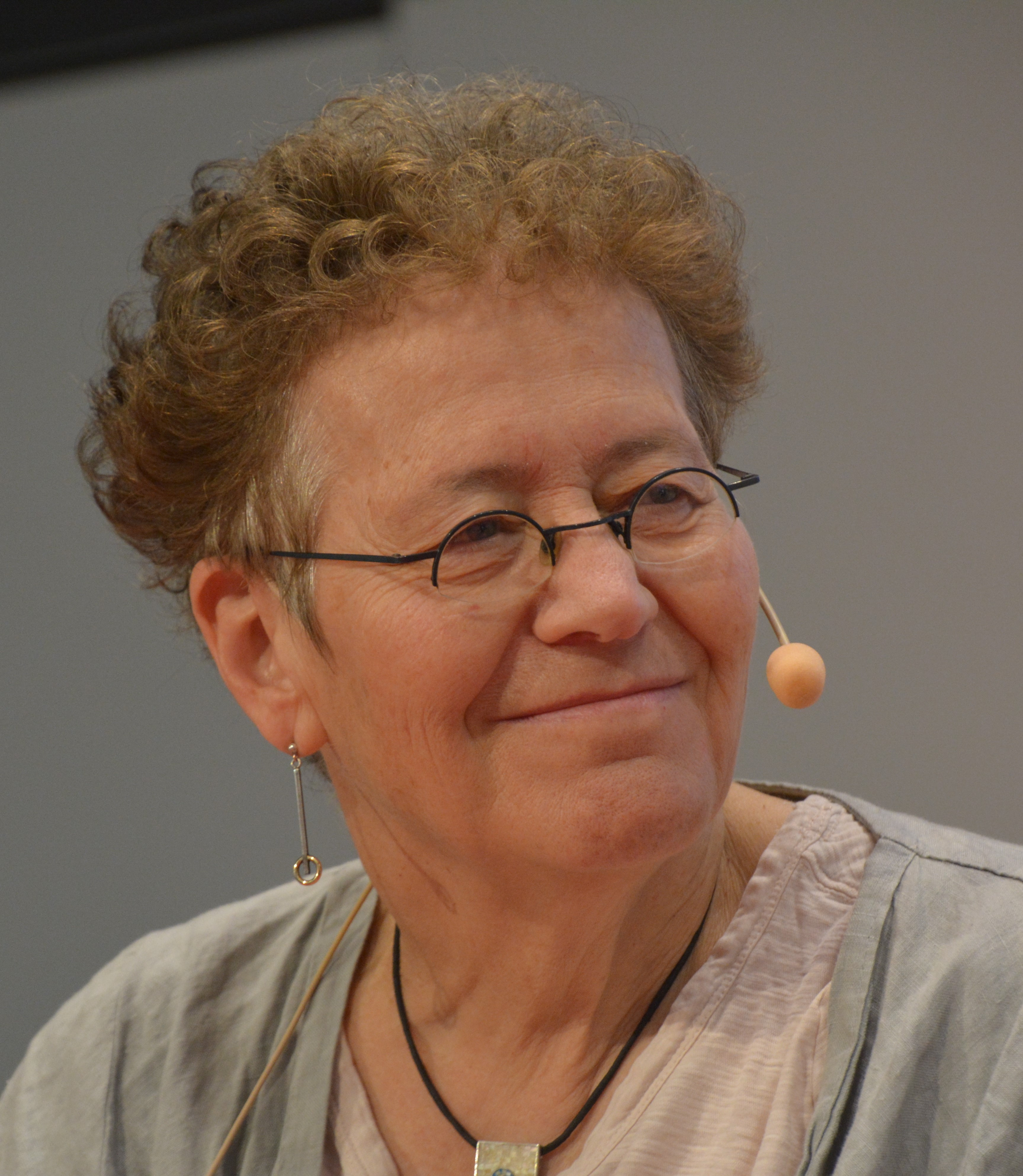
- Born: 19 May 1954 (age 72); Spånga, Sweden
- Notable work: Nina's Journey
- Relatives: Jerzy Einhorn (father); Stefan Einhorn (brother)

Lena Einhorn (born 19 May 1954) is a Swedish director and writer and former physician.

== Early life and family ==
Einhorn was born on 19 May 1954 in Spånga, Sweden. Her mother, Nina, escaped the Warsaw Ghetto during World War II and settled in Sweden, and her father, Jerzy, was a cancer specialist, politician and Holocaust survivor who wrote in 1966 a book about what he had experienced. Her younger brother is doctor and author, Stefan Einhorn.

== Career ==
After graduating from the Karolinska Institutet in Stockholm with a doctorate in virology and tumor biology, she worked as a doctor, specialising in tumour viruses and the causes of cancer in fetuses and newborns.

She changed careers when she lived in the United States in the 1980s and began working as a medical editor at Lifetime Television where she also produced and wrote medical documentaries. She also produced scientific and medical documentaries for independent companies and for PBS until she returned to Sweden in 1994.

She became an independent filmmaker after returning to Sweden. Her 1998 drama documentary, Handelsresande i liv, focused on rescue efforts during World War II and was the foundation of her first novel, also called Handelsresande i liv, which was published in 1999.

A month after both of Einhorn's parents were diagnosed with incurable cancer in late 1999, she did a filmed interview with her mother about her experiences of the Warsaw Ghetto during the Holocaust. Einhorn's plan was to make a feature film with her mother as the narrator however, she was not able to secure funding before her mother died in 2002 so she decided to write a book instead. She managed to secure funding six months later and released both a film and a book called Nina's Journey. The film won the Guldbagge Award for Best Film and for Best Screenplay and the book won the 2005 August Prize.

Einhorn co-wrote her first play, Living Room with Anette Sallmander. It premiered in 2008 at Kulturhuset in Stockholm.

She released the film, A Lost Artwork, in 2012 which followed a two year long search for six paintings which were looted by Nazis from her father's childhood home in Southern Poland.

Einhorn has written two books hypothesising an alternative understanding of the life, death, and resurrection of Jesus - The Jesus Mystery in 2007, and A Shift in Time in 2016.

Einhorn is a member of the Vetenskapsforum COVID-19, a group critical of the Swedish government's response to the COVID-19 pandemic in Sweden.
