= Stefan Einhorn =

Swedish writer

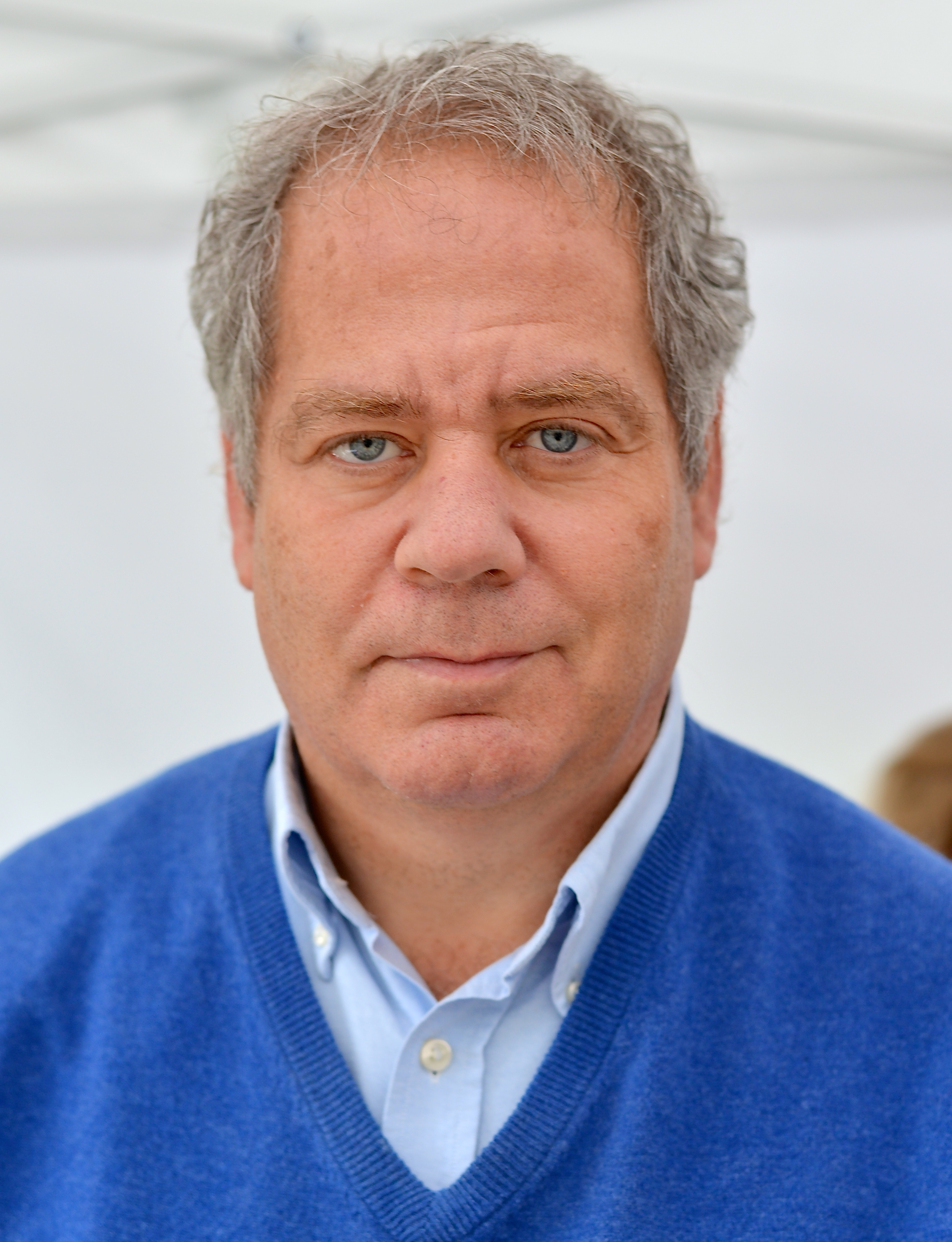
Stefan Einhorn "King's Garden", Stockholm, May 22, 2013 in connection with the Book of Hope Campaign for the Kindercancer Foundation

Stefan Einhorn (born October 26, 1955, in Stockholm) is a Swedish doctor, professor and writer. He is the son of Jerzy and Nina Einhorn, as well as the brother of Lena Einhorn.

== Biography ==
He received a degree from the Karolinska Institute in 1980 after presenting his thesis. In 1999 he became a professor of Molecular oncology at the Karolinska Institute. In 2013, he co-launched a Center for Social Sustainability (CSS) at the institute. He is also a general practitioner at Radiumhemmet and chairman of the Karolinska Institute's ethics council. Einhorn is also an active member of the Swedish Authors' Association.

== Activities ==
Einhorn hosted a summer radio program on June 25, 2002, and was the guest on the TV-huset television program on November 20, 2005.

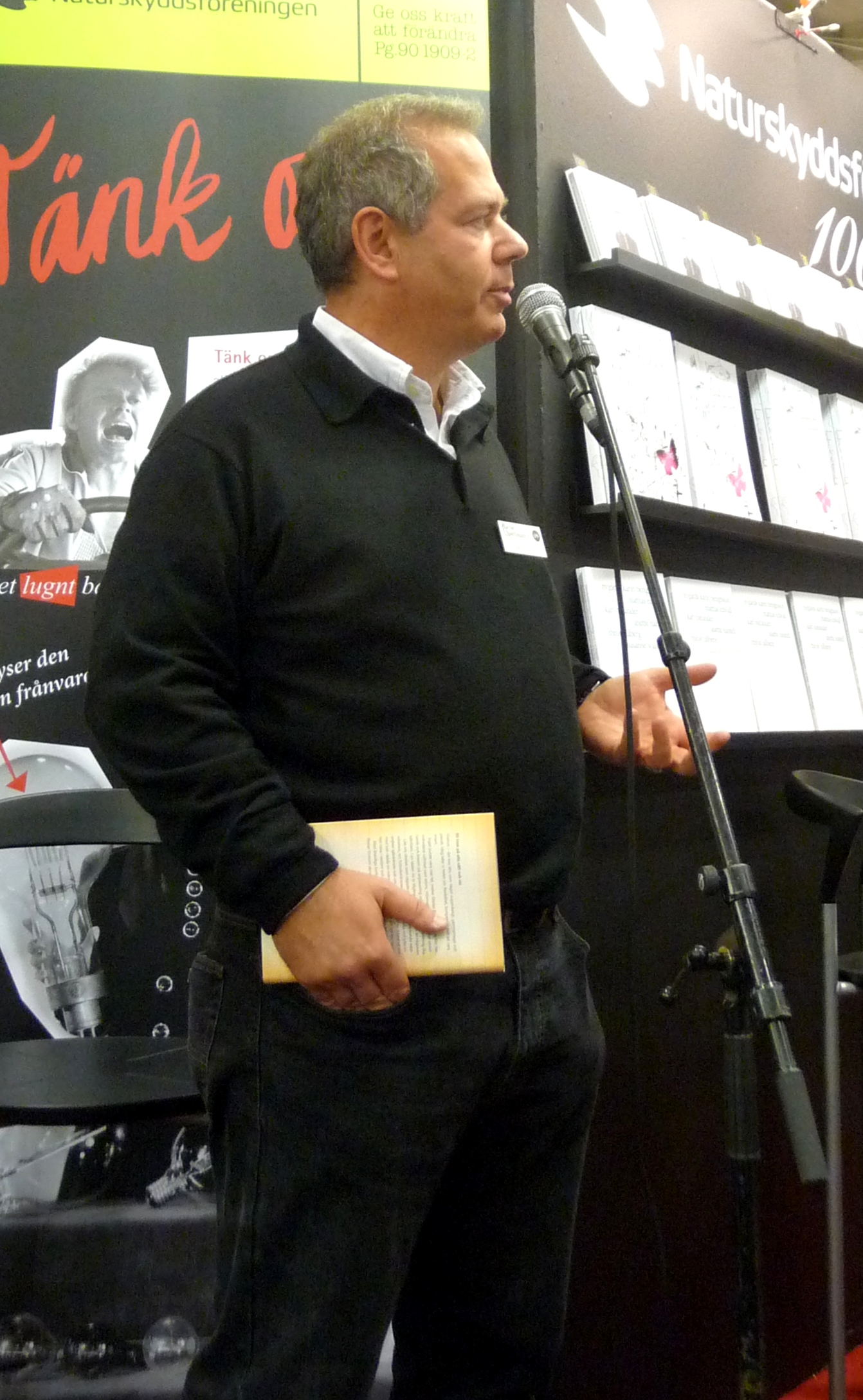
Stefan Einhorn

== Popular books ==
- 1991 – Hud i sol (med Cecilia Boldeman)
- 1992 – En liten bok om cancer (Cancerfonden)
- 2000 – Ont i kroppen (med Ralph Nisell)

== Other books ==
- 1998 – En dold Gud: om religion, vetenskap och att söka Gud
- 2003 – Den sjunde dagen
- 2005 – Konsten att vara snäll
- 2007 – Medmänniskor
- 2007 – Vägar till visdom
- 2011 – Änglarnas svar
- 2013 – Stenträdet (spänningsroman)
- 2014 – De nya dödssynderna: våra mörkaste sidor och hur vi kan hantera dem
- 2016 – Pappan
