= Region Stockholm =

Regional Government in Stockholm County, Sweden

Coordinates: 59°20′05″N 18°00′53″E

Type
- Type: Regional assembly

Leadership
- Chairperson: Aida Hadzialic, Social Democrats

Structure
- Seats: 149 members
- Political groups: Governing parties (65) Social Democrats (50) Centre Party (9) Green Party (6) Supporting party (18) Left Party (18) Opposition (57) Moderate Party (31) Sweden Democrats (16) Christian Democrats (10) Liberals (9)
- Length of term: 4 years

Elections
- Voting system: Proportional representation
- Last election: 11 September 2022
- Next election: 13 September 2026

Meeting place
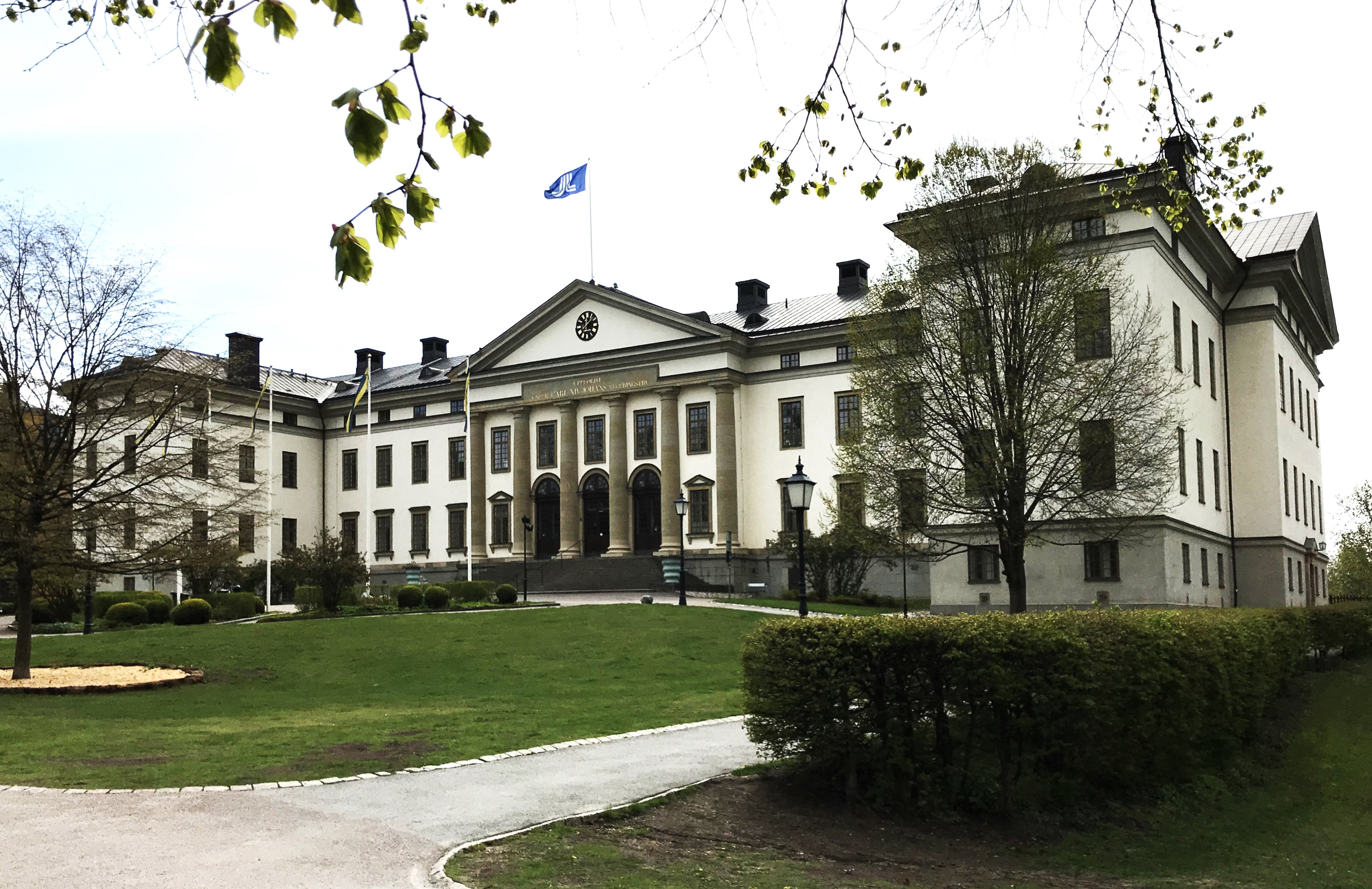
- Landstingshuset, Hantverkargatan 45, Kungsholmen, Stockholm

Website
- www.regionstockholm.se

Region Stockholm (Swedish: Region Stockholm) is the regional public body responsible for healthcare, public transport, and regional planning within Stockholm County, Sweden. Established on 1 January 2019, it replaced the former Stockholm County Council (Stockholms läns landsting) as part of a nationwide reform.

== History ==
When county councils (landsting) were established in 1863, Stockholm Municipality (Stockholms stad) was neither part of Stockholm County nor its county council. Instead, it operated as a separate entity managing its own county-related matters.

During the 20th century, the Greater Stockholm area emerged, as an integrated labour and housing market, increasing the need for regional coordination. A proposal for a "Greater County Council" (storlandsting) was introduced. In 1966, the Municipal Association for Regional Affairs of Stockholm City and County (Kommunalförbundet för Stockholms stads och läns regionala frågor) was established. By 1968, regional affairs of Stockholm Municipality were incorporated into Stockholm County, and in 1971, the Stockholm County Council (Stockholms läns landsting) was formed, encompassing the entire county with responsibility primarily for healthcare and public transport. Starting from 2019, Stockholm County Council was replaced by Region Stockholm, expanding its mandate to include regional development.

== Responsibilities ==
=== Healthcare ===
Region Stockholm manages and operates:

- Seven emergency hospitals, including Karolinska University Hospitals, Södersjukhuset, Danderyd Hospital, St. Göran's Hospital, Södertälje Hospital and Norrtälje Hospital
- Approximately 200 primary care centres (vårdcentraler)
- Specialist clinics and psychiatric care facilities
- Folktandvården Dental care services in Stockholm County

Region Stockholm is also involved in medical research and education in collaboration with local universities, particularly Karolinska Institute.

=== Public Transport ===
Region Stockholm oversees public transport in the county through its companies SL and Waxholmsbolaget.

The transport network includes:

- Stockholm Metro (Tunnelbana): Three lines with a total of 100 stations
- Commuter rail (Pendeltåg): Local mainline trains in Stockholm County
- Bus services covering the entire county
- Local and light rail systems: Tvärbanan, Nockebybanan, Lidingöbanan, Saltsjöbanan, Roslagsbanan and Spårväg City
- SL commuter ferries
- Waxholmsbolaget Archipelago ferries

=== Regional development ===
Region Stockholm leads and coordinates the work for sustainable development in the Stockholm region.

== Politics ==
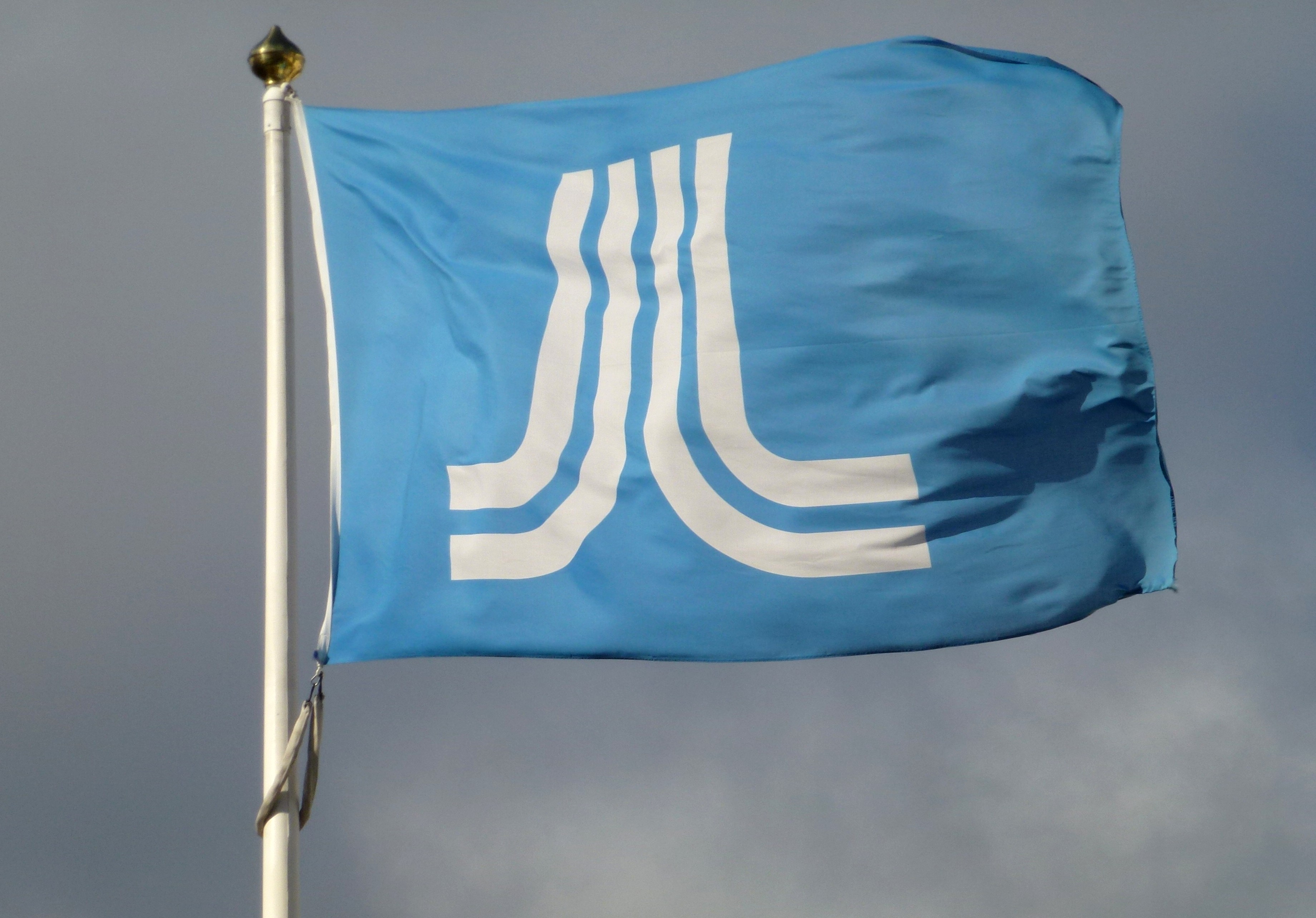
Regional Council Flag

=== Election results ===
The regional assembly (Swedish: regionfullmäktige) election results 2022:

| Party | Seats |
|---|---|
| Social Democratic Party | 50 |
| Moderate Party | 31 |
| Sweden Democrats | 16 |
| Left Party | 18 |
| Centre Party | 9 |
| Liberals | 9 |
| Christian Democrats | 10 |
| Green Party | 6 |
| Total | 149 |

The regional assembly (Swedish: regionfullmäktige) election results 2018:

| Party | Seats |
|---|---|
| Social Democratic Party | 40 |
| Moderate Party | 34 |
| Left Party | 16 |
| Sweden Democrats | 15 |
| Centre Party | 12 |
| Liberals | 12 |
| Christian Democrats | 12 |
| Green Party | 8 |
| Total | 149 |

=== 2022–2026 term ===
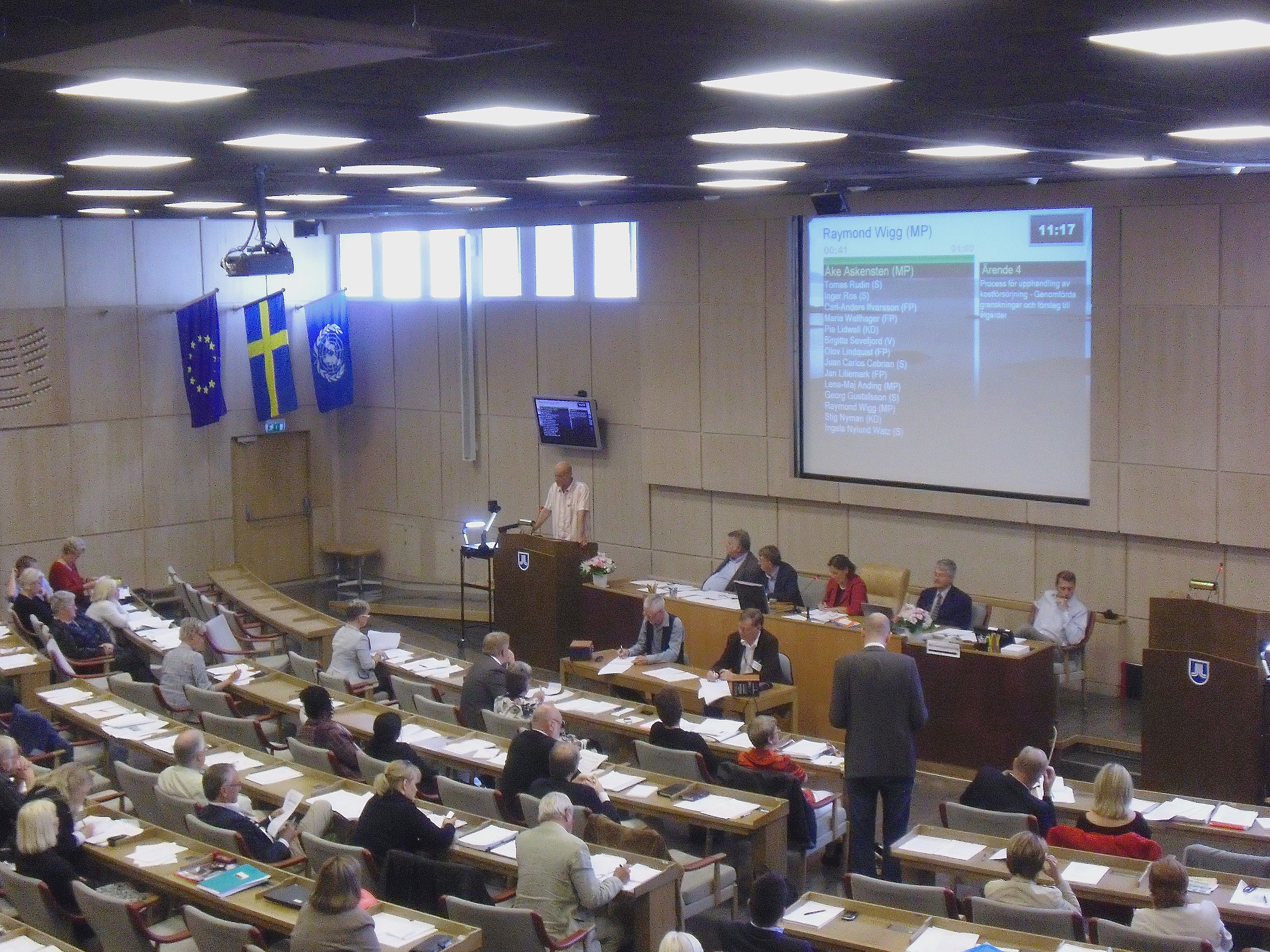
The Regional Council in session at the Landstingshuset in Stockholm, August 2009

The Regional Council consists of 149 members who meet eight times a year. The Social Democrats, the Centre Party, and the Green Party form the governing coalition for the 2022–2026 term. The Left Party is a supporting party to the coalition, collectively holding a majority.

List of governing regional councilors:

- Aida Hadzialic (Social Democrats), Finance Regional Councilor
- Talla Alkurdi (Social Democrats), Healthcare Regional Councilor
- Anton Fendert (Green Party), Transport Regional Councilor
- Gustav Hemming (Centre Party), Climate, Infrastructure, and Archipelago Regional Councilor
- Christine Lorne (Centre Party), Primary Care Regional Councilor
- Jens Sjöström (Social Democrats), Investment Regional Councilor
- Robert Johansson (Social Democrats), Personnel Regional Councilor

Through its cooperation with the governing coalition, the Left Party holds the following opposition regional councilors:

- Anna Sehlin (Left Party)
- Jonas Lindberg (Left Party)

The opposition includes the following opposition regional councilors:

- Iréne Svenonius (Moderate Party)
- Kristoffer Tamsons (Moderate Party)
- Msciwoj Swigon (Sweden Democrats)
- Désirée Pethrus (Christian Democrats)
- Amelie Tarschys Ingre (Liberals)

The current composition of the Stockholm regional council.

=== Regional Board ===
The Regional Board consists of 19 members and an equal number of deputies. The Social Democrats hold five seats, the Moderates four, the Left Party, Sweden Democrats, Centre Party, and Green Party hold two each, while the Christian Democrats and Liberals hold one each.

| Position | Party | Name |
|---|---|---|
| Chairperson | Social Democrats | Aida Hadzialic |
| 1st Vice Chairperson | Centre Party | Gustav Hemming |
| 2nd Vice Chairperson | Moderate Party | Kristoffer Tamsons |

== See also ==
- Karolinska University Hospital
- Storstockholms Lokaltrafik
- Stockholm Municipality
- List of governors of Stockholm County
