= Human Pathology =

- Discipline: Pathology
- Language: English
- Edited by: Dr. Lori Erickson

Publication details
- History: 1970-present
- Publisher: Saunders
- Frequency: Monthly
- Impact factor: 3.014 (2016)

Standard abbreviations
- ISO 4: Hum. Pathol.

Indexing
- CODEN: 0046-8177
- ISSN: 0046-8177 (print); 1532-8392 (web)
- LCCN: 77014017
- OCLC no.: 1752392

Links
- Journal homepage; Online archive

Human Pathology is a monthly peer-reviewed medical journal covering pathology in humans. It was established in 1970 and is published by Saunders. The editor-in-chief is Dr. Lori Erickson. According to the Journal Citation Reports, the journal has a 2016 impact factor of 3.014.
