= Acta Oncologica =

- Discipline: Oncology
- Language: English
- Edited by: Mef Nilbert

Publication details
- Former name(s): Acta Radiologica: Therapy, Physics, Biology Acta Radiologica: Oncology, Radiation, Physics, Biology Acta Radiologica: Oncology
- History: 1963–present
- Publisher: Taylor and Francis Group
- Frequency: 8/year
- Open access: Delayed, after 6 months
- Impact factor: 4.311 (2021)

Standard abbreviations
- ISO 4: Acta Oncol.

Indexing
- CODEN: ACTOEL
- ISSN: 0284-186X (print); 1651-226X (web)
- OCLC no.: 37914584

Links
- Journal homepage; Online access; Online archive

Acta Oncologica is a peer-reviewed medical journal of oncology and the official journal of the five Nordic oncological societies. It is published by Taylor and Francis Group and was originallyt established in 1963 as Acta Radiologica: Therapy, Physics, Biology, splitting from Acta Radiologica alongside Acta Radiologica: Diagnosis. It then renamed Acta Radiologica: Oncology, Radiation, Physics, Biology in 1978, then Acta Radiologica: Oncology in 1980. It took its current name in 1987.

The editor-in-chief is Mef Nilbert (Lunds University). According to the Journal Citation Reports, the journal has a 2021 impact factor of 4.311.
