= BMJ Sexual and Reproductive Health =

Academic journal

- Discipline: Reproductive health
- Language: English
- Edited by: Sharon Cameron

Publication details
- Former names: Journal of Family Planning Doctors; British Journal of Family Planning; Journal of Family Planning and Reproductive Health Care
- History: 1974–present
- Publisher: BMJ Group
- Frequency: Quarterly
- Impact factor: 3.2 (2025)

Standard abbreviations
- ISO 4: BMJ Sex. Reprod. Health

Indexing
- ISSN: 1471-1893 (print); 2045-2098 (web)
- LCCN: 2001243048
- OCLC no.: 46362612

Links
- Journal homepage; Online access; Online archive

BMJ Sexual and Reproductive Health is a quarterly peer-reviewed medical journal covering reproductive health. It was established in 1974 as the Journal of Family Planning Doctors and later renamed British Journal of Family Planning and Journal of Family Planning and Reproductive Health Care before obtaining its current title.

It is published by BMJ Group on behalf of the Faculty of Sexual and Reproductive Healthcare, of which it is the official journal. The editor-in-chief is Sharon Cameron. According to the Journal Citation Reports, the journal has a 2025 impact factor of 3.2.

== Abstracting and indexing ==
The journal is abstracted and indexed in:

- Current Contents/Clinical Medicine
- Current Contents/Social & Behavioural Sciences
- Index Medicus/MEDLINE/PubMed
- Science Citation Index Expanded
- Scopus
- Embase
- Social Sciences Citation Index

== Former names and International Standard Serial Numbers ==
- 1974–1977:

Journal of Family Planning Doctors

OCLC 37427388 (all editions)

- 1977–2001:

The British Journal of Family Planning

ISSN 0144-8625 (print)
ISSN 2756-2476
ISSN 1224-7294 Ediția română (Romanian ed.)

- 2001–2018:

Journal of Family Planning and Reproductive Health Care

ISSN 1471-1893 (print)
ISSN 2045-2098 (web)

- 2018–current:

BMJ Sexual & Reproductive Health

ISSN 2515-1991 (print)
ISSN 2515-2009 (web)
