= Journal of Medical Screening =

Quarterly medical journal

- Subject: Medical screening
- Language: English
- Edited by: Nicholas Wald

Publication details
- History: 1994–present
- Publisher: SAGE Publications
- Frequency: Quarterly
- Impact factor: 2.689 (2017)

Standard abbreviations
- ISO 4: J. Med. Screen.

Indexing
- CODEN: JMSCFE
- ISSN: 0969-1413 (print); 1475-5793 (web)
- OCLC no.: 916389385

Links
- Journal homepage; Online access; Online archive

The Journal of Medical Screening is a quarterly peer-reviewed medical journal covering medical screening. It was established in 1994 and is published by SAGE Publications. The editor-in-chief is Nicholas Wald (Wolfson Institute of Preventive Medicine). According to the Journal Citation Reports, the journal has a 2017 impact factor of 2.689, ranking it 50th out of 180 journals in the category "Public, Environmental & Occupational Health".
