= Aida Hadžialić =

Swedish politician (born 1987)

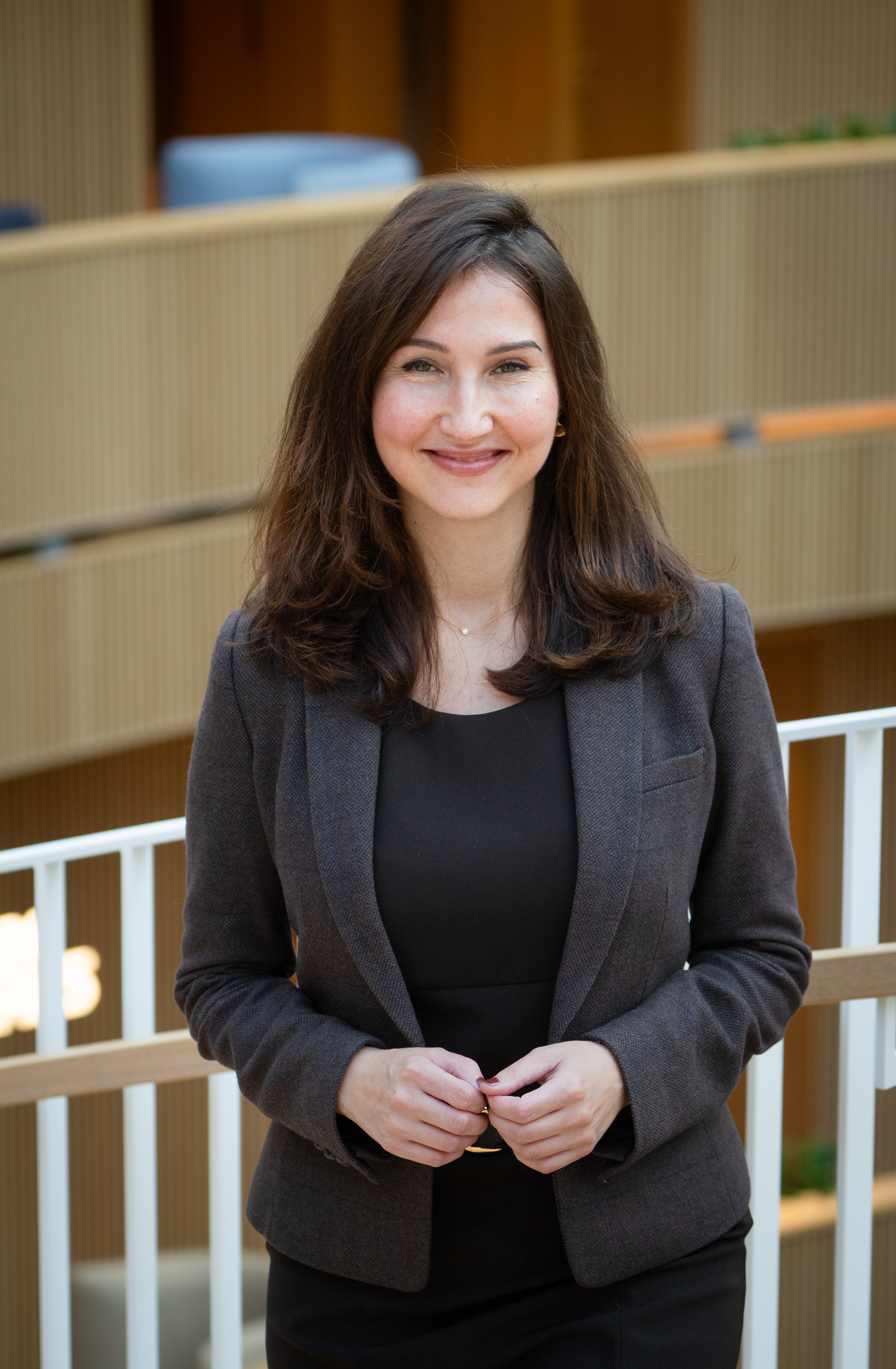
- Aida Hadžialić, 2025.

President of the Stockholm County Council
- Incumbent
- Assumed office 18 October 2022
- Governor: Sven-Erik Österberg (M); Anna Kinberg Batra (M); Claes Lindgren (acting)
- Preceded by: Iréne Svenonius (M)

Minister for Upper Secondary School, Adult Education and Training
- In office 3 October 2014 – 15 August 2016
- Monarch: Carl XVI Gustaf
- Prime Minister: Stefan Löfven
- Preceded by: Office created
- Succeeded by: Anna Ekström

Personal details
- Born: 21 January 1987 (age 39) Foča, SR Bosnia and Herzegovina, SFR Yugoslavia
- Party: Social Democrats
- Occupation: Lawyer

Aida Hadžialić (Swedish pronunciation: [ˈǎjda hatsˈjɑ̌ːlɪtɕ], Bosnian: [aǐːda xadʒiǎliːtɕ]; born 21 January 1987) is a Bosnian-born Swedish politician and a member of the Social Democrats. She served as Minister for Upper Secondary School, Adult Education and Training from 3 October 2014 until her resignation on 15 August 2016. Prior to joining the government she served as deputy mayor 2010–2014 in Halmstad, Halland.

Since 18 October 2022, she has been serving as the President of the Stockholm County Council.

She holds a Master of Laws (LL.M.) from the University of Lund, Sweden. In 2014, she also began studies at the Stockholm School of Economics before becoming a member of the government. Hadžialić is an international baccalaureate alumna, being fluent in Swedish, English and Bosnian.

She resigned from her position as a minister 13 August 2016 after a visit to Copenhagen whereafter she drove just above the legal alcohol limit on the Swedish bridgehead of the Øresund Bridge. The control indicated 0.2 per mille which was exactly on the limit. Hadžialić was however driving legally on the Danish side of the Øresund Bridge where the legal drinking limit is 0,5 per mille.

She has on numerous occasions been voted as one of the most talented young leaders in Sweden.

Hadžialić currently runs a consultancy firm specializing in global affairs, Nordic West Office, which she founded with Jorma Ollila, Risto E.J Penttilä, Kristiina Helenius and Charles C. Adams Jr. She also serves as an advisor to the BMW Foundation.

== Images ==
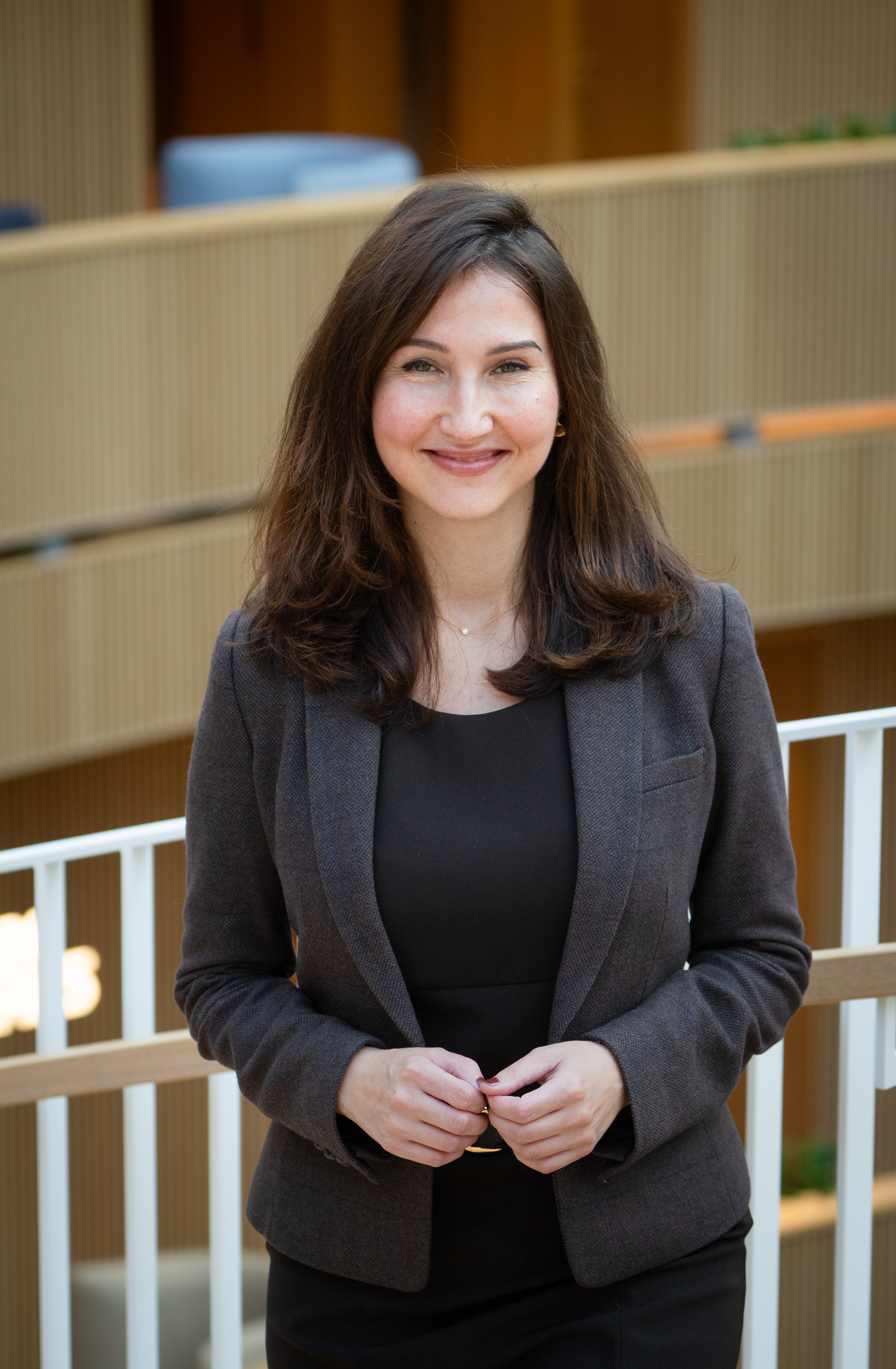
Aida Hadžialić, 2025.

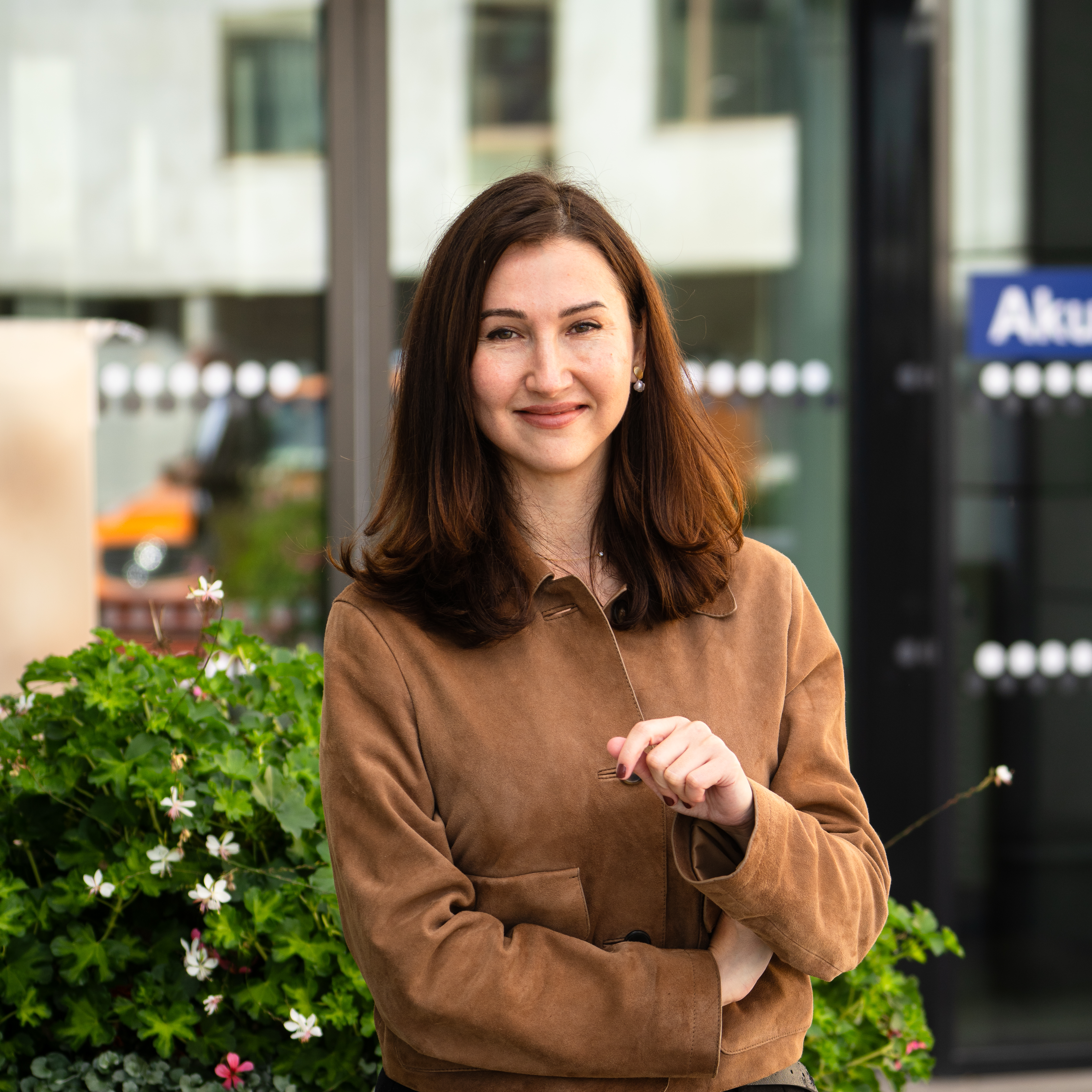
Aida Hadžialić in Stockholm County, 2025.

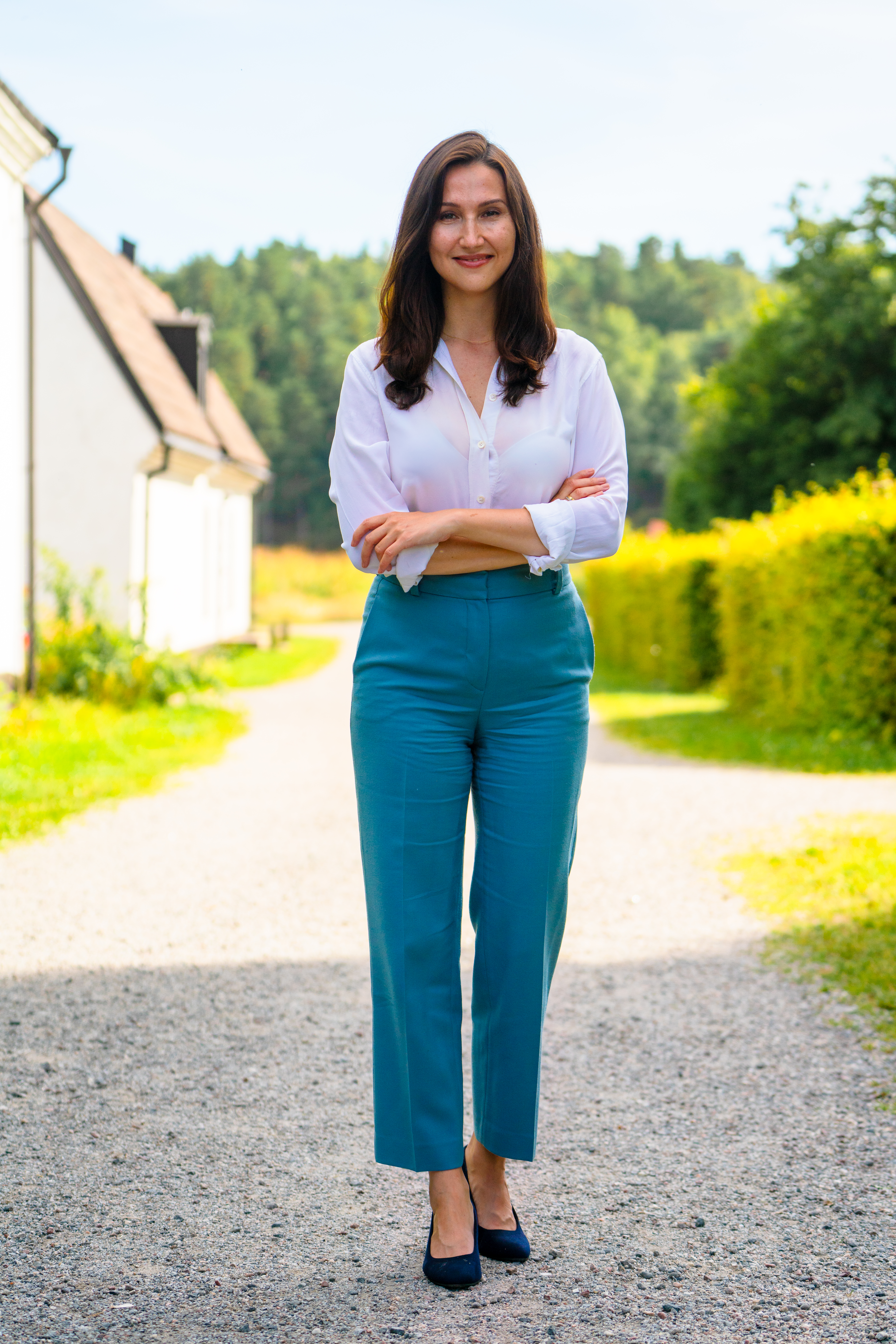
Aida Hadžialić, 2022.

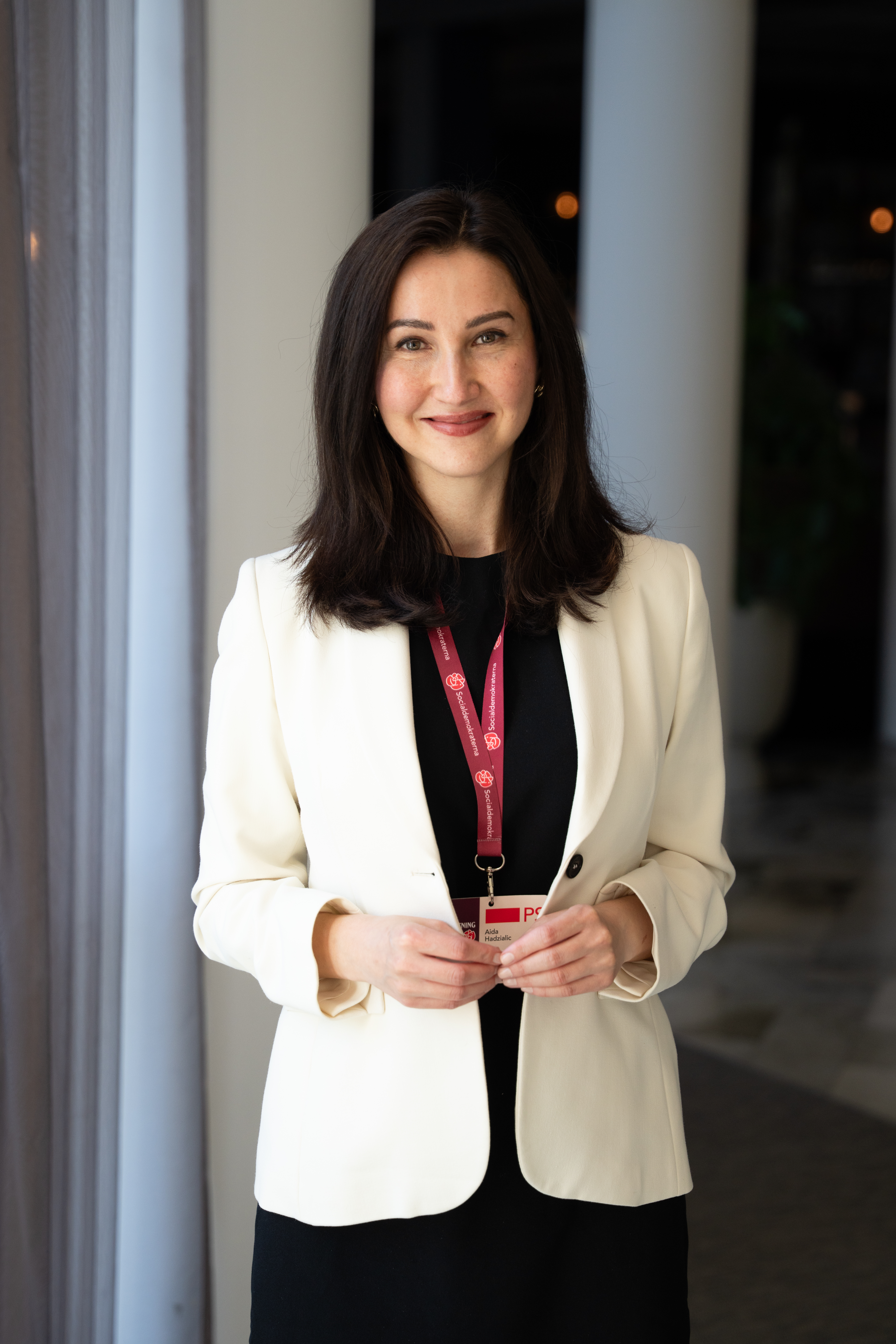
Aida Hadžialić, 2025.
