= Radiumhemmet =

Coordinates: 59°21′8″N 18°2′9″E

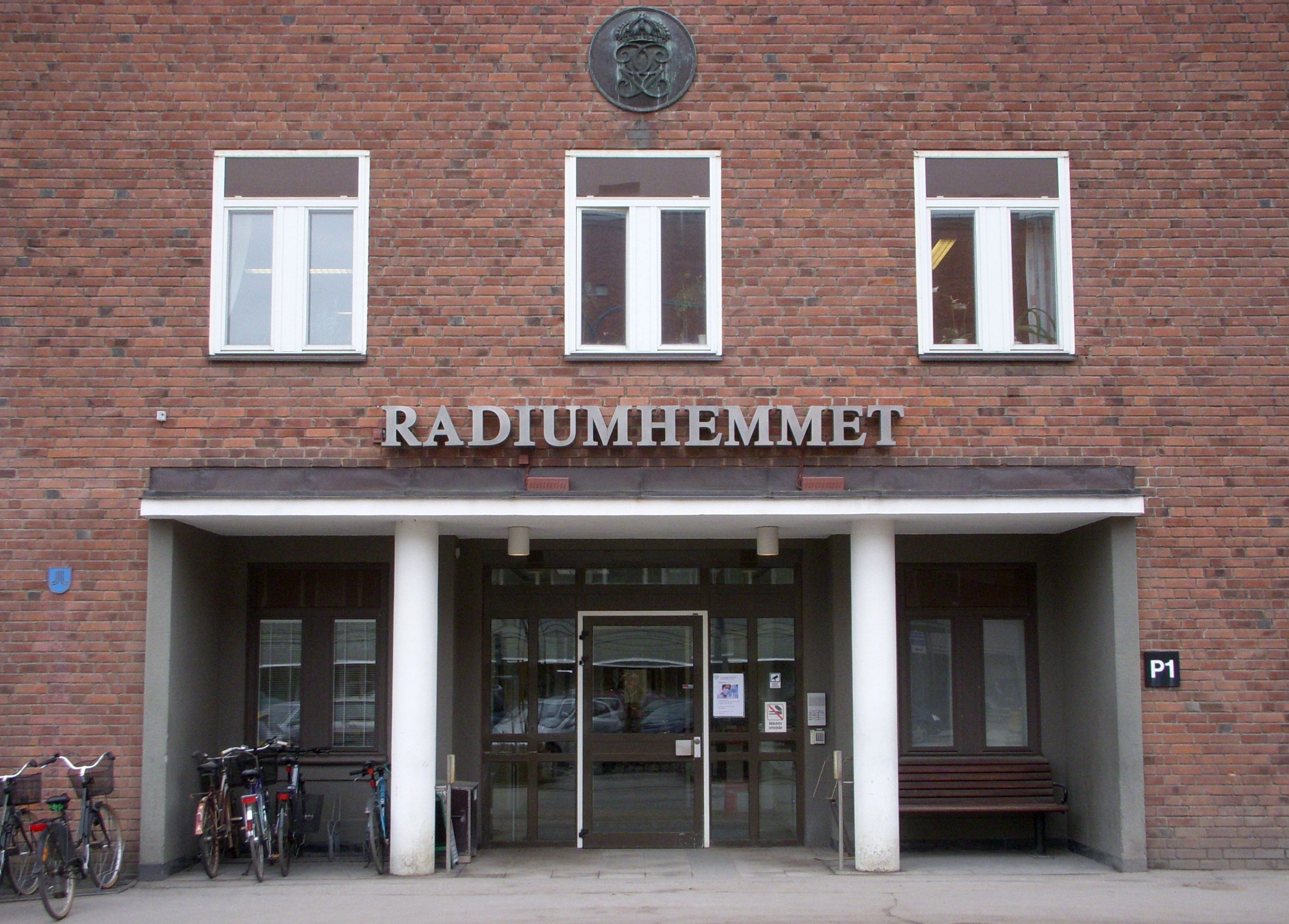
Radiumhemmet main entrance photographed in 2010

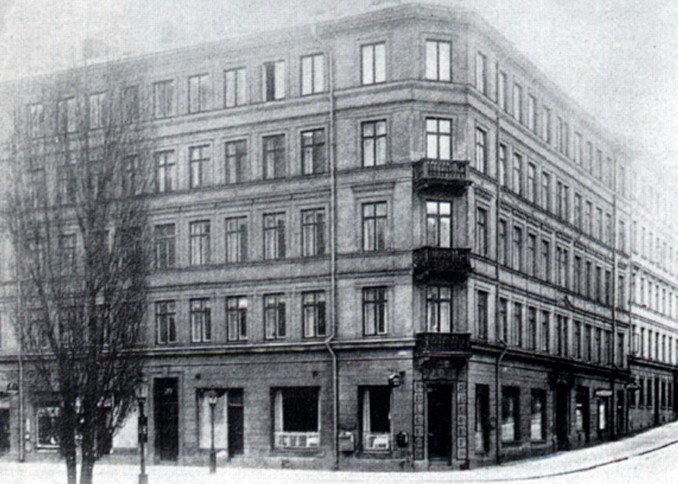
1910 photograph of the building at 10 Scheelegatan where Radiumhemmet opened that year in a rented flat

Radiumhemmet is a non-surgical cancer treatment and radiotherapy research institution in Solna, Sweden. Since 1938, it has been a division of what is now the Karolinska University Hospital. It was founded in 1910 in central Stockholm as the first oncological clinic in Sweden, succeeding a radium research and treatment institution at the Serafimerlasarett founded in 1906, and played a major role in the development of radiotherapy, especially in gynaecological cancers.

== History ==
The Serafimerlasarett set up a radium diagnosis laboratory in 1903. In 1906 it was transferred from the medical department to the surgical department, whose chief, John Berg, appointed as its director Gösta Forssell, who had been researching radiotherapy. In 1910, this was succeeded by Radiumhemmet, which was established by charitable gifts as an independent institution for radium and X-ray therapy under Svenska Cancerforeningen, the Swedish Cancer Society. It was housed in an 8-room rented flat at 10 Scheelegatan on Kungsholmen, and had sixteen beds and one X-ray therapy unit. The name, which means "Radium Home", was chosen to reassure patients. After promising results in gynaecological patients, the Stockholm Municipality provided funds for its expansion, with Queen Victoria matching them. Numbers of patients climbed steadily, from 342 to 742 between 1911 and 1914. Forssell hired as associates Elis Berven and James Heyman, and in 1916 the clinic moved to a building at 23 Fjällgatan, doubling the number of beds and increasing the number of X-ray units. At Forssell's request, the Swedish government promised patients free transportation from anywhere in Sweden; this is still in effect. In 1917 a separate gynaecological division was created with Heyman as its director, and Berven became head of the general clinic. In 1924 research divisions for tumour pathology and radiophysics were created.

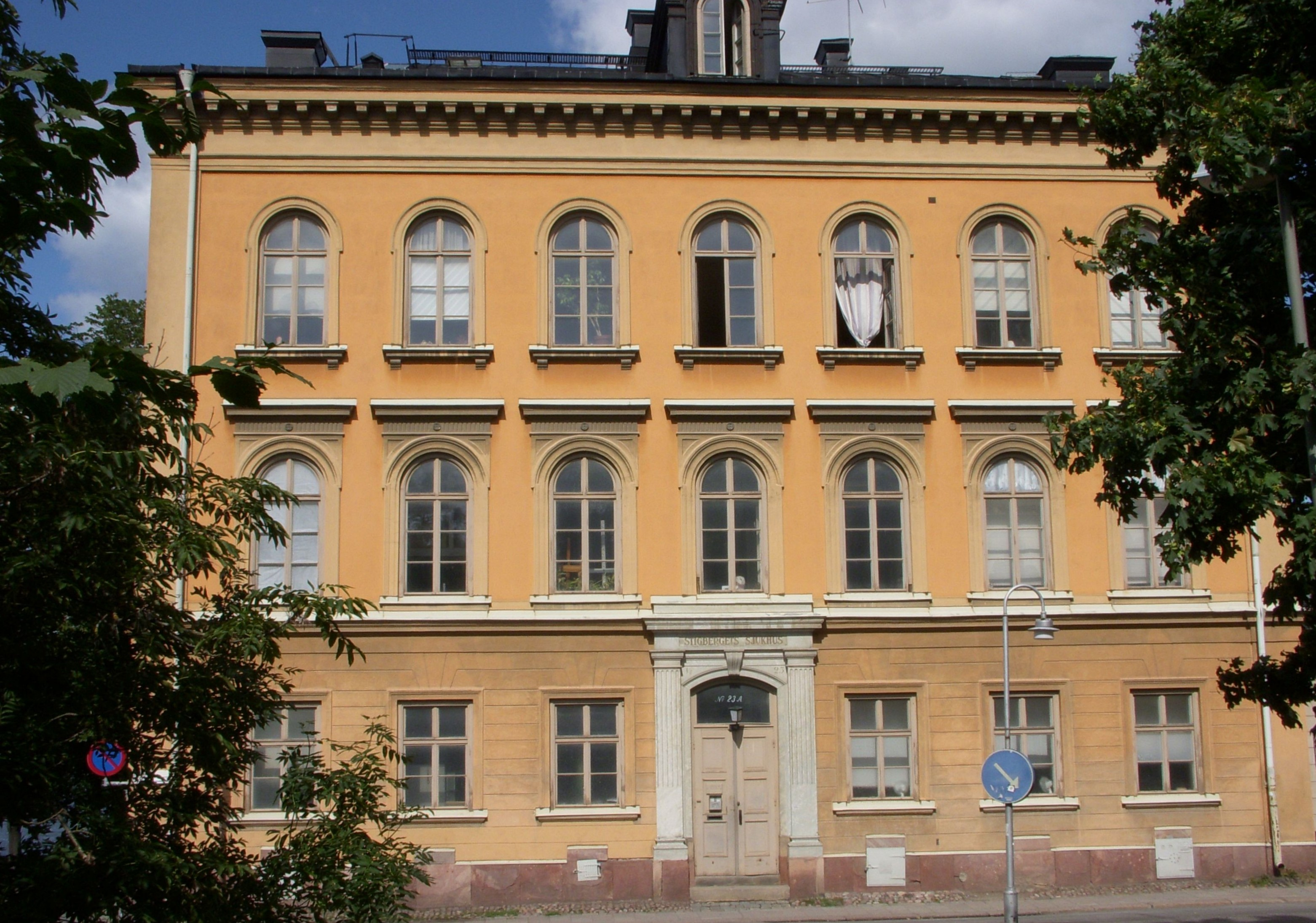
23A Fjällgatan, one of Radiumhemmet's two buildings in 1916–1938

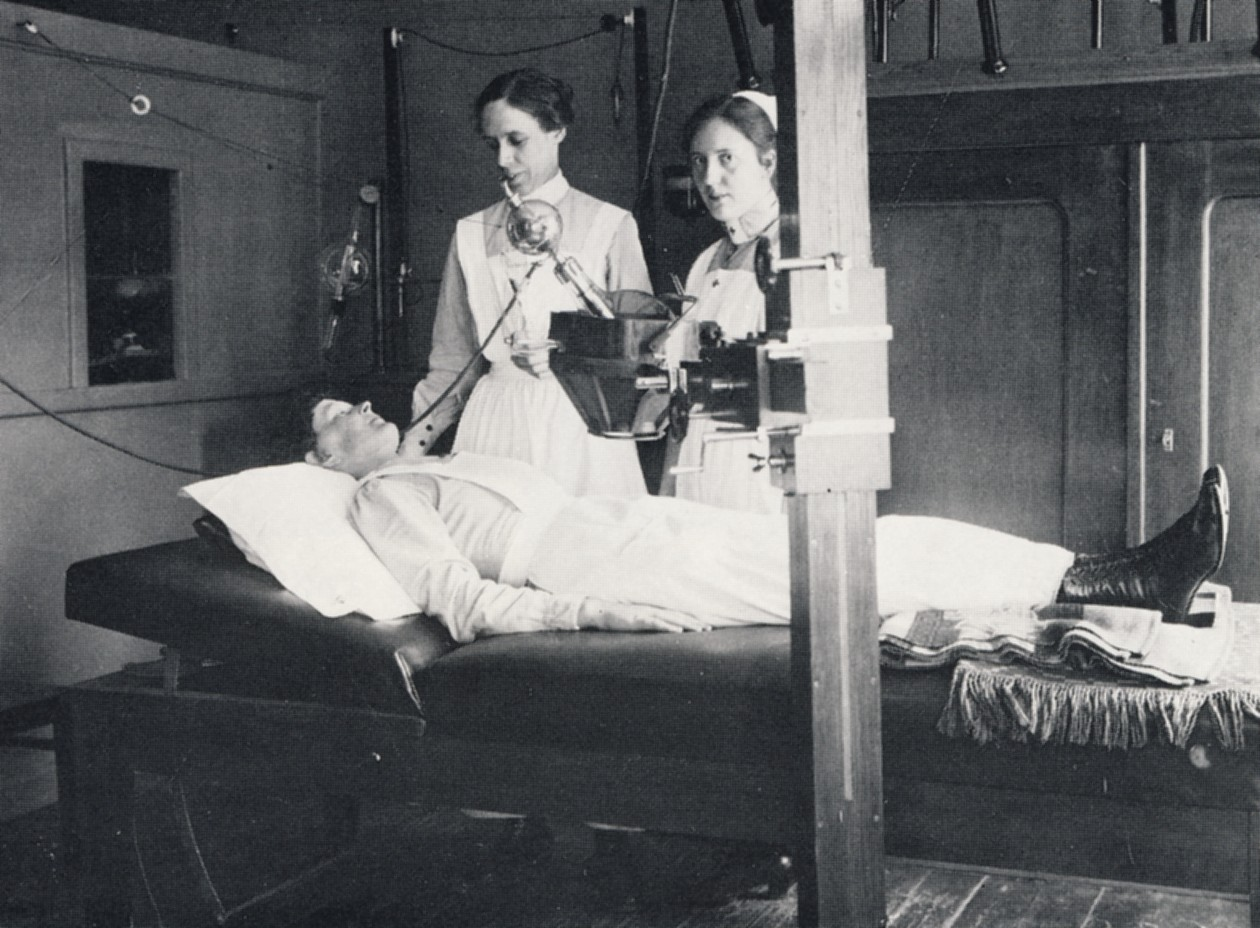
X-ray treatment at Radiumhemmet, early 1920s

In celebration of King Gustav V's seventieth birthday in 1928, a fund of more than 5 million kronor, the King Gustav V Jubilee Fund, was created; the royal couple decided to dedicate it to clinics and medical research, which led to the establishment of institutions in Gothenburg and Lund on the model of Radiumhemmet, and the foundation of the Karolinska Hospital, now the Karolinska University Hospital. In 1936 Radiumhemmet and its Institutes of Radiopathology (directed by Olle Reuterwall) and Radiophysics (directed by Rolf Maximilian Sievert) moved to the new university complex. With this move, Radiumhemmet became state-owned.

In 1940 Radiumhemmet was expanded, with a separate X-ray diagnostics division. From the 1940s until 1968 Radiumhemmet modernised and extended its services, while basic research, radiation biology, and radiation protection were separated from it. There was then considerable discussion over a proposed reorganisation of Karolinska Hospital which would have shorn it of all but radiotherapy and record-keeping. Eventually in 1974 cancer treatment in Sweden was reorganised into centres internally organised by anatomical specialisation, and in 1975 Radiumhemmet became a centre for all non-surgical cancer treatment, including cancer prevention, early detection and psychosomatic treatment. At this time there were 124 beds and 450–500 patients were seen on an outpatient basis per day. In 1982 the Riksdag transferred responsibility for the Karolinska Hospital from the state to Stockholm County. The Radiumhemmet building was entirely renovated in 1984 and extended in 1988.

Beginning in the 1980s, Radiumhemmet was affected by shortages of government funds for medical services. Equipment could not be obtained or repaired. Radiotherapy patients had to wait for six weeks for an appointment. Layoffs were still occurring in 2015.

Since 2011, Radiumhemmet has been part of the Regional Cancer Centre Stockholm/Gotland, headed by Roger Henriksson, who was appointed chief physician at Radiumhemmet in 2009. In late 2015 the Stockholm County Council accepted a proposal to re-divide non-surgical cancer care in the region, between Radiumhemmet, a new comprehensive cancer care centre at Södersjukhuset and a clinic at the private Saint Göran Hospital, both in central Stockholm.

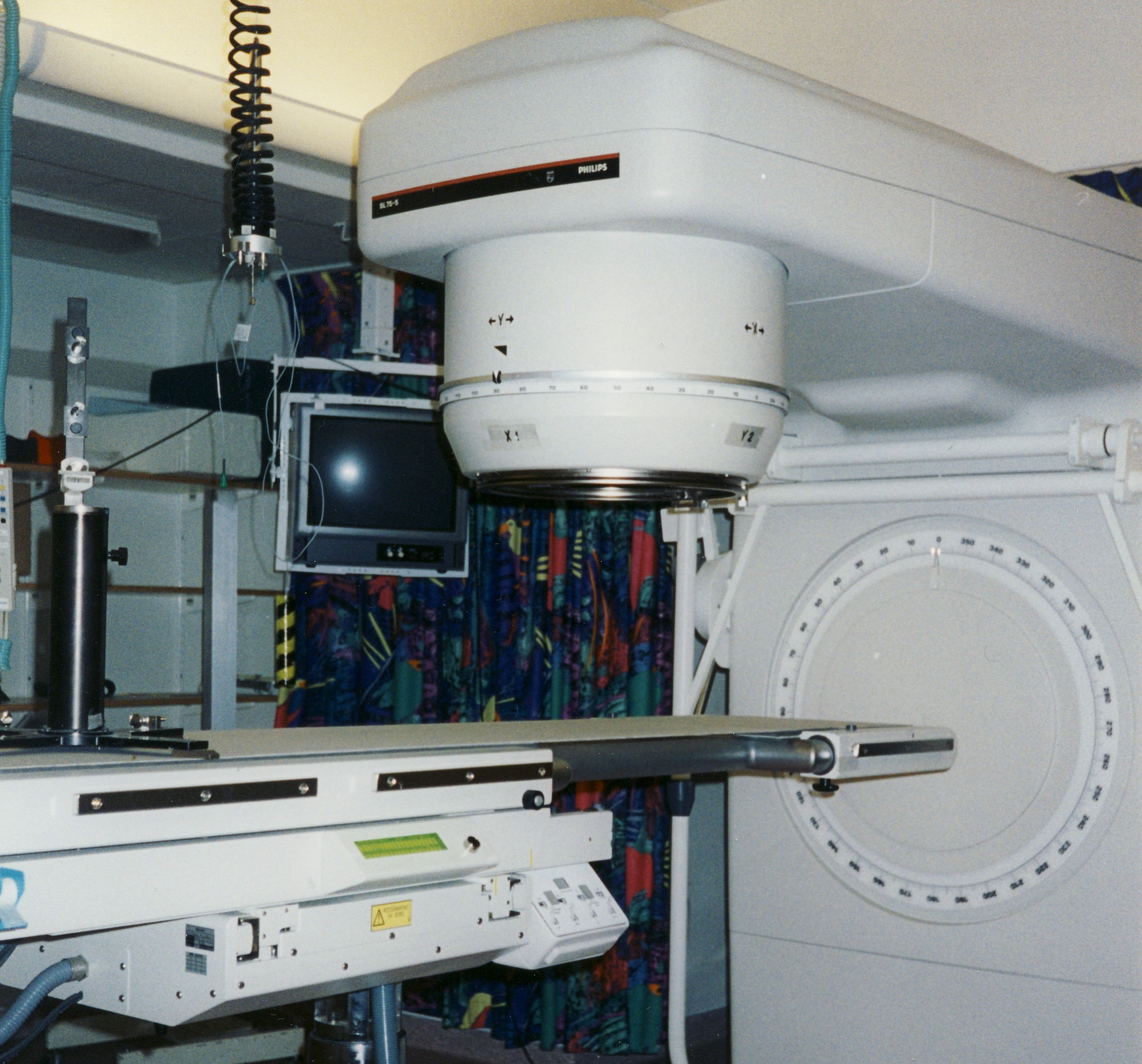
Linear accelerator at Radiumhemmet, photographed in 2000

== Research ==
Radiumhemmet has performed major research in radiology and radiotherapy, particularly in the treatment of gynaecological cancers. Gösta Forssell published the first results in 1909 and they were presented at a conference in Paris the following year. The "Stockholm method" for the treatment of cervical tumours, publicised by Forssell and in a 1915 book by Heyman, was very influential. Radiumhemmet also pioneered careful follow-up of patients, adding an archives and statistics department in 1920; beginning in 1928, this made it possible to present analyses of outcomes for entire cohorts of patients.

On Forssell's 65th birthday in 1941, he was presented with a research fund of 100,000 kronor. The institution also continues to draw on research funds dating back to the original gift by the Svenska Cancerforeningen in 1910 and the endowment from the King Gustav V Jubilee Fund in 1928; Radiumhemmets forskningsfonder distribute 53 million kronor a year as of 2016. In the 1990s they helped establish a new research institute in association with Radiumhemmet, Cancer Centrum Karolinska, founded by its then head, Ulrik Ringborg.
