= Karolinska University Hospital =

- Stockholm County Council

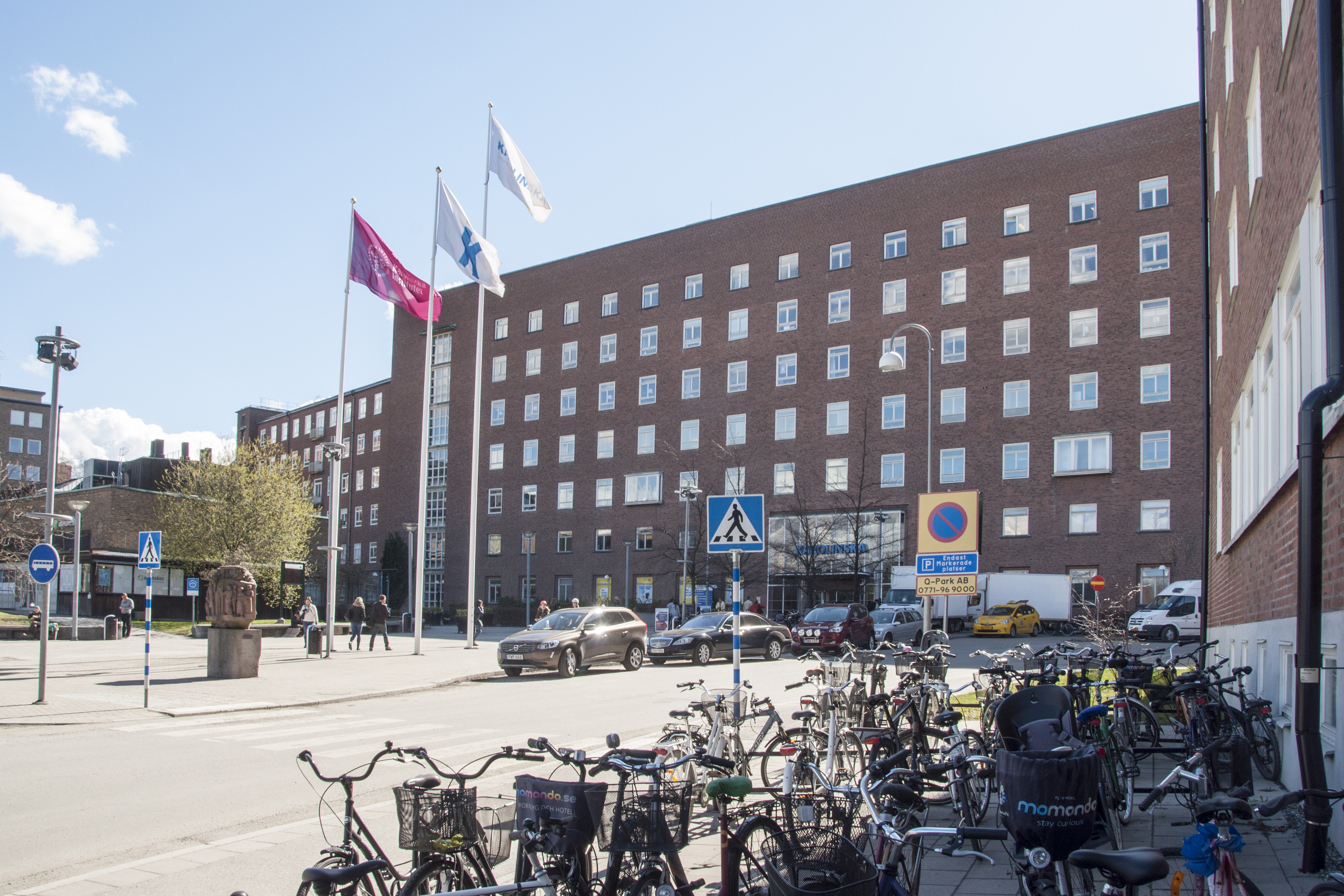
- University Hospital in Solna (Old main entrance Gamla Karolinska)

Geography
- Location: Karolinska Universitetssjukhuset, Solna, 171 76 and Karolinska Universitetssjukhuset, Huddinge, 141 86, Stockholm County, Stockholm, Sweden
- Coordinates: 59°21′08″N 18°01′56″E

Organisation
- Type: Teaching
- Affiliated university: Karolinska Institutet

Services
- Emergency department: Yes
- Beds: 1,340

Helipads
- Helipad: ICAO: ESHK

History
- Founded: 1940

Links
- Website: https://www.karolinskahospital.com
- Lists: Hospitals in Sweden
- Other links: Radiumhemmet

The Karolinska University Hospital (Swedish: Karolinska universitetssjukhuset) is a teaching hospital affiliated with Karolinska Institutet in Stockholm, Sweden, with two major sites in the municipalities of Solna and Huddinge. The hospital network is the second largest in Sweden, after the Sahlgrenska University Hospital.

The present day Karolinska University Hospital is the result of a 2004 merger between the former Huddinge University Hospital (Huddinge universitetssjukhus) in Huddinge, south of Stockholm, and the Karolinska Hospital (Karolinska sjukhuset) in Solna, north of Stockholm. The new hospital has about 15,000 employees and 1,340 patient beds. The Karolinska University Hospital is closely affiliated with the Karolinska Institutet. It incorporates the Astrid Lindgren Children's hospital in Solna and the Children's Hospital in Huddinge.

Since 2021, the hospital network has consistently ranked among the top 10 hospitals in the world according to Newsweek.

== New Karolinska Solna ==
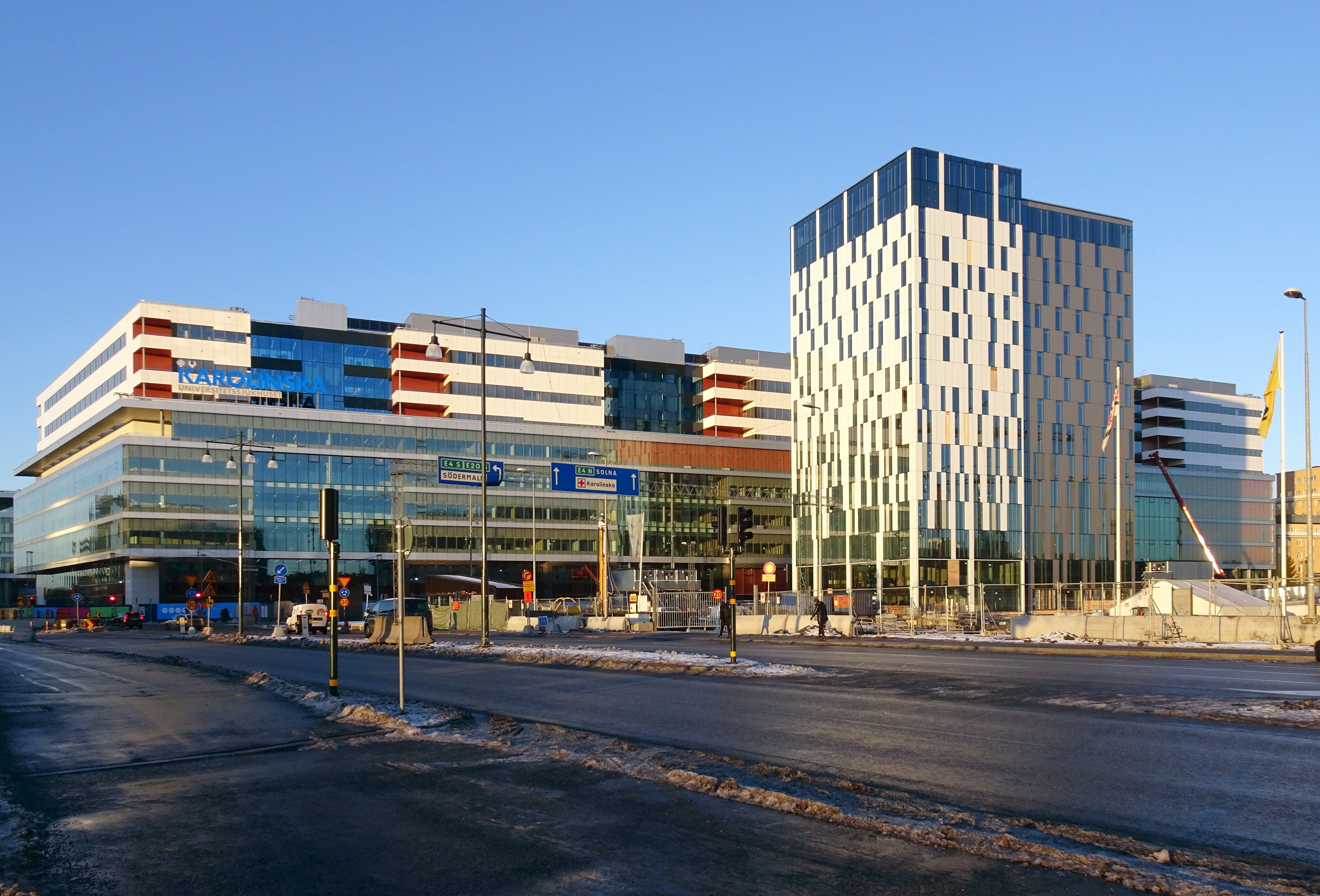
New Karolinska Solna University Hospital can be seen under construction in December 2016

The New Karolinska Solna (NKS) (Swedish: Nya Karolinska Solna) was the name of the construction project aimed at creating a new modern hospital complex for the Karolinska University Hospital. NKS is sometimes mistakenly used as a name for Karolinska University Hospital in Solna, but it is just the name for the building project replacing some of the old hospital buildings in Solna.

In April 2008, the decision was made by the Stockholm County Council to modernize the Karolinska University Hospital in Solna. To construct a new hospital building was considered to be more cost effective, compared to renovating and refurbishing the old facilities, spread over a large area in more than 40 buildings. In June 2008, it was decided that the new university hospital will be built using a public–private partnership model which includes also financing as well as management of the building after the completion.

The project, however, was met with controversy, and the process for planning and building the hospital has been heavily criticized for poor construction planning, execution, management and corruption.

The first departments to move into the new hospital building in 2016 were the cardiovascular and pediatric services. The relocation of healthcare operations from the old classic brick buildings to the new building was completed in October 2018.

It is considered one of the most expensive buildings in the world.

== Gallery ==
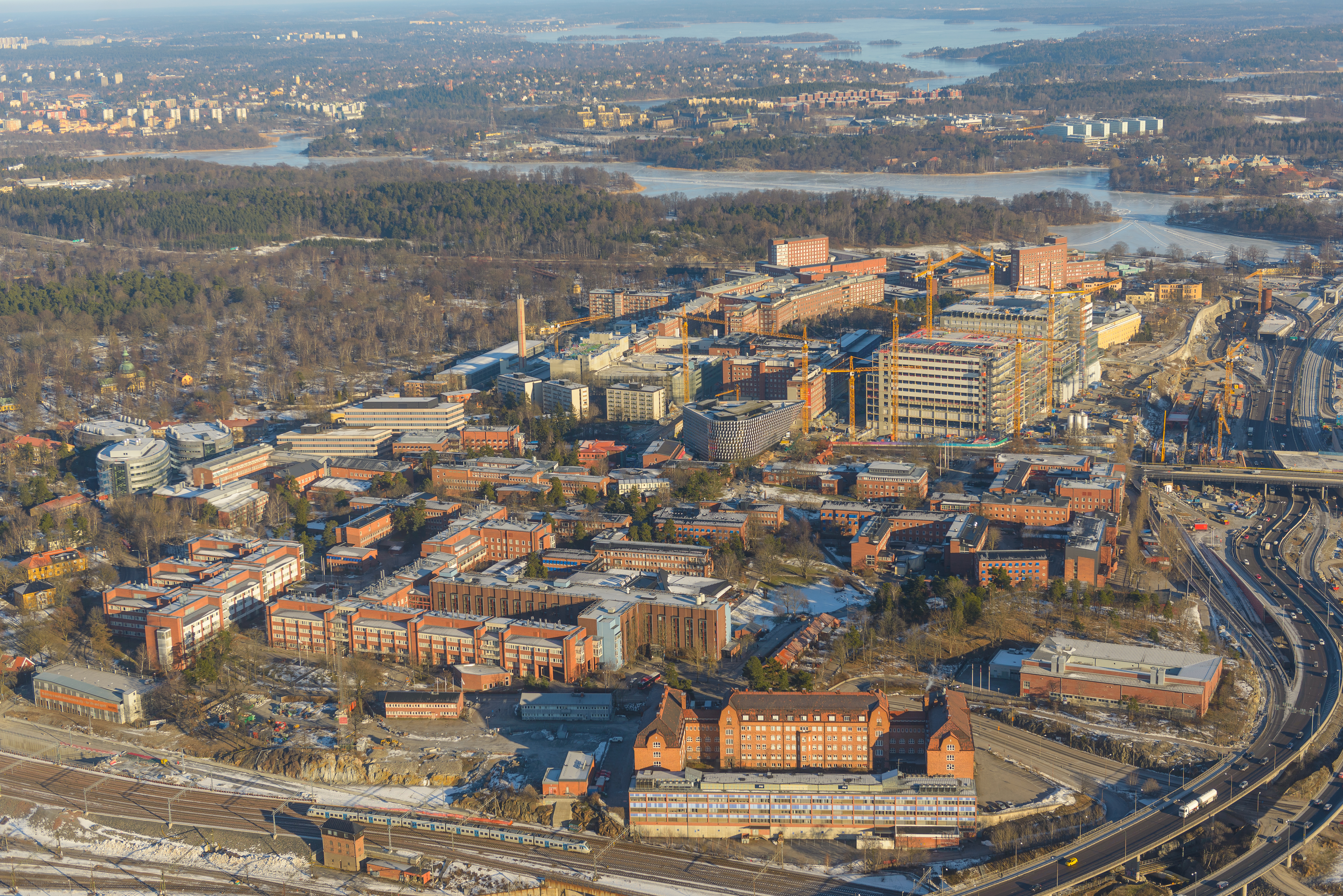
Karolinska University Hospital at KI Campus Solna

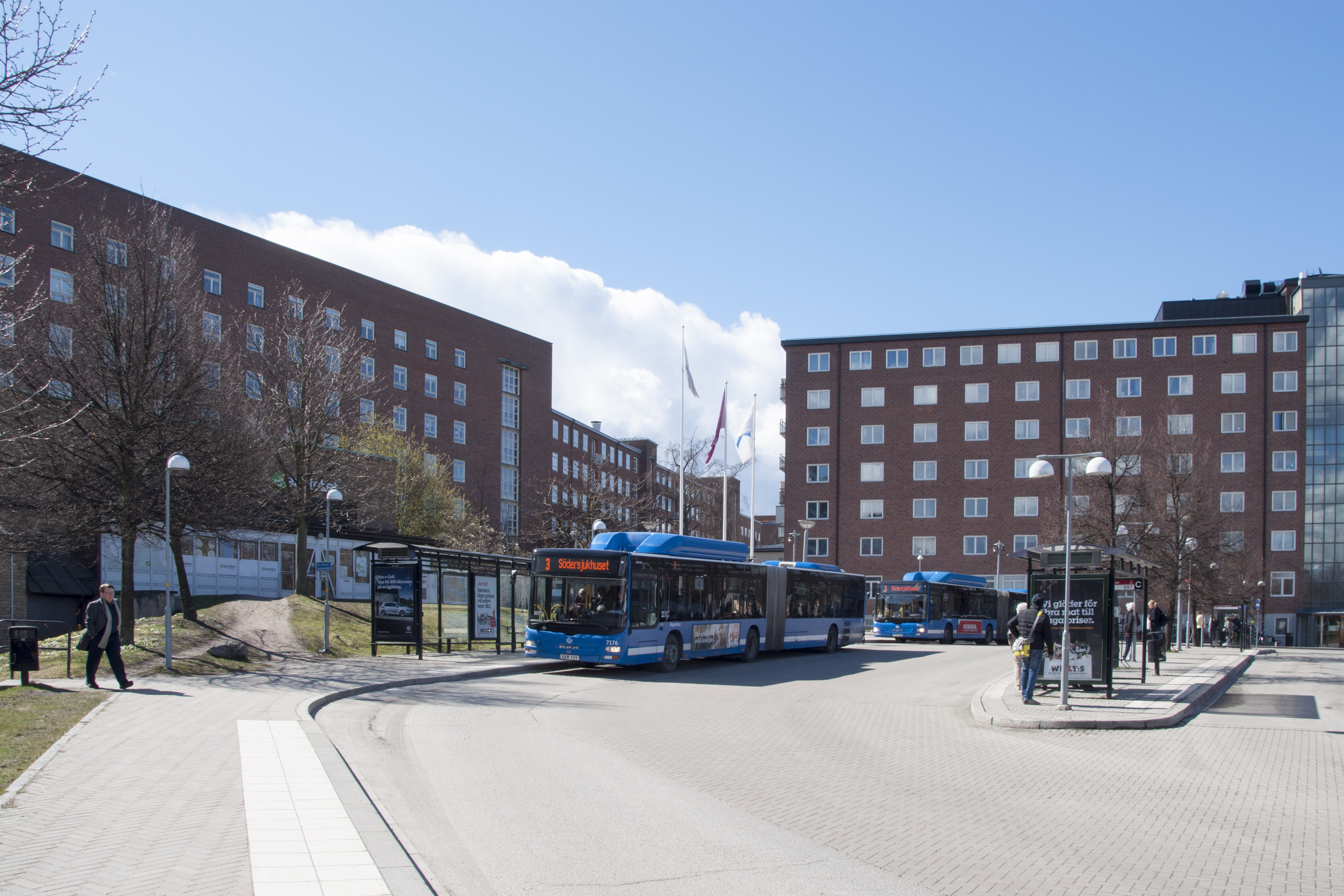
Main entrance to the hospital in Solna

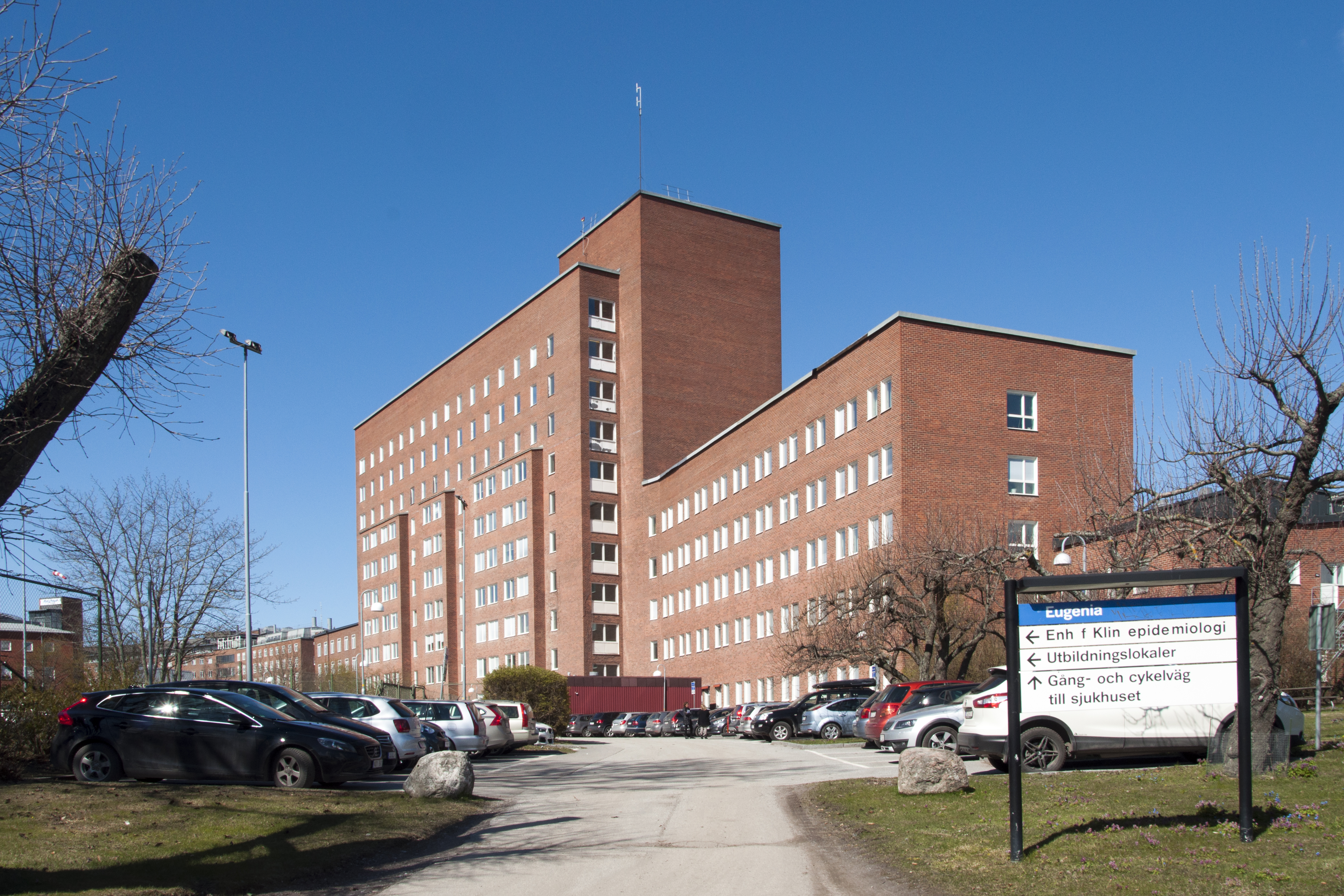
Department of Clinical Neuroscience

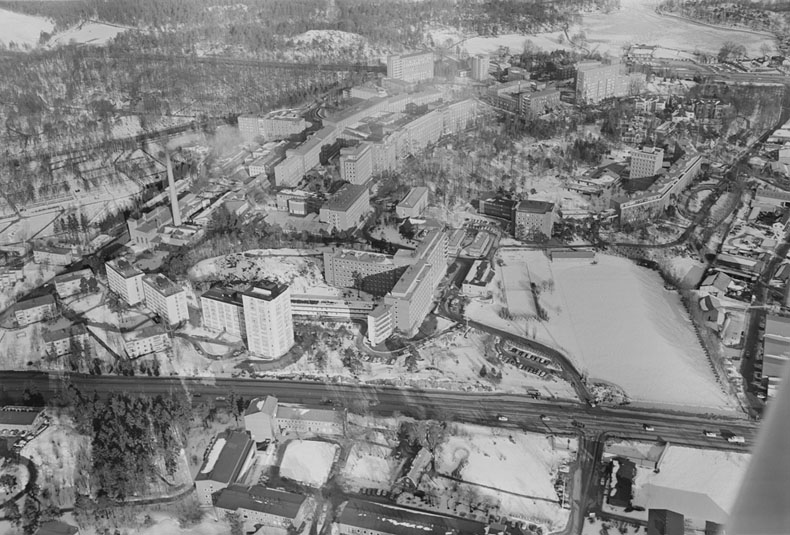
Solna Campus in 1967

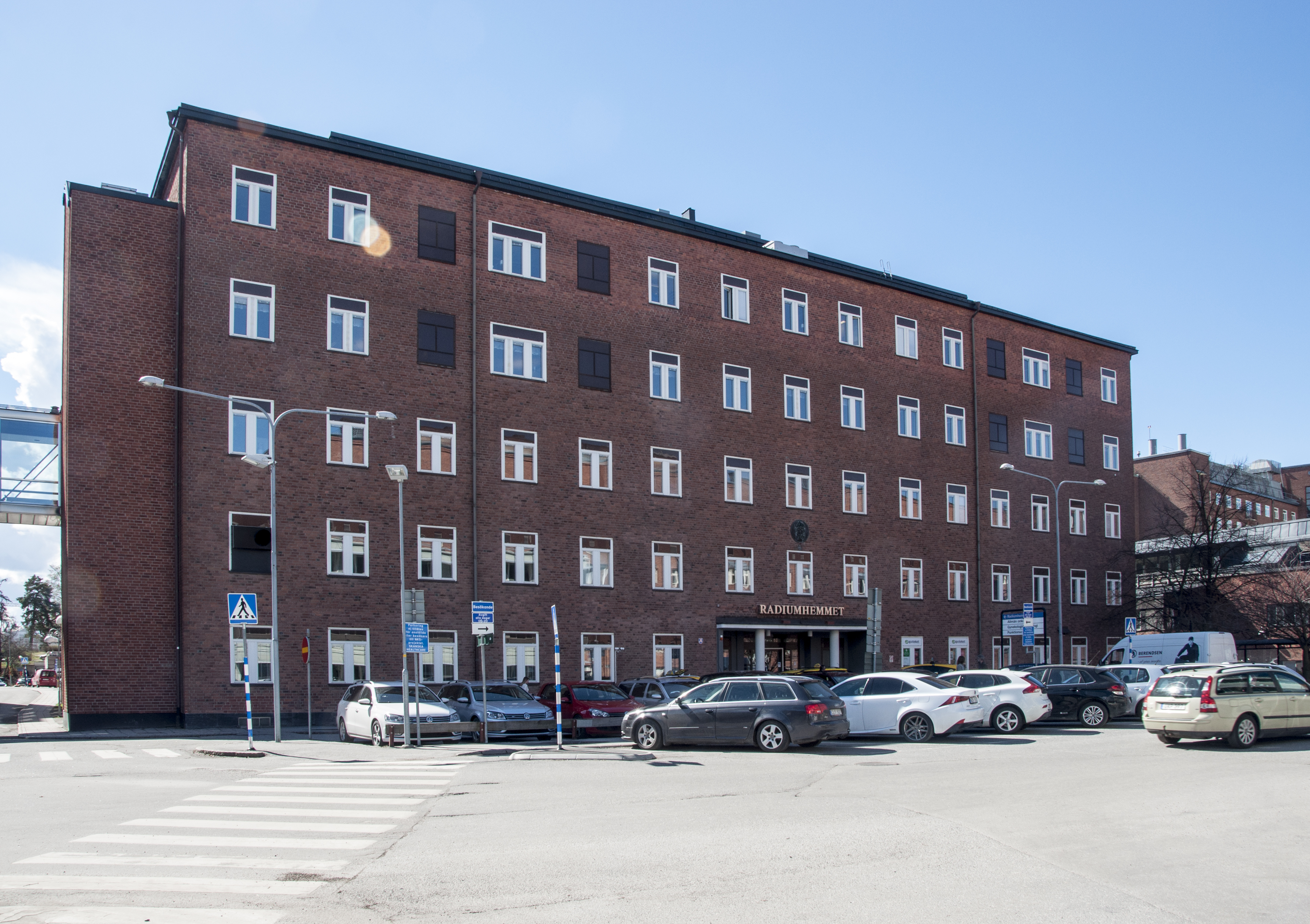
Radiumhemmet

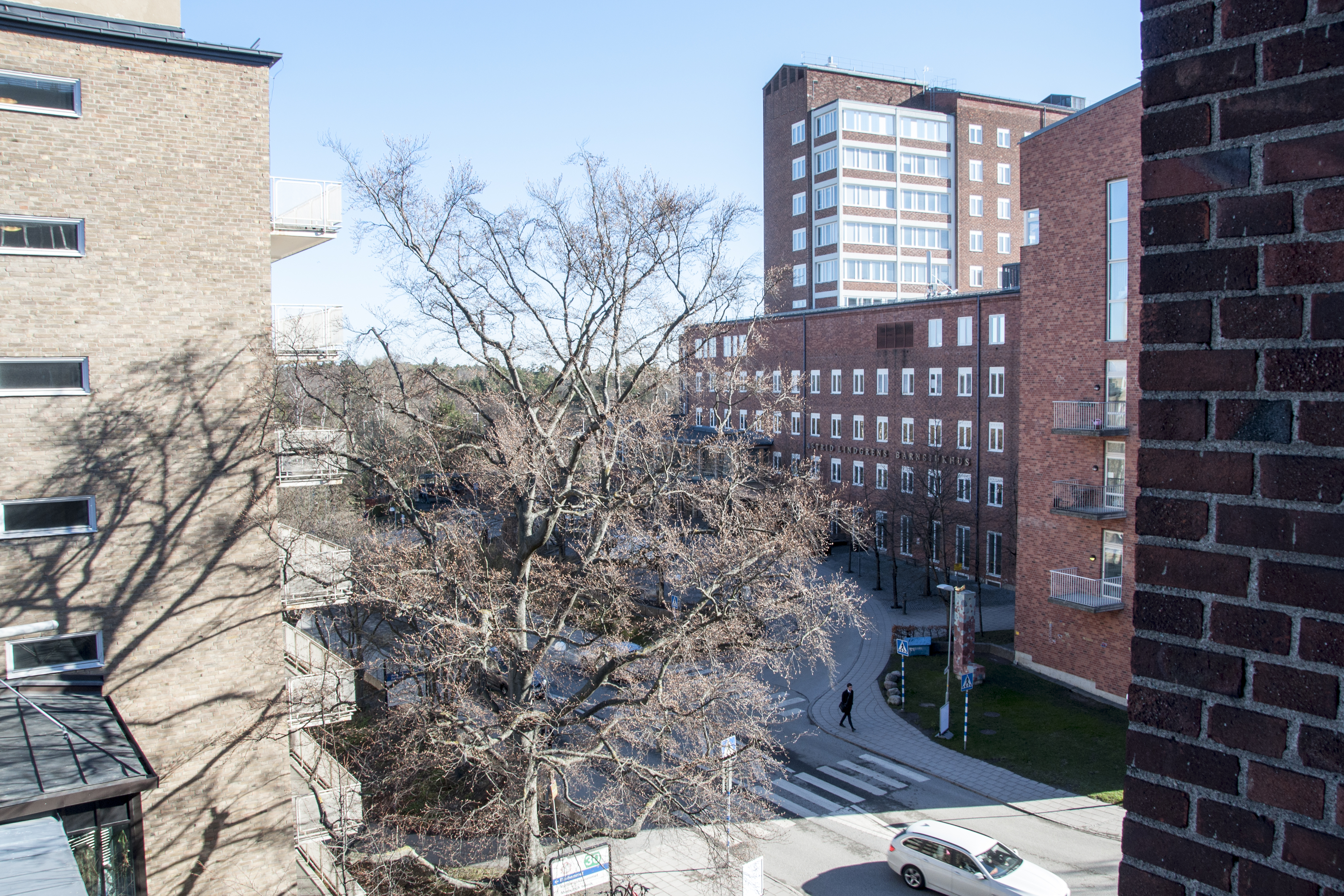
Astrid Lindgren Children's Hospital

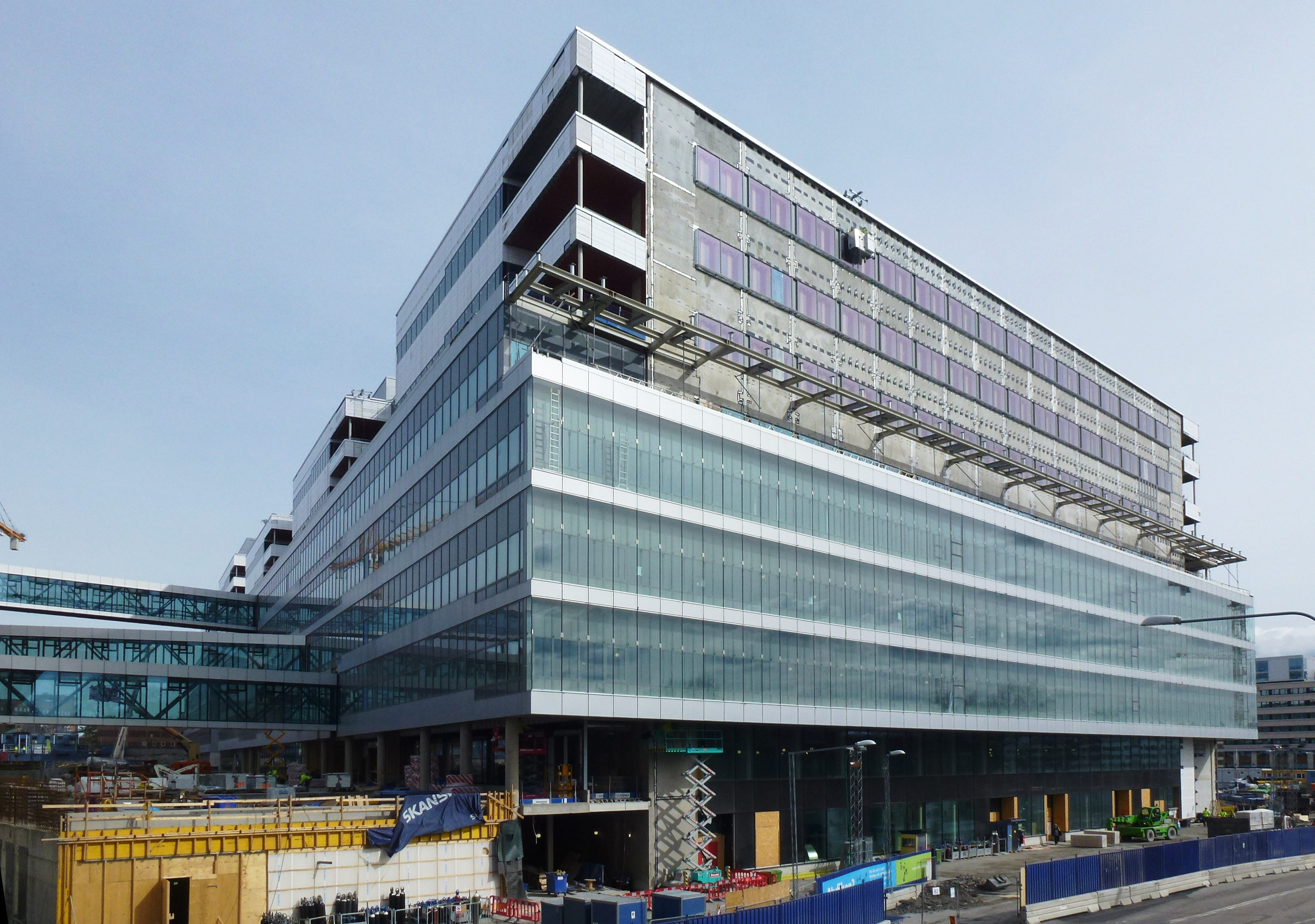
New Karolinska Solna under construction

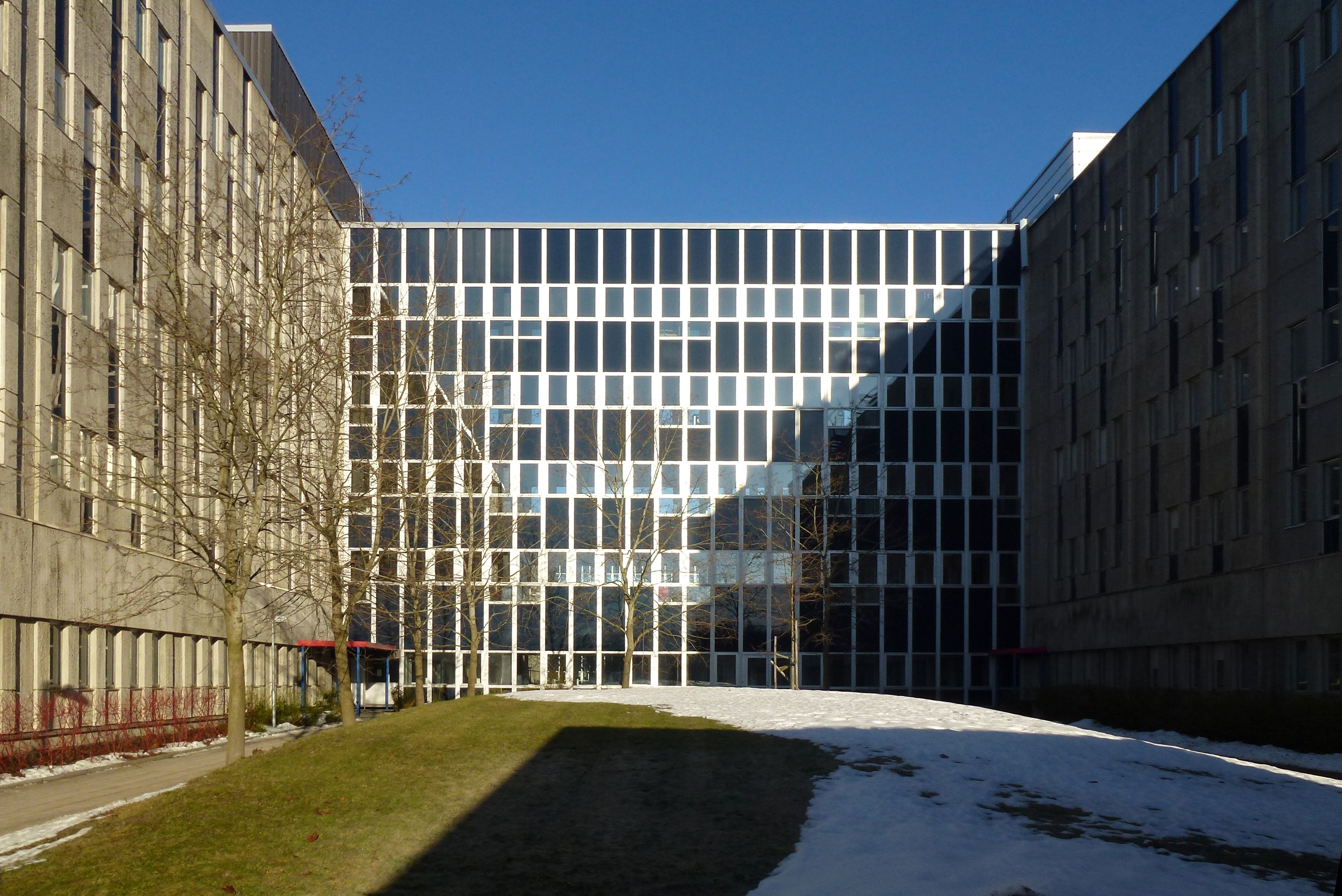
Karolinska University Hospital in Huddinge (Flemingsberg Campus)

== See also ==
- Sahlgrenska University Hospital
- Uppsala University Hospital
- Umeå University Hospital
