= COVID-19 pandemic in Sweden =

- Map of confirmed cases in Sweden (per 100,000 residents)

- Map of confirmed cases in Sweden (absolute numbers)

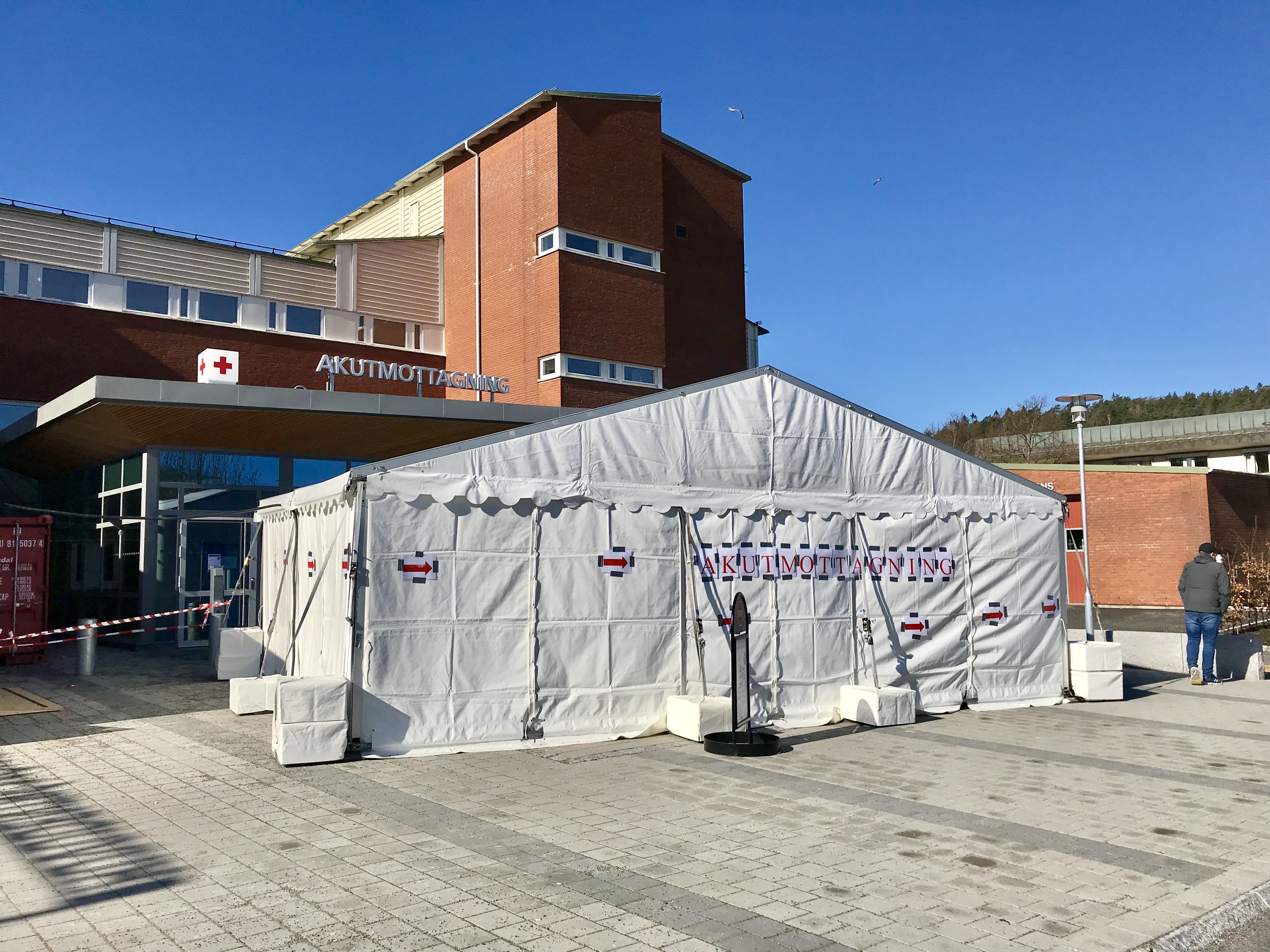
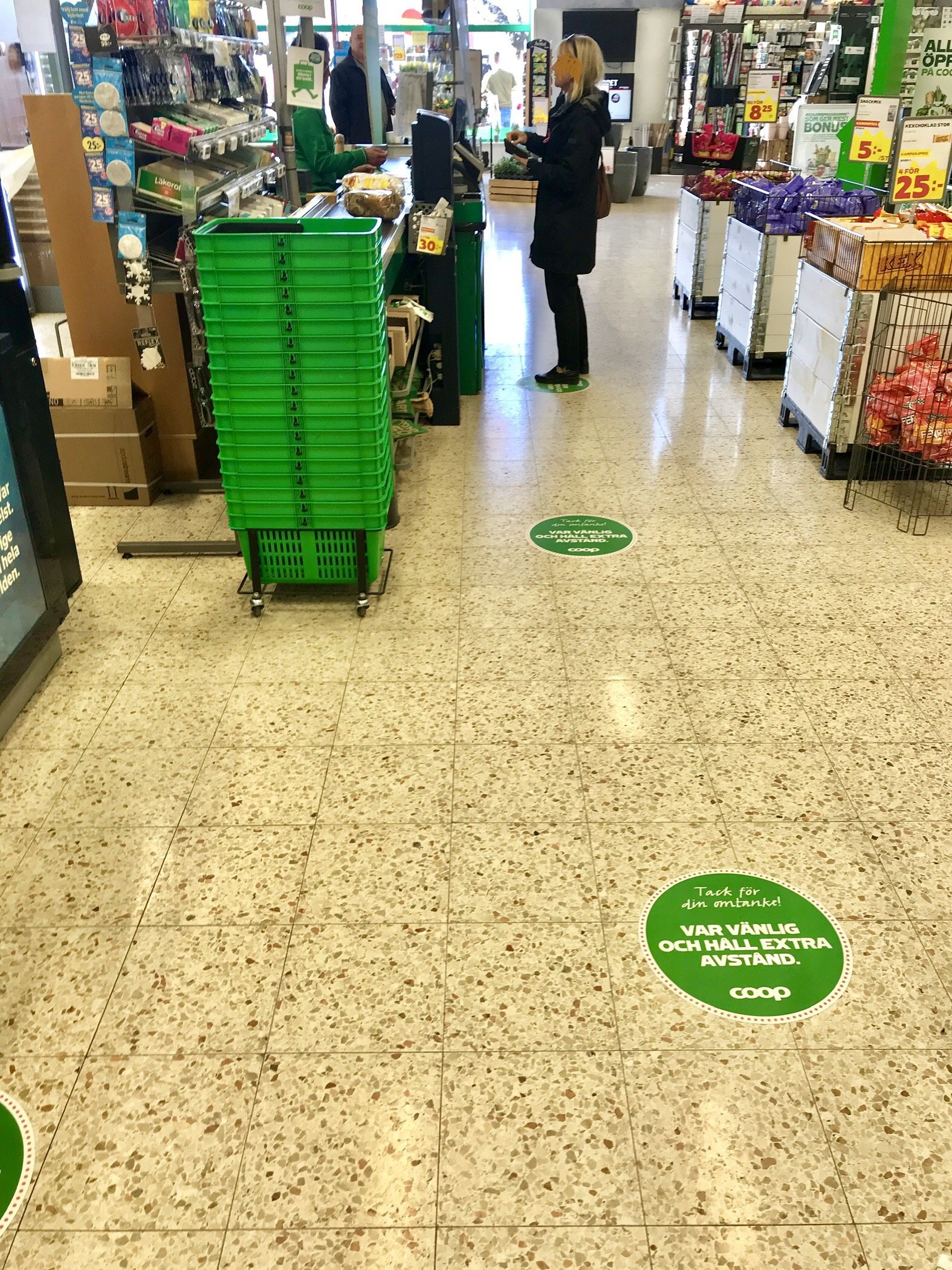
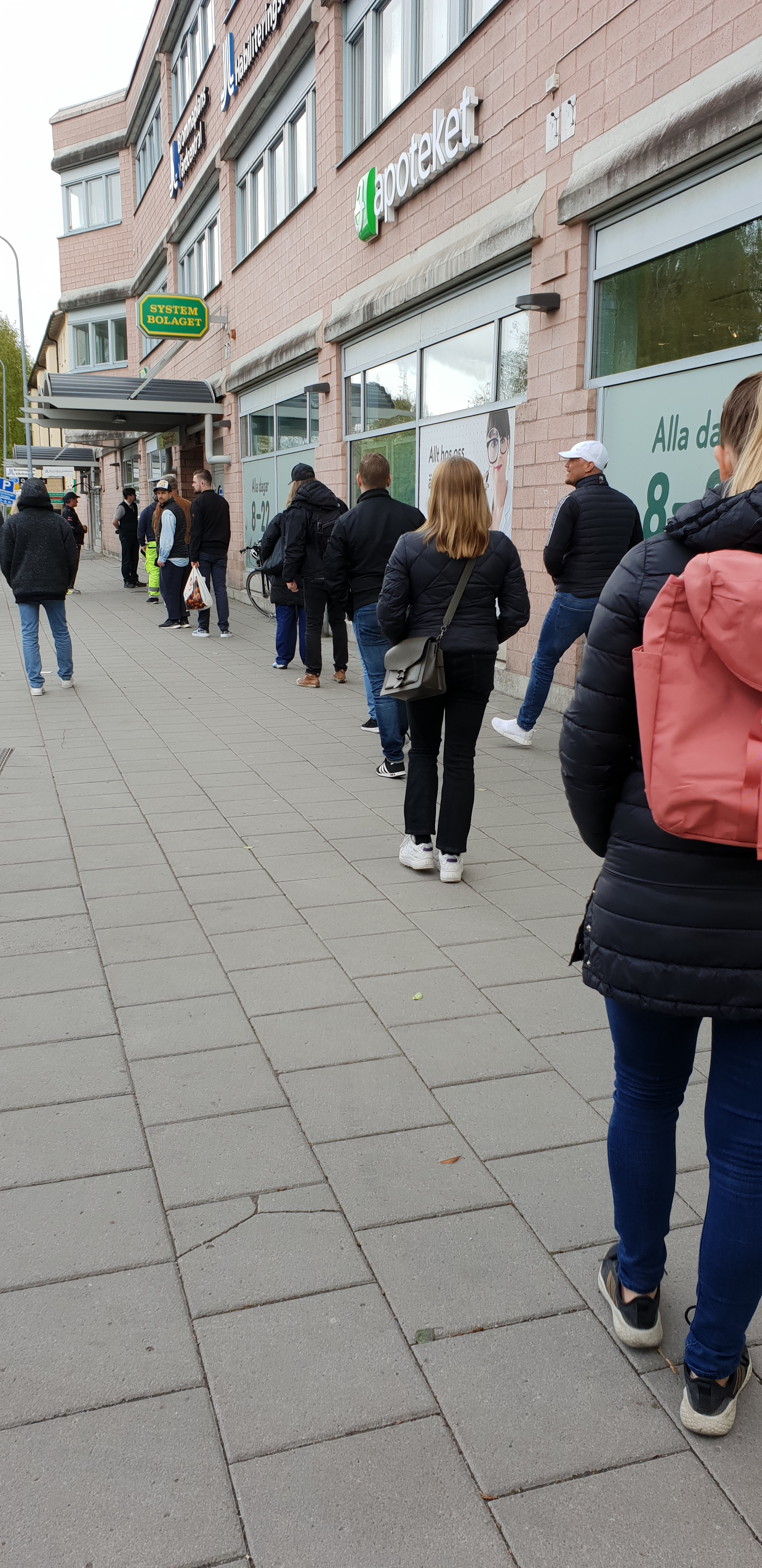
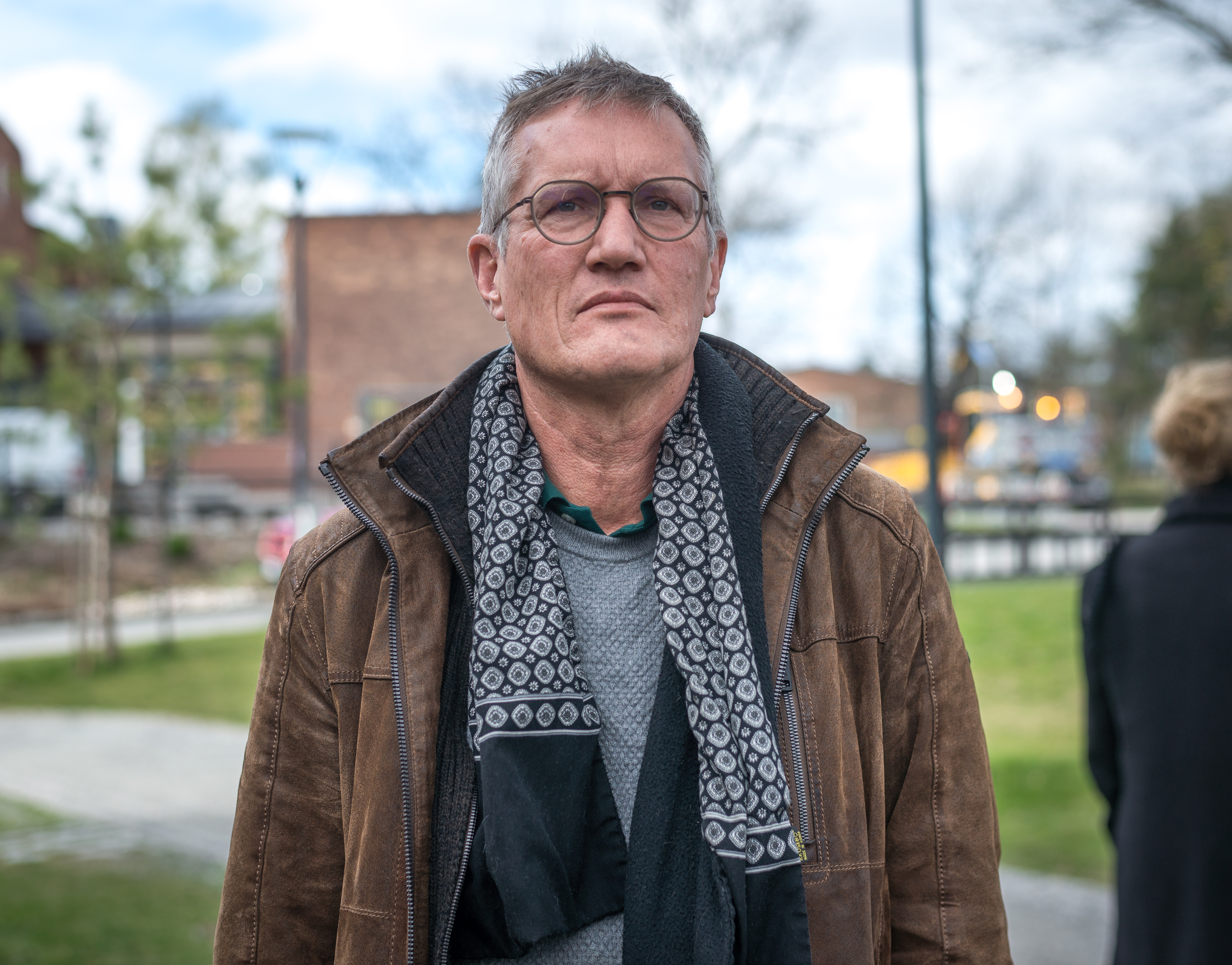
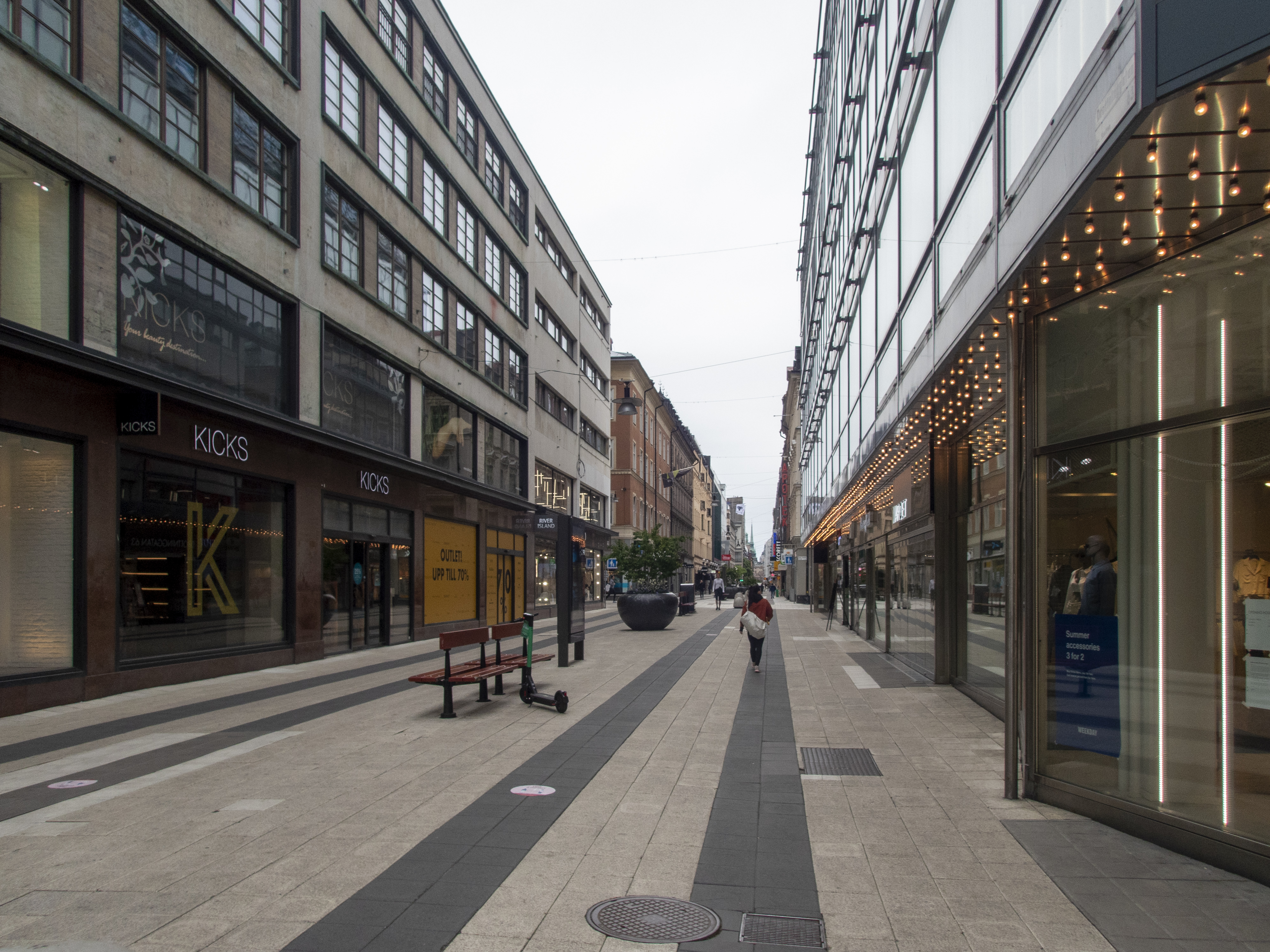
- (left-to-right, from top): Sahlgrenska University Hospital in Mölndal; Signs on the floor at the checkout in Coop, Åmål, to facilitate social distancing; People queuing with 1.5-meter distance outside Systembolaget; State epidemiologist Anders Tegnell; An empty Drottninggatan, a usually busy pedestrian street in Stockholm
- Disease: COVID-19
- Pathogen: SARS-CoV-2
- Location: Sweden
- First outbreak: Wuhan, Hubei, China
- Index case: Jönköping
- Arrival date: 24 January 2020 (6 years, 9 months and 3 days)
- Date: As of 22 March 2023
- Confirmed cases: 2,701,192
- Severe cases: 10,098 ICU hospitalisations (total)
- Deaths: 23,851 (Note: Data on new deaths is compiled by the Public Health Agency of Sweden at 11:30 CEST (UTC+02:00) each day from the communicable disease surveillance system SmiNet. Reports of new deaths to the Public Health Agency might be delayed by up to several days, especially around weekends, possibly introducing delays in reported number of cases for the last few days. In mid-April, approximately 30% of the cases were reported within 24 hours, 50% within 48 hours, and 90% within one week. Data from the Health Agency includes all deaths where a COVID-19 diagnosis had been confirmed (U07.1) during the past 30 days, including cases where the cause of death was not attributed to COVID-19 (as of data from the National Board of Health and Welfare from 21 April, this number amounted to 4.5% of cases confirmed in a laboratory), but excludes non-confirmed cases (U07.2). On 12 May 87% of the deaths attributed to COVID-19 were not confirmed in a laboratory. As this only includes cases confirmed in a laboratory, the actual number is believed to be higher due to the number of laboratory-confirmed cases only amounting to 83% (as of 31 May) of an excess mortality observed in Sweden since late March, according to a statistical analysis by the Public Health Agency based on data from the Swedish Tax Agency and the European mortality monitoring activity (EuroMOMO). By late May, there had been approximately 4,800 excess deaths in Sweden.)

Government website
- Swedish Public Health Agency Covid-19 (in Swedish)

The COVID-19 pandemic in Sweden is a part of the pandemic of coronavirus disease 2019 (COVID-19) caused by severe acute respiratory syndrome coronavirus 2 (SARS-CoV-2). As of 22 March 2023, there have been 2,701,192 confirmed cumulative cases and 23,851 deaths with confirmed COVID-19 in Sweden. Sweden ranks 57th in per capita deaths worldwide, and out of 47 European countries, Sweden places 30th. A 2022 estimate of excess mortality during the pandemic using IHME COVID model estimated 18,300 excess deaths during 2020–2021 The Economist model value estimated 13,670 excess deaths between 16th 2020-Mar 6th 2022.

The virus was confirmed to have reached Sweden on 31 January 2020, although some evidence suggests that the virus could have arrived as early as December 2019. Community transmission was confirmed on 9 March in the Stockholm Metropolitan Area, and the first death was reported two days later. It had spread to all regions of Sweden by 13 March 2020. The authorities declared a "late pandemic phase" was beginning in June, but a surge in cases occurred in the winter of 2020. The Alpha variant, Delta variant and Omicron variant spread to Sweden in 2021.

As the outbreak reached Sweden, authorities responded with limited measures, in contrast with lockdowns and legal restrictions introduced in other countries. The Swedish public were expected to follow a series of non-voluntary recommendations (Note: A Swedish government agency is an independent body with delegated power to pass binding regulations as well as recommendations on how someone can or should act to meet a law or binding regulation within the agency's area of activity (in this case The Swedish Communicable Diseases Act). Although there is not a legal framework for a governmental agency to impose sanctions on someone for going against its recommendations, they are not optional as they work as guidelines on how to act to follow a law or regulation (in this case an obligation to help halting the spread of an infectious disease). The Swedish Constitution prohibits ministerial rule – politicians overruling the advice from its agencies is extremely unusual in Sweden – and mandates that the relevant government body, in this case an expert agency – the Public Health Agency – must initiate all actions to prevent the virus' spread in accordance with Swedish law, rendering state epidemiologist Anders Tegnell a central figure in the crisis.) from the Public Health Agency of Sweden (Folkhälsomyndigheten). These included working from home where possible, limiting travel within the country, social distancing, and for people above 70 and those with potential COVID-19 symptoms to self-isolate. Changes were also made to sick leave. Businesses and organizations were subject to distancing recommendations, regulations (mainly restaurants) and laws (banning public gatherings and events with more than 50 participants, as well as visits to nursing homes). Upper secondary schools and universities were closed until the end of the summer holidays.

From late 2020 amidst a surge in cases, new legislation was passed enacting international travel restrictions and again limiting participation in public events, banning nursing home visits and closing upper secondary schools. Primary schools remained open throughout the pandemic, and face masks were not generally recommended for the public or in healthcare settings. Vaccinations in Sweden began in December 2020. Spring 2021 saw a surge of the Alpha variant of the virus, and further tightening of restrictions and recommendations. In late 2021, vaccine passports and other measures were introduced. On 9 February 2022 almost all regulations and restrictions were abolished, and from 1 April 2022 COVID-19 was no longer classified as dangerous to the general public or society at large (although reporting requirements stayed in place).

The Swedish government's approach has attracted controversy. The impact on the country's healthcare system and its reported death toll have been greater than in other Nordic countries, in part due to its unique strategy. An independent commission that evaluated the response found that Sweden managed to keep excess mortality lower than 31 other European countries, but also said that it failed to protect care home residents due to the overall spread of the virus in society and that the response overall was "slow" and "insufficient". A self-organized group of 40 Swedish scientists and medical professionals had also called for stricter preventative measures throughout the pandemic.

The pandemic put the Swedish healthcare system under severe strain, with tens of thousands of operations being postponed, and only emergency and COVID-related care being available during a surge in the winter of 2020. Initially, Swedish hospitals and other facilities reported a shortage of personal protective equipment. Swedish hospitals were able to increase their intensive care capacity during the earlier stages of the pandemic, but Stockholm's health system still became seriously overwhelmed during the winter surge, with intensive care bed occupancy reaching 99% by 18 December 2020 and the city experiencing healthcare staff shortages. The pandemic and associated restrictions also impacted Sweden's economy, transportation sector, education and arts and entertainment.

== Background ==
=== Outbreak of a novel coronavirus disease ===
On 12 January, the World Health Organization (WHO) confirmed that a novel coronavirus (nCoV) was the cause of a respiratory illness in a cluster of people in Wuhan, Hubei, China, who had initially come to the WHO's attention on 31 December 2019. This cluster was initially linked to the Huanan Seafood Wholesale Market in Wuhan City. A few days later, on 16 January, the Public Health Agency of Sweden issued a press release highlighting the discovery of the novel coronavirus, and the agency monitoring the situation. The risk of spread to Sweden was described as "very low" as there was yet no evidence that the virus could spread between humans, but they recommended that individuals developing cough or fever after visiting Wuhan should seek medical care, and asked for healthcare professionals to be observant.

After the World Health Organization classified the novel Coronavirus as a Public Health Emergency of International Concern on 30 January and demanded that all member states should cooperate to prevent further spread of the virus, the Agency requested for the Swedish government to classify the novel disease as a notifiable infectious disease in the Swedish Communicable Diseases Act as both dangerous to public health (allmänfarlig) and dangerous to society (samhällsfarlig), where contact tracing is required, giving the disease the same legislative status as Ebola, SARS and smallpox. The agency also announced that they have analysing methods that can diagnose a case of the novel disease 'within hours' after testing, and that such tests had already been carried out, but that all had turned out negative.

=== Planning ===
Following the 2005 outbreak of the H5N1 avian flu, Sweden drafted their first national pandemic plan which since then had undergone several revisions. Since a 2008 revision to prepare for the 2009 swine flu pandemic, the plan includes the formation of a National Pandemic Group (NPG) in the event of a possible pandemic. The group involves several Swedish government agencies and defines each agency's role.

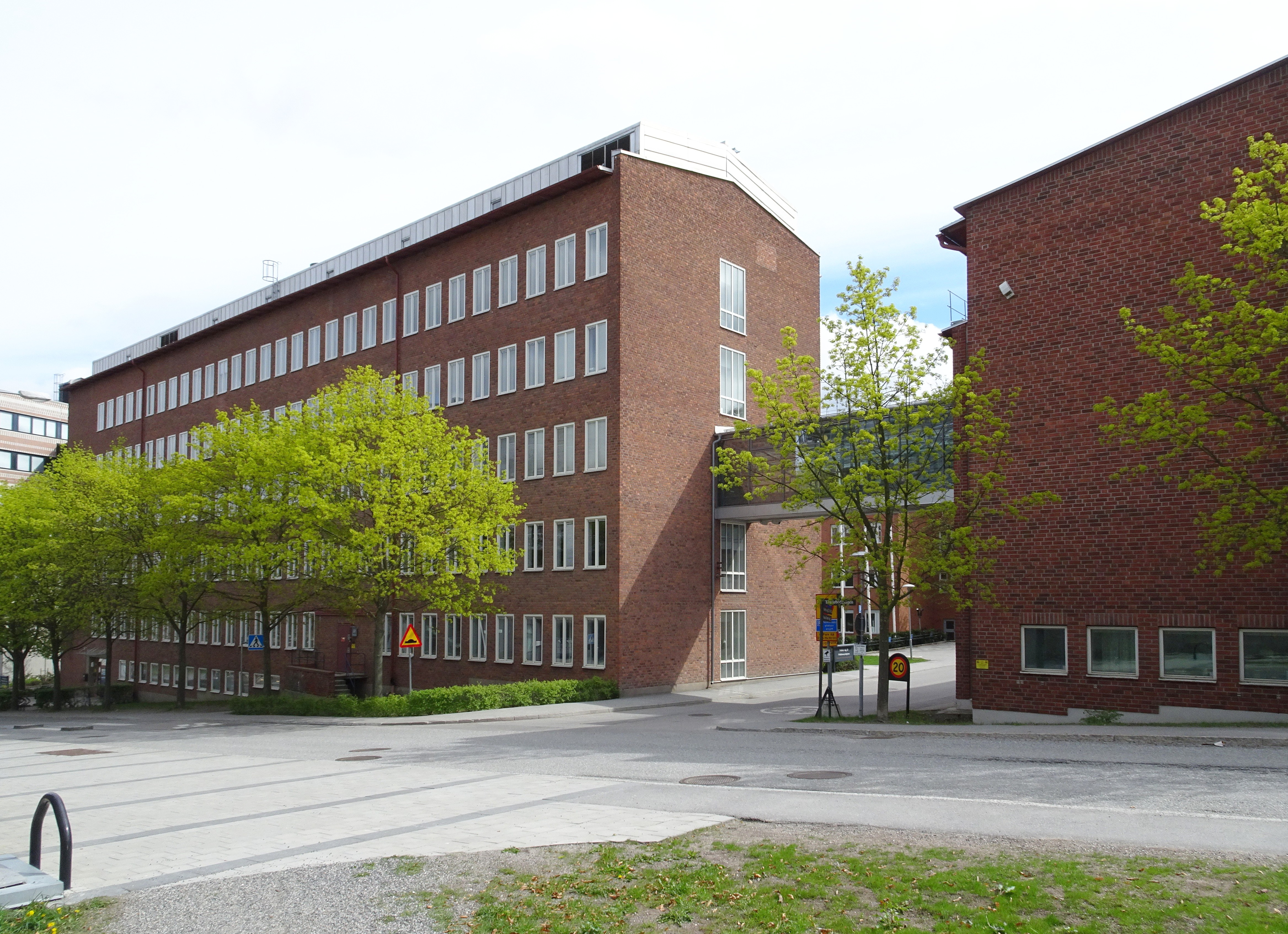
The Public Health Agency

The plan states that the Public Health Agency of Sweden will be the expert agency responsible for monitoring diseases with a pandemic potential, and with the mandate to assemble the National Pandemic Group to coordinate pandemic preparations and strategies on a national level between the relevant agencies. The pandemic group includes four additional Swedish government agencies: the Swedish Civil Contingencies Agency, the Swedish Medical Products Agency, the Swedish National Board of Health and Welfare and the Swedish Work Environment Authority, as well as the county administrative boards of Sweden and the employer's organisation Swedish Association of Local Authorities and Regions.

Swedish crisis management is built on a principle of responsibility which means that the organisation who is responsible for an area of activity under normal circumstances is also responsible for that area of activity during a crisis. As the Public Health Agency of Sweden, headed by director general Johan Carlson, is the agency responsible of monitoring and preventing the spread of infectious diseases, the agency had a central role in the Swedish response to the pandemic. The Public Health Agency also tasked with having a coordinating role for the national response to a pandemic according to the National Pandemic Plan, together with the Swedish Civil Contingencies Agency headed by Dan Eliasson and the Swedish National Board of Health and Welfare headed by Olivia Wigzell.

=== Preparedness ===
In risk and impact assessments by the Swedish Civil Contingencies Agency, the Swedish expert agency on crisis management, the risk of Sweden in the future being affected by a severe pandemic was assessed as "high" with a "catastrophic" impact on human health and economics. They believed that a future pandemic would be inevitable within 5–50 years.

In the 2019 Global Health Security Index of the 'most prepared' countries in the world for an epidemic or a pandemic published by the Johns Hopkins Center for Health Security, Sweden was ranked 7th overall. Sweden received high rankings regarding prevention of the emergence of a new pathogen, early detection and reporting of an epidemic of international concern and having a low risk environment. However, the Swedish healthcare system received a lower score, questioning if it was sufficient and robust enough to treat the sick and protect health workers. (Note: The index is based on 140 questions, grouped into 85 subindicators, 34 indicators and 6 categories, with countries being ranked overall and for each category; Prevention: Prevention of the emergence or release of pathogens (Sweden ranked 2nd), Detection and Reporting: Early detection and reporting for epidemics of potential international concern (7th), Rapid Response: Rapid response to and mitigation of the spread of an epidemic (14th), Health System: Sufficient and robust health system to treat the sick and protect health workers (20th), Compliance with International Norms: Commitments to improving national capacity, financing plans to address gaps, and adhering to global norms (11th), and Risk Environment: Overall risk environment and country vulnerability to biological threats (6th)) In 2013, the Swedish Civil Contingencies Agency investigated Sweden's ability to cope with a pandemic through a simulation where a severe avian influenza infects a third of the population, out of which 190,000 gets severely ill, and up to 10,000 die from the disease. They concluded that Sweden was generally well prepared, with pandemic plans on both national and regional level, but that the health-care system would be the weak link. They noted that Swedish hospitals were already under heavy burden, and would not have the capacity to treat everyone who become sick, even when alternative facilities (like schools and sports centres) were used as hospitals. They also pointed out that issues concerning prioritising, including triage, would become central during the crisis, and that they believed this subject needed to be addressed. Before the outbreak of the new coronavirus, Sweden had a relatively low number of hospital beds per capita, with 2.2 beds per 1000 people (2017), and intensive care unit (ICU) beds per capita of 5.8 per 100.000 people (2012). Both numbers were lower than most countries' in the EU. The total number of ICU beds in Swedish hospitals was 526.

By the time of the Fall of the Berlin Wall, the Swedish Defence Forces was equipped with a total of 35 field hospitals, with what some considered to be the most modern battlefield medicine in the world, with the Swedish Navy having an additional 15 hospitals. The field hospitals had a combined capacity of treating 10.000 patients and performing 1000 surgeries every 24 hours, as well as stockpiles with drugs, medical supplies and personal protective equipment to treat 150.000 war casualties. Additionally, the Swedish state had several preparedness hospitals and Swedish schools were constructed to be converted into hospital units in case of a military conflict and with a total capacity of treating 125.000 patients, supported by a network of preparedness storages containing medicine and medical equipment. From 1990 and onwards, the system was gradually dismantled to eventually disappear altogether, with the equipment, including more than 600 new ventilators, being either given away or disposed of. At the start of the 2020 COVID-19 pandemic, the Swedish Defence Forces owned 2 medical units with a total of 96 beds, out of which 16 were ICU beds, and there were no civil preparedness storages for medical equipment left in Sweden.

Until 2009, the Swedish state-run pharmacy chain Apoteket had the responsibility to ensure drug supply in case of emergency. Following a very controversial privatisation, the responsibility was handed over to the private sector, with the intent that these chains would have a profit-based incentive to aid in medicine preparedness. However, a lack of regulations and lack of government action meant that the private companies had no incentive or responsibility to maintain stocks of medication in the event of a crisis, effectively leaving Sweden without an entity responsible for medicine preparedness. At the start of the pandemic, the Swedish healthcare system were instead relying on a "just-in-time" deliveries of medication and medical equipment, and Sweden had no medicine manufacturing of its own, which was considered to make the country's drug supply vulnerable as it relied on global trade and long supply lines. The Swedish healthcare system was already experiencing a growing number of backordered drugs in the years leading up to the pandemic. The lack of medicine preparedness had been strongly criticised in several inquiries and reports since 2013 by a number of Swedish governmental agencies, including the Swedish National Audit Office, the Swedish Defence Research Agency and the Swedish Civil Contingencies Agency. The latter had regarded disturbances in the drug supply as one of their biggest concerns in their annual risk assessments.

== Timeline ==
=== Early cases (December 2019 – February 2020) ===
On 31 January 2020, the first Swedish case was confirmed in a woman in Jönköping who had travelled to Sweden directly from Wuhan, China, on 24 January 2020. The case was fully isolated and there are no reports of further spread. It is believed that the virus could have reached Sweden as early as December 2019, when several individuals sought care at a primary care clinic in Svärdsjö, Falun Municipality, with signs of respiratory disease, as all of them had been in contact with an individual with a recent travel history to Wuhan, and later tested positive for antibodies against the disease. There is however no evidence of further spread in connection with those early cases.

The second confirmed case was diagnosed at Sahlgrenska University Hospital, Gothenburg, on 26 February 2020, after a man who had recently returned from northern Italy following the outbreak in the country had developed symptoms. With five additional cases confirmed on 27 February, the Public Health Agency put out a statement that these cases were all related to travel to high-risk zones and that there was no evidence of community transmission. Disease control measures, including extensive contact tracing, turned up over 200 travel-related cases in the following weeks, all with connection to confirmed cases or travel to high risk regions. Many of those who tested positive for the virus during this early stage of the outbreak in Sweden had been infected while on vacation in Italy during the one-week spring break in late February.

During the four-week period from February to March in which the spring break takes place in different areas of Sweden, around one million Swedes (about one tenth of the total population) had travelled abroad. Testing was initially primarily done on individuals who had developed symptoms after travelling from the areas hardest hit by the outbreak, such as China, Iran, northern Italy, Tyrol and South Korea, or those with pneumonia of unknown cause. Subsequent whole genome sequencing studies carried out by the Public Health Agency proved that disease control measures including isolation and contact tracing had been largely successful in preventing the infection to spread from Italy.

The studies also revealed that early assumptions that Swedes returning from Northern Italy and Tyrol were the main drivers of the outbreak in Sweden were incorrect, as the virus had likely been brought to Sweden by "hundreds" of different people from a range of countries, as the outbreak by that time had "gone under the radar" in many other parts of the world and that other countries already had a large spread.

Analysis of early Swedish cases suggested that several early cases had carried the virus from the United Kingdom and the United States, as well as from France and the Netherlands. From the start of the outbreak in Sweden, Stockholm County saw a significantly higher number of cases in the Stockholm Metropolitan Area compared to other counties of Sweden, including the densely populated regions Scania and Västra Götaland. According to Johan Carlson, director-general at the Public Health Agency, one reason was believed to be that the Stockholm spring break took place later than in other regions.

On 27 February, Uppsala County confirmed its first case in a woman with a travel history to Germany, where she had met with an Italian colleague, and had been admitted to Uppsala University Hospital after seeking medical attention with flu-like symptoms.

In June, it was discovered that a number of persons in Svärdsjö, Dalarna County, had antibodies against SARS-CoV-2. The individuals had been in contact with a person visiting from Wuhan, China, in December 2019 and sought medical attention after experiencing respiratory symptoms. It is since believed that SARS-CoV-2 came to Sweden as early as December 2019.

=== Community spread (March–September 2020) ===
On 9 March, an infection and a suspected infection were diagnosed in two patients, with no connection between them, who had sought care at S:t Göran Hospital, Stockholm, on 6 March. They were assumed to have been infected through community transmission. The following day, Jämtland and Västernorrland also confirmed initial cases.

Responding to indications of local transmission in the Stockholm area and Västra Götaland, the Public Health Agency on 10 March raised the risk assessment of community spread from moderate to very high, which is the highest level. The first death was reported on 11 March, the same day as the COVID-19 outbreak was declared a pandemic by the WHO, when a person in their 70s from the Stockholm Metropolitan Area died in the intensive care unit of Karolinska University Hospital. The person was reported to have acquired the virus through community transmission, believed to have occurred about one week before death. The person also belonged to a risk group. After the first case in Västmanland County was confirmed on 13 March, the disease had reached all of the 21 regions in Sweden.

The Public Health Agency of Sweden declared on 13 March that stopping the spread of COVID-19 had entered a "new phase" which required "other efforts". The continued focus was now to delay spread among the population and to protect the elderly and most vulnerable against the disease. Contact tracing would no longer be part of the strategy, and testing would instead focus on people already in hospital or those considered to belong to be of a bigger risk of a more severe disease.

The health agency believed that 5–10% of the population in Stockholm County was carrying the virus on 9 April. In mid-April, it was reported that out of the approximately 1,300 people who had died after having caught the virus, one third had been living at nursing homes. The figure differed between the regions. In Stockholm, the city most affected by the pandemic, half of the deaths had been residents in one of its many nursing homes. The situation led to the Health and Social Care Inspectorate to begin carrying out controls at the homes.

According to estimations by the Health Agency in early May, the R value had dropped below 1.0 for the first time on 21 April. In June, the Health Agency declared that several regions had entered a "late pandemic phase" with a decrease in the number of new cases, and called for those regions to return to the strategy of stopping the disease through increased testing and detailed contact tracing.

=== Winter surge ===
Like much of Europe, Sweden experienced a dramatic increase in COVID-19 cases and deaths from October to December 2020. Alcohol sales were banned after 10pm, gatherings were limited to a maximum of eight people and some schools switched to online learning in response.

On 7 December, upper secondary schools in Sweden were switched to distance learning for pupils aged 16 or more. A week later the Stockholm regional disease control unit asked Stockholm's schools to also adopt distance learning for pupils aged 13–15, which became possible on 11 January following a legal decree, and on 18 December Stockholm Region began recommending face masks on public transport for the first time, followed by national recommendations on 7 January, with Sweden having previously been one of the few countries not to recommend them. The health system in Stockholm became particularly overwhelmed, with 99% of intensive care beds full, and private sector staff called to stand in due to staff shortages. Nevertheless, in January 2021 schools reopened.

An independent commission released a report in December which criticized Sweden's approach for failing to protect care home residents by allowing the virus to become widespread.

King Carl XVI Gustaf and Stefan Löfven both characterized Sweden's approach as a 'failure' in December 2020 due to the high number of deaths. Löfven suggested that many experts had failed to predict and prepare for the severity of the increase during the winter. Public approval for Tegnell and the Swedish health authorities also fell to the lowest level since the start of the pandemic, 59%, in response to the surge.

Neighboring Finland and Norway criticized Sweden's approach for potentially undermining their own preventative measures.

COVID-19 vaccination in Sweden began on 27 December 2020.

On 10 January 2021, around 10 months after the outbreak became serious, legislation was passed permitting more restrictions than was possible with existing laws. The new laws allowed limiting number of visitors to shops, in contradiction with previous advice, and the Prime Minister said that a general lockdown was being considered, although was not implemented.

The Alpha variant first identified in the United Kingdom was spreading in the community by early 2021. By 11 February 2021, Sweden had vaccinated over 80% of nursing homes residents with the first dose and about a third with two doses, which the Swedish health agency indicated to be likely responsible for drop in daily new deaths. By 7 April 2021, 93% of nursing home residents had at least one shot and 88% had two doses. For people who are 65 and older and who have home care with personal care, 80% had at least one shot.

=== Subsequent developments (March 2021–2022) ===
The Delta variant began circulating in Sweden in 2021. Starting from 29 September 2021 more pandemic-related restrictions were lifted in Sweden. However, some restrictions and a requirement for vaccine passports for gatherings of over 500 people were introduced in December 2021 in response to an increase in cases due to the Omicron variant.

== Response from the authorities ==
In response to COVID-19, the Public Health Agency of Sweden issued a series of infographics in different languages describing how to protect oneself and others from infection.

Sweden's unique response to the COVID-19 pandemic has been the subject of significant controversy in both domestic and international circles. Unlike most countries, which strongly recommended or introduced widespread sector closures, quarantining, and lockdown measures to curb the spread of the coronavirus disease 2019, the government of Sweden took a more lenient approach to the pandemic, only pursuing social distancing measures such as bans on large gatherings and limited travel restrictions.

Sweden had made preparations for a pandemic in previous years, with the Public Health Agency of Sweden designated as the responsible body in a disease outbreak but without the authority to pass laws itself. In the Swedish political system, the cabinet with legislative authority is mandated to follow the advice of government agencies (in this case the Public Health Agency) and very rarely overrules this, as ministerial governance is prohibited under the Basic Laws of Sweden. Crisis management in Sweden instead follows the "principle of responsibility".

Upon the outbreak of the COVID-19 pandemic, the Public Health Agency initiated contact tracing and outlined its strategy to protect the country's most vulnerable citizens and prevent the health care system from being overwhelmed. As the outbreak spread, the agency advised those with respiratory symptoms to avoid social contacts, work from home if possible, minimise travel, and adhere to social distancing. The government passed a law banning large gatherings, and secondary and higher education institutions were advised to switch to distance education. Press conferences and public communications campaigns were also launched. Unlike most other countries, face masks were not recommended in public or healthcare settings.

On 18 December 2020, Stefan Löfven, the prime minister of Sweden, announced new and tougher restrictions and recommendations including the use of face masks in public transportation and closure of all non-essential public services. In January 2021, a new pandemic law was passed that allows for the use of lockdown measures and legally limited some gatherings. Further measures were introduced in July and December 2021, such as vaccine passports.

Reception for the government's response has been mixed. An independent commission was launched to evaluate the measures taken by the government, the administrative health authorities, and regional municipalities. The commission criticized the response of the government, citing among other things a failure to protect the elderly population, that the Swedish response was marked by slowness, with initial measures "insufficient to stop or even substantially limit the spread of the virus in the country," and that the Swedish healthcare system would face long-term consequences due to "the price of extreme pressure on staff and of cancelled and postponed care." In their final report, the commission described Sweden not introducing lockdowns as "fundamentally correct" for maintaining personal freedoms, but were critical of the decisions not to introduce "more rigorous and intrusive disease prevention and control measures" in February and March 2020.

Sweden's unique approach also became a divisive topic of debate, receiving significant international media coverage and criticism both domestically and internationally, and with those who oppose or support public health restrictions often citing the Swedish response as an example.

== Monitoring and modelling ==
Estimated daily excess deaths in Sweden, Norway, Denmark and Finland between 1 January 2020 and 28 March 2022 using The Economist modelling.

In early March, the Health Agency expanded the sentinel surveillance system in use for monitoring the influenza season, so that samples from patients with flu-like symptoms would also be tested for SARS-CoV-2 along with the influenza viruses. In early May, approximately 1500 samples had been analysed within the sentinel system.

Between 27 March and 3 April, the health agency tested approximately 800 randomly selected individuals in Stockholm County, to seek knowledge of the then current infection rate. As it was estimated that Stockholm County by then had the highest infection rate in Sweden, the agency choose to focus on that region. According to the results, 2.5% of the local population were carrying the virus in the upper respiratory tract during the surveyed period. Based on the study and a doubling time of 6–7 days, the agency concluded that 5–10% of the population in the region were carrying the virus on 9 April. This was followed by a similar study on national level. In the study, approximately 4000 people would be tested for an active infection. It was followed by a second national study on 4000 individuals in late April, and a similar national study where "thousands" would be tested for antibodies.

In an April study by researchers at the KTH Royal Institute of Technology and the Science for Life Laboratory, home sample kits were mailed to 1,000 randomly selected individuals in Stockholm to be tested for the presence of antibodies against the SARS-CoV-2 virus which causes the COVID-19 disease. After analysing 440 out of the 550 blood samples returned, the scientists concluded that 10% of the donors were infected during or prior to late March. A follow-up study was carried out later that month with an additional 1,000 tests to determine how much the spread has increased during the weeks between the two studies. The same month, a study was carried out by researchers at the KTH Royal Institute of Technology and Danderyd Hospital where staff at the hospitals were tested for antibodies. After analysing 527 samples, the researchers reported that approximately 20% of the staff had developed antibodies against the virus. After testing the entire staff a total of 19.1% of the staff had developed IgG antibodies at the end of May / early June. The researchers intended to continue testing to carry out several follow-up tests during the following 12 months to learn how long the antibodies will stay in the body. In late April, approximately 11,000 out of the staff at Karolinska University Hospital were tested for the virus in either PCR based or serological tests. The tested individuals included both those with clinical medical and non-clinical medical jobs, as well as staff with non-medical jobs. When 5,500 PCR tests and 3,200 serological tests had been analysed, a total of 15% samples came back positive (7% of PCR tests, 10% of serology tests, with 2% being positive in both tests). Only people without symptoms were tested.

A study based on covid19.healthdata.org projections estimated excess mortality to reported COVID-19 mortality in different countries. Professor Anders Björkman at Karolinska Institute interpreted this as suggesting underreporting discrepancies represents the majority of differences in COVID-19 deaths between the Nordic countries. However, this explanation is not supported by 2020 excess mortality figures. Based on Eurostat, excess mortality in Sweden during 2020 was 7.7%, in Denmark was 1.5% and in Finland 1%, with no excess in Norway.

== Public healthcare system ==
=== Testing ===
Number of analyzed samples per week
Week	Date	Tests	Positive	Positive %
4–8	25 January – 23 February 2020	180	1	0.6%
9	24 February – 1 March 2020	752	13	1.7%
10	2–8 March 2020	4,302	211	4.9%
11	9–15 March 2020	8,990	835	9.3%
12	16–22 March 2020	10,404	911	8.8%
13	23–29 March 2020	12,349	1,943	15.7%
14	30 March – 5 April 2020	17,776	3,211	18.1%
15	6–12 April 2020	19,880	3,711	18.7%
16	13–19 April 2020	20,233	3,741	18.5%
17	20–26 April 2020	24,560	4,181	17.0%
18	27 April – 3 May 2020	28,802	3,906	13.6%
19	4–10 May 2020	29,129	4,215	14.5%
20	11–17 May 2020	33,003	4,004	12.1%
21	18–24 May 2020	28,986	3,713	12.8%
22	25–31 May 2020	36,466	4,300	11.8%
23	1–7 June 2020	49,162	6,060	12.3%
24	8–14 June 2020	59,861	7,229	12.1%
25	15–21 June 2020	61,803	7,462	12.1%
26	22–28 June 2020	75,171	7,645	10.2%
27	29 June – 5 July 2020	77,642	4,935	6.4%
28	6–13 July 2020	81,801	2,789	3.4%
29	14–19 July 2020	69,393	2,274	3.2%
30	20–26 July 2020	59,143	1,376	2.3%
31	27 July – 2 August 2020	52,959	1,598	3.0%
32	3–9 August 2020	53,721	2,016	3.8%
33	10–16 August 2020	56,487	2,058	3.6%
34	17–23 August 2020	65,546	1,687	2.6%
35	24–30 August 2020	85,060	1,361	1.6%
36	31 August – 6 September 2020	126,219	1,515	1.2%
37	7–13 September 2020	142,673	1,598	1.1%
38	14–20 September 2020	139,471	2,084	1.5%
39	21–27 September 2020	128,852	2,926	2.3%
40	28 September – 4 October 2020	127,844	3,641	2.8%
41	5–11 October 2020	136,883	4,282	3.1%
42	12–18 October 2020	148,267	5,624	3.8%
43	19 – 25 October 2020	164,742	9,165	5.6%
44	26 October – 1 November 2020	189,301	18,489	9.8%
45	2–8 November 2020	228,023	25,483	11.2%
46	9–15 November 2020	260,673	31,405	12.0%
47	16–22 November 2020	260,710	31,975	12.3%
48	23–29 November 2020	275,712	35,552	13.3%
49	30 November – 6 December 2020	261,229	36,842	14.1%
50	7–13 December 2020	270,944	43,653	16.1%
51	14–20 December 2020	287,428	46,210	16.1%
52	21–27 December 2020	232,114	37,168	16.0%
53	28 December 2020 – 3 January 2021	201,011	41,347	20.6%
1	4–10 January 2021	207,432	39,471	19.0%
2	11–17 January 2021	200,844	28,965	14.4%
3	18–24 January 2021	193,188	23,273	12.0%
4	25–31 January 2021	193,400	20,618	10.7%
5	1–7 February 2021	197,551	19,635	9.9%
6	8–14 February 2021	209,362	21,313	10.2%
7	15–21 February 2021	222,512	23,627	10.6%
8	22–28 February 2021	238,618	26,726	11.2%
9	1–7 March 2021	249,015	27,782	11.2%
10	8–14 March 2021	270,763	28,589	10.5%
11	15–21 March 2021	303,385	33,070	10.9%
12	22–28 March 2021	329,080	37,918	11.5%
13	29 March – 4 April 2021	316,261	38,431	12.2%
14	5–11 April 2021	304,741	41,175	13.5%
15	12–18 April 2021	330,502	41,068	12.4%
16	19–25 April 2021	316,107	36,086	11.4%
17	26 April – 2 May 2021	336,138	35,321	10.5%
18	3–9 May 2021	347,224	33,933	9.8%
19	10–16 May 2021	292,512	27,245	9.3%
20	17–23 May 2021	265,660	19,860	7.5%
21	24–30 May 2021	232,516	9,206	4.0%
22	31 May – 6 June 2021	192,284	11,025	5.7%
23	7–13 June 2021	158,367	5,083	3.2%
24	14–20 June 2021	152,866	4,356	2.8%
25	21–27 June 2021	107,524	2,694	2.5%
26	28 June – 4 July 2021	106,591	2,699	2.5%
27	5–11 July 2021	81,199	2,268	2.8%
28	12-18 July	72,956	2,506	3.4%
29	19–25 July 2021	75,692	3,289	4.4%
30	26 July – 1 August 2021	78,072	4,045	5.2%
31	2–8 August 2021	91,445	5,301	5.8%
32	9–15 August 2021	104,710	6,687	6.4%
33	16–22 August 2021	123,749	6,199	5.0%
34	23–29 August 2021	187,735	5,301	4.4%
35	30 August – 5 September 2021	237,851	5,301	3.4%
36	6–12 September 2021	262,453	8,403	3.2%
37	13–19 September 2021	186,375	5,536	3.0%
38	20–26 September 2021	161,887	4,526	2.8%
39	27 September – 3 October 2021	143,230	4,734	3.3%
40	4–10 October 2021	139,988	4,467	3.2%
41	11–17 October 2021	143,932	4,423	3.1%
42	18–24 October 2021	126,773	4,588	3.6%
43	25–31 October 2021	125,784	5,963	4.7%
44	1–7 November 2021	89,743	5,183	5.8%
45	8–14 November 2021	104,368	5,918	5.7%
46	15–21 November 2021	126,815	7,432	5.9%
47	22–28 November 2021	232,716	12,271	5.3%
Total	25 January 2020 – 28 November 2021	13,645,377	1,211,037	8.9%

The first tests were carried out in January 2020, and according to the Swedish Public Health Agency, 'around twenty tests' had already been carried out before the first positive case was confirmed on 30 January 2020. The agency considered that all individuals who developed any symptoms of disease in the respiratory tract after visiting Wuhan should be tested, even those with less severe symptoms. The Public Health Agency expanded testing for COVID-19 on 4 March beyond only those who have been in risk areas abroad, to also test cases of pneumonia without known cause. Initially, all tests were carried out at the agency's high-containment laboratory in Solna. But in mid-February, to increase testing capacity and allow for faster test results, testing also began at the clinical medical laboratories in Göteborg, Halmstad, Lund, Skövde, Stockholm, Umeå and Uppsala. The Public Health agency considered testing and contact tracing to be more important in the early and late pandemic phases, to stop the spread of the disease and find every case, as "it isn't possible to test millions of individuals in the country" during the pandemic phase.

At the end of March 2020, the number of tests carried out each week numbered 10,000. In mid-April, the number of weekly tests had doubled to approximately 20,000. In early April, the government instructed for the testing capacity to be vastly increased to be able to analyse 100.000 samples every week. This was mainly to make it possible to test people with jobs considered crucial to society, for instance policemen and those working in rescue service or with electric power supply, while still having enough capacity to handle all tests needed for the health-care sector. In mid-May, the number of tests carried out were still far from the goal, with approximately 30.000 tests carried out weekly, and according to a representative for Swedish municipalities and regions it would likely be 'weeks' until goals were met. On 4 June, the government announced that due to several regions in Sweden having entered a late phase of the pandemic, coronavirus testing and contact tracing were to be broadened so that everyone with suspected COVID-19 symptoms could be tested free of cost. On 31 May, a total of 275,819 samples had been tested since the start of the Swedish outbreak.

=== Capacity ===
The Stockholm International Fairs, Stockholmsmässan, are being converted into a field hospital with the help of the Swedish Defence Force. The field hospital will be able to house 600 seriously and critically sick patients. The Swedish Defence Forces will provide equipment for 30 of the 600 beds and the Stockholm Regional Council will provide the remaining 570. The facilities were initially used for treating less severe cases, as opposed to those needing intensive care. In late April, it was reported that the Defence Force had provided 50 intensive care beds as part of the two field hospitals. Field hospitals were also erected in Gothenburg, and Helsingborg. The field hospital in Älvsjö were never needed to be taken into use, and were dismantled in early June. The Gothenburg hospital was used for intensive care during a short time span, but was soon taken out of use following massive criticism from health-care workers who voiced concern for patient safety, increased risks of infection and working conditions.

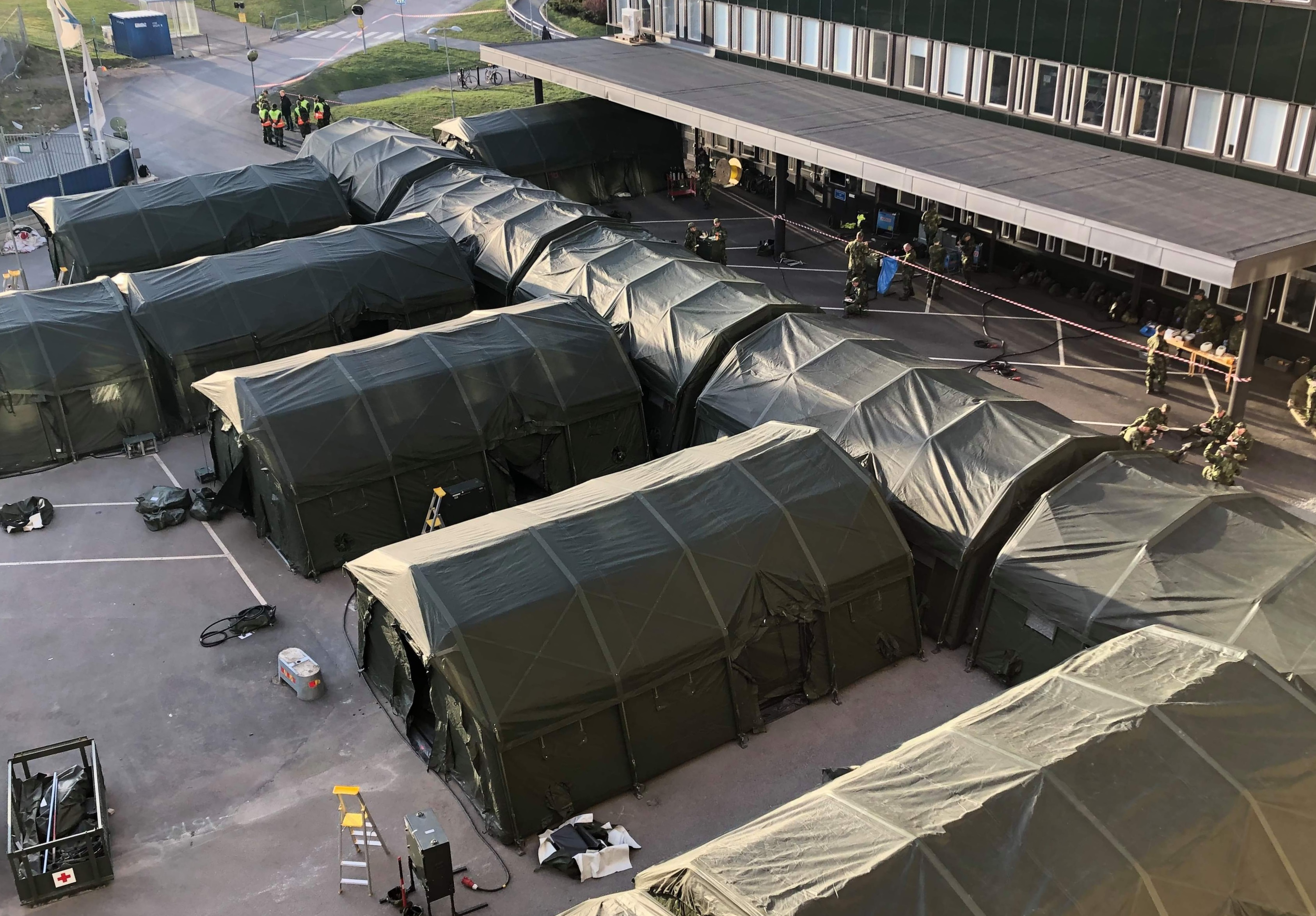
An army-constructed field hospital outside Östra Sjukhuset in Gothenburg on 23 March 2020. The tents contain temporary intensive care units for COVID-19 patients.

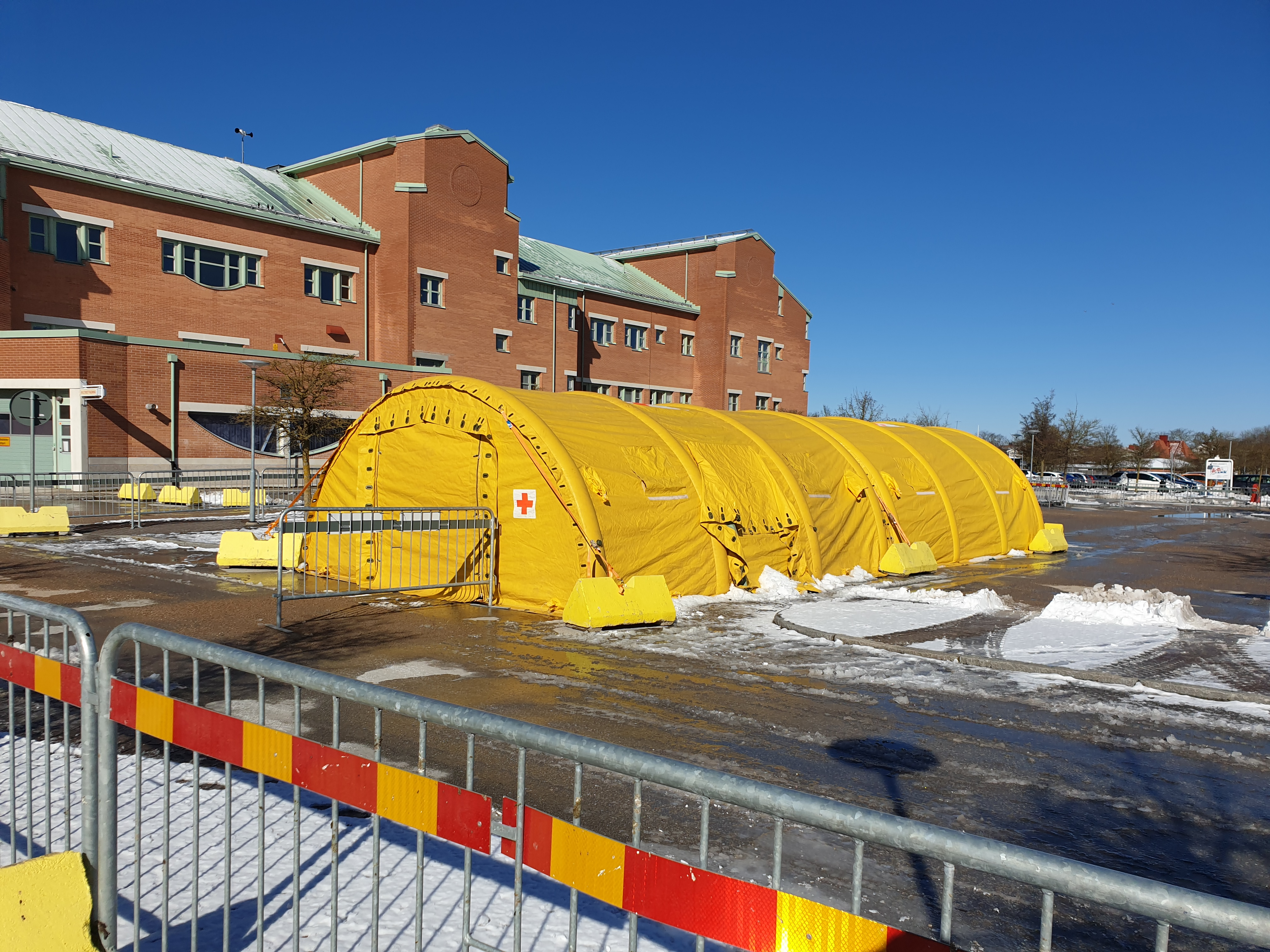
Medical tent set up outside Visby Hospital, 14 March 2020.

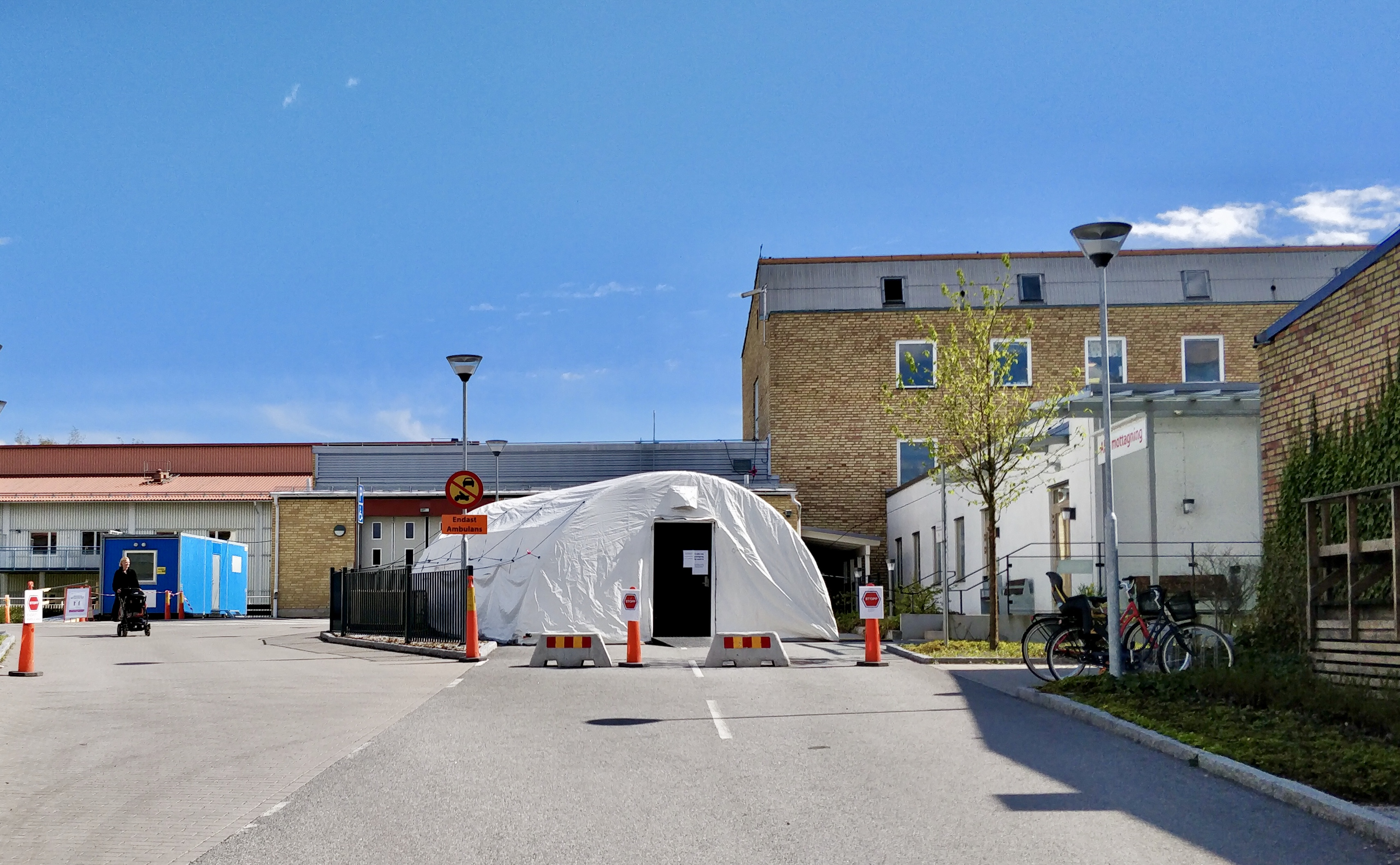
Medical tent set up outside Enköping Hospital

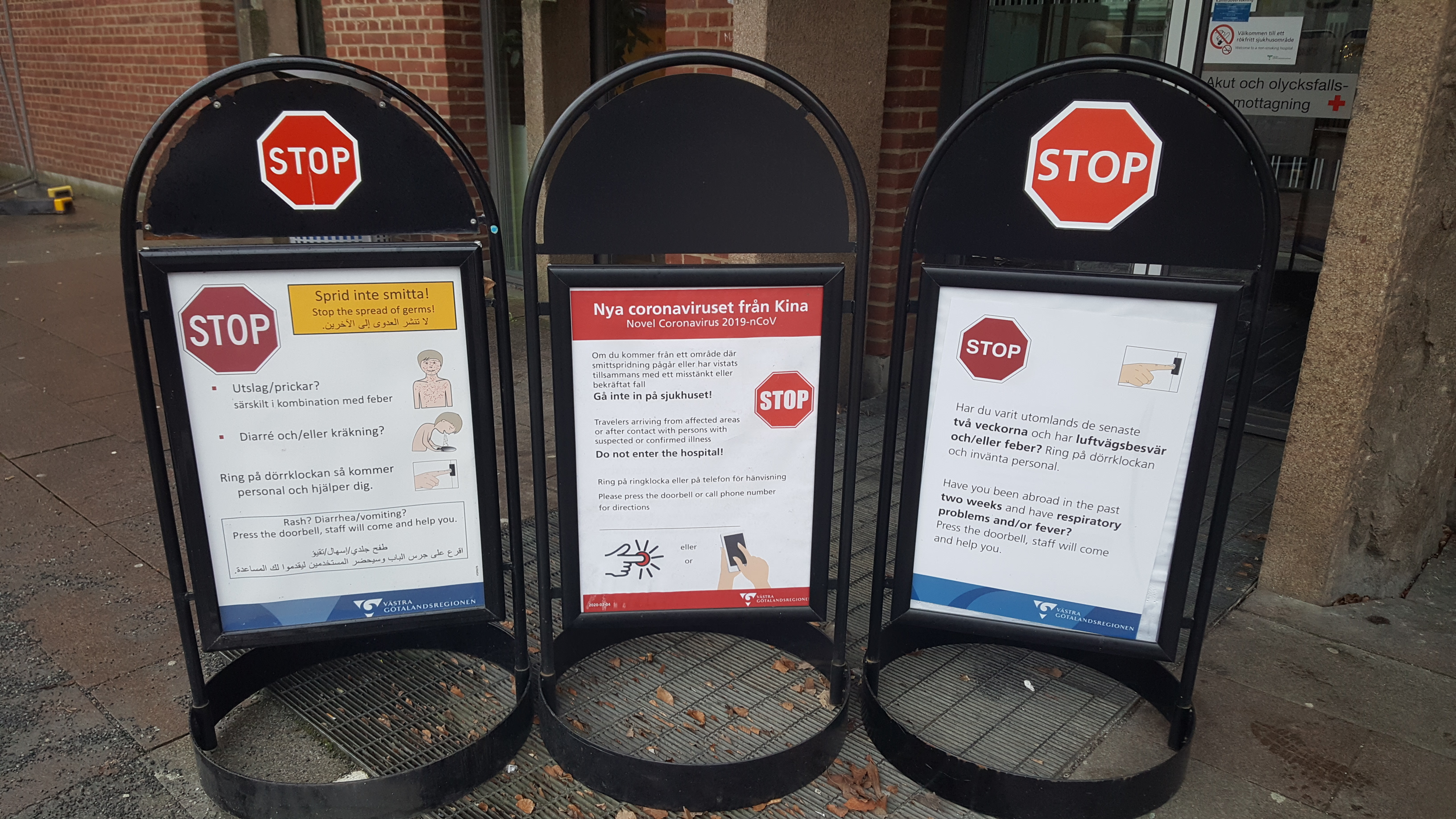
Streetsigns outside Sahlgrenska hospital from late February telling those with potential symptoms of COVID-19 to wait outside the hospital.

The increasing number of cases in March resulted in the cancellation or postponement of close to 50% of planned surgeries, including cancer-related surgeries, in all of Sweden, and up to 90% in large areas such as Stockholm and Uppsala. By May, 44,000 planned surgeries had been postponed in Sweden, increasing the total number of Swedes in line for a surgery to over 150,000. Several regions also chose to cancel many, or all, planned non-acute dentistry as a measure to redistribute healthcare equipment like disposable gloves and masks.

Before the pandemic, the Swedish healthcare system had the capacity to treat approximately 500 persons in Intensive Care Units (ICU). The relatively low number of beds had stayed a source of concern as the crisis evolved, and even though the number had increased to 800 at the beginning of April, healthcare professionals continued to express worry that their hospitals would eventually run out of beds. According to the calculations of the Swedish health agency, up to 1300 ICU beds would be needed when Sweden reached the top of the pandemic. Sweden was eventually able to double the number of intensive care beds in a few weeks, and on 13 April, the National Board of Health and Welfare reported that the total number of ICU beds had risen to 1039, with an occupancy of 80%.

=== Equipment ===
On 13 March, media reported that there was a shortage in personal protective equipment (PPE) for health care staff, and hospitals in Stockholm had been forced to reuse disposable PPEs after sanitation. The regional Health Care Director warned about this scenario in early March and government agencies have temporarily waived the public procurement law to hastily procure more supplies. The National Board of Health and Welfare ('Socialstyrelsen') confirmed that there is no preparedness storage and nothing to distribute to the health care sector. In early April, several counties expressed concern that they might run out of some vital drugs used in intensive care. Later that month, Stockholm County reported of an acute shortage of the anaesthetic propofol.

As one of the main tasks of the Swedish Defence Force is to support the civil community in case of disasters, their resources were used to lessen equipment shortages in the health-care system. The material supplied by the military included crucial medical equipment; X-ray generators, electrocardiographic machines, 154 ventilators and 154 intensive care monitors. The military also supplied personal protective equipment, including 60,000 gas masks and 40,000 protective suits.

=== Staffing ===
On 25 March 2020, Björn Eriksson, the Director of Healthcare in Stockholm, appealed to anyone in the Stockholm Metropolitan Area who had experience in healthcare to volunteer. As of the 26 March 2020, 5100 people with healthcare experience had registered as volunteers.

The increasing number of cases in large areas such as Stockholm and Uppsala has resulted in the cancellation or postponement of up to 90% of planned surgeries, including cancer related surgeries.

When it became clear that the civil society would face difficulties managing the emergent crisis, the Swedish Defence Force were called in to assist the civilian society with manpower, equipment, and logistics. The preparations began in February and the first servicemen were deployed in March. By early April the total military deployed in civilian society numbered 400 servicemen, among them a number of officers to support the National Board of Health and Welfare with crisis management and laboratory technicians to support the Public Health Agency of Sweden. Tasks for the military personnel also including collecting and transporting samples. A number of military ambulances were also taken in use within the civilian health system.

== Social impact ==
=== Finance and the economy ===
The Swedish economy decreased by -2.9% in 2020 and grew by 4.8% in 2021. Unemployment peaked at 9.2% in June 2020, and was down to 8.2% at the end of 2021, the lowest since the June 2020 peak but higher than the pre-pandemic level of 7.1% in January 2020.

The economy was also affected by problems with global supply lines, which had forced some of the biggest manufacturing companies in Sweden, including Scania and Volvo Cars, to halt their production in March 2020, as well as a decrease in consumption.

The Ministry of Health and Social Affairs calculated a 1.5% drop in pensions for 2021 (as Swedish pensions are attached to GDP and income). however the actual outcome was a small increase of 0.5%.

In mid-March 2020, the government proposed a €27 billion emergency package to reduce the economic impact of the crisis. The proposal included a system with a reduction in work hours where the government will pay half to salary, aiming to help businesses stay afloat without having to do layoffs. Further, the government would pay the employer's expenses for any sick leaves, which is normally shared between the employer and the state. The normal costs of employer contributions have also been temporarily discontinued for small business owners. This will save small businesses approximately €490 per employee each month but will result in a loss of tax revenue of €3.2 billion. The budget emergency package proposed by the government in mid-March to lessen the economic impact of the crisis was supported across the political spectrum, including all parties in opposition in the Riksdag. It was also welcomed by trade unions as well as the private and business sectors. Jan-Olof Jacke, the CEO of the biggest employer's organisation, the Confederation of Swedish Enterprise, and transportation CEO Marcus Dahlsten stressed that "it won't be enough", however.

On 2 April 2020, the Financial Supervisory Authority (Finansinspektionen) decided that Swedish banks temporarily can allow exemptions for housing mortgage lenders regarding amortising of loans.

=== Transportation ===
==== Aviation ====
Air transportation in Sweden is primarily run by public and private companies – principally Scandinavian Airlines System (SAS) and Norwegian Air Shuttle (NAS) – and has been severely impacted by the pandemic and greatly reduced. Like airlines around the world, Sweden's carriers have reduced the frequency of their flights, reduced their work force and asked the local government for financial assistance. On 15 March 2020, SAS announced that they would temporarily reduce their workforce by 10,000 people, which constitutes about 90% of their workforce. Soon almost all domestic flights were cancelled. Swedish authorities advised against all non-essential travel inside and out of Sweden. SAS Group decided to fly only four domestic departures and four domestic arrivals from Arlanda from 6 April 2020, plus some international flights, while Norwegian cancelled all domestic flights in Sweden. The pandemic also caused the temporary closure of some smaller airports, while other airports with previous financial issues were closed permanently due to the collapse in traffic.

This led to a sharp decrease in both domestic and international passenger traffic. In 2021, traffic increased again but it was still below the 2019 figures.

==== Railroad ====
Rail transport in Sweden, which is principally run by the public operator SJ AB, has continued to operate throughout the pandemic, albeit with a slightly reduced schedule so that additional carriages can be added to trains, which in conjunction with fewer tickets being made available for sale, aims to ensure social distancing of those passengers that continue to travel. The decrease in travel had a big impact on the public transport sector due to a loss of revenue in ticket sales, which led to trade association Swedish Public Transport Association (Svensk kollektivtrafik) asking the government for financial aid.

=== Politics ===
In mid-March, the parliamentary leaders from the parties in the Riksdag agreed on using pairing for the upcoming weeks, to make it possible to decrease the number of members of parliament present during voting sessions, from the usual 349 to 55. This decision was taken both as a measure to lower the risk of spread of the infection (social distancing), and to make sure the daily work in the parliament could proceed even if a big number of MPs would become sick. Similar decisions were taken in many of Swedish municipal councils. Several regional assemblies also decreased the number of politicians present each session, including Västerbotten County who did it as a measure to decrease long-distance travelling, and Scania County.

On 25 March, The Swedish Social Democratic Party together with the Swedish Trade Union Confederation decided to cancel their traditional May Day demonstrations. They will instead hold an event on a digital platform, which will include speeches by the Swedish prime minister and leader of the Social Democrats, Stefan Löfven, as well as union confederation leader Karl-Petter Thorwaldsson. The Left Party also cancelled their nationwide demonstrations, and announced that there would instead be a digital celebration, including a speech by party leader Jonas Sjöstedt. The Almedalen Week, considered to be the biggest and most important forum in Sweden for seminars, debates and political speeches on current social issues, held in Visby every summer, was cancelled as a result of the ban on large gatherings. The decision was taken on 1 April by the organiser after consultation with the major political parties. Prime Minister Stefan Löfvén had already announced that he had cancelled his planned participation in the upcoming event. A similar event in Stockholm, 'Järvaveckan', was also cancelled, and will not be held until 2021. The annual LGBT festival West Pride in Gothenburg was also cancelled as a result of the pandemic. Instead, the organisers proclaimed 25 May to 7 June a 'flag period', encouraging organisations and individuals to hoist the rainbow flag.

=== Royal family ===
Following the recommendation from the Swedish authorities that those over the age of 70 should self-isolate, the Swedish King and Queen, Carl XVI Gustaf and Queen Silvia, aged 74 and 76, both chose to leave the palace to work from distance in the estate Stenhammar in Sörmland.

On 5 April 2020, at the first day of the Holy Week, King Carl XVI Gustaf addressed the nation in a televised speech. In his speech, he stressed that all Swedes had an obligation to the country to "act responsibly and selflessly". He also stressed that many who otherwise would travel, spend time with friends and family or go to church would need to make sacrifices during the upcoming Easter holiday. In his speech, he specifically addressed those working or volunteering in the health-care sector, saying "This is a huge task. It requires courage. And it will require endurance. To all of you involved in this vital work, I offer my heartfelt thanks", as well as other people doing vital work in society, to ensure Swedes "can buy food, that public transport continues to operate, and everything else we so easily take for granted – my warmest thanks to you all". He finished saying that all would embrace the message "The journey is long and arduous. But in the end, light triumphs over darkness, and we will be able to feel hope again", ending his speech wishing everyone a happy Easter.

On 17 December 2020, King Carl Gustaf admitted he felt that Sweden's COVID-19 strategy "[has] failed. We have a large number who have died and that is terrible".

=== Education ===
On 13 March 2020, the spring Swedish Scholastic Aptitude Test (′Högskoleprovet′) was cancelled affecting approximately 70,000 prospective students who had registered themselves. This was the first time the Swedish Scholastic Aptitude Test has been cancelled since it was established in 1977. On 23 March 2020 the Swedish National Agency for Education ('Skolverket'), cancelled the national tests to give teachers in Sweden more time to prepare for the possibility of distance education.

=== Defence ===
The Swedish Armed Forces cancelled the international military exercise Aurora 20 which was scheduled to be held between May and June. Austria and Canada had previously announced their cancellation of their planned participation.

=== Arts and entertainment ===
The ban of public gatherings with more than 500 people, later revised down to 50, led to concerts and other events being cancelled or postponed. Concerts cancelled due to the ban on large crowds included four sold-out concerts with Håkan Hellström at the Nya Ullevi Arena, Gothenburg, scheduled for June and August. As the total number of tickets sold to the concerts numbered 300,000, it was believed to be a significant blow to Gothenburg's tourism industry, with a potential loss of €84 million if all concerts scheduled at the arena were to be cancelled. The organiser of the music festival Summerburst had previously announced cancelling their scheduled event at Nya Ullevi. The rock festival Sweden Rock, held every year since 1992 in Blekinge and scheduled for June, was cancelled due to the ongoing pandemic. Theatre and opera were affected, with major venues such as Gothenburg opera house, Malmö Opera, Royal Dramatic Theatre and Royal Swedish Opera all closing their venues and cancel upcoming events. Cinema were affected as well, and Sweden's largest cinema chain, Filmstaden, decided to close all their cinemas on 17 March until further notice. In April, the Swedish amusement parks Gröna Lund in Stockholm and Liseberg in Gothenburg announced that they were to cancel or reschedule all concerts scheduled before midsummer. The former had already postponed the season opening indefinitely, while the latter were still hoping to open the park as planned in mid-May. As the amusement parks mostly rely on seasonal workers, closures would result in thousands of cancelled employment contracts.

Starting 30 March 2020 the public library in Gävle will start with a book delivery service for people aged 70 or older. The library will also start a take-away service where you can pre-loan books and pick them in a take-away bag.

==== Television ====
On 6 March, the Swedish national broadcaster SVT held a crisis meeting to consider broadcasting the live finals of Melodifestivalen 2020 on 7 March without an audience, as a response to the growing outbreak. The Danish equivalent had recently decided to broadcast their version of the finals without an audience. Ultimately, SVT decided to allow the audience to enter the arena, although they advised people who felt sick to stay at home.

The popular TV show Antikrundan, also broadcast by SVT, where a number of antiques appraisers visits different locations in Sweden to appraise antiques brought there by local people, cancelled their planned tour for the recording of the 2020 winter season. According to the producers, they were instead working on an 'alternative' show. The sing-along show Lotta på Liseberg, which is televised live by TV4 from the amusement park Liseberg in Gothenburg, announced that the 2020 season would not be cancelled, but would be recorded without an audience due to the ban of gatherings. SVT had previously announced similar plans for their live sing-along show Allsång på Skansen, which is broadcast live from the amusement park Skansen in Stockholm.

=== Sports ===
In athletics, all 2020 Diamond League events scheduled to be held in May were postponed, which included the meet in Stockholm. The world's largest half marathon in Gothenburg, Göteborgsvarvet, was postponed until later in 2020 and then cancelled completely on 27 March. The annual recreational bicycle race Vätternrundan, scheduled to be held in June, was also cancelled as a result of the pandemic. The organisers made the decision public on 2 April. The professional bicycle race Postnord UCI WWT Vårgårda West Sweden, part of the UCI Women's World Tour and scheduled for August, was also cancelled.

On 19 March, the governing body for association football in Sweden formally announced that the premiere of the 2020 season for the first and second division leagues, men's Allsvenskan and Superettan as well as women's Damallsvenskan and Elitettan, will be postponed to late May or early June. The decision will not affect the leagues below the second level. Two days later it was announced that the 2020 edition of the association football award ceremony Fotbollsgalan was cancelled. Many of the professional teams in the highest division warned that the loss of income following the postponement of the season would have a severe impact on their economy. After consultations with the Public Health Agency, the organisation behind youth football tournament Gothia Cup, in Gothenburg, decided to cancel the 2020 event. According to the organisers, the tournament will return in 2021. The youth handball tournament Partille Cup was also cancelled. Professional handball was affected as well, with the last rounds and the finals in the highest men's and women's leagues, Handbollsligan and Svensk handbollselit, being cancelled. Similarly, the Swedish Basketball Federation choose to stop all games until May, effectively stopping the highest divisions SBL and SBL Dam mid-season. In Speedway, the start of Elitserien, the highest league in the Swedish league system, was rescheduled to 2 June. To manage a tighter schedule, the sport's governing body Swedish Motorcycle and Snowmobile Federation also decided to cancel the quarterfinals.

Swedish Minister for Sports Amanda Lind announced on 29 May that some recommendations were to be lifted starting from 14 June, when sports events would be allowed under the condition that they're practised outdoors. And as the ban on crowds and the recommendations against travel were still in place, all games had to be played on virtually empty arenas and athletes would not be allowed to travel longer than two miles to participate in sports events. However, professional athletes would be exempt from the recommendations, and allowed to travel nationwide if needed for competitive events.

Rally Sweden, which was scheduled for 11–14 February 2021, was cancelled on 15 December due to rising virus cases in its country.

=== Notable Swedes who have died of Covid-19 ===
Radio presenter Kerstin Behrendtz died on 28 March 2020 from COVID-19. She had been diagnosed with the disease on 23 March 2020, and had been ill since about a week before that with cold symptoms. She spent a week in intensive care receiving respiratory care. She was 69 years old when she died.

Television and radio host Adam Alsing died on 15 April 2020 from COVID-19 after having had the disease for several weeks. He was 51, and his death raised awareness in Sweden of the dangers of the disease, since he was comparatively young and had no known risk factors.

Sven Wollter was a Swedish actor, writer, and political activist. Wollter died on 10 November 2020, in Luleå, Sweden, from complications caused by COVID-19 which he had been infected by during a visit to Stockholm.

The Finnish-Swedish textile artist Riitta Vainionpää died on 24 April 2021 in Stockholm, Sweden from COVID-19. Vainionpää was hospitalized for 42 days before dying.

== Statistics ==
=== Cases ===
As of 26 April 2020, 18,670 people had tested positive for COVID-19 in Sweden. As of mid-April 2020, Södermanland County was the region most affected by the pandemic (in cases per capita), followed by Stockholm County and Östergötland County.

==== Total cases ====
source: Public Health Agency of Sweden
Total confirmed cases
View chart definition.
Note: Data on new cases is compiled by the Public Health Agency of Sweden at 11:30 CEST (UTC+02:00) each day (but from 18 June 2020 not on weekends). Reports of new cases to the Public Health Agency might be delayed by up to several days, especially around weekends, possibly introducing delays in reported number of cases for the last few days. The jump in cases in early June is due to increased primary care testing in several counties.

==== Cases per day ====
source: Public Health Agency of Sweden
Cases per day
View chart definition.
Note: Data on new cases is compiled by the Public Health Agency of Sweden at 11:30 CEST (UTC+02:00) each day. Reports of new cases to the Public Health Agency might be delayed by up to several days, especially around weekends, possibly introducing delays in reported number of cases for the last few days. The jump in cases in early June is due to increased primary care testing in several counties.

=== Intensive care ===
Swedish hospitals saw a sharp rise in the number of COVID-19 patients receiving intensive care during March 2020. The number of new patients somewhat stabilised during the first two weeks of April, with between 30 and 45 patients per day, averaging 39. The number of new patients admitted to ICU decreased slightly during the third week of April, averaging 35. The mean age of the patients who underwent intensive care was 59 years old, three out of four (74%) were men, and the average time between diagnosis and admission to an intensive care unit was 10 days. The majority (68%) of those who received intensive care had one or more underlying condition considered one of the risk groups, with the most prevalent being hypertension (37%), diabetes (25%), chronic pulmonary heart disease (24%), chronic respiratory disease (14%) and chronic cardiovascular disease (11%). The share of patients not belonging to a risk group was significantly higher among younger patients. Among those younger than 60 years, 39% did not have any of those underlying conditions. As of 26 April, 1,315 with a confirmed COVID-19 infection had received intensive care in Sweden.

==== Total hospitalisations ====
source: Public Health Agency of Sweden
Total intensive care hospitalisations
View chart definition.
Note: Data on new intensive care hospitalisations is compiled by the Public Health Agency of Sweden at 11:30 CEST (UTC+02:00) each day, and is based on reports to the Swedish Intensive Care Registry (SIR). Data includes all intensive care cases with a COVID-19 diagnosis (U07.1), but excludes non-confirmed cases (U07.2).

==== Hospitalisations per day ====
source: Public Health Agency of Sweden
intensive care hospitalisations per day
View chart definition.
Note: Data on new intensive care hospitalisations is compiled by the Public Health Agency of Sweden at 11:30 CEST (UTC+02:00) each day, and is based on reports to the Swedish Intensive Care Registry (SIR). Data includes all intensive care cases with a COVID-19 diagnosis (U07.1), but excludes non-confirmed cases (U07.2).

=== Deaths ===
A large majority (93%) of the deaths in April 2020 belonged to at least one risk group, with chronic cardiovascular disease being the most prevalent (53%), followed by diabetes (26%), chronic respiratory disease (18%) and chronic renal failure (16%). As of 31 March 2022, the mean age among those who had died with confirmed COVID-19 disease was 82, and the majority (55%) of those who had died with the disease were men.

An analysis published in newspaper SvD in April 2022, where Sweden was divided into 5984 similarly populated areas, shows that 9 of the 13 highest death rates were found in wealthy areas around central Stockholm, with south-eastern Kungsholmen (the area around Stockholm City Hall) topping the list with a death rate ten times the national average, 15,6/1000 residents. Also "vulnerable areas" with low socioeconomic status had higher than average death rates. Areas with high death rates appeared to have a large proportion of residents aged over 65 and/or foreign born. Finnish immigrants stood out among the foreign born with a death rate five times that of native born residents, followed by Turkish and Somali born residents.

==== Deaths per day ====
source: Public Health Agency of Sweden
Deaths with confirmed COVID-19 per day
View chart definition.
Note: Data on new deaths is compiled by the Public Health Agency of Sweden at 11:30 CEST (UTC+02:00) each day from the communicable disease surveillance system SmiNet. Reports of new deaths to the Public Health Agency might be delayed by up to several days, especially around weekends, possibly introducing delays in reported number of cases for the last few days. In mid-April, approximately 30% of the cases were reported within 24 hours, 50% within 48 hours, and 90% within one week. Data from the Health Agency includes all deaths where a COVID-19 diagnosis (U07.1) had been confirmed during the past 30 days, including cases where the cause of death was not attributed to COVID-19 (as of data from the National Board of Health and Welfare from 21 April, this number amounted to 4.5% of cases confirmed in a laboratory), but excludes non-confirmed cases (U07.2).

==== Nursing homes ====
Out of the people who died of the disease in Sweden, many were residents in nursing homes. In early May, more than 500 nursing homes had reported cases of COVID-19. Among people aged 70 or older, half (50%) of those who died had been living at a nursing home, while another 26% had received home care. A 30% excess mortality was observed at Swedish nursing homes during the pandemic. The figure differed between regions, with the figures being highest in Stockholm County where the excess mortality at nursing homes reached approximately 100%, according to research by SVT.

source: Socialstyrelsen
COVID-19 deaths of 70+ years old inhabitants by place of death and county (6-Dec-2021)
View source data.

According to Socialstyrelsen 108,523 individuals were living in Swedish care homes during 2019, and 244,174 individuals received home care. According to Eurostat in 2018 Sweden had 140,979 long-term care beds in nursing and residential care facilities, and on 1 January 2020 Sweden had 2,065,367 inhabitants in age group 65 years or over.

==== Age and sex ====
source: National Board of Health and Welfare
COVID-19 deaths by sex and age (22-Nov-2021)
View source data.
View source data.
Note: Data is compiled by the National Board of Health and Welfare and is based on death certificates. Data includes both confirmed cases (U07.1) and non-confirmed cases (U07.2)

According to Eurostat median age of Swedish population is 40.5 years and life expectancy at birth is 80.9 years.

==== Excess mortality ====
During the pandemic, excess mortality was observed in Sweden from late March and until June 2020, peaking at 38.2% in April 2020. From July and until November that year, excess mortality was negative in Sweden. It was 10.7% in November 2020, 24.5% in December and 18.6% in January 2021. From February 2021, excess mortality was either negative or below 4.5% for the remainder of the year. (Note: Excess mortality according to a published statistical analysis by the Public Health Agency based on data from the Swedish Tax Agency and the European mortality monitoring activity (EuroMOMO))

As of 31 May 2020, there had been approximately 4,800 excess deaths in Sweden. The number of deaths with a laboratory-confirmed COVID-19 diagnosis accounted for 75% of excess mortality until May 2020. According to SCB preliminary statistics in week 15, the number of deaths registered was 2,569 (on average 367 per day). This is 205 deaths more than the second highest number of deaths in a week, which was 2,364 deaths in the first week of 2000. A total of 10,554 people died in April 2020, which almost reaches the level of December 1993 – then 11,057 people died. In total, 97,008 people died in 1993 which was the highest number of deaths in one year since 1918 during the peak of the Spanish flu. A March 2022 estimate published in the Lancet found that during the pandemic, Sweden placed 176th of 194 included nations, among those nations with the lowest excess mortality.

source: Statistics Sweden smoothed by applying 7-day moving average
All-cause daily deaths spring semesters 2015–2021
View source data.
source: Statistics Sweden
All-cause deaths per standardized month per 100 000 inhabitants 2015–2021
View source data.

Similar weekly information available at Socialstyrelsen. and Eurostat

=== Case fatality rate ===
The trend of case fatality rate for COVID-19 from 4 February 2020, the day first case in the country was recorded.

Case fatality rate
View chart definition.

Note that Sweden experienced shortage of tests at the early stages of pandemic, and that mortality ratios has strong age gradient.

== Timeline of responses ==
=== Economic policy ===
Local governments, such as the municipal government in Gävle, have applied measures to businesses delaying the payment of invoices until 1 September 2020 at the earliest and deferring rent payments.

== See also ==
- COVID-19 pandemic
- COVID-19 pandemic by country and territory
- COVID-19 pandemic in Europe
- COVID-19 pandemic in the European Union
- Healthcare in Sweden
- Operation Gloria
