= Mistra Council for Evidence-Based Environmental Management =

The Mistra Council for Evidence-Based Environmental Management (Mistra EviEM) is an independent council that conducts systematic reviews and maps on various environmental issues to improve the basis for decisions in Swedish environmental policy. By synthesising and analysing all available evidence on a certain topic, Mistra EviEM is contributing to environmental management placed on a scientific foundation. In Sweden, systematic reviews of this kind have previously been conducted primarily in the medicine and health care sector, for instance by the Swedish Agency for Health Technology Assessment and Assessment of Social Services (SBU).

Mistra EviEM, who began its operations in January 2012, is financed by the Swedish Foundation for Strategic Environmental Research (Mistra). The council is located at the Stockholm Environment Institute. Mistra EviEM is the Swedish centre in the Collaboration for Environmental Evidence (CEE), which is an open community for actors working towards a sustainable global environment and the conservation of biodiversity.
