= Olivia Wigzell =

Swedish politician

Director-general of the Swedish National Board of Health and Welfare
- Incumbent
- Assumed office 2015

Director-general of the Swedish Agency for Health Technology Assessment and Assessment of Social Services
- In office 2014–2015

Municipal commissioner and Vice Mayor of Stockholm Municipality
- In office 1998–2000

Stockholm County Councilor
- In office 1994–1998

Personal details
- Born: 11 January 1964 (age 62)
- Party: Social Democrats
- Spouse: Niclas Jacobson

Selma Olivia Jacobson Wigzell (born 11 January 1964) is a Swedish official and former politician. Since 2015, she has been director-general of the Swedish National Board of Health and Welfare. During her leadership, a scandal arose regarding political intrigues and lack of medical competency in the agency.

She served as County Council Councilor of Stockholm County between 1994 and 1998, and Municipal Commissioner and Vice mayor of Stockholm Municipality between 1998 and 2000. During both tenures she represented the Swedish Social Democratic Party, but today she is not affiliated with any political party.

After leaving politics Olivia has worked at the Swedish Association of Health Professionals and as secretary in Ansvarskommittén. In April 2007, Olivia was employed by the National Board of Health and Welfare, which she left in 2008, for the job as head of the Division for Public Health and Health Care, at the Ministry of Health and Social Affairs.

In 2014, she took the office as director-general of the Swedish Agency for Health Technology Assessment and Assessment of Social Services. She maintained the office until the following year when she was appointed director-general of the Swedish National Board of Health and Welfare. In 2018, she was named the 4th most influential person in Swedish health policy. Between 2015 and 2018, she served as Sweden's representative in the executive board of the World Health Organization. She is chairman of the OECD Health Committee and the board of Örebro University.
