= COVID-19 vaccination in Sweden =

Plan to immunize against COVID-19

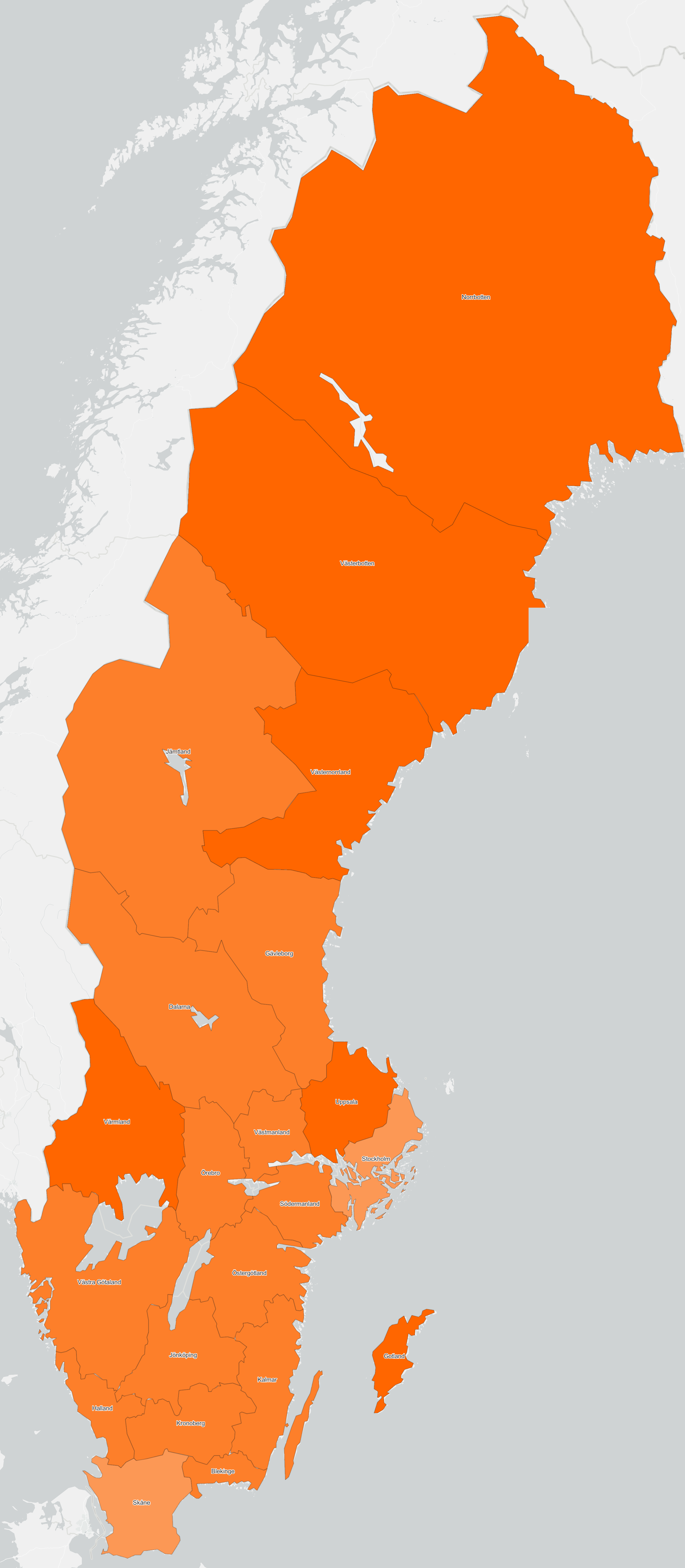
- Map of Sweden showing vaccine uptake, the percent of residents aged 12+ who have had at least one dose, per county as of 20 April 2022. > 90% 85–90% 80–85% 75–80% < 75%
- Native name: Vaccination mot covid-19
- Date: 27 December 2020 – present
- Location: Sweden
- Cause: COVID-19 pandemic in Sweden
- Organised by: Public Health Agency of Sweden (FoHM), regional councils of Sweden
- Participants: As of 17 December 2021: 17,049,272 total doses
- Outcome: 85.3% of the population of Sweden (12 years and older) has received at least one vaccine dose 81.1% of the adult population of Sweden has received at least two doses
- Website: FoHM's page on COVID-19 vaccination

Vaccination against COVID-19 in Sweden started on the of 27 December 2020 after the approval of the Pfizer–BioNTech vaccine by the European Commission. In Sweden, the Public Health Agency has been commissioned by the government to create a vaccination plan. Sveriges riksbank, the central bank of Sweden, predicts that efficient vaccination against COVID-19 has macroeconomic benefits. As of 20 April 2022, 87.1% of people (12 years and older) in Sweden have received at least one dose, with a total of 21,491,717 doses administered.: At least one vaccine has been approved for all age groups 12 and older. Children younger than 12 in high risk groups can also be vaccinated.

== Plan ==
Sweden is part of the European Union cooperation for the purchase of COVID-19 vaccines. According to this agreement, Sweden will have access to 6 million vaccine doses. According to the Prime Minister Stefan Löfven, Sweden expected to get sufficient number of COVID-19 vaccines to immunise around one-fifth of the population by April 2021. The initial goal was for all adults in Sweden to have been offered at least one vaccine dose before 1 July 2021; this goal was later moved to 15 August 2021, and then moved again to 5 September 2021. The goal was postposed yet again to 19 September due to a lower amount of expected vaccine deliveries. In August 2021, the Public Health Agency of Sweden made the assessment that a majority of the population would be offered a third vaccine dose by 2022, due to the emergence of new variants of SARS-CoV-2.

=== Order of priority ===
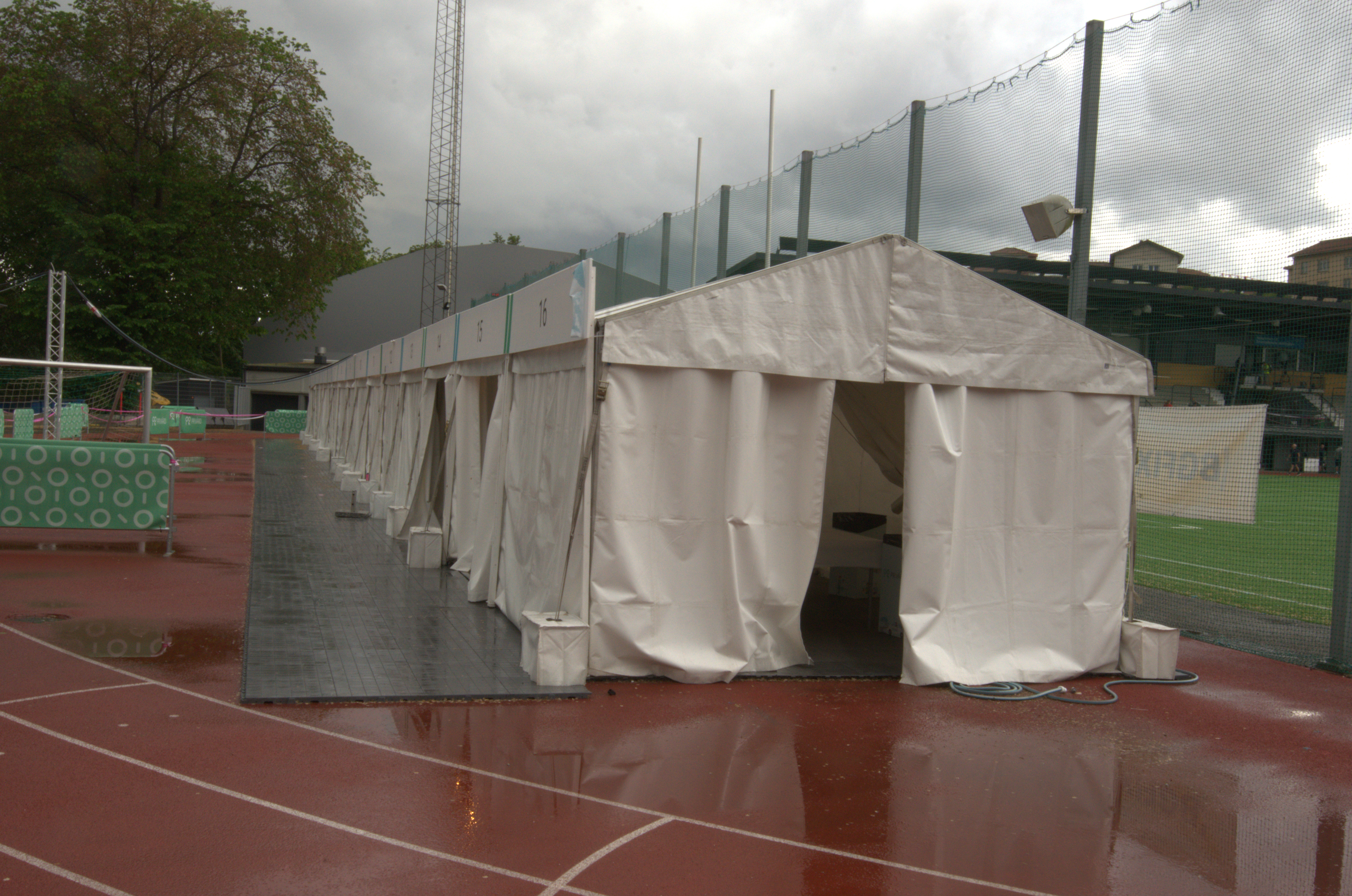
Tents for vaccination at a stadium in Stockholm in June 2021.

The principle followed in deciding the order of priority is that those with the greatest need for protection receive the vaccine first. Elderly individuals living in care homes, healthcare workers working with risk groups and adults living with someone in the risk group will be offered vaccination during the first phase. Other individuals aged 70 or older, adults who live with functional impairments as well as medical care professionals will be vaccinated in the second phase. In the third phase, other adults in the risk group will be vaccinated. Everyone else will be offered a vaccine in the fourth phase of vaccine distribution. As of February 2021, the Public Health Agency had not recommended COVID-19 vaccination to children under 18 unless the child belonged to a high-risk group. The recommendation was changed by the Public Health Agency in June 2021 to offer everyone 16 years and older COVID-19 vaccination, and in October 2021, approved the Pfizer, but not Moderna, vaccine for those 12 and older. In January 2022, Sweden decided against recommending COVID vaccines for ages 5–11, arguing that the benefits did not outweigh the risks. Children in high risk groups can, however, be vaccinated.

=== Safety ===
Even when approved, the vaccine is continuously monitored for new side effects. The scientific documentation of the approved vaccine is presented as a publicly accessible European Public Assessment Report.

=== Vaccines on order ===
Vaccine	Doses ordered	Approval	Deployment	Status
Pfizer–BioNTech	20 million	21 December 2020	27 December 2020	In use
Moderna	3.6 million	6 January 2021	January 2021	In use
Oxford–AstraZeneca	6 million	29 January 2021	February 2021	Discontinued
Janssen	4.5 million	11 March 2021	Pending	On hold
Novavax	2.2 million	20 December 2021	Pending	Pending
CureVac	4.5 million	Aborted	Aborted	Aborted
Sanofi–GSK	4.9 million	Pending	Pending	Pending

== Challenges ==
Vaccine hesitancy is one of the major challenges to the COVID-19 vaccination program in Sweden, with 26% of Swedes saying that they do not want to be vaccinated in a poll. 46% of the poll participants said that they want the vaccine. The chief epidemiologist of Sweden, Anders Tegnell, expects that more people will accept vaccination with time. Another poll conducted in April–May 2021, however, shows that around nine of ten Swedes are willing to get vaccinated, with foreign-born Swedes being less inclined.

== Roll-out ==
In late January 2021, around 1,000 people, all healthcare workers, were given doses of the Moderna vaccine that had been stored at the incorrect temperature.

In mid-April 2021, it was announced that Sweden was working with several other EU countries to hold negotiations with Russia over purchasing the Sputnik vaccine once the EMA had approved it.

On 5 May 2021, the Stockholm region began its phase 4, opening up vaccination slots to people aged 55 to 59. On 14 June 2021, over half of Swedish adults had received at least one vaccine dose, with 27% fully vaccinated.

== Statistics ==
The following chart shows the total reported number of vaccine doses administered, based on data from the Public Health Agency of Sweden's national vaccination registry (updated daily from Tuesday to Friday). Following the vaccination of people under 18 years of age, the statistics for people born between 2003 and 2005 were reported separately starting 19 August 2021.

By 7 April 2021, 93% of nursing home residents had at least one shot and 88% had two shots. For people who are 65 and older who have home care with personal care, 80% had at least one shot.

== Vaccine sharing ==
In early May 2021, it was announced that Sweden has donated 1 million doses of the Oxford vaccine to the global COVAX programme aimed at providing vaccines to the developing world.
