= Visby Hospital =

Hospital in Visby, Sweden

- Region Gotland
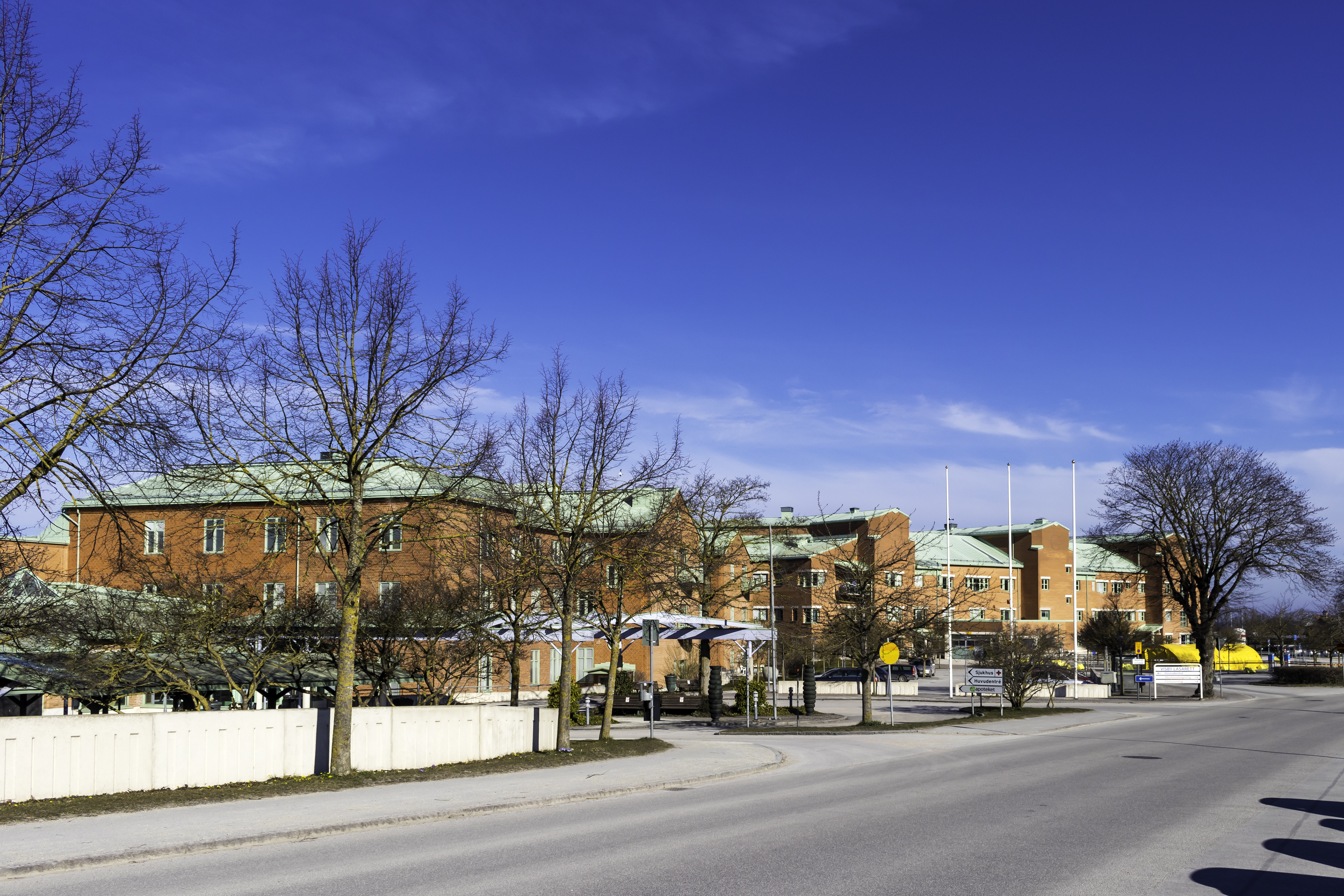
- Hospital exterior in 2020

Geography
- Location: S:t Göransgatan 5; Visby, Sweden
- Coordinates: 57°38′54″N 18°18′02″E

Services
- Emergency department: Yes

Helipads
- Helipad: Yes

History
- Opened: 10 February 1903; 123 years ago

Visby Hospital (Swedish: Visby lasarett) is a public hospital located in Visby, Gotland, Sweden. The only hospital on the island, it is managed by Region Gotland. It maintains an emergency department with a helipad for emergency medical transport to the mainland. There is also an intensive care unit, maternity ward, and various other specialised departments.

Formalised healthcare on the island Gotland date back to 1782, when a small eight-bed facility opened near the Helige Andes church ruin in response to a royal decree. After outgrowing two successive locations, the current hospital opened in 1903 at Strandåkern. The facility featured electric lighting, running water, and modern drainage systems. A major reconstruction project was completed in 1997 to modernise the infrastructure.

Visby Hospital's status as the sole medical facility on Gotland presents operational challenges. Despite serving a permanent population of only around 61,000, the hospital maintains comprehensive services due to the difficulty of patient transfers to the mainland. As of 2024, it had the highest number of beds per inhabitant in Sweden. The hospital experienced significant strain during the COVID-19 pandemic, which led it to establish temporary treatment facilities and reorganise its emergency department. Following the Russian invasion of Ukraine in 2022, Visby Hospital updated its disaster preparedness protocols, coordinating with the Swedish Armed Forces. The hospital was recognised as the third-best medium-sized hospital in Sweden by Dagens Medicin for 2014.

== History ==
=== Background and early years (1782–1899) ===
Following a royal decree asking each Swedish county to establish a hospital, a small facility with eight beds opened in Visby in 1782 near the Helige Andes church ruin. After it was outgrown, a hospital with 42 beds was built along Norra Kyrkogatan in the 1830s to replace it. This facility too became overcrowded, and so a new one was constructed at Strandåkern for approximately 441,356 SEK. It was modelled after the hospital in Eksjö. When it opened on 10 February 1903, Visby Hospital was considered state-of-the-art. Electric lighting was powered by a steam engine and accumulator battery. Other amenities included running water, heated pipes, a modern drainage system, and eight telephones. The hospital initially operated with a very small staff, consisting of one lead physician, four nurses, and five nursing assistants.

=== Continued operation and expansion (1900–1999) ===
By the late 20th century, the hospital's original facilities were considered outdated, and so a significant reconstruction project began in 1990. It was completed in 1997, at a final cost of approximately 620 million SEK.

=== COVID-19 pandemic and civil preparedness (2000–present) ===
A small fire in a dishwasher occurred at Visby Hospital in August 2017. Although the fire did not spread and no injuries were reported, a subsequent internal report written by a senior physician at Visby highlighted perceived deficiencies in response, including uncertainty about the location of fire extinguishers and delays in contacting emergency services. The incident was further compounded by SOS Alarm's difficulties in locating the hospital, resulting in a slower response by the rescue service. Later characterising the situation as disorganised, Region Gotland stated they developed an action plan to improve staff training, make more fire extinguishers available, and investigate the issues with SOS Alarm.

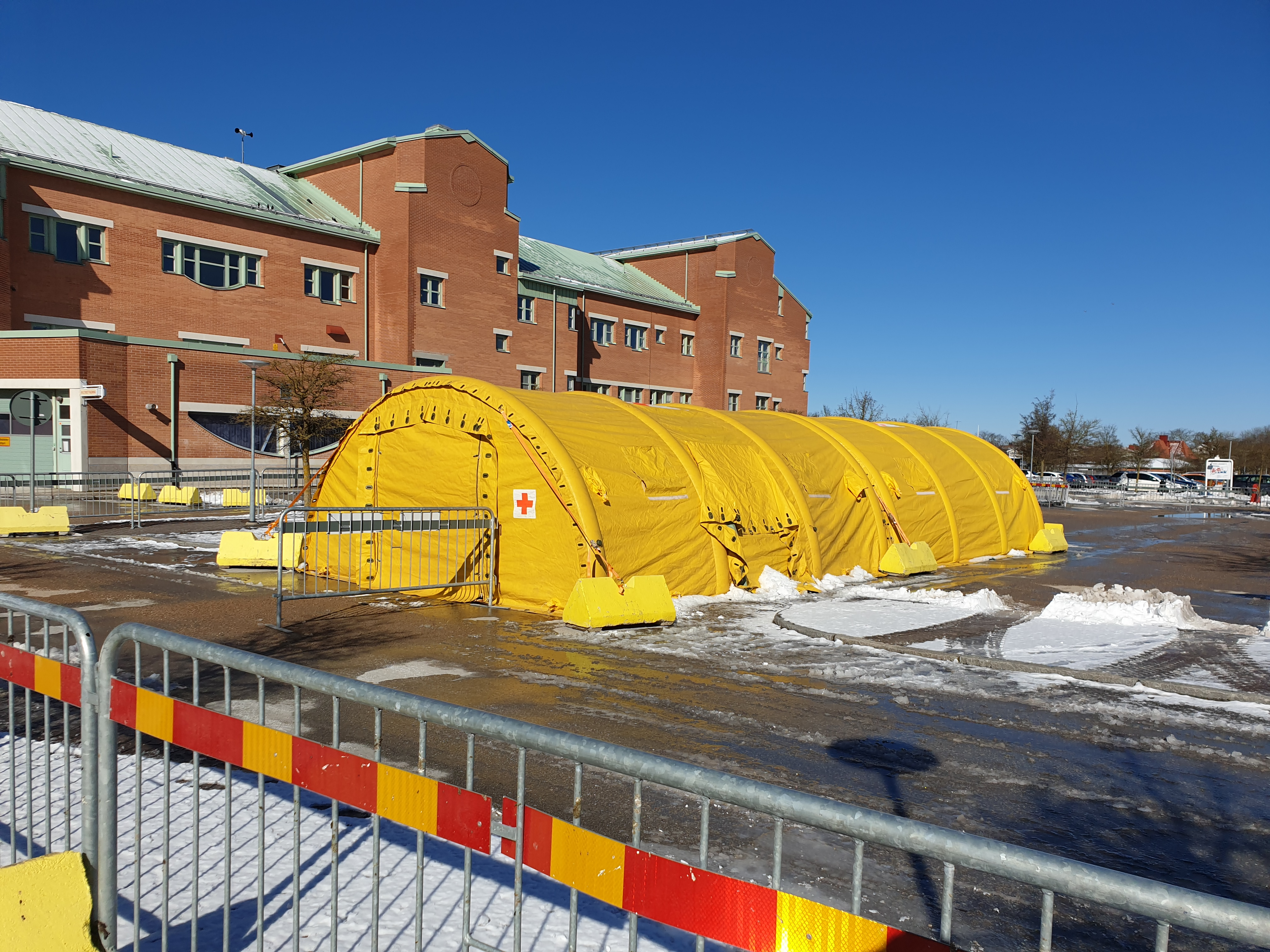
Tent set up outside Visby Hospital in March 2020

Visby Hospital experienced significant strain during the COVID-19 pandemic. In March 2020, Visby Hospital erected a temporary "corona tent" outside the emergency department as part of its response to the COVID-19 pandemic. The tent, which was equipped with heat, electricity, and lighting, was intended to relieve pressure on the emergency department by functioning as an additional waiting and initial assessment area. The emergency department was also reorganised to create separate entrances, exits, and treatment areas for patients with respiratory symptoms. By 1 April, approximately 20–30 COVID-19 tests were conducted daily of healthcare staff and inpatients, as part of infection control and contact tracing efforts. In July, the temporary tent was replaced with five modular buildings, built in collaboration with the Civil Contingencies Agency. The hospital was treating 20 COVID-19 patients by late November, the highest since the outbreak began.

In 2022, amid heightened security concerns following the Russian invasion of Ukraine, Region Gotland intensified planning for civil defence and emergency preparedness. As part of these broader efforts, the hospital updated its disaster preparedness. They worked with the Swedish Armed Forces to develop procedures for handling weapons belonging to wounded soldiers, who would be treated at Visby. Other measures included stockpiling medicines and mandating basic disaster medicine training for all healthcare staff. The following year, Region Gotland and the Swedish Maritime Administration launched an initiative where doctors accompany sea rescue helicopters in the event of a maritime emergency. In March 2026, an issue with instrument sterilisation technology prompted the hospital to cancel non-emergency surgeries. In the aftermath, it received support from both the Karolinska University Hospital and the Swedish Armed Forces.

== Facilities and operations ==
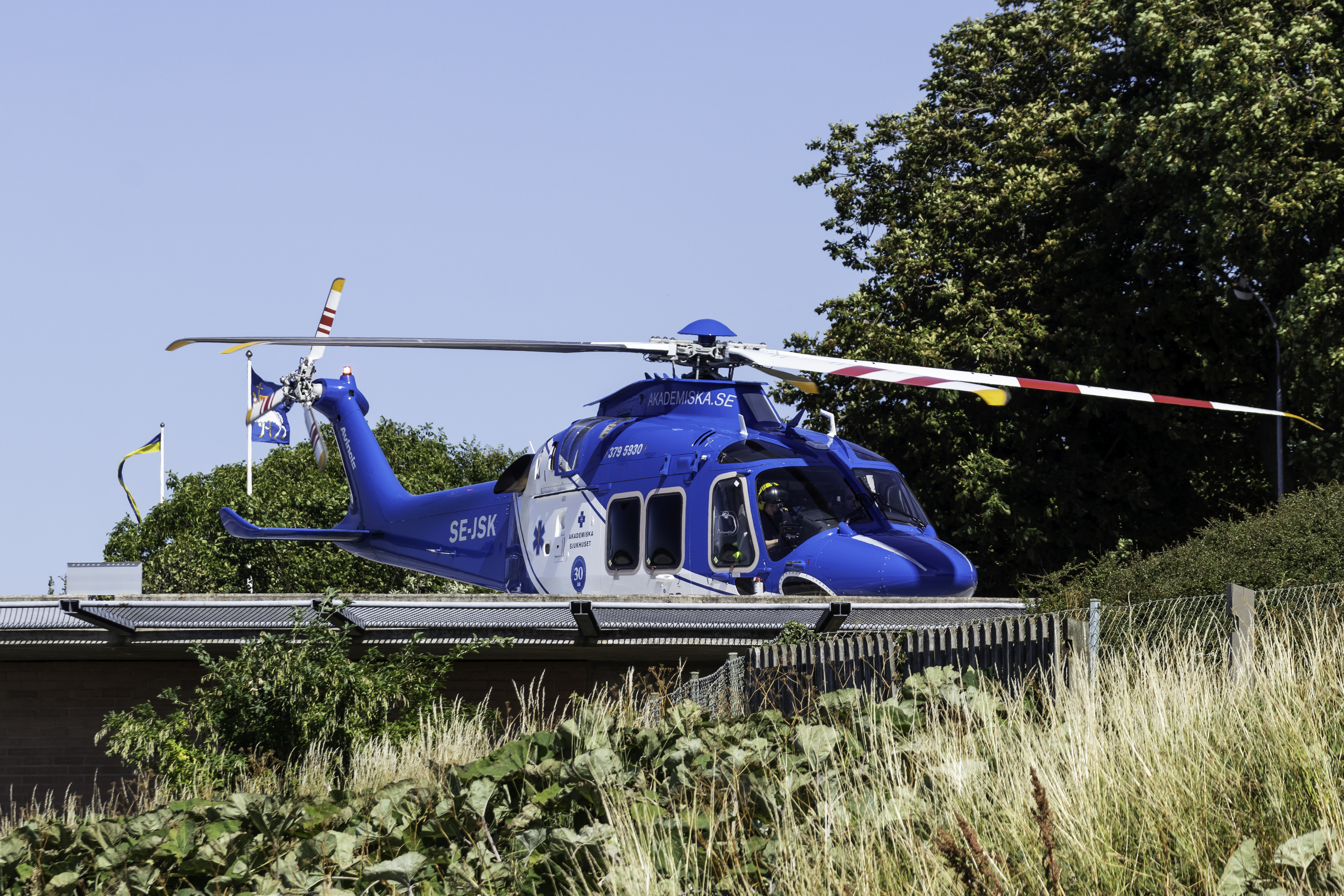
Helicopter ambulance at Visby Hospital in 2023

Visby is the only hospital on the island of Gotland. It is managed by Region Gotland, unique in Sweden as both a region and municipality. Despite a small permanent population base of approximately 61,000, Visby maintains an emergency department, maternity ward, and intensive care unit. The geographic isolation inherent to the island location makes transferring patients to the mainland difficult. As of 2024, Visby Hospital had the highest number of beds per inhabitant in the country. The hospital's intensive care unit had five beds as of November 2020. They also have a blood donation centre. There used to be a library for patients but it was closed in 2017; only the medical library remains. Visby Hospital operates a helipad for emergency medical transport. The heated concrete landing area has a diametre of 10 m (33 ft), set in a designated area at ground level with a diametre of 37.4 m (123 ft). Approved only for visual flight rules, the facility is equipped with a radio beacon for landing and rescue equipment.

== Recognition ==
It was named the third-best medium-sized hospital in Sweden by Dagens Medicin for 2014.
