= SmiNet =

- Type: System for communicable disease surveillance
- Website: www.folkhalsomyndigheten.se/sminet/

SmiNet is a system for communicable disease surveillance in Sweden, established in 2004. Practicing doctors and laboratories can report individual cases of notifiable communicable diseases in Sweden on SmiNet. Suspected cases of COVID-19 are reported on SmiNet, using the form designed for SARS. SmiNet merges the laboratory results to the clinical case records of the individual using their Social Security number. SmiNet also contains tools for outbreak investigation, contact tracing and case management. During the first year of inception, SmiNet received 54,980 clinical notifications and 32,765 laboratory notifications, which generated 58,891 case records. A 2011 study found that the stakeholders considered SmiNet to deliver useful information for health policy decision making.
