= Notifiable diseases in Sweden =

Diseases which must be reported to Swedish authorities

A notifiable disease is one which that has to be reported to the government authorities as required by law. In Sweden, over 50 diseases are classified as notifiable. The notifiable diseases come under four categories : notifiable, mandatory contact tracing required, dangerous to public health (allmänsfarliga) and dangerous to the society (samhällsfarliga). As per the Swedish law, notifiable diseases should be reported by the laboratories, doctor treating the patient or performing autopsy. The report is sent through an electronic system called SmiNet to the Public Health Agency of Sweden. As of January 2018, the only three diseases classified as dangerous to society are small pox, Ebola and severe acute respiratory syndrome (SARS).

== List of notifiable diseases ==
Disease	Notifiable	Contact tracing required	Dangerous to public health	Dangerous to the society	Reference
Anthrax	Yes	Yes	Yes	No	
Atypical mycobacterium infection	Yes	No	No	No	
Avian influenza A (H5N1)	Yes	Yes	Yes	No	
Beta-hemolytic Streptococcus Group A invasive infection	Yes	No	No	No	
Botulism	Yes	Yes	No	No	
Brucellosis	Yes	Yes	No	No	
Campylobacteriosis	Yes	Yes	Yes	No	
Carbapenemase producing Enterobacteriaceae infection	Yes	Yes	No	No	
Chlamydial infection	Yes	Yes	No	No	
Cholera	Yes	Yes	Yes	No	
Cryptosporidiosis	Yes	Yes	No	No	
Dengue	Yes	No	No	No	
Diphtheria	Yes	Yes	Yes	No	
Ebola virus infection	Yes	Yes	Yes	Yes	
Echinococcosis	Yes	Yes	No	No	
Entamoeba histolytica infection	Yes	Yes	No	No	
Enterohemorrhagic E. coli infection	Yes	Yes	Yes	No	
Extended-spectrum beta-lactamase (ESBL) producing Enterobacteriaceae infection	Yes	No	No	No	
Giardiasis	Yes	Yes	Yes	No	
Gonorrhoea	Yes	Yes	Yes	No	
Hemophilus influenzae invasive disease	Yes	No	No	No	
Hepatitis A	Yes	Yes	Yes	No	
Hepatitis B	Yes	Yes	Yes	No	
Hepatitis C	Yes	Yes	Yes	No	
Hepatitis D	Yes	Yes	Yes	No	
Hepatitis E	Yes	Yes	Yes	No	
HIV infection	Yes	Yes	Yes	No	
HTLV 1 or 2 infection	Yes	Yes	Yes	No	
Influenza	Yes	No	No	No	
Legionella infection	Yes	Yes	No	No	
Leptospirosis	Yes	No	No	No	
Listeriosis	Yes	Yes	No	No	
Malaria	Yes	No	No	No	
Measles	Yes	Yes	No	No	
Meningococcal disease, invasive	Yes	No	No	No	
Methicillin resistant Staphylococcus aureus infection	Yes	Yes	Yes	No	
Middle East respiratory syndrome	Yes	Yes	No	No	
Mumps	Yes	Yes	No	No	
Paratyphoid fever	Yes	Yes	Yes	No	
Pertussis	Yes	Yes	No	No	
Plague	Yes	Yes	Yes	No	
Penumococcal invasive disease	Yes	No	No	No	
Pneumococcus with reduced susceptibility to Penicillin infection	Yes	Yes	Yes	No	
Poliomyelitis	Yes	Yes	Yes	No	
Psittacosis/Ornithosis	Yes	Yes	No	No	
Puumala virus infection (nephropthy epidemic)	Yes	No	No	No	
Q fever	Yes	No	No	No	
Rabies	Yes	Yes	Yes	No	
Rubella	Yes	Yes	No	No	
Salmonellosis	Yes	Yes	Yes	No	
SARS	Yes	Yes	Yes	Yes	
Shigellosis	Yes	Yes	Yes	No	
Smallpox	Yes	Yes	Yes	Yes	
Syphilis	Yes	Yes	Yes	No	
Tetanus	Yes	No	No	No	
Trichinellosis	Yes	Yes	No	No	
Tuberculosis	Yes	Yes	Yes	No	
Tularemia	Yes	No	No	No	
Typhoid fever	Yes	Yes	Yes	No	
Vancomycin resistant Enterococci infection	Yes	Yes	No	No	
Variant Creutzfeldt-Jakob disease	Yes	No	No	No	
Vibrio infection excluding Cholera	Yes	Yes	No	No	
Viral hemorrhagic fevers excluding dengue fever and nephropathia epidemics	Yes	Yes	Yes	No	
Viral meningoencephalitis	Yes	No	No	No	
Yellow fever	Yes	No	No	No	
Yersiniosis	Yes	Yes	No	No	
