= Swedish Agency for Health Technology Assessment and Assessment of Social Services =

Agency overview
- Formed: 1987
- Type: Governmental agency
- Headquarters: Stockholm
- Employees: 85
- Agency executive: Susanna Axelsson, Director-general
- Parent agency: Ministry of Health and Social Affairs
- Key document: SFS 2007:1233
- Website: www.sbu.se/en

The Swedish Agency for Health Technology Assessment and Assessment of Social Services (Swedish: Statens beredning för medicinsk och social utvärdering, SBU) previously the Swedish Council on Health Technology Assessment is an independent Swedish governmental agency tasked with assessing and evaluating methods in use in healthcare and social services. SBU is tasked with summarizing and communicating evidence and is a knowledge center for both healthcare and social services in Sweden. The agency performs review by systematically searching the literature, evaluating, assuring quality, and weighing together results. SBU does not carry out any original research beyond meta-analysis, systematic review or health technology assessment (HTA). It is one of the world's oldest HTA agencies that started conducting systematic reviews in 1987.

== About ==
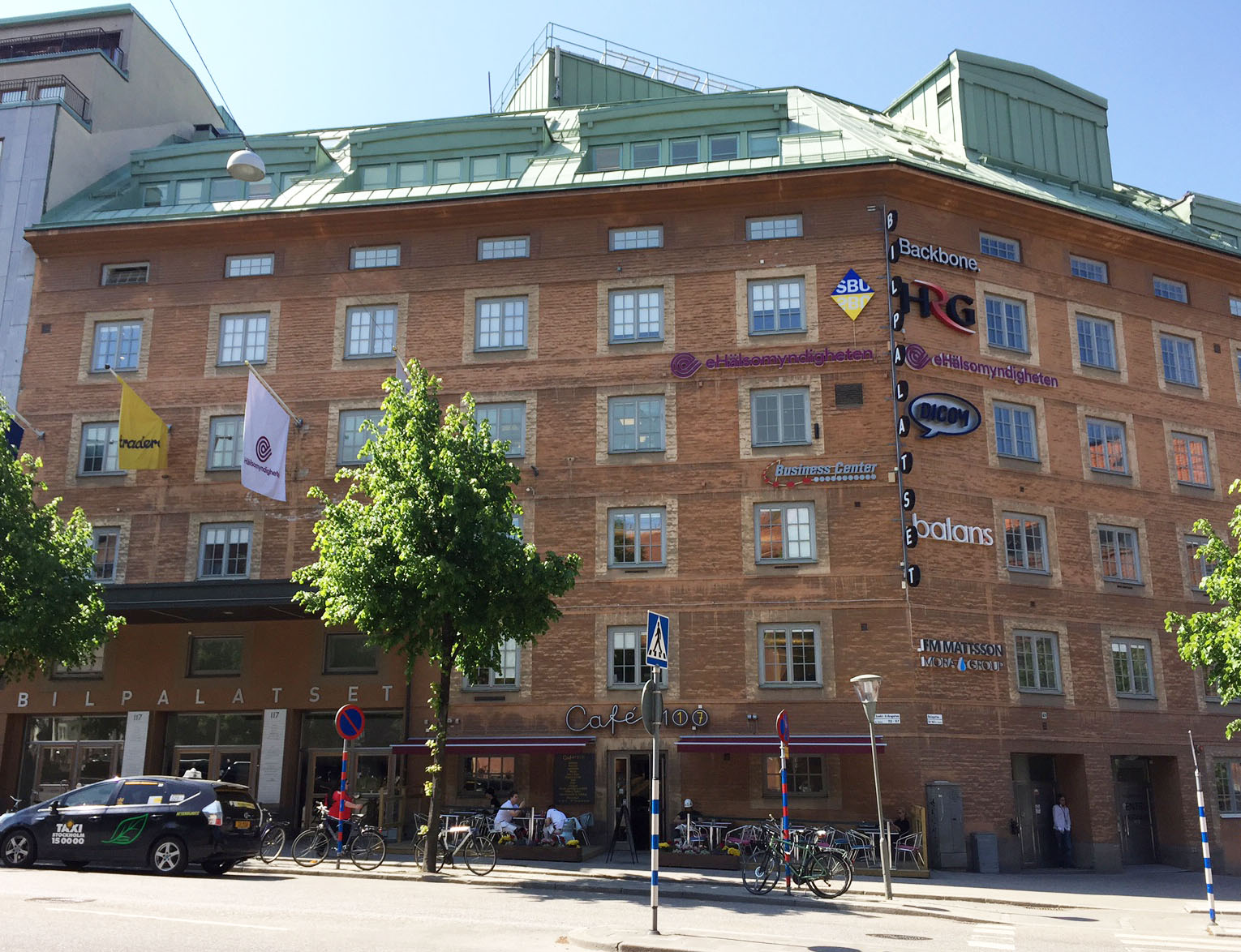
SBU's offices at S:t Eriksgatan in Stockholm.

SBU is tasked with evaluating methods which are in use in healthcare and social services, including both established and new methods. The aim is to based upon current and well-executed research – evaluate what effect interventions and methods are known to have; whether there are any risks involved; whether the interventions provide benefit in relation to cost; as well as raising ethical questions. SBU's independent assessment are aimed to support all who make decisions in healthcare and social services, from policy to individual treatment. SBU is also tasked in pointing to areas where evidence is lacking and further research is necessary for evaluation.

Within Swedish healthcare and social services all employees are by law required to work according to scientific evidence and "proven experience" (a concept in Swedish law). It is not deemed possible for a single individual to follow the full body of scientific research and therefore SBU is tasked to sort, critically review and summarize results. SBU performs systemic reviews and assessments which include analysis of medical, economic, ethical and social aspects of various methods.

SBU is a member organisation of The International Network of Agencies for Health Technology Assessment (INAHTA), and the European Network for Health Technology Assessment (EUnetHTA). SBU starting in 1987 and is one of the oldest national agencies for review of health technologies.

SBU made the Cochrane Library of systematic reviews available for free in all of Sweden between 2005 and 2013.

== Publications ==
SBU has released the book "Testing Treatments" by Imogen Evans, Hazel Thornton, Paul Glasziou, and Cochrane Collaboration founder Iain Chalmers in a Swedish translation that is freely available.

=== Reports ===
SBU has a history of taking on controversial queries and assessing the scientific validity of them. In 2016 SBU issued a report which was highly critical to the triad involved in diagnosing shaken baby syndrome. The report (available in full in English) found only low to very-low quality evidence supporting any of the claims in the triad.

In 2016 SBU found scant evidence of any non-radiological method of age determination. In general, SBU found the literature to indicate that variation between individuals was too large to allow age to be estimated based on physical traits (i.e. height or stage of puberty). This had implications on the legal status of unaccompanied minors seeking asylum in the EU and Sweden, causing some controversy.

In 2007 SBU assessed the use of light therapy to combat seasonal affective disorder, finding no evidence to support the claim. This led to the shut-down of multiple light-clinics in Sweden.

== See also ==
- Agency for Healthcare Research and Quality (AHRQ – United States)
- National Institute for Health and Care Excellence (NICE – United Kingdom)
