= Swedish government response to the COVID-19 pandemic =

In response to COVID-19, the Public Health Agency of Sweden issued a series of infographics in different languages describing how to protect oneself and others from infection.

Sweden's unique response to the COVID-19 pandemic has been the subject of significant controversy in both domestic and international circles. Unlike most countries, which strongly recommended or introduced widespread sector closures, quarantining, and lockdown measures to curb the spread of the coronavirus disease 2019, the government of Sweden took a more lenient approach to the pandemic, only pursuing social distancing measures such as bans on large gatherings and limited travel restrictions.

Sweden had made preparations for a pandemic in previous years, with the Public Health Agency of Sweden designated as the responsible body in a disease outbreak but without the authority to pass laws itself. In the Swedish political system, the cabinet with legislative authority is mandated to follow the advice of government agencies (in this case the Public Health Agency) and very rarely overrules this, as ministerial governance is prohibited under the Basic Laws of Sweden. Crisis management in Sweden instead follows the "principle of responsibility".

Upon the outbreak of the COVID-19 pandemic, the Public Health Agency initiated contact tracing and outlined its strategy to protect the country's most vulnerable citizens and prevent the health care system from being overwhelmed. As the outbreak spread, the agency advised those with respiratory symptoms to avoid social contacts, work from home if possible, minimise travel, and adhere to social distancing. The government passed a law banning large gatherings, and secondary and higher education institutions were advised to switch to distance education. Press conferences and public communications campaigns were also launched. Unlike most other countries, face masks were not recommended in public or healthcare settings.

On 18 December 2020, Stefan Löfven, the prime minister of Sweden, announced new and tougher restrictions and recommendations including the use of face masks in public transportation and closure of all non-essential public services. In January 2021, a new pandemic law was passed that allows for the use of lockdown measures and legally limited some gatherings. Further measures were introduced in July and December 2021, such as vaccine passports.

Reception for the government's response has been mixed. An independent commission was launched to evaluate the measures taken by the government, the administrative health authorities, and regional municipalities. The commission criticized the response of the government, citing among other things a failure to protect the elderly population, that the Swedish response was marked by slowness, with initial measures "insufficient to stop or even substantially limit the spread of the virus in the country," and that the Swedish healthcare system would face long-term consequences due to "the price of extreme pressure on staff and of cancelled and postponed care." In their final report, the commission described Sweden not introducing lockdowns as "fundamentally correct" for maintaining personal freedoms, but were critical of the decisions not to introduce "more rigorous and intrusive disease prevention and control measures" in February and March 2020.

Sweden's unique approach also became a divisive topic of debate, receiving significant international media coverage and criticism both domestically and internationally, and with those who oppose or support public health restrictions often citing the Swedish response as an example.

== Background ==
=== Outbreak of a novel coronavirus disease ===
On 12 January, the World Health Organization (WHO) confirmed that a novel coronavirus (nCoV) was the cause of a respiratory illness in a cluster of people in Wuhan, in Hubei, China, who had initially come to the WHO's attention on 31 December 2019. This cluster was initially linked to the Huanan Seafood Wholesale Market in Wuhan City. A few days later, on 16 January, the Swedish Public Health Agency issued a press release highlighting the discovery of the novel coronavirus, and the agency monitoring the situation. The risk of spread to Sweden was described as "very low" as there was yet no evidence that the virus could spread between humans, but they recommended that individuals developing cough or fever after visiting Wuhan should seek medical care, and asked for healthcare professionals to be observant.

After the World Health Organization classified the novel Coronavirus as a Public Health Emergency of International Concern on 30 January and demanded that all member states should cooperate to prevent further spread of the virus, the Agency requested for the Swedish government to classify the novel disease as a notifiable infectious disease in the Swedish Communicable Diseases Act as both dangerous to public health (allmänfarlig) and dangerous to society (samhällsfarlig), where contact tracing is required, giving the disease the same legislative status as Ebola, SARS and Smallpox. The agency also announced that they have analysing methods that can diagnose a case of the novel disease ‘within hours’ after testing, and that such tests had already been carried out, but that all had turned out negative.

=== Planning ===
Following the 2005 outbreak of the H5N1 avian flu, Sweden drafted their first national pandemic plan which since then had undergone several revisions. Since a 2008 revision to prepare for the 2009 swine flu pandemic, the plan includes the formation of a National Pandemic Group (NPG) in the event of a possible pandemic. The group involves several Swedish government agencies and defines each agency's role.

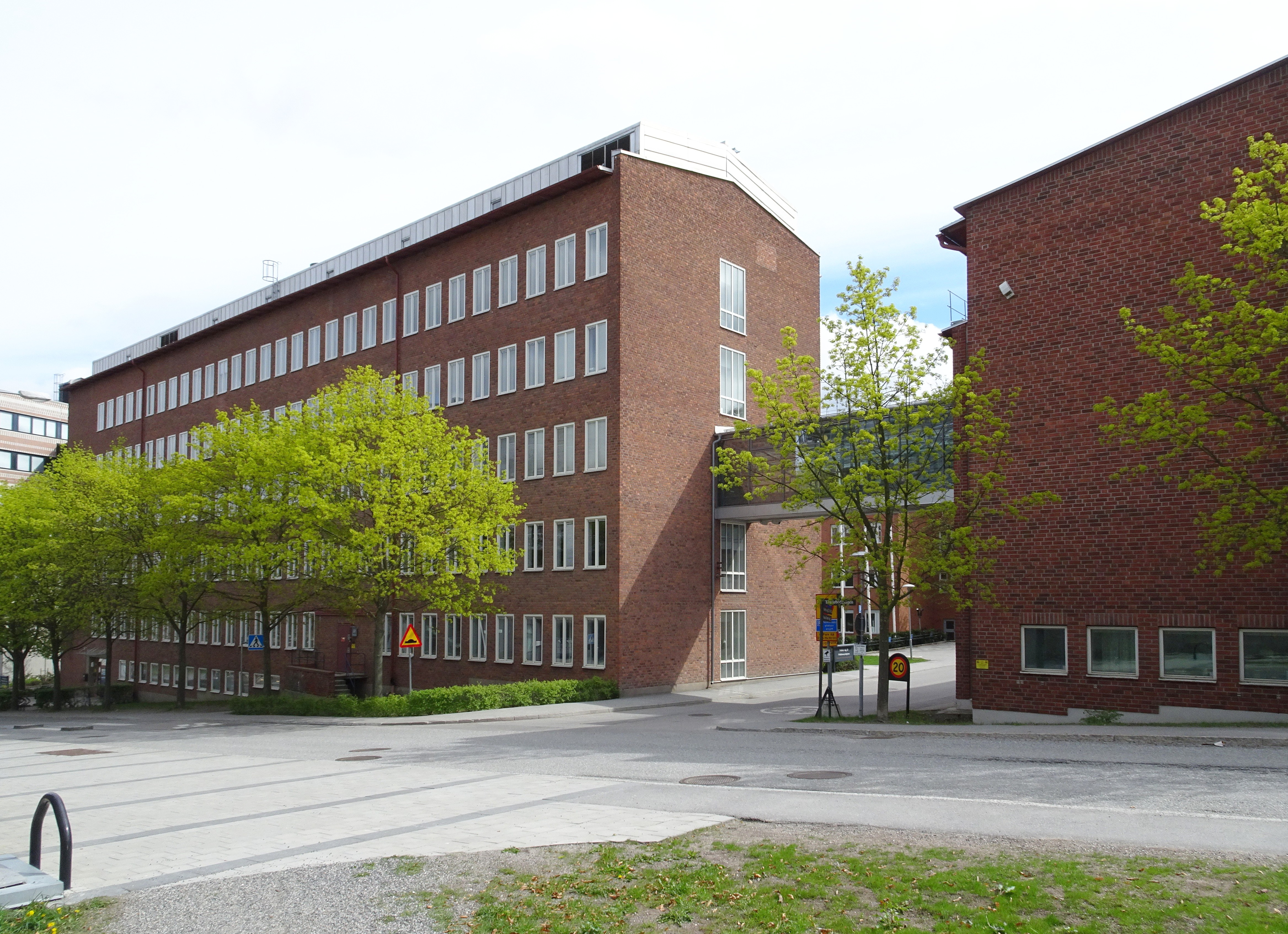
The Public Health Agency

The plan states that the Public Health Agency of Sweden will be the expert agency responsible for monitoring diseases with a pandemic potential, and with the mandate to assemble the National Pandemic Group to coordinate pandemic preparations and strategies on a national level between the relevant agencies. The pandemic group includes four additional Swedish government agencies: the Swedish Civil Contingencies Agency, the Swedish Medical Products Agency, the Swedish National Board of Health and Welfare and the Swedish Work Environment Authority, as well as the county administrative boards of Sweden and the employer's organisation Swedish Association of Local Authorities and Regions.

Swedish crisis management is built on a principle of responsibility which means that the organisation who is responsible for an area of activity under normal circumstances is also responsible for that area of activity during a crisis. As the Public Health Agency of Sweden, headed by director general Johan Carlson, is the agency responsible of monitoring and preventing the spread of infectious diseases, the agency had a central role in the Swedish response to the pandemic. The Public Health Agency also tasked with having a coordinating role for the national response to a pandemic according to the National Pandemic Plan, together with the Swedish Civil Contingencies Agency headed by Dan Eliasson and the Swedish National Board of Health and Welfare headed by Olivia Wigzell.

=== Preparedness ===
In 2013 risk and impact assessments by the Swedish Civil Contingencies Agency, the Swedish expert agency on crisis management, the risk of Sweden in the future being affected by a severe pandemic was assessed as "high" with a "catastrophic" impact on human health and economics. They believed that a future pandemic would be inevitable within 5–50 years.

In the 2019 Global Health Security Index of the ‘most prepared’ countries in the world for an epidemic or a pandemic published by the Johns Hopkins Center for Health Security, Sweden was ranked 7th overall. Sweden received high rankings regarding prevention of the emergence of a new pathogen, early detection and reporting of an epidemic of international concern and having a low risk environment. However, the Swedish healthcare system received a lower score, questioning if it was sufficient and robust enough to treat the sick and protect health workers. (Note: The index is based on 140 questions, grouped into 85 subindicators, 34 indicators and 6 categories, with countries being ranked overall and for each category; Prevention: Prevention of the emergence or release of pathogens (Sweden ranked 2nd), Detection and Reporting: Early detection and reporting for epidemics of potential international concern (7th), Rapid Response: Rapid response to and mitigation of the spread of an epidemic (14th), Health System: Sufficient and robust health system to treat the sick and protect health workers (20th), Compliance with International Norms: Commitments to improving national capacity, financing plans to address gaps, and adhering to global norms (11th), and Risk Environment: Overall risk environment and country vulnerability to biological threats (6th))

In 2013, the Swedish Civil Contingencies Agency investigated Sweden's ability to cope with a pandemic through a simulation where a severe avian influenza infects a third of the population, out of which 190,000 gets severely ill, and up to 10,000 die from the disease. They concluded that Sweden was generally well prepared, with pandemic plans on both national and regional level, but that the health-care system would be the weak link. They noted that Swedish hospitals were already under heavy burden, and wouldn't have the capacity to treat everyone who become sick, even when alternative facilities (like schools and sports centres) were used as hospitals. They also pointed out that issues concerning prioritising, including triage, would become central during the crisis, and that they believed this subject needed to be addressed. Before the outbreak of the new coronavirus, Sweden had a relatively low number of hospital beds per capita, with 2.2 beds per 1000 people (2017), and intensive care unit (ICU) beds per capita of 5.8 per 100,000 people (2012). Both numbers were lower than most countries' in the EU. The total number of ICU beds in Swedish hospitals was 526.

By the time of the Fall of the Berlin Wall in 1989, the Swedish Defence Forces was equipped with a total of 35 field hospitals, with what some considered to be the most modern battlefield medicine in the world, with the Swedish Navy having an additional 15 hospitals. The field hospitals had a combined capacity of treating 10,000 patients and performing 1000 surgeries every 24 hours, as well as stockpiles with drugs, medical supplies and personal protective equipment to treat 150,000 war casualties. Additionally, the Swedish state had several preparedness hospitals and Swedish schools were constructed to be converted into hospital units in case of a military conflict and with a total capacity of treating 125,000 patients, supported by a network of preparedness storages containing medicine and medical equipment.

From 1990 and onwards, the system was gradually dismantled to eventually disappear altogether, with the equipment, including more than 600 new ventilators, being either given away or disposed of. At the start of the 2020 COVID-19 pandemic, the Swedish Defence Forces owned 2 medical units with a total of 96 beds, out of which 16 were ICU beds, and there were no civil preparedness storages for medical equipment left in Sweden. The National Board of Health and Welfare did however keep an emergency storage of reserve ventilators.

Until 2009, the Swedish state-run pharmacy chain Apoteket had the responsibility to ensure drug supply in case of emergency. Following a controversial privatisation, the responsibility was handed over to the private sector. However, a lack of regulations meant that the companies had no incentive to keep a bigger stock than necessary, effectively leaving Sweden without an entity responsible for medicine preparedness.

At the start of the pandemic, the Swedish healthcare system were instead relying on a "just-in-time" deliveries of medication and medical equipment, and Sweden had no medicine manufacturing of its own, which was considered to make the country's drug supply vulnerable as it relied on global trade and long supply lines. The Swedish healthcare system was already experiencing a growing number of backordered drugs in the years leading up to the pandemic.

The lack of medicine preparedness had been strongly criticised in several inquiries and reports since 2013 by a number of Swedish governmental agencies, including the Swedish National Audit Office, the Swedish Defence Research Agency and the Swedish Civil Contingencies Agency. The latter had regarded disturbances in the drug supply as one of their biggest concerns in their annual risk assessments.

== Strategy ==
Infographic representing the epidemiological concept of flattening the curve.

According to the Swedish Public Health Agency, the Swedish strategy aimed to protect its senior and vulnerable citizens, and to slow down the spread of the virus, to keep the healthcare system from getting overwhelmed. They are also mandated by law to make their response based on scientific evidence. The Swedish state epidemiologist Anders Tegnell has questioned the scientific basis of some of the "stricter" measures taken by other governments, including lockdowns and border closures.

"Closedown, lockdown, closing borders – nothing has a historical scientific basis, in my view. We have looked at a number of European Union countries to see whether they have published any analysis of the effects of these measures before they were started and we saw almost none."

— Anders Tegnell, current state epidemiologist of Sweden, in a Nature interview, April 2020

While many countries imposed nationwide lockdowns and curfews, the Swedish government did not propose such measures. The Swedish constitution grants freedom of movement although it can be restricted by law for purposes acceptable in a democratic society. The Swedish laws on communicable diseases (Smittskyddslagen) only allows for quarantining individuals and small areas such as buildings, not for entire geographical areas. Instead, it's mostly based around the individual responsibility. Although the government were later granted more authority for imposing restrictions on transport following a temporary amendment in April, the Swedish authorities considered lockdowns to be unnecessary, as they believed that voluntary measures could be just as effective as bans. Although many considered this to be a 'relaxed' approach, it was defended by the authorities as well as government officials, among them Prime Minister Stefan Löfven, to be more sustainable, as unlike lockdowns, it could be in place for "months, even years" as it wasn't assumed to be likely that the disease could be stopped until a vaccine was produced. Therefore, the Swedish response initially only included measures where an exit strategy wasn't needed. A temporary pandemic law was put in place in January 2021, allowing the government to introduce measures such as limiting the number of visitors in shopping malls and sport halls as well as how many people could gather in private events. The law was abolished in April 2022.

Unlike many European countries, including neighbouring Denmark and Norway, Sweden did not close its preschools or elementary schools as a preventive measure. This was met with criticism within Sweden. According to the Health Agency, the main reasons for not closing schools was that as a preventive measure it lacked support by research or scientific literature, and because of its negative effects on society. They argued that many parents, including healthcare professionals, would have no choice but to stay home from work to care for their children if schools were closed. There was also concern for a situation where elderly people babysit their grandchildren, as they are of bigger risk of severe symptoms in case of infection. According to the agency's estimations, closures of elementary schools and preschools could result in an absence of up to 43,000 healthcare professionals, including doctors, nurses and nurses' assistants, equalling 10 per cent of the total workforce in the sector. Additionally, there was concern of school closures having negative consequences for disadvantaged and vulnerable children, and according to the agency yet no evidence of children playing a major role in the spread of the virus, nor of a high infection rate among children or preschool teachers, and that children who become infected showed mild symptoms. In May, Tegnell said that the decision was right, as the healthcare system would not have managed the situation the past months if Swedish authorities had chosen to close elementary schools. He later said that the decision to close secondary schools might have been unnecessary, because it possibly had little effect in slowing the spread of the disease.

After the Danish government went against the advice of the Danish Health Authority and closed their national borders in March, Tegnell remarked that there were currently no scientific studies supporting border closures to be an effective measure against a pandemic, and that "history has proven it to be completely meaningless measure", and argued that it could, at best, delay the outbreak for one week, and also pointed out that border closures went against the recommendations from the WHO. He later said closures would be "ridiculous" in a situation where the disease had spread across all of Europe, saying that movements within the country were of more concern.

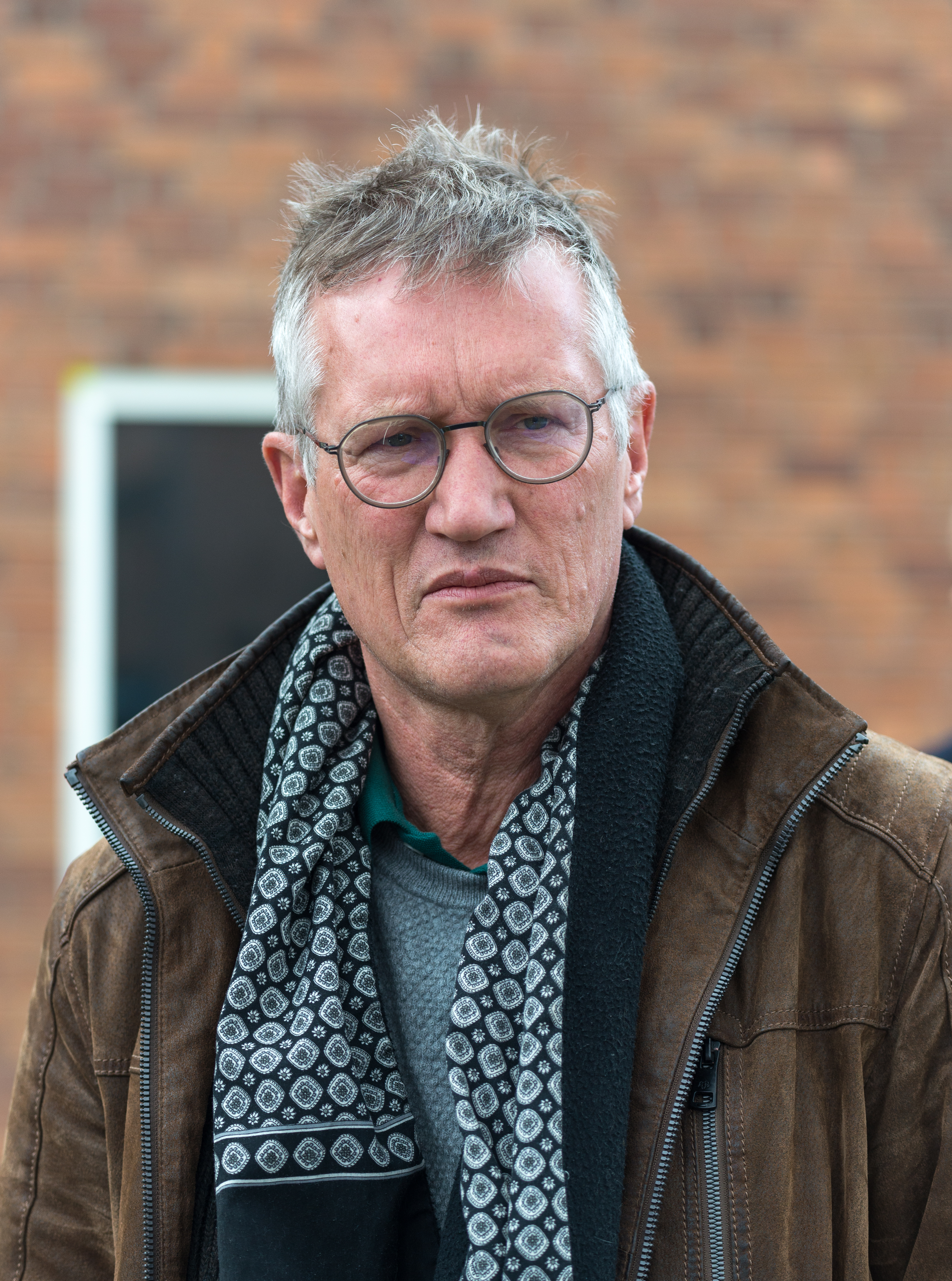
State epidemiologist Anders Tegnell, the architect of the Swedish strategy

Representatives of the Swedish government, as well as its agencies, have repeatedly denied that pursuing herd immunity is part of the Swedish strategy, as suggested by foreign press and scientists in and outside Sweden. According to state epidemiologist Anders Tegnell, herd immunity had not been calculated in the strategy, and if it had been the goal, "we would have done nothing and let coronavirus run rampant". But he believed, in April 2020, that Sweden would benefit from herd immunity in the long run, and reasoned that all countries would eventually have to achieve it to beat the virus. In May 2020 he said that he believed it was unlikely that Sweden, or any other country, would ever reach full herd immunity, and also that it would be a mistake to base a strategy on a hypothetical vaccine, as it would likely be years until there is a vaccine that can be distributed to an entire population. Instead, he believed COVID-19 was something "we’re going to have to live with for a very long time". However, in August 2020, email exchanges obtained by Swedish journalists under Sweden’s freedom of information laws found that Tegnell had discussed a herd immunity strategy in mid-March 2020.

As the strategy was built by the health experts at the Public Health Agency without any influence from the government, it was built solely on a public health perspective, without any political considerations to the economy. The agency did however regard the economy as part of its broader public health considerations, due to unemployment and a weakening economy typically leading to a poorer public health.

Although Sweden was regarded to have succeeded with making sure the hospitals would keep at pace, it admitted to have failed with protecting its elderly, as 47% of its deaths had occurred among nursing home residents or those receiving home care. The Health Agency saw the spread at the homes as their biggest concern, but "not as a failure of our overall strategy, but as a failure of our way to protect the elderly". In an interview with Sveriges Radio in early June, Tegnell was asked if he would have done things differently if he could ‘back the tape’, to which he replied that Sweden should have done more earlier during the outbreak. This received extensive coverage in national as well as international media and was interpreted as he was distancing himself from the Swedish strategy. Tegnell however denied this being the case, and said they still believed the strategy being good, but that "you can always improve things, especially in hindsight". When asked to give examples, he said that it would have been much better if they had been more prepared at nursing homes, and that it would have been better if the testing capacity had been increased earlier on during the outbreak. He also said that the closure of secondary schools might have been unnecessary.

== Measures ==
On 10 March 2020, responding to indications of community transmission, the Public Health Agency advised everyone with respiratory infections, even mild cases, to refrain from social contacts where there is a risk of spreading the virus, in private as well as working life. They also ask health care staff working with risk groups, including nursing homes, not work if they have any symptoms of respiratory infection. Relatives of elderly were advised to avoid unnecessary visits at hospitals and in facilities for elderly, and never visit if there are any respiratory symptoms.

Face masks were initially not recommended or were actively discouraged by authorities for the general public and in healthcare settings. On June 25, 2020, masks were recommended in care home and healthcare settings only in cases of treating COVID-19 patients. In December 2020, it was announced that masks would be recommended on Stockholm public transport from January 2021, the first time authorities had advised the public to wear them. Some healthcare institutions, care homes and schools implemented rules outside of government guidance.

As COVID-19 progressed so did the measures taken. On 10 January 2021 an Act was passed that provided the Government the right to place rules on curbing public and private gatherings, and limit international and domestic travel. The law was a temporary pandemic law and allowed for Sweden to place time limits on when businesses can open and close. On 30 June 2021 a travel ban was introduced on anyone from the United States or EEA. Exceptions were on travellers from Denmark, Finland, Iceland and Norway. The ban was set to be lifted on 31 October 2021.

Regulations were then created to take place on 1 July 2021. Numbers of people who could be in one place such as a restaurant, or store was limited, as well as social gatherings being limited to no more than 8 people. Remote work was recommended if possible, and on 17 March 2020 school was made fully online. Furthermore, recommendation to be tested after staying abroad was added and will be extended.

Starting from 29 September 2021 more pandemic-related restrictions were lifted. Advice was reintroduced on 8 December 2021 to work from home, wear face masks on public transport and free COVID-19 testing was reintroduced in response to the Omicron variant.

=== Social distancing ===
On 16 March 2020, the agency recommended that people over 70 should limit close contact with other people, and avoid crowded areas such as stores, public transport and public spaces. At the end of March, 93% of those older than 70 said that they were following the recommendations from the health service to some extent, with the majority having decreased their contacts with friends and family. In May, the agency looked at easing the recommendations for the 'young elderly' of good health, but ultimately decided against it. They did however encourage those over 70 not to isolate completely in their homes, but to go outside for walks while still following the recommendations. On 16 March 2020, they also recommended that employers should require remote work. One month later, statistics showed that roughly half the Swedish workforce was remote working. The following day, the agency recommended that secondary schools and universities use distance learning, with schools following suit all over the country. The decision to recommend distance education for secondary and tertiary education, but not for elementary schools, was that studies at secondary schools and universities to a higher extent require commuting and travelling, and that students would not depend on parental care while not in schools, and school closings therefore did not risk interrupting society. In May, it was announced that the Health Agency were to lift the recommendations on 15 June, and thereby allowing secondary schools and universities to open up as normal after the summer holidays.

In April, many of the organisations running the public transport systems for the Swedish counties had reported a 50% drop in public transport usage, including Kalmar Länstrafik in Kalmar County, Skånetrafiken in Skåne County, Stockholm Public Transit in Stockholm County, and Västtrafik in Västra Götaland County. In Stockholm, the streets grew increasingly emptier, with a 30% drop in the number of cars, and 70% fewer pedestrians.

In mid-May, and on the request of the Public Health Agency, the Swedish Transport Agency temporarily suspended the regulations that allowed for passenger transport on lorries or trailers pulled by tractors, trucks or engineering vehicles at graduations and carnivals. The new rules were to be in place between 15 May and 31 December.

These social distancing recommendations have been effective in part because Swedes tend to have a "disposition to social distancing anyway."

Social distancing rules were tightened in December 2021 in response to an increase in cases driven by the SARS-CoV-2 Omicron variant.

=== Ban on gatherings ===
The same day as the first Swedish death from Covid-19, 11 March, the Swedish government passed a new law at the request of the Public Health Agency, limiting freedom of assembly by banning all public gatherings and events with more than 500 participants, with threat of fines or imprisonment for organisers. Public gatherings and events include arts and entertainment events including theatre, cinema and concerts, religious meetings, demonstrations, lectures, competitive sports, amusement parks, fairs and markets. They do not include gatherings in schools, workplaces, public transport, grocery stores or shopping malls, health clubs or other private events. The ban would apply until further notice. According to the Health Agency, the reasoning behind drawing the line at 500 was to limit long-distance travel within the nation's borders, as bigger events are more likely to attract visitors from all over the country. Although freedom of assembly is protected by the Swedish constitution in the Fundamental Law on Freedom of Expression, the constitution allows for a government to restrict the freedom, if needed to limit the spread of an epidemic. On 27 March the government announced that the ban on public gatherings would be lowered to include all public gatherings of more than 50 people, to further decrease the spread of the infection, again at the request of the Public Health Agency. The agency also recommended that plans for events and gatherings of fewer than 50 people should be preceded by a risk assessment and, if necessary, followed by mitigation measures. Additionally, they recommended that digital meetings should be considered. The ban on large public gatherings had no end-date, and as of late April, the Health Agency was reported as having no plans for when the ban should be lifted.

Starting from 24 November 2020 public events and gatherings were limited to up to eight persons. The participant limits were lifted successively in the summer of 2021, and fully removed on 29 september. With the arrival of the Omicron VOC, indoors public gatherings and events of over 500 people were required to implement vaccine passports from 23 December 2021, and the limit was later reduced to 50 participants.

On 9 February 2022 all bans on gatherings and events (as well as other distancing regulations) were abolished, and from 1 April 2022 Covid-19 was no longer classified as dangerous to the general public or society at large (although reporting requirements stayed in place).

=== Travel ===
On 18 March, the Health Agency recommended that everyone should avoid travelling within the country. This came after signs of ongoing community transmission in parts of the country, due to concern that a rapid spread over the country would make redistribution of healthcare resources more difficult. They also called for the public to reconsider any planned holidays during the upcoming Easter weekend. The calls to avoid travelling and social interactions during the Easter weekend were repeated several times by agency and government officials, among them Prime Minister Stefan Löfven and King Carl XVI Gustaf. Telia, a Swedish multinational mobile network operator, did an analysis of mobile network data during the week of Easter, and found that most Swedes had followed the agency's recommendations to avoid unnecessary travels during the Easter holidays. Overall, travel from the Stockholm region had decreased by 80–90%, and the number of citizens of Stockholm travelling to popular holiday destinations like Gotland and the ski resorts in Åre had fallen with more than 90%. Travel between other regions in Sweden had fallen as well. Ferry-line operator Destination Gotland, who previously had called on their customers to rethink their planned trips for Easter, reported that 85% of all bookings had been rescheduled.

The restrictions on domestic travel were somewhat softened on 13 May, allowing for travels equalling one to two hours from home by car would be allowed under some circumstances to which Löfvén referred to as ‘common sense’, such as not risking to burden healthcare in other regions, keeping contact with others low and not travelling to visit new social contacts, the elderly or those at risk of severe disease. On 4 June, the government announced that the restrictions on domestic travel were to be lifted on 13 June, allowing everyone to freely travel in the country if they were without symptoms and rules on social distancing were followed. However, they cautioned that new restrictions could be introduced if the situation were to worsen, and that the County administrative boards of Sweden were tasked to monitor the situation.

In a press conference on 25 January 2021, foreign minister Ann Linde extended the advisory of the government against all non-essential international travel until 15 April 2021.

== Communication and information ==
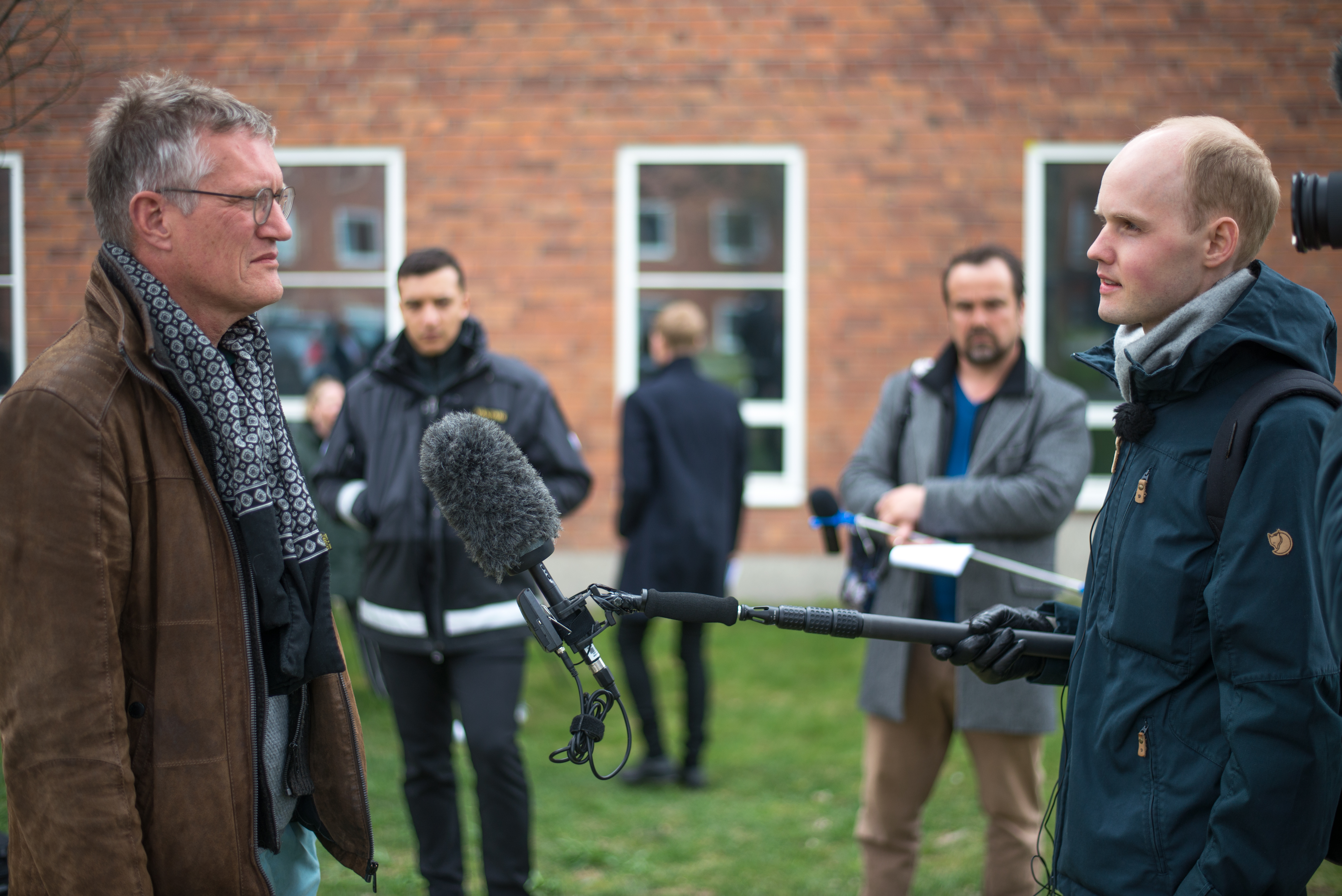
State epidemiologist Anders Tegnell during a press conference outside the Karolinska Institute in Stockholm, Sweden, in 2020

Beginning in March, press conferences were held daily at 14:00 local time, with representatives from the three government agencies responsible for coordinating Sweden's response to the pandemic; the Public Health Agency, usually represented by state epidemiologist Tegnell or deputy state epidemiologist Anders Wallensten, the National Board of Health and Welfare and the Swedish Civil Contingencies Agency. According to the latter, close to one million people followed each press conference on the TV or the radio. The ratings excluded other types of media. For official information on the disease and the situation in Sweden, the authorities referred the public to the website krisinformation.se, which compiles official emergency information from Swedish authorities. The website is operated by the Civil Contingencies Agency, as the agency responsible for emergency information to the public during emergencies. The agency reported a big increase in the number of people visiting the website during the beginning of the pandemic, with 4.5 million views between January and April 2020, compared to 200,000 during the same period in 2019.

In March, the Civil Contingencies Agency received 75 million SEK (€7.4 million) from the government for public service announcements to inform the public about the virus, and how to reduce the spread of the disease to slow down the spread of the virus.

== Legislation ==
On 16 April 2020, the Riksdag passed a bill on a temporary amendment on the Swedish law on infectious diseases (2004:168). The new law granted the Swedish government more authority, by allowing it to make decisions without a preceding vote in the Swedish parliament, the Riksdag. The purpose of the law was to enable the government to make speedy decisions on measures against an ongoing pandemic. The bill had initially been criticised by the parties in opposition and the Council on Legislation for being too vague, but was accepted by the riksdag following a revision defining the measures, and an amendment stating that all measures needed to be reviewed by the parliament, which came after negotiations between the government and the opposition. Thus, the Riksdag would be able to revoke any imposed measures after they had come into effect. The law would only apply for measures linked to the ongoing pandemic, and it would apply for a limited time only. The law came into effect on 18 April 2020, and would last until 20 June 2020. The bill would allow the government to quickly and independently impose measures such as restrictions on transport and closures of bus station and train stations, ferries and ports, businesses such as restaurants, health clubs or malls, libraries and museums, or schools. The law would also allow the government to make decisions on redistribution of medicine and other healthcare equipment, such as personal protective equipment between different healthcare providers, including privately owned companies. The new law would not allow for the government to impose measures to that of would restrict people's ability to go outside, similar to the curfews in other countries, as it would limit people's constitutional right to free movement.

The karensdag, the unpaid first day of sick leave, was temporarily discontinued on 11 March 2020 in an effort to encourage people to stay home if they were experiencing symptoms consistent with COVID-19. On 13 March 2020, the government decided to temporarily abolish the demand of a doctor's certificate for 14 days for people staying home from work due to illness (i.e. sick pay period). Previously a doctor's certificate was needed after seven days.

On 24 March 2020, the government introduced new restrictions to bars and restaurants requiring all service to be table service only. Restaurants were also recommended increase the space between the tables. Venues that do not adhere to the new restrictions could be shut down. Several bars and restaurants were later ordered to close by municipal health inspectors. Initially, the infectious disease control medical officers had the responsibility and mandate to close down establishments not adhering to the restrictions through the Swedish Law on Communicable Diseases, while the municipalities had been given the responsibility for the supervision. This changed when a new temporary legislation came into effect on 1 July 2020, making them the sole regulatory body in the same way as in the Swedish Alcohol Act and the Swedish Food Act. The law were to stay in effect until the end of the year. Beginning on 1 April 2020, all private visits to nursing homes was outlawed by the government. Many municipalities had already forbidden such visits. The national ban was however general, and those in charge of the facilities would be able to make exceptions under special circumstances, provided that the risk of spread of the virus was low.

Following reports of people hoarding medication and concerns of drug shortages, the Medical Products Agency requested for the Swedish government to impose restrictions on purchases. This resulted in a new regulation limiting the amount of drugs purchased at the same occasion to three months worth of consumption, down from a previous limit of one year. The new regulations came to effect on 1 April 2020 and would be in place until further notice, and included to both prescription and over-the-counter drugs.

== Advice against travel abroad ==
The government has issued progressively stricter advisories against travel. Beginning on 17 February 2020, the Swedish Ministry of Foreign Affairs advised against all trips to Hubei, China, as well as non-essential travel to the rest of China apart from Hong Kong and Macau. On 2 March 2020, the Ministry for Foreign Affairs advised against trips to Iran, due to the uncontrolled spread of the COVID-19 in the country. The Swedish Transport Agency also revoked Iran Air's permit for Iranian flights to land in Sweden from the same date. According to the foreign ministry, there were several thousand Swedish citizens in Iran at the time of the ban, many of them with difficulties getting back to Sweden. On 6 March 2020, the Ministry for Foreign Affairs advised against all non-necessary trips to northern Italy, specifically the regions of Piemonte, Liguria, Lombardia, Emilia-Romagna, Trentino-Südtirol, Valle d'Aosta, Veneto, Friuli-Venezia Giulia, Marche and Toscana. Turin, Milan, Venice, Verona, Trieste and Florence are large cities in these regions. The Public Health Agency of Sweden, who initiated the recommendation for the Ministry for Foreign Affairs, stated that the decision was based solely on the strain of the Italian health care system. On similar grounds, the foreign affairs ministry also advised against all non-necessary travel to the city of Daegu and the province of Gyeongbuk in South Korea. The advice regarding travel to Italy was extended 10 March 2020 to include all of its regions. Finally, all international travel was discouraged on 14 March 2020. The advice was to be in place for one month, after which it would be up for review. Travel from non-EU/EEA member states was stopped on 17 March 2020 and unnecessary travel within Sweden was advised against on 19 March.

The foreign ministry estimated that between 40,000 and 60,000 Swedes were stranded abroad in late March 2020. According to Swedish policy, Swedes travelling abroad have their own responsibility to arrange for any return travels, without assistance from Swedish diplomatic missions, and travellers trying to travel home are referred to airlines, travel agencies or insurance companies. Some of those were critical of the foreign ministry, and were asking for help from the Swedish authorities. The foreign ministry were initially reluctant to depart from the policy. However, as a growing number of countries closed their airports and many Swedes found themselves stranded in a foreign country unable to arrange travels themselves, the foreign ministry began work on evacuating Swedish citizens. In early May 2020, the Ministry of Foreign Affairs reported that the only location from which stranded Swedish citizens hadn't been evacuated was The Gambia.

On 7 April 2020, the foreign ministry extended the advice against all non-essential travel abroad until 15 June 2020, when it would again be reconsidered. On 9 May 2020, Swedish foreign minister Ann Linde said that although a decision about an extension was yet to be made, she made clear that travel wouldn't return to normal after 15 June 2020. On 13 May 2020, the Foreign Ministry again extended the advice for non-necessary foreign travel to 15 July 2020. From 30 June 2020, the advice against non-essential travel were lifted for 10 EU countries, namely Belgium, France, Greece, Iceland, Italy, Croatia, Luxembourg, Portugal, Switzerland and Spain, as well as for Monaco, San Marino and the Vatican City. The advice against travel to other countries within the EU, EEA and the Schengen Area would remain in effect until 15 July 2020, while advice were extended until 31 August 2020 for countries outside those areas.

== Vaccination ==
Vaccination against COVID-19 in Sweden started on the of 27 December 2020 after the approval of the Pfizer–BioNTech vaccine by the European Commission. In Sweden, the Public Health Agency has been commissioned by the government to create a vaccination plan. Sveriges riksbank, the central bank of Sweden, predicts that efficient vaccination against COVID-19 has macroeconomic benefits. As of 20 April 2022, 87.1% of people (12 years and older) in Sweden have received at least one dose, with a total of 21,491,717 doses administered.: At least one vaccine has been approved for all age groups 12 and older. Children younger than 12 in high risk groups can also be vaccinated.

== Misinformation ==
Officials from Sweden misrepresented data from a 7 July 2020 report comparing Sweden to Finland to claim that the "closing of schools had no measurable effect on the number of cases of COVID-19 among children," neglecting that testing among Swedish children was almost non-existent when compared to Finnish children. However, the Public Health Agency and the Minister of Education still cited this report as justification for not closing schools.

In April 2020, scientists and physicians criticized the Swedish government for the 105 deaths per day in the country at the time, but the Public Health Agency and Anders Tegnell (the Public Health Agency epidemiologist in charge of the country's pandemic response) wrongly claimed that the actual number was 60 deaths per day in response. The revised government figures later showed that the critics were right.

== Reception ==
=== Corona Commission ===
The Coronavirus Commission (Swedish: Coronakommissionen) is a Swedish independent commission to evaluate the government's response to the COVID-19 pandemic in Sweden. Formed of a panel of 8 experts, the commission was established by the Government of Sweden in 2020 following pressure from the Riksdag.

In December 2020, a report by the commission criticised the government for failing to protect elderly people in aged care due to the high level of community spread. In October 2021, the commission's second report characterised the government's response in early 2020 as "insufficient" and "late".

The commission said in their final report in February 2022 that the government's strategy of not introducing lockdowns, as many other countries had done, was "fundamentally correct" for maintaining individuals' personal freedoms over those in other countries, but was critical of the decisions not to introduce "more rigorous and intrusive disease prevention and control measures" in February and March 2020. It also said that the government had delegated too much responsibility to the Public Health Agency of Sweden and the responsible bodies for decision making were not always clear.

=== Media coverage ===
Many outside Sweden considered the measures taken by the authorities against the pandemic to be significantly different when compared to other countries. As a result, there was a big increase in international news coverage of Sweden. According to the Swedish Institute, the situation was unique as they had never seen such interest in Sweden from mainstream media. There was also an increase in interactions on the coverage, including a higher number of shares on social media. The Swedish strategy was sometimes described as "lax", "laissez-faire", "unorthodox" or "radical", in some cases even as "extreme" or as "Russian roulette". Much of the coverage was neutral, but it was sometimes described in the Swedish press as curious, questioning or critical, and was in some cases accused of being "fake news". In October 2020, Time described it as a "disaster".

Over time, the reporting shifted to being more neutral or nuanced, or sometimes positive, with some speculating that the Swedish policy may be more durable in the long run. A common news story in international media was things being "business as usual" in Sweden, with its citizens ignoring the recommendations to practice social distancing and avoiding unnecessary travel, often accompanied by footage of crowded streets and restaurants. One notable example was an article in the British newspaper The Guardian, claiming that everything in Sweden went on as normal, with Swedes "going about their daily routines". The article attracted particularly widespread notice, and was quoted by many European newspapers. The Guardian was also accused of misleading their readers in another article, by selectively choosing quotes and putting them in a different context, and by disproportionately giving room to critical voices from Sweden in their reporting. Some reported that Sweden chose not to lock down to protect the economy.

Foreign news outlets often described Sweden as pursuing a herd immunity strategy. This was echoed by US president Donald Trump, who in a press briefing told the assembled media that Sweden was "suffering very greatly" due to what he referred to as "the herd", and that the US, if it had not taken much stricter social distancing measures, "would have lost hundreds of thousands more people". Responding partly to Trump's remarks, which she described by using the word "misinformation", Swedish foreign minister Ann Linde said that the "so-called Swedish strategy" was one of many myths about Sweden, and described it as "absolutely false". Linde said that the Swedish goal was no different from most other countries: to save lives, hinder the spread of the virus and make the situation manageable for the health system, while Sweden's state epidemiologist, Anders Tegnell, when asked about Trump's remarks, said that in his opinion Sweden was doing relatively well, and was no worse off than New York. Remarks similar to Linde's have also been made by Lena Hallengren, Minister for Health and Social Affairs, who disagreed with the belief that Sweden had a radically different approach to the virus compared to other countries, saying she believed that there were only differences in two major regards: not shutting down schools, and not having regulations forcing people to remain in their homes.

Linde has also spoken out against reports of Swedes not practising social distancing, calling it another "myth" in the reporting about Sweden, and she said Sweden's combination of recommendations and legally binding measures had so far proven effective. Swedish experts critical of the Swedish strategy were often quoted in international media, among them immunologist Cecilia Söderberg-Nauclér, one of the most vocal critics, who was quoted accusing the government of "leading us to catastrophe" and having "decided to let people die".

In a 2023 retrospective, The New York Times noted that Sweden "had a remarkably average pandemic.", concluding that "Sweden never exactly let it rip, nor did the country truly expose its population to uninterrupted spread. Instead, it asked its citizens to protect themselves, according to a suite of best practices familiar to anyone who's lived through the last three years with open eyes. And then to vaccinate like crazy. The result wasn't painless; the country didn't beat or even emerge unscathed from the pandemic. But it did survive it. Like much of the rest of the world.

=== Debate and criticism ===
The Swedish response to the pandemic has been debated within Sweden, though surveys show a wide agreement for the response among the public. The debate has mostly involved academics, as the opposition in the Riksdag initially mostly avoided criticising the response from the government or the agencies. The parties without representation in the government, including the liberal conservative party, the Moderates, the Christian Democrats, the centre-right parties the Liberals and the Centre Party, and the socialist Left Party instead voiced their support for the government consisting of the Swedish Social Democratic Party and the Green Party, in what often is referred to as a 'borgfred' (truce) where the opposition support the government in a time of crisis. The exception was the right-wing populist Sweden Democrats, whose party leader Jimmie Åkesson called for school closings. The leader of the Moderate Party, the biggest party in opposition, Ulf Kristersson, said that eventually it will be needed to evaluate how the government and agencies have handled the pandemic, "but not now". In May, several opposition politicians sharply criticised the government and Prime Minister Stefan Löfvén for the low number of tests being carried out, despite promises from the Government in April to increase testing to 100,000 individuals a week. Kristersson demanded for Löfvén to be much more clear about who has the responsibility for the testing, and Ebba Busch, leader of the Christian Democrats, accused Löfvén of "weak rulership" playing a "high risk game with the lives and health of Swedes". Left Party leader Jonas Sjöstedt said that the government needed to step in and take charge, and accused the government of having remained powerless when the regions failed to increase testing.

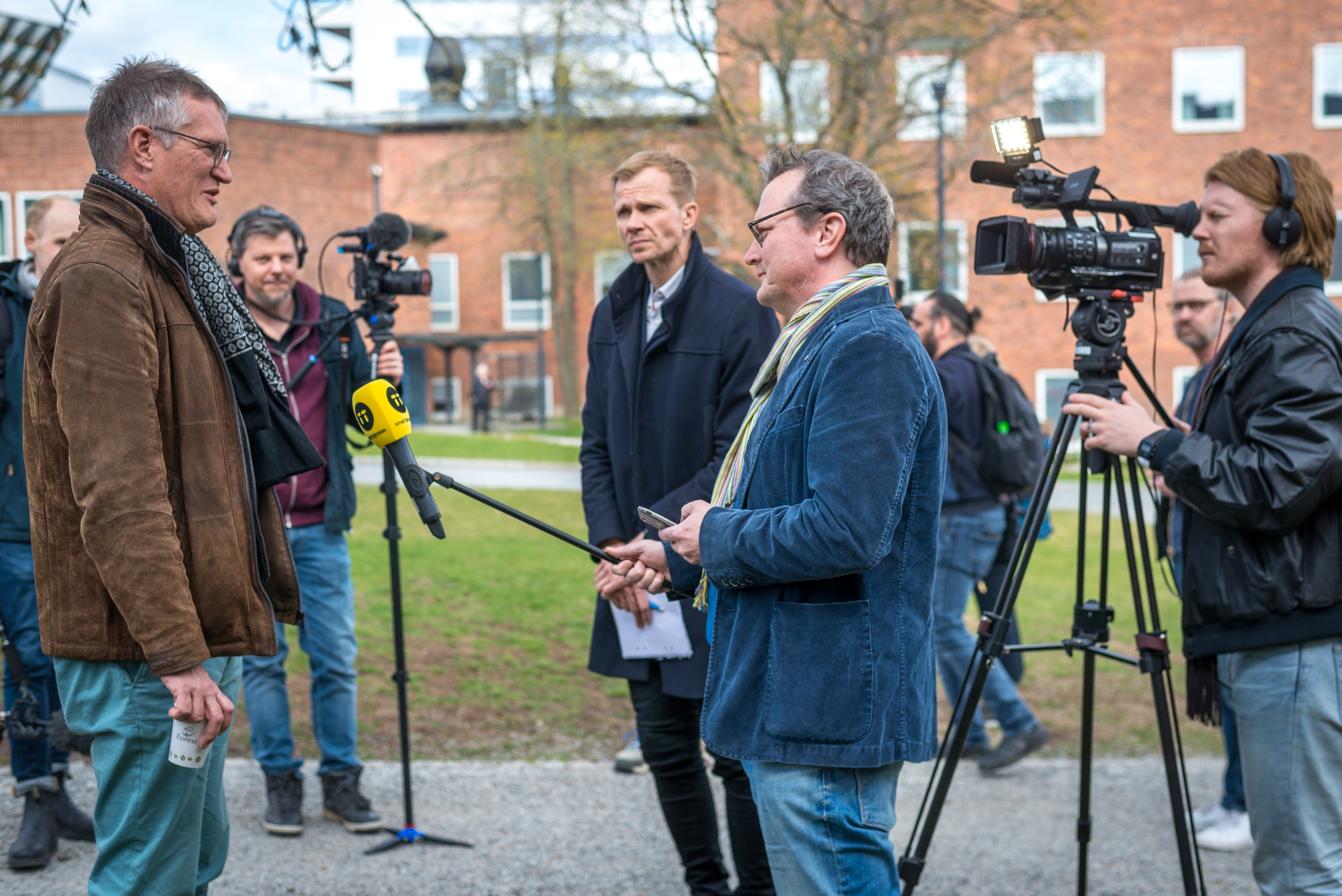
Anders Tegnell being interviewed during his daily coronavirus briefing in April 2020

On 14 April 2020, a debate article was sent to Swedish newspapers signed by 22 Swedish researchers, saying that the strategy of the Swedish public health agency would lead to "chaos in the healthcare system". Moreover, they said that there was no transparency regarding the data used in the models made by the agency. Anders Tegnell from the public health agency responded to the criticism by saying that there was no lack in transparency in the agency's work and that all data is available to be downloaded by the public as an excel-file on their website. Additionally, Tegnell stated that the numbers of deaths presented in the published article are wrong, especially regarding the specific number of deaths per day (this data was later re-confirmed by the 22 researchers and the information added to the original article in DN). Another claim in the article saying that Sweden's statistics were closing in to the ones of Italy was countered by Anders Tegnell saying that unlike Sweden, Italy and many other countries only report on deaths in hospitals, making it hard to compare the numbers of the different countries. He also said in an interview with the BBC that Sweden's strategy is largely working in slowing the spread of the disease; although the death toll in nursing homes was high, the country's healthcare system did not become overwhelmed, and that Sweden's approach had made it better-placed than other countries in dealing with a second wave of infections.

Sweden questioned the scientific basis for imposing mandatory lockdown seen in other European countries, relying instead on the civic responsibility of its citizens to keep large parts of its society open. Although senior high schools were closed and gatherings of more than 50 people were banned, shops, restaurants and junior schools remained open. Swedes were expected to follow the recommendations on social distancing, avoiding non-essential travel, remote work, and staying indoors if they are elderly or feeling ill.

Sweden's response to the pandemic was sometimes used both to defend and to criticise more "strict" measures, including anti-lockdown protesters and politicians. Some foreign leaders have used Sweden as a warning example when defending their own strategy, including Alberto Fernández, President of Argentina, and US president Donald Trump who compared Sweden's higher death toll next to its neighbouring countries who had applied stricter measures, and said that "Sweden is paying heavily for its decision not to lockdown". Some of the harshest criticism from outside Sweden was found in the Chinese tabloid Global Times, owned by the ruling Chinese Communist Party; it accused Sweden of having capitulated to the virus, calling the country 'a black hole' and called for the international community to condemn Sweden's actions. Some, including Swedish Minister for Justice Morgan Johansson, speculated that the strong criticism may be partly linked to the poor relations between the two countries after China's imprisonment of the Swedish book publisher Gui Minhai.

Yngve Gustafson, a professor of geriatrics at the University of Umeå, has alleged that some elderly COVID-19 patients in Swedish hospitals and nursing homes who could have survived with more active treatment were instead prematurely referred to palliative or hospice care, and that this has resulted in unnecessary deaths. Politicians and health care workers in Sweden have also debated whether elder care homes have been too reluctant to transfer older patients to higher levels of care for fear of overwhelming the hospital system, and whether restrictions on scope of practice should have been relaxed to allow more patients in care homes to receive oxygen therapy without being transferred to hospital.

During an interview with SVT in December 2020, King Carl XVI Gustaf described the Swedish response to the pandemic as having "failed" to save lives.

A March 2022 review published in Humanities and Social Sciences Communications criticized the government's response, saying that it led to more deaths from COVID-19 in Sweden than in its neighbouring Nordic countries.

=== Public opinion ===
According to surveys carried out in late March and early April 2020, three out of four Swedes (71–76%) trusted the Public Health Agency, and nearly half of the people surveyed (47%) said they had 'very high trust' in the agency. A majority said they trusted the government, and 85% said they trusted the Swedish health-care system. A March 2020 survey reported that more than half (53%) of the Swedish population had trust in the state epidemiologist, Anders Tegnell, a higher share than for any of the current leaders of the Swedish political parties. The share of respondents who said that they didn't trust Tegnell was 18%. In an April survey carried out by DN/Ipsos, the share who said they trusted Tegnell had increased to 69%, while the number who said they didn't trust their state epidemiologist had decreased to 11%.

In June 2020, the same research institute Novus reported a decrease in trust for the government's response from 63% in April to 45% in June with lower support also for the Public Health Agency to 65%.

== See also ==
- Operation Gloria
- Coronakommissionen
