= Annika Linde =

Swedish physician, virologist

State Epidemiologist of the Public Health Agency of Sweden
- In office 2005–2013
- Deputy: Anders Wallensten
- Preceded by: Johan Giesecke
- Succeeded by: Anders Tegnell

Personal details
- Born: Gerda Annika Linde; 26 February 1948 (age 78) Skövde, Västra Götaland, Sweden
- Education: University of Gothenburg
- Profession: Physician, Epidemiologist, Virologist

Gerda Annika Linde (born 26 February 1948) is a Swedish physician, virologist and retired civil servant. From 2005 to 2013, she served as State Epidemiologist at the Swedish Institute for Communicable Disease Control.

== Biography ==
Linde was born in Skövde and grew up there. She was inspired by the novel Exodus by Leon Uris to study medicine. She enrolled at University of Gothenburg in 1968, studying medicine and sociology, obtaining a medical degree in 1974. After her internship at Danderyd Hospital she went on to work as an infectious disease specialist at the presently defunct Roslagstull Hospital in Stockholm. In 1979, she started working at the virological department at the Swedish National Bacteriological Laboratory, and completed her PhD in Clinical Virology in 1987. In 1993, she became head of the Swedish influenza centre of the WHO and started working for Department of Virology at the Swedish Institute for Communicable Disease Control, where she in 2002 became department head. In 2005, she became head of the Department of Epidemiology and was in the same year appointed State Epidemiologist. She served in this role until her retirement in 2013, when she was succeeded by Anders Tegnell.

Linde's research is mainly focused on adapting basic research results to clinical applications. She has researched the reaction of the human body to different types of viruses and evaluation of diagnostic methods. She mainly focused on herpes viruses to begin with, but eventually came to focus her work mostly on influenza and respiratory viruses. She has published more than 200 peer-reviewed scientific papers.

Linde has served as adjunct professor at the Karolinska Institute. She hosted an episode of the popular radio show Sommar i P1 for Sveriges Radio in 2010.
