= Nauclér =

Nauclér is a surname. Notable people with the surname include:

- Cecilia Söderberg-Nauclér (born 1967), Swedish immunologist
- Elisabeth Nauclér (born 1952), Swedish-born Finnish politician and jurist
- Sten-Eggert Nauclér (1914–1990), Swedish Army officer
