= Military operations other than war =

Use of armed forces to suppress civilian conflict and create domestic tranquility

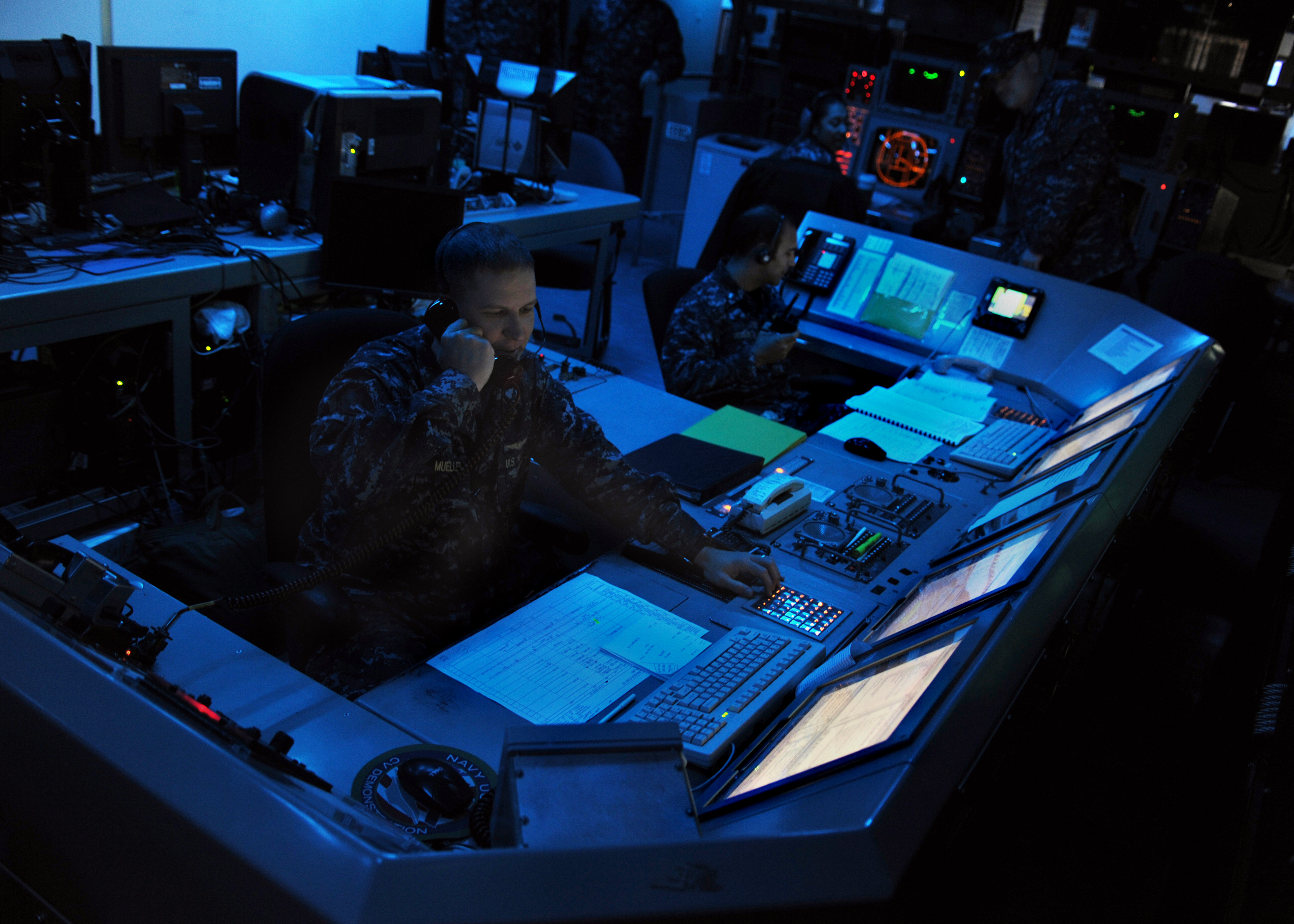
US Navy officers aboard the aircraft carrier USS Abraham Lincoln (CVN-72) monitoring defense systems during maritime security operations.

Military operations other than war (MOOTW) are military operations that do not involve warfare, combat, or the threat or use of violence. They generally include peacekeeping, peacebuilding, disaster response, humanitarian aid, military engineering, law enforcement, arms control, deterrence, and multilateralism.

The phrase and acronym were coined by the United States Armed Forces in the 1990s, but it has since fallen out of use. The British Armed Forces use an alternative term called peace support operations (PSO), which essentially refers to the same thing as MOOTW. Similarly, the Chinese People's Liberation Army also uses a similar concept called non-war military activities, which expands on MOOTW and includes a range of activities categorized as "Confrontational" ,"Law Enforcement", "Aid & Rescue", or "Cooperative".

Special agreements exist which facilitate fire support operations within NATO and the ABCANZ quadripartite working group. Cooperation is organized in advance with NATO standardization agreements (STANAGs) and quadripartite standardization agreements (QSTAGs). Many countries which need disaster support relief have no bilateral agreements already in place, and action may be required, based on the situation, to establish such agreements.

The United Nations (UN) recognizes the vulnerability of civilians in armed conflict. United Nations Security Council resolution 1674 (2006) on the protection of civilians in armed conflict enhances international focused attention on the protection of civilians in UN and other peace operations. The implementation of paragraph 16 anticipates that peacekeeping missions are provided with clear guidelines regarding what missions can and should do to achieve protection goals; that the protection of civilians is given priority in decisions about the use of resources; and that protection mandates are implemented.

== Overview ==
MOOTW purposes may include deterring potential aggressors, protecting national interests, and supporting UN objectives.

Peacetime and conflict represent two states of the range of military operations.

- Peacetime is a state in which diplomatic, economic, informational, and military powers are employed in combination with each other to achieve national objectives.
- Conflict is a unique environment in which the military works closely with diplomatic leaders to control hostilities; and the national objective is focused on the goal of returning to peacetime conditions.

Planners are challenged to find ways to resolve or work around unique arrays of inter-related constraints (e.g. issues related to budgeting, training, and force structure). The uncertainties which are inherent or implied include the varying political aspects which are likely to affect unanticipated MOOTW.

== Australia ==
The Australian Defence Force has turned attention to the study and understanding of a changing geo-strategic environment. MOOTW becomes more important where the options for traditional application of military instruments are growing more limited.

Australian participation in UN peacekeeping operations began in 1947.

=== Select Australian deployments ===
- 1947 UN Consular Commission to Indonesia
- 2005 Nias–Simeulue earthquake ("Operation Sumatra Assist"): Emergency relief and medical assistance.

Current Australian deployments include the UN Assistance Mission in Afghanistan (UNAMA); the UN Assistance Mission for Iraq (UNAMI); the UN Peacekeeping Force in Cyprus (UNFICYP); the UN Truce Supervision Organization (UNTSO); the UN Integrated Mission in Timor-Leste (UNMIT); the UN Mission in the Sudan (UNMIS); and the UN–African Union Mission in Darfur (UNAMID).

== Canada ==
The curriculum of the Canadian Armed Forces's training programs includes MOOTW. In the 20th century Canadian peacekeeping was well publicised in Canada.

=== Select Canadian deployments ===
- Cyprus, 1960s
- Congo, 1960s
- Afghanistan, 2001–2014

== China ==
The non-traditional missions of the People's Liberation Army have evolved as an increasingly used tool of statecraft.

The People's Liberation Army (PLA) established specialized forces for military operations other than war. In the 2013 Science of Military Strategy, PLA writers articulated a Non-War Military Activities (NWMA) concept based on MOOTW which emphasizes "Confrontational," "Law Enforcement," "Aid & Rescue," and "Cooperative" military activities as a source of military strength alongside traditional deterrence and warfighting.

=== Select Chinese deployments ===
- Somali pirates, 2009: Naval escort missions in waters off Somalia.

== Indonesia ==
The military in Indonesia has evolved as an apparatus for defence based on political decisions.

The Indonesian National Armed Forces are tasked with military operations other than war, which include deterring radicalism and terrorism, securing critical infrastructure such as border controls, protecting dignitaries, providing disaster relief, and assisting the government in securing flight and maritime routes against hijacking, piracy, and trafficking.

=== Select Indonesian deployments ===
- Garuda Contingent, 1956–Present.

== Japan ==
The Japan Self-Defense Forces are affected by the Constitution of Japan, Article 9 of which prohibits the use of war to resolve the country's disputes. This affects their operations, as well as the classifications of some equipment such as the Hyūga-class helicopter destroyer, which are limited to the role of MOOTW.

=== Select Japanese deployments ===
- Iraq War ("Operation Enduring Freedom"), 2003–2009: Ground Self-Defense Forces, water purification near Basra; Air Self-Defence Forces, cargo and personnel transport; Maritime Self-Defence Forces, supply ships servicing the international flotilla.

== United Kingdom ==
The prescience of Sir Julian Corbett (1854–1922) and his strategic point of view are reflected in contemporary applications of MOOTW, which extend and reinvigorate Corbettian formulations.

The evolution of British tactics in the Malayan Emergency (1948–1960) illustrates lessons learned the hard way. The British developed a strategy with elements similar to MOOTW. Lieutenant General Sir Harold Briggs proposed "two key goals to accomplish in order to end the insurgency—first, to protect the population, and second to isolate them from the guerrillas."

British peacekeeping troops in Bosnia in the late 1990s attended to similar objectives in a process of re-establishing "normalcy."

=== Selected British deployments ===
- 1995 post-Bosnian War ("Operation Deliberate Force").

== United States ==
In United States military doctrine, military operations other than war include the use of military capabilities across a range of operations that fall short of war. Because of political considerations, MOOTW operations normally have more restrictive rules of engagement (ROE) than in war.

Although the MOOTW acronym is new, the concepts are not. The RAND database identifies 846 military operations other than war between 1916 and 1996 in which the US Air Force or its predecessors played a noteworthy role.

=== Select American deployments ===
- 2005 Nias–Simeulue earthquake: Emergency relief and medical assistance.
- 1990–1994 Operation Promote Liberty: Occupation and peacekeeping mission in Panama after the 1989 United States invasion of Panama.
- 1991 Operation Eastern Exit: Noncombatant evacuation operation to evacuate diplomatic staff and civilians, from the US and 29 other countries, from the US Embassy in Mogadishu, Somalia as the city plunged into near-anarchy during the Somali Civil War.
- 2001–2014 Operation Enduring Freedom: Bush Doctrine continuous operation across numerous countries, mainly Afghanistan, Pakistan, Kyrgyzstan and Uzbekistan.
- 2011 military intervention in Libya: UN-authorized no-fly zone enforcement in defence of rebel factions in Libya.

== Singapore ==
The Singapore Armed Forces (SAF) anticipates a continuing need for conventional military competence into the foreseeable future, but missions in which the use of minimal force is the rule rather than the exception are expected to grow in importance. Proficiency in MOOTW requires a much greater and somewhat different set of skill sets than traditional war-fighting. In this context, the SAF is developing new training programmes for small unit leaders. The process of educating and preparing a professional SAF capable of handling a wide spectrum of operations anticipates an increase in MOOTW. These men will need to ready to become "peacekeepers, goodwill ambassadors and winners of hearts and minds."

In 1999, the Singapore contingent of UN peacekeepers in East Timor was the most extensive MOOTW mission attempted by the SAF. The commitment included three landing ship tanks (LSTs), medical teams, C-130s, military observers and logistics support.

=== Select Singapore deployments ===
- United Nations Transitional Administration in East Timor, 1999–2002. Peacekeeping, medical assistance, logistical support.
- 2004 Indian Ocean Earthquake and Tsunami, Aceh Province, Sumatra, Indonesia ("Operation Flying Eagle" or OFE): Emergency relief, medical assistance and temporary relocation of victims.

== Sweden ==
=== Select Swedish deployments ===
- Swedish Armed Forces conducted supporting operations during the forest fires of 2014 and 2018.
- Operation Gloria, 2020–2023. Supporting Swedish civil authorities during the COVID-19 pandemic in Sweden.

== India ==
The Indian Army is tasked with many operations other than war such as Operation Sadbhavana (Goodwill) in Jammu and Kashmir and Operation Samaritan in north-east India. Operation Sadbhavana aims to limit the alienation faced by the population and infrastructure destruction in Jammu and Kashmir in areas where the government administration has not been successful due to insurgency. Welfare initiatives include Army Goodwill Schools, educational and motivational tours, health camps, women and youth empowerment and infrastructure development.

The Indian defence forces also takes part in various UN Peacekeeping missions.

== See also ==
- Counter-insurgency
- Fourth-generation warfare
- Low intensity conflict
- Grey-zone (international relations)
