= Johan Giesecke =

Swedish epidemiologist

- Born: 9 September 1949 (age 76); Stockholm
- Education: London School of Hygiene and Tropical Medicine; Karolinska Institute
- Scientific career
- Workplaces: Karolinska Institute; European Centre for Disease Prevention and Control
- Thesis: [1979 On The Molecular Structure Of Dopaminergic Substances]

Johan Giesecke (born 9 September 1949) is a Swedish physician and Professor Emeritus at the Karolinska Institute in Stockholm.

Giesecke was born in Stockholm. He defended his thesis, On The Molecular Structure Of Dopaminergic Substances, at the Karolinska Institute. He trained as an infectious disease clinician and worked with AIDS patients during the 1980s. Giesecke received an MSc in epidemiology from the London School of Hygiene and Tropical Medicine in 1992, after which he worked as a Senior Lecturer at the school.

From 1995 to 2005, Giesecke served as state epidemiologist of Sweden. During a one-year sabbatical 1999-2000 he led a group at the World Health Organization working on the revision of the International Health Regulations. After this, he was Chief Scientist at the European Centre for Disease Prevention and Control from 2005 to 2014. Since 2019 and as of 2022, Giesecke is a member of the Strategic and Technical Advisory Group for Infectious Hazards of the World Health Organization. He worked as an advisor to the Public Health Agency of Sweden during the COVID-19 pandemic in Sweden.

== Publications ==
=== English ===
- On The Molecular Structure Of Dopaminergic Substances (Balder, 1979)
- Modern Infectious Disease Epidemiology (Edward Arnold, 1994)

=== Swedish ===
- Att förebygga HIV: Psykosocialt omhändertagande vid kontaktspårning (Studentlitteratur, 1991)
