= Magnus Gisslén =

6th Chief Epidemiologist of the Public Health Agency of Sweden
- Incumbent
- Assumed office 11 September 2023
- Preceded by: Anders Lindblom
- Succeeded by: Erik Sturegård (acting)

Personal details
- Born: 25 December 1962 (age 63) Kortedala Parish, Gothenburg, Sweden
- Spouse: Helena Gisslén

Magnus Per Gisslén (born 25 December 1962) is a Swedish professor and was until 18 August 2025 State Epidemiologist.

== Biography ==
In 1996, he defended his thesis on the diagnosis and treatment of HIV. He has administered HIV healthcare in Gothenburg for several years, and was put in charge of the COVID-19 healthcare branch following the outbreak in Sweden.

His main area of research is the HIV virus and its effects on the human brain and central nervous system as a virus reservoir. During the COVID-19 pandemic, he participated in establishing a biobank with samples from COVID-19 patients and published many research papers on the subject.

Gisslén is a former chief physician of Sahlgrenska University Hospital's Department of Infectious Diseases and professor of infectious diseases at the University of Gothenburg's Sahlgrenska Academy. In a press release, it was announced that Gisslén would be appointed chief epidemiologist.

On Google Scholar, he has over 14,800 citations and an h-index of 60.

Medical appointments
Preceded by Anders Lindblom as acting	Chief Epidemiologist of the Public Health Agency of Sweden; 2023–present	Incumbent
