= State epidemiologist (Sweden) =

State epidemiologist of the Public Health Agency of Sweden
- Statsepidemiolog
- Sweden
- Incumbent; Magnus Gisslén since 2023
- Department of Public Health Analysis and Data Management
- Reports to: Karin Tegmark Wisell (director general)
- Seat: Solna, Stockholm County
- Precursor: Anders Lindblom
- Formation: 1955
- First holder: Bo Zetterberg
- Succession: Seventh
- Deputy: Anders Wallensten

The state epidemiologist, or the chief epidemiologist (plural: state epidemiologists or chief epidemiologists, Swedish: statsepidemiolog) is a Swedish civil servant. The current state epidemiologist is Anders Lindblom, with Anders Wallensten as deputy state epidemiologist.

Initially, the state epidemiologist was the head of the epidemiology department at the State Bacteriological Laboratory at the time of its establishment in 1955. In 1993, the post was transferred to the newly founded agency Institute for Communicable Disease Control. After the Institute was merged with Swedish National Institute of Public Health in 2014, the post became part of the new agency, the Public Health Agency of Sweden.

== List of Swedish state epidemiologists ==
- 1956–1976: Bo Zetterberg
- 1976–1993: Margareta Böttiger
- 1995–2005: Johan Giesecke
- 2005–2013: Annika Linde
- 2013–2022: Anders Tegnell
- 2022–2023: Anders Lindblom
- 2023–2025: Magnus Gisslén
- 2025–present: Erik Sturegård (acting)

== See also ==
- Healthcare in Sweden
- COVID-19 pandemic in Sweden
