= Coronakommissionen =

Swedish independent commission

The Coronavirus Commission (Swedish: Coronakommissionen) is a Swedish independent commission to evaluate the government's response to the COVID-19 pandemic in Sweden. Formed of a panel of 8 experts, the commission was established by the Government of Sweden in 2020 following pressure from the Riksdag.

In December 2020, a report by the commission criticised the government for failing to protect elderly people in aged care due to the high level of community spread. In October 2021, the commission's second report characterised the government's response in early 2020 as "insufficient" and "late".

The commission said in their final report in February 2022 that the government's strategy of not introducing lockdowns, as many other countries had done, was "fundamentally correct" for maintaining individuals' personal freedoms over those in other countries, but was critical of the decisions not to introduce "more rigorous and intrusive disease prevention and control measures" in February and March 2020. It also said that the government had delegated too much responsibility to the Public Health Agency of Sweden and the responsible bodies for decision making were not always clear.
