= Vetenskapsforum COVID-19 =

Group of Swedish scientists critical of government COVID-19 policies

The Vetenskapsforum COVID-19 (English: "COVID-19 Science Forum") is a self organized group of 40 Swedish scientists and medical professionals. It has been active in Swedish and foreign media, criticizing the Swedish government's approach to controlling the COVID-19 pandemic in Sweden, from the position that the measures were not strict enough.

Prominent members of the group include the film director and former physician Lena Einhorn and Andrew Ewing, a professor of molecular biology and chemistry and member of the Royal Swedish Academy of Sciences.

Ewing received hate mail after making criticisms of the government's policies.

== See also ==
- Coronakommissionen
