= Operation Gloria =

Swedish military support operation during the COVID-19 outbreak in Sweden

- Part of COVID-19 pandemic in Sweden
- Operational scope: Operational, Supporting, Military operations other than war
- Type: Military operations other than war
- Location: Sweden
- Commanded by: Commander Fredrik Utterström
- Target: Supporting Swedish civil agencies in handling the COVID-19 pandemic in Sweden.
- Date: 11 March 2020 – 31 January 2023
- Executed by: Swedish Armed Forces: Home Guard; Northern Military Region; Central Military Region; Gotland Military Region (Militärregion Gotland, MR G); Western Military Region; Southern Military Region; National CBRN Defence Centre; Gotland Regiment; Swedish Armed Forces Helicopter Wing; Skaraborg Wing; Swedish Armed Forces Centre for Defence Medicine

Operation Gloria was a Swedish military operation conducted in support of handling the COVID-19 pandemic in Sweden.

== Background ==
Sweden's first case of COVID-19 was discovered in January 2020. The 11th of March, the Swedish Public Health Agency (Folkhälsomyndigheten) asked the Swedish Armed Forces for support in handling the outbreak.

The Swedish Armed Forces was first tasked with supporting the civilian society in case of peace time emergencies in 1995 by the then current Swedish government. The task was abolished in 2004, but was later added again in 2009.

== Swedish military support in handling the Covid-19 outbreak ==
=== Field hospitals ===
The Swedish Armed Forces set up two field hospitals; one in the capital city of Stockholm, and one in Gothenburg, on the west coast. Originally, the armed forces was preparing to set up a field hospital at Ärna Air Base in Uppsala, north of Stockholm. The resources were instead rerouted to Älvsjö mess hall, in southern Stockholm. The hospital was prepared to admit 550 ICU patients, but was demobilised in June 2020, without taking in one single patient. This was due to the hospital in the Stockholm area had contingency preparedness and was able to handle the situation by themselves.

=== Staff support ===
The armed forces also sent staff officers and civilian personnel to support Swedish National Board of Health and Welfare (Socialstyrelsen), Swedish Agency for Economic and Regional Growth (Tillväxtverket), and several county administrative boards (Länsstyrelser).

The Swedish Prince Carl Philip, Duke of Värmland, asked, and served in the Swedish Armed Forces high command to support the operational staff leading the support operation. He served with the rank of major at the time.

=== Transport resources ===
The armed forces provided transport capacity to several civilian agencies in the form of ambulances and airlift capabilities in the form of helicopters - NHIndustries NH90 - and aircraft - C-130 Hercules.

=== Equipment ===
The armed forces provided the civilian agencies with 50.000 gas masks and 40.000 chemical weapons protection gear. It also supported with medical technologies equipment, EKG equipment, and X-rays.

=== Contact tracing ===
The largest part of Operation Gloria was military personnel helping out with gathering and deliveries of contact tracing tests. Military personnel, mainly from the Home Guard (Hemvärnet) - but also conscripts and professional soldiers - delivered and gathered individual self tests from sick individuals and delivered these to test labs for control, contact tracing, and anti-bodies.

=== Vaccinations ===
The Swedish Armed Forces were asked to relieve the civilian medical organisations by vaccinating their own personnel, mainly in the regions of Blekinge, Halland, and Västra Götaland County.

After some debate, Swedish military personnel taking part in international military missions - such as MINUSMA - were allowed to be vaccinated ahead of time.

=== Laboratory ===
The National CBRN Defence Centre (Totalförsvarets skyddscentrum, SkyddsC) in Umeå conducted an exercise together with Uppsala University Hospital (Akademiska sjukhuset) and the Public Health Agency to maintain readiness and Freedom of Action to sampling and analyzing possible contagion. The exercise showed a positive outcome. This resource was however never activated.
