= Anders Wallensten =

Swedish physician and epidemiologist

Deputy State Epidemiologist of the Public Health Agency of Sweden

Personal details
- Born: Anders Theodor Wallensten; 22 January 1974 (age 52) Östermalm, Stockholm, Sweden
- Parents: Richard Wallensten (father); Kerstin Uvnäs Moberg (mother)
- Education: Uppsala University
- Profession: Physician, epidemiologist, civil servant

Anders Theodor Wallensten (born 22 January 1974 in Stockholm) is a Swedish physician and epidemiologist. He is the son of Richard Wallensten and Kerstin Uvnäs Moberg, both physicians.

He obtained his medical degree at Uppsala University in 2000, and later obtained his PhD at Linköping University in 2006 for a thesis on the Influenza A virus among wild birds. He currently serves as the Swedish deputy state epidemiologist, under state epidemiologist Anders Tegnell.
