= Cecilia Söderberg-Nauclér =

Swedish immunologist

- Born: 1967 (age 58–59)
- Education: Karolinska Institute (MD)
- Scientific career
- Workplaces: Karolinska Institute
- Thesis: (1995)

Cecilia Söderberg-Nauclér, born 1967, is a Swedish immunologist who is Professor of Microbial Pathogenesis at the Karolinska Institute. In 2013, she demonstrated that a simple antiviral could improve the life expectancy of glioblastoma disease. During the COVID-19 pandemic in Sweden, Söderberg-Nauclér on several occasions strongly criticized the Swedish response to SARS-CoV-2, claiming that they were leading the country into a catastrophe, and demanded that the Swedish state epidemiologist should resign.

== Early life and education ==
Her early research considered the immunogenicity of human aminopeptidase in cytomegalovirus disease. Her medical career began at the Karolinska University Hospital, where she joined the Centre for Molecular Medicine in 2001.

== Research and career ==
Söderberg-Nauclér has held a Chair in Molecular Immunology at the Karolinska Institute since 2014. Her research considers human cytomegaloviruses (CMV), a family of viruses that infect between 70 and 100% of the population. In healthy patients, CMV causes no symptoms, whilst in immunosuppressed patients it can cause severe disease. Söderberg-Nauclér studies CMV in high risk patients and has developed the sensitivity of CMV detection techniques. She has studied the role of CMV in inflammatory disease and cancer. Söderberg-Nauclér identified that the majority of patients with rheumatism have an active CMV infection.

She showed that one of CMV's chemokine receptors, US28, induces a smooth muscle migration that permits the development of diseases. CMV then induces the production of leukotriene B4 in smooth muscle cells, which controls the function of matrix metallopeptidase (MMPs) in macrophages. Söderberg-Nauclér identified that CMV itself is active in different forms of cancer, including glioblastoma. She compared the presence of CMV in the body tissue patients with and without glioblastoma, and showed that the virus infected 90 % of patients with glioblastoma. In 2013, she identified that by treating the CMV, through an antiviral used as a supplement to oncological therapies, could extend the survival time of glioblastoma patients. She showed that the simple antiviral treatment Valganciclovir could extend the life expectancy of glioblastoma patients by forty months. She is leading a double-blind clinical trial to evaluate the efficacy of valganciclovir, an anti-CMV drug, in the treatment of patients with glioblastoma. She has also shown that anemia can be exacerbated or induced in patients with kidney disease who have CMV.

Söderberg-Nauclér criticised the response of the Swedish government to the COVID-19 pandemic in Sweden, accusing them of "leading us to catastrophe", and demanded that the Swedish chief epidemiologist should resign. While many other countries implemented some form of lockdown, Sweden implemented less restrictive measures, and Söderberg-Nauclér argued that they should be more strict, and impose a lockdown in Stockholm. In an interview with The Guardian, Söderberg-Nauclér accused the Swedish government of "thinking they can’t stop it, so they’ve decided to let people die”. Söderberg-Nauclér has in turn received criticism herself, for using inaccurate data and erroneous claims in her attacks on the Swedish authorities, including a controversial opinion piece signed by Söderberg-Nauclér along with 21 others. They later acknowledged this, but responded "as we see it, the cited numbers are less important". Söderberg-Nauclér also received criticism for sharing content criticizing the Swedish authorities from Russian state broadcaster RT.

== Selected publications ==
- Hansson, Göran K.; Robertson, Anna-Karin L.; Söderberg-Nauclér, Cecilia (2006-01-24). "Inflammation and atherosclerosis". Annual Review of Pathology: Mechanisms of Disease. 1 (1): 297–329. doi:10.1146/annurev.pathol.1.110304.100100. ISSN 1553-4006. PMID 18039117.
- Söderberg-Nauclér, Cecilia; Fish, Kenneth N.; Nelson, Jay A. (1997-10-03). "Reactivation of Latent Human Cytomegalovirus by Allogeneic Stimulation of Blood Cells from Healthy Donors". Cell. 91 (1): 119–126. doi:10.1016/S0092-8674(01)80014-3. ISSN 0092-8674. PMID 9335340. S2CID 11028979.
- Soderberg-Naucler, C.; Streblow, D. N.; Fish, K. N.; Allan-Yorke, J.; Smith, P. P.; Nelson, J. A. (2001-08-15). "Reactivation of Latent Human Cytomegalovirus in CD14+ Monocytes Is Differentiation Dependent". Journal of Virology. 75 (16): 7543–7554. doi:10.1128/jvi.75.16.7543-7554.2001. ISSN 0022-538X. PMC 114989. PMID 11462026.
