= Public Health Agency of Sweden =

Government agency of Sweden

- Folkhälsomyndigheten
- Logotype of the Public Health Agency of Sweden

Agency overview
- Formed: 2014
- Preceding agencies: Swedish National Institute of Public Health; Swedish Institute for Communicable Disease Control
- Headquarters: Solna
- Employees: 450
- Annual budget: SEK 354 million (2014)
- Minister responsible: Jakob Forssmed, Minister for Social Affairs and Public Health
- Agency executive: Karin Tegmark Wisell, Director-General
- Parent agency: Ministry of Health and Social Affairs
- Key documents: Regleringsbrev; Instruktion
- Website: folkhalsomyndigheten.se

The Public Health Agency of Sweden (Swedish: Folkhälsomyndigheten, FHM) is a Swedish government agency with national responsibility for public health. It falls under the Ministry of Health and Social Affairs and works to promote public health and to prevent illness and injuries through education. It monitors the health of the population, infectious disease control measures, and public health interventions, and assists the Government in its decision-making process by providing facts and knowledge. The agency is tasked with minimizing negative environmental impact on human health, and participates in the work of the EU and international public health organisations, such as the WHO and IANPHI.

== History ==
The agency was established in 2014 by a merger of the Swedish National Institute of Public Health (Folkhälsoinstitutet) and the Swedish Institute for Infectious Disease Control (Smittskyddsinstitutet). It took on most of the responsibilities for environmental health and for environment and public health reports previously assigned to the National Board of Health and Welfare.

== Organisation ==
The agency has about 450 employees and is based in Solna. It is led by Director-General Johan Carlson, and organized into five departments: Epidemiology and Evaluation, Knowledge support, Microbiology, Communications and Administration. In mid-2025, the outgoing state epidemiologist publicly criticized the agency for being crippled by office politics and for having no medical expertise in the leadership.

== High-containment laboratory ==
The Public Health Agency of Sweden runs the only biosafety level 4 laboratory in the Nordic region — one of only six in Europe. The laboratory is located at the headquarters in Solna, and has been in operation since 2001. It is built of wholly encased steel, totally isolated from the rest of the premises. The entire building is kept at negative air pressure, to prevent any contagion spreading outdoors, and laboratory access is limited to approximately 20 employees, pre-screened by the Swedish Security Service. Patients with highly infectious diseases are usually treated at high-containment medical facilities in Linköping University Hospital or at Karolinska University Hospital.

== See also ==
- List of national public health agencies.
