= Results of the 1956 Swedish general election =

Sweden held a general election on 16 September 1956. This was the sole election between WWII and 1976 which rendered a centre-right majority in the chamber, although the bicameral system and the majority for the leftist parties in the upper chamber rendered a cross-coalition Social Democrat-Farmers' League government.

== Results ==
Party	Votes	%	Seats	+/–
Swedish Social Democratic Party	1,729,463	44.58	106	–4
People's Party	923,564	23.81	58	0
Right Party	663,693	17.11	42	+11
Farmers' League	366,612	9.45	19	–7
Communist Party	194,016	5.00	6	+1
Left Socialist Party	1,252	0.03	0	0
Samlingspartiet	635	0.02	0	New
Other parties	95	0.00	0	0
Total	3,879,330	100.00	231	+1
Valid votes	3,879,330	99.42		
Invalid/blank votes	22,784	0.58		
Total votes	3,902,114	100.00		
Registered voters/turnout	4,887,325	79.84		
Source: Nohlen & Stöver, SCB

== Regional results ==
=== Percentage share ===
Location	Share	Votes	S	FP	H	B	K	Other	Left	Right
Götaland	48.9	1,895,577	42.4	23.0	19.2	11.7	3.7	0.2	46.0	53.9
Svealand	35.7	1,386,402	45.2	27.0	16.4	5.8	5.5	0.0	50.7	49.3
Norrland	15.4	597,351	50.1	18.9	12.1	10.8	8.1	0.0	58.2	41.8
Total	100.0	3,879,330	44.6	23.8	17.1	9.5	5.0	0.1	49.6	50.4
Source:SCB

=== By votes ===
Location	Share	Votes	S	FP	H	B	K	Other	Left	Right
Götaland	48.9	1,895,577	803,151	435,945	363,392	221,593	69,559	1,937	872,710	1,020,930
Svealand	35.7	1,386,402	626,989	374,839	227,787	80,505	76,260	22	703,249	683,131
Norrland	15.4	597,351	299,323	112,780	72,514	64,514	48,197	23	347,520	249,808
Total	100.0	3,879,330	1,729,463	923,564	663,693	366,612	194,016	1,982	1,923,479	1,953,869
Source:SCB

== Constituency results ==
=== Percentage share ===
Location	Land	Turnout	Share	Votes	S	FP	H	B	K	Other	Left	Right	Margin
Location		%	%		%	%	%	%	%	%	%	%	
Blekinge	G	78.4	2.0	75,997	46.7	25.4	15.1	8.9	3.9	0.0	50.6	49.4	941
Bohuslän	G	76.8	2.8	106,899	40.1	31.4	14.8	10.1	3.6	0.0	43.7	56.3	13,433
Gothenburg	G	80.1	5.4	210,607	35.3	41.1	11.9	0.1	11.0	0.6	46.4	53.0	14,095
Gotland	G	81.4	0.8	29,738	35.3	21.3	16.5	26.2	0.7	0.0	36.0	64.0	8,304
Gävleborg	N	75.5	3.8	148,709	51.6	19.6	9.9	10.0	8.9	0.0	60.6	39.4	31,418
Halland	G	79.9	2.3	89,437	38.1	17.6	17.5	24.4	2.4	0.0	40.4	59.6	17,149
Jämtland	N	75.0	1.8	70,503	50.7	15.9	17.2	13.7	2.5	0.0	53.2	46.8	4,503
Jönköping	G	83.7	4.0	156,078	38.6	25.5	18.0	15.2	2.7	0.0	41.3	58.7	27,054
Kalmar	G	78.4	3.2	125,082	44.4	13.2	22.5	16.9	3.0	0.0	47.4	52.6	6,414
Kopparberg	S	72.1	3.4	133,188	50.7	22.8	11.7	10.0	4.8	0.0	55.5	44.5	14,556
Kristianstad	G	80.5	3.6	139,395	41.0	20.1	23.0	14.4	1.5	0.0	42.5	57.5	20,991
Kronoberg	G	79.3	2.2	85,487	39.7	14.1	22.8	19.5	3.9	0.0	43.6	56.4	10,909
Malmö area	G	86.4	5.3	204,599	50.7	18.8	27.6	0.2	2.7	0.0	53.4	46.6	13,769
Malmöhus	G	83.9	3.7	144,074	47.7	17.3	17.1	16.8	0.7	0.4	48.4	51.2	4,069
Norrbotten	N	73.8	2.8	109,493	49.3	11.0	13.5	9.0	17.2	0.0	66.4	33.6	36,001
Skaraborg	G	78.9	3.4	132,785	35.1	25.5	18.6	18.2	2.6	0.0	37.7	62.3	32,677
Stockholm	S	79.6	11.3	440,116	36.5	35.6	20.9	0.1	6.9	0.0	43.4	56.6	57,966
Stockholm County	S	81.4	5.3	205,751	42.3	28.2	19.4	4.5	5.6	0.0	47.9	52.1	8,582
Södermanland	S	84.1	3.2	122,228	53.8	22.6	12.0	9.5	2.1	0.0	55.9	44.1	14,458
Uppsala	S	79.4	2.2	85,623	47.2	22.2	16.6	11.4	2.6	0.0	49.8	50.2	351
Värmland	S	77.9	3.9	153,179	50.0	18.6	15.4	9.1	6.9	0.0	56.9	43.1	21,015
Västerbotten	N	78.6	3.0	117,203	46.2	26.3	14.1	10.8	2.6	0.0	48.7	51.3	2,978
Västernorrland	N	79.6	3.9	151,443	52.0	19.5	9.5	11.5	7.5	0.0	59.5	40.5	28,768
Västmanland	S	80.0	2.8	110,486	55.0	20.4	10.6	9.8	4.2	0.0	59.3	40.7	20,440
Älvsborg N	G	79.0	2.7	105,278	41.6	28.1	13.6	14.0	2.7	0.0	44.3	55.7	11,958
Älvsborg S	G	84.5	2.5	96,081	39.5	17.0	27.7	12.2	3.6	0.0	43.1	56.9	13,272
Örebro	S	78.5	3.5	135,831	50.5	23.7	11.9	8.3	5.6	0.0	56.1	43.9	16,548
Östergötland	G	81.5	5.0	194,040	50.6	18.2	18.5	8.8	3.9	0.0	54.5	45.5	17,395
Total		79.8	100.0	3,879,330	44.6	23.8	17.1	9.5	5.0	0.1	49.6	50.4	30,390
Source: SCB

=== By votes ===
Location	Land	Turnout	Share	Votes	S	FP	H	B	K	Other	Left	Right	Margin
Location		%	%										
Blekinge	G	78.4	2.0	75,997	35,502	19,311	11,448	6,769	2,967		38,469	37,528	941
Bohuslän	G	76.8	2.8	106,899	42,837	33,580	15,822	10,764	3,896		46,733	60,166	13,433
Gothenburg	G	80.1	5.4	210,607	74,431	86,457	25,102	166	23,199	1,252	97,630	111,725	14,095
Gotland	G	81.4	0.8	29,738	10,491	6,326	4,903	7,792	226		10,717	19,021	8,304
Gävleborg	N	75.5	3.8	148,709	76,784	29,060	14,685	14,900	13,279	1	90,063	58,645	31,418
Halland	G	79.9	2.3	89,437	34,039	15,724	15,699	21,870	2,105		36,144	53,293	17,149
Jämtland	N	75.0	1.8	70,503	35,768	11,241	12,127	9,627	1,730	10	37,498	32,995	4,503
Jönköping	G	83.7	4.0	156,078	60,332	39,801	28,055	23,707	4,177	6	64,509	91,563	27,054
Kalmar	G	78.4	3.2	125,082	55,544	16,456	28,187	21,104	3,789	2	59,333	65,747	6,414
Kopparberg	S	72.1	3.4	133,188	67,564	30,414	15,535	13,367	6,308		73,872	59,316	14,556
Kristianstad	G	80.5	3.6	139,395	57,107	28,027	32,104	20,060	2,093	4	59,200	80,191	20,991
Kronoberg	G	79.3	2.2	85,487	33,972	12,026	19,495	16,677	3,317		37,289	48,198	10,909
Malmö area	G	86.4	5.3	204,599	103,668	38,434	56,440	538	5,513	6	109,181	95,412	13,769
Malmöhus	G	83.9	3.7	144,074	68,725	24,912	24,585	24,250	953	649	69,678	73,747	4,069
Norrbotten	N	73.8	2.8	109,493	53,914	12,065	14,809	9,871	18,832	2	72,746	36,745	36,001
Skaraborg	G	78.9	3.4	132,785	46,571	33,791	24,748	24,190	3,481	4	50,052	82,729	32,677
Stockholm	S	79.6	11.3	440,116	160,496	156,694	92,001	342	30,575	8	191,071	249,037	57,966
Stockholm County	S	81.4	5.3	205,751	87,020	57,944	39,896	9,325	11,563	3	98,583	107,165	8,582
Södermanland	S	84.1	3.2	122,228	65,713	27,585	14,668	11,632	2,630		68,343	53,885	14,458
Uppsala	S	79.4	2.2	85,623	40,373	19,015	14,240	9,730	2,261	4	42,634	42,985	351
Värmland	S	77.9	3.9	153,179	76,532	28,497	23,592	13,991	10,563	4	87,095	66,080	21,015
Västerbotten	N	78.6	3.0	117,203	54,088	30,876	16,566	12,646	3,022	5	57,110	60,088	2,978
Västernorrland	N	79.6	3.9	151,443	78,769	29,538	14,327	17,470	11,334	5	90,103	61,335	28,768
Västmanland	S	80.0	2.8	110,486	60,760	22,493	11,707	10,823	4,703		65,463	45,023	20,440
Älvsborg N	G	79.0	2.7	105,278	43,774	29,532	14,328	14,756	2,884	4	46,658	58,616	11,958
Älvsborg S	G	84.5	2.5	96,081	37,939	16,322	26,585	11,769	3,465	1	41,404	54,676	13,272
Örebro	S	78.5	3.5	135,831	68,531	32,197	16,148	11,295	7,657	3	76,188	59,640	16,548
Östergötland	G	81.5	5.0	194,040	98,219	35,246	35,891	17,181	7,494	9	105,713	88,318	17,395
Total		79.8	100.0	3,879,330	1,729,463	923,564	663,693	366,612	194,016	1,982	1,923,479	1,953,869	30,390
Source: SCB

== Results by municipality ==
1956 had the postal votes were counted separately from the polling station votes in one unified count across municipalities. The exception to these results are those where the whole constituency was one municipality - namely Gothenburg, Gotland and Stockholm where all postal votes were automatically denoted as part of said municipalities.

Only parties or constellations that got votes in any given constituency are listed.

=== Blekinge ===
Location	Share	Votes	S	FP	H	B	K	Left	Right
Asarum	5.7	4,306	52.3	12.0	13.2	11.4	11.1	63.4	36.6
Bräkne-Hoby	2.7	2,081	43.5	24.8	12.4	17.0	2.2	45.7	54.3
Fridlevstad	2.6	1,956	38.8	20.1	25.5	13.3	2.4	41.2	58.8
Gammalstorp	2.0	1,505	43.3	22.9	19.1	14.1	0.7	43.9	56.1
Hallabro	1.9	1,439	31.0	16.7	31.3	20.2	0.9	31.9	68.1
Hasslö	0.8	606	48.2	18.5	1.0	16.8	15.5	63.7	36.3
Hällaryd	2.3	1,714	51.1	10.3	12.1	23.0	3.4	54.5	45.5
Jämjö	4.5	3,385	36.9	26.2	14.0	21.9	1.0	37.9	62.1
Jämshög	2.5	1,873	46.2	13.5	19.5	14.7	6.1	52.3	47.7
Karlshamn	7.8	5,912	52.0	23.0	20.9	0.5	3.7	55.7	44.3
Karlskrona	21.8	16,584	45.1	38.9	12.5	0.3	3.3	48.3	51.7
Kyrkhult	2.6	1,969	43.1	9.3	24.1	18.7	4.8	47.9	52.1
Listerby	2.6	1,993	47.5	20.5	11.4	17.9	2.7	50.2	49.8
Lyckeby	3.8	2,853	43.8	32.6	19.3	23.1	3.1	46.9	53.1
Mjällby	3.6	2,754	38.4	30.5	19.6	10.7	0.7	39.1	60.9
Mörrum	2.9	2,222	45.8	14.1	14.0	10.8	15.2	61.0	39.0
Nättraby	1.7	1,278	53.0	26.0	14.5	4.5	2.0	55.0	45.0
Olofström	3.0	2,278	60.9	16.8	14.0	1.9	6.4	67.3	32.7
Ramdala	1.5	1,144	44.5	22.0	17.7	13.5	2.2	46.7	53.3
Ronneby city	6.0	4,586	54.9	27.6	13.8	1.0	2.7	57.7	42.3
Ronneby rural	5.2	3,964	60.2	18.4	8.2	8.7	4.4	64.7	35.3
Rödeby	2.5	1,877	41.2	30.8	11.2	15.2	1.5	42.7	57.3
Sturkö	1.0	729	52.0	25.2	7.8	24.4	3.8	55.8	44.2
Sölvesborg	4.3	3,252	52.5	22.4	20.8	0.7	3.7	56.2	43.8
Tving	2.3	1,770	34.4	18.0	17.9	27.7	2.1	36.4	63.6
Postal vote	2.6	1,967	29.9	31.2	34.8	3.3	0.8	30.7	69.3
Total	2.0	75,997	46.7	25.4	15.1	8.9	3.9	50.6	49.4
Source:SCB

=== Dalarna ===
Dalarna County was known as Kopparberg County at the time, but shared the same borders as in the 21st century.

Kopparberg County

Location	Share	Votes	S	FP	H	B	K	Left	Right
Avesta	3.5	4,698	63.0	18.2	8.0	0.3	10.4	73.4	26.6
Bjursås	1.1	1,412	46.3	25.0	7.7	16.3	4.7	51.0	49.0
Boda	0.5	639	35.2	30.0	5.3	26.0	3.4	38.7	61.3
Borlänge	9.2	12,209	63.3	21.0	9.1	1.3	5.3	68.6	31.4
By	1.9	2,477	53.7	15.5	6.9	18.7	5.2	58.9	41.1
Enviken	0.8	1,024	41.1	20.4	12.8	25.3	0.4	41.5	58.5
Falun	6.5	8,700	40.5	34.9	22.6	0.2	1.8	42.3	57.7
Floda	0.9	1,263	48.9	15.4	11.0	21.8	2.9	51.8	48.2
Folkärna	1.6	2,150	44.9	16.7	9.5	25.3	3.7	48.6	51.4
Gagnef	2.3	3,008	51.7	19.9	5.3	20.6	2.6	54.2	45.8
Grangärde	4.2	5,630	61.0	17.5	6.3	3.0	12.2	73.2	26.8
Grytnäs	1.5	2,037	54.5	16.0	5.8	14.8	9.0	63.5	36.5
Gustafs	1.1	1,458	34.3	24.0	6.9	32.2	2.6	36.9	63.1
Hedemora city	2.0	2,722	47.4	28.6	19.1	2.3	2.7	50.0	50.0
Hedemora rural	2.6	3,483	52.5	12.1	9.0	22.5	3.8	56.4	43.6
Husby	2.3	2,999	60.5	14.1	5.8	15.8	3.8	64.3	35.7
Idre	0.4	596	54.9	26.5	6.2	6.5	5.9	60.7	39.3
Järna	2.7	3,591	46.5	19.2	16.5	8.1	9.7	56.1	43.9
Krylbo	1.3	1,739	63.5	23.9	6.8	0.5	5.3	68.8	31.2
Leksand	3.4	4,555	40.3	27.3	16.5	15.0	0.9	41.2	58.8
Lima	0.9	1,165	50.6	24.7	9.7	13.3	1.6	52.3	47.7
Ludvika city	4.2	5,574	55.2	27.0	13.0	0.3	4.5	59.7	40.3
Ludvika rural	2.5	3,365	64.3	18.1	5.0	2.6	9.9	74.2	25.8
Malung	3.5	4,639	53.9	27.1	14.7	2.3	2.0	55.9	44.1
Mora	2.8	3,763	40.2	24.1	12.6	19.2	3.9	44.1	55.9
Morastrand	1.3	1,723	44.2	30.9	18.5	4.5	1.8	46.0	54.0
Norrbärke	1.9	2,512	65.6	12.1	6.7	9.4	6.2	71.8	28.2
Nås	0.6	810	46.4	21.6	8.9	19.0	4.1	50.5	49.5
Ore	0.8	1,061	38.1	25.2	5.0	9.3	22.4	60.5	39.5
Orsa	2.5	3,362	44.6	24.8	12.8	12.3	5.4	50.1	49.9
Rättvik	2.5	3,398	43.3	27.5	18.3	8.6	2.3	45.6	54.4
Siljansnäs	0.5	603	47.9	20.7	8.1	20.7	2.5	50.4	49.6
Smedjebacken	1.7	2,266	69.5	16.1	8.6	0.6	5.2	74.7	25.3
Sollerön	0.5	666	29.1	23.6	9.0	34.4	3.9	33.0	67.0
Stora Kopparberg	3.2	4,241	55.5	24.1	10.5	5.1	4.7	60.2	39.8
Stora Skedvi	1.1	1,492	28.9	16.6	11.7	41.2	1.6	30.5	69.5
Stora Tuna	3.9	5,142	42.3	18.8	9.5	25.6	3.8	46.1	53.9
Sundborn	0.7	955	38.7	23.5	10.9	21.7	5.2	44.0	56.0
Svärdsjö	2.0	2,717	41.6	26.8	10.0	19.3	2.4	43.9	56.1
Säfsnäs	0.9	1,208	74.9	13.0	4.5	1.7	6.0	80.9	19.1
Särna	0.5	661	43.9	27.2	10.7	13.5	4.7	48.6	51.4
Säter	1.6	2,106	53.4	24.2	11.0	9.4	2.0	55.4	44.6
Söderbärke	1.4	1,799	60.6	16.1	6.9	13.8	2.5	63.1	36.9
Transtrand	0.6	810	67.3	23.7	5.7	2.6	0.7	68.0	32.0
Venjan	0.5	603	33.0	27.2	18.7	20.2	0.8	33.3	66.7
Vika	1.2	1,624	46.3	19.4	12.4	9.2	12.7	59.0	41.0
Våmhus	0.4	537	40.2	21.2	10.1	25.0	3.5	43.8	56.2
Ål	0.9	1,226	42.7	35.6	8.6	12.1	1.1	43.7	56.3
Älvdalen	2.0	2,631	38.2	36.3	10.8	11.6	3.0	41.2	58.8
Äppelbo	0.6	763	42.1	13.6	11.1	27.1	6.0	48.1	51.9
Postal vote	2.5	3,376	34.7	29.9	31.7	2.5	1.2	35.9	64.1
Total	3.4	133,188	50.7	22.8	11.7	10.0	4.8	55.5	44.5
Source:SCB

=== Gothenburg and Bohus ===
==== Bohuslän ====
Turnout	Share	Votes	S	FP	H	B	K	Left	Right
Askim	1.7	1,794	23.9	46.1	18.6	9.1	2.4	26.3	73.7
Bullaren	1.0	1,102	22.1	30.4	16.8	29.4	1.4	23.4	76.6
Forshälla	0.8	853	29.1	15.6	23.7	31.2	0.5	29.5	70.5
Hermansby	1.2	1,244	17.4	20.4	21.7	39.6	0.9	18.2	81.8
Inlands Torpe	1.8	1,875	49.6	17.9	10.1	20.2	2.2	51.8	48.2
Kode	1.6	1,761	17.4	18.3	36.7	27.4	0.2	17.6	82.4
Kungälv	2.6	2,740	49.6	26.0	14.6	3.9	5.9	55.6	44.4
Kville	2.4	2,548	33.6	28.5	11.8	25.5	0.7	34.2	65.8
Kållered	0.8	908	35.0	38.1	14.5	8.5	3.9	38.9	61.1
Landvetter	1.4	1,479	30.4	39.0	12.0	15.5	3.1	33.5	66.5
Lane-Ryr	0.4	420	11.7	26.9	20.0	41.4	0.0	11.7	88.3
Ljungskile	1.4	1,518	36.6	27.4	26.7	8.2	1.2	37.7	62.3
Lysekil	4.2	4,444	59.3	20.6	14.1	2.5	3.5	62.8	37.2
Marstrand	0.5	512	35.2	51.0	12.7	0.6	0.6	35.7	64.3
Morlanda	1.6	1,683	34.5	42.6	16.9	5.5	0.5	35.0	65.0
Munkedal	2.5	2,696	63.7	15.9	8.9	10.2	1.3	65.0	35.0
Myckleby	1.3	1,431	30.1	29.1	16.3	24.5	0.0	30.1	69.9
Mölndal	10.8	11,565	48.2	32.1	6.2	0.7	12.7	60.9	39.1
Partille	6.9	7,387	39.5	40.2	9.7	0.6	10.0	49.5	50.5
Romelanda	1.2	1,256	31.4	20.1	17.9	28.6	2.0	33.4	66.6
Råda	2.0	2,110	47.5	33.9	7.9	1.4	9.3	56.8	43.2
Skaftö	1.4	1,515	23.0	42.3	19.2	15.4	0.1	23.0	77.0
Skredsvik	1.5	1,607	30.4	30.9	12.8	24.3	1.5	31.9	68.1
Smögen	0.7	798	17.5	64.8	17.2	0.5	0.0	17.5	82.5
Stenungsund	2.3	2,499	29.9	30.3	18.7	20.3	0.8	30.7	69.3
Strömstad	1.6	1,753	51.5	29.9	16.7	0.5	1.4	52.9	47.1
Styrsö	1.2	1,336	13.2	65.1	21.3	0.0	0.4	13.5	86.5
Stångenäs	2.3	2,508	54.5	16.5	16.3	11.9	0.8	55.3	44.7
Svarteborg	1.3	1,425	29.0	28.3	17.8	24.5	0.4	29.4	70.6
Säve	1.3	1,348	32.8	23.6	18.5	23.7	1.5	34.3	65.7
Södra Sotenäs	2.6	2,794	53.1	32.5	7.7	4.0	2.7	55.8	44.2
Sörbygden	1.2	1,243	12.7	21.0	31.8	34.5	0.0	12.7	87.3
Tanum	2.7	2,936	29.9	27.4	19.6	23.1	0.1	30.0	70.0
Tegneby	1.6	1,702	23.5	32.5	20.3	23.2	0.4	23.9	76.1
Tjärnö	0.6	613	22.3	55.1	15.3	6.9	0.3	22.7	77.3
Tjörn	3.4	3,596	17.2	59.9	16.1	6.3	0.4	17.6	82.4
Torslanda	1.0	1,098	20.1	23.8	11.7	40.9	3.6	23.7	76.3
Tossene	1.9	2,050	60.3	21.0	9.9	6.6	2.2	62.5	37.5
Tuve	1.1	1,143	37.1	35.2	10.1	11.4	6.3	43.4	56.6
Uddevalla	12.9	13,817	55.4	26.4	13.6	1.7	2.9	58.2	41.8
Vette	2.8	2,989	49.4	15.1	7.4	27.0	1.1	50.6	49.4
Ytterby	1.1	1,153	50.2	16.7	21.2	10.3	1.6	51.9	48.1
Öckerö	3.1	3,306	14.8	58.2	26.5	0.2	0.3	15.2	84.8
Postal vote	2.2	2,344	28.6	35.0	31.9	3.6	0.9	29.5	70.5
Total	2.8	106,899	40.1	31.4	14.8	10.1	3.6	43.7	56.3
Source:SCB

==== Gothenburg ====
Location	Share	Votes	S	FP	H	B	K	Other	Left	Right
Gothenburg	100.0	210,607	35.3	41.1	11.9	0.1	11.0	0.6	46.4	53.0
Total	5.4	210,607	35.3	41.1	11.9	0.1	11.0	0.6	46.4	53.0
Source: SCB

=== Gotland ===
Location	Share	Votes	S	FP	H	B	K	Left	Right
Dalhem	4.9	1,464	21.5	17.6	16.1	44.7	0.1	21.6	78.4
Fårösund	5.5	1,634	45.5	17.8	12.0	22.9	1.9	47.4	52.6
Havdhem	4.8	1,424	24.2	22.8	7.2	45.5	0.4	24.5	75.5
Hemse	6.4	1,895	25.0	29.4	10.5	34.5	0.6	25.6	74.4
Hoburg	2.9	874	20.5	23.5	13.4	41.6	1.0	21.5	78.5
Klintehamn	8.2	2,430	27.6	24.7	16.3	30.9	0.5	28.1	71.9
Ljugarn	4.4	1,299	20.3	25.4	15.1	39.1	0.1	20.4	79.6
Lärbro	4.5	1,336	57.0	8.6	7.9	24.7	1.8	58.8	41.2
Romakloster	10.4	3,078	32.8	19.7	12.7	34.3	0.5	33.3	66.7
Slite	4.7	1,398	56.7	16.7	13.6	11.2	1.8	58.4	41.6
Stenkumla	5.5	1,625	26.8	21.0	12.7	38.7	0.7	27.6	72.4
Stånga	3.7	1,099	18.7	21.5	13.1	46.1	0.5	19.3	80.7
Tingstäde	6.4	1,908	27.9	11.9	11.1	48.7	0.3	28.2	71.8
Visby	25.3	7,521	47.8	23.6	25.5	2.2	0.9	48.7	51.3
Postal vote	2.5	753	22.6	29.9	39.3	8.1	0.1	22.7	77.3
Total	0.8	29,738	35.3	21.3	16.5	26.2	0.7	36.0	64.0
Source:SCB

=== Gävleborg ===
Location	Share	Votes	S	FP	H	B	K	Left	Right
Alfta	2.0	2,948	42.3	24.1	9.4	20.8	3.3	45.7	54.3
Arbrå	2.0	3,013	41.8	23.2	8.5	15.5	11.1	52.8	47.2
Bergsjö	1.1	1,710	35.3	12.7	5.9	35.9	10.1	45.4	54.6
Bjuråker	1.4	2,088	50.6	10.6	4.6	28.3	5.9	56.5	43.5
Bollnäs city	2.0	3,022	50.9	29.8	13.7	1.3	4.3	55.2	44.8
Bollnäs rural	3.1	4,680	46.8	18.7	7.9	16.2	10.4	57.2	42.8
Delsbo	1.4	2,098	37.3	9.2	8.9	41.2	3.3	40.7	59.3
Enånger	0.8	1,124	47.0	7.7	1.9	32.8	10.7	57.7	42.3
Forsa	1.7	2,500	40.1	12.8	7.2	28.6	11.4	51.4	48.6
Färila	1.7	2,544	42.6	13.9	7.2	23.5	12.9	55.4	44.6
Gnarp	1.0	1,514	45.4	28.3	3.2	19.7	3.4	48.8	51.2
Gävle	17.4	25,914	52.3	28.3	14.7	0.1	4.5	56.8	43.2
Hamrånge	1.8	2,632	75.6	12.5	4.1	4.5	3.3	78.9	21.1
Hanebo	1.9	2,753	55.0	13.2	4.5	16.3	11.0	66.0	34.0
Harmånger	1.8	2,623	45.3	14.6	5.7	23.4	11.0	56.3	43.7
Hassela	0.7	1,084	56.4	17.7	2.2	14.8	8.9	65.3	34.7
Hedesunda	1.1	1,638	41.2	25.9	8.4	16.8	7.7	48.9	51.1
Hille	1.1	1,659	50.1	22.8	6.8	12.1	8.3	58.4	41.6
Hofors	3.4	5,026	61.5	12.2	6.2	0.3	19.9	81.3	18.7
Hudiksvall	3.5	5,218	39.9	27.2	14.4	4.3	14.2	54.1	45.9
Hälsingtuna	1.2	1,765	37.2	11.3	5.2	34.7	11.6	48.8	51.2
Järbo	1.0	1,475	44.4	15.9	14.1	18.8	6.7	51.1	48.9
Järvsö	1.7	2,471	32.2	20.8	7.8	26.5	12.7	44.9	55.1
Ljusdal rural	2.0	3,001	50.0	13.2	4.5	13.3	18.9	68.9	31.1
Ljusdal town	1.3	1,887	43.1	29.2	16.2	2.5	9.0	52.1	47.9
Los	1.0	1,431	61.4	20.4	5.0	2.2	11.0	72.4	27.6
Njutånger	1.8	2,661	56.8	15.0	3.0	6.8	18.3	75.2	24.8
Norrala	1.4	2,043	46.8	13.8	3.9	27.9	7.5	54.3	45.7
Ockelbo	2.4	3,520	52.3	13.0	14.4	16.7	3.7	55.9	44.1
Ovansjö	2.8	4,101	55.9	14.3	7.0	12.6	10.1	66.0	34.0
Ovanåker	2.9	4,278	52.5	21.8	11.1	12.6	2.2	54.6	45.4
Ramsjö	0.5	769	40.1	7.8	3.3	7.2	41.7	81.8	18.2
Rengsjö	0.6	819	32.0	13.7	5.5	29.9	18.9	50.9	49.1
Sandviken	7.8	11,667	67.5	15.5	8.9	0.4	7.8	75.2	24.8
Skog	1.0	1,547	52.4	15.1	9.8	19.5	3.1	55.5	44.5
Storvik	0.8	1,131	50.7	27.9	14.6	1.4	5.5	56.1	43.9
Söderala	5.5	8,209	65.6	9.3	3.9	6.7	14.5	80.1	19.9
Söderhamn	4.3	6,360	51.9	23.1	13.1	0.3	11.6	63.6	36.4
Torsåker	1.3	1,879	43.1	20.2	13.5	16.0	7.1	50.2	49.8
Valbo	4.1	6,070	60.5	18.1	7.7	4.7	8.9	69.4	30.6
Årsunda	0.6	915	38.6	17.3	13.9	23.4	6.9	45.5	54.5
Österfärnebo	0.8	1,233	34.3	23.9	9.8	25.6	6.3	40.6	59.4
Postal vote	2.5	3,689	36.6	29.1	28.1	3.5	2.7	39.3	60.7
Total	3.8	148,709	51.6	19.6	9.9	10.0	8.9	60.6	39.4
Source:SCB

=== Halland ===
Location	Share	Votes	S	FP	H	B	K	Left	Right
Eldsberga	1.6	1,444	38.4	13.4	12.7	35.0	0.4	38.9	61.1
Enslöv	1.6	1,400	36.9	13.4	9.0	38.2	2.4	39.4	60.6
Falkenberg	6.2	5,582	53.4	20.0	17.2	8.0	1.3	54.7	45.3
Fjärås	2.2	1,963	28.9	9.0	15.6	46.4	0.2	29.1	70.9
Getinge	1.4	1,215	49.0	7.7	18.8	24.6	0.0	49.0	51.0
Halmstad	21.6	19,286	47.6	26.3	18.8	0.9	6.4	54.0	46.0
Harplinge	1.7	1,542	43.7	8.0	23.9	21.4	2.9	46.6	53.4
Himledalen	1.8	1,639	20.6	8.9	15.7	54.5	0.2	20.8	79.2
Hishult	0.9	805	17.3	13.9	18.0	49.4	1.4	18.6	81.4
Karup	1.5	1,381	22.6	12.4	19.9	45.0	0.1	22.7	77.3
Knäred	1.3	1,198	24.5	12.2	16.4	46.7	0.2	24.6	75.4
Kungsbacka	2.2	1,992	40.8	28.1	26.8	2.8	1.6	42.4	57.6
Kvibille	1.6	1,395	35.2	7.2	16.1	40.4	1.1	36.3	63.7
Laholm city	2.0	1,787	44.8	22.7	20.0	11.8	0.8	45.5	54.5
Laholm rural	1.0	927	29.2	9.3	12.5	48.8	0.2	29.4	70.6
Lindberga	1.6	1,470	21.3	12.3	18.9	46.8	0.7	22.0	78.0
Lindome	1.7	1,559	41.2	23.7	11.2	21.3	2.6	43.8	56.2
Löftadalen	1.9	1,664	16.0	13.3	12.9	57.6	0.2	16.2	83.8
Morup	2.3	2,074	30.6	8.6	11.0	49.6	0.1	30.8	69.2
Onsala	1.1	941	28.7	28.7	22.4	19.9	0.3	29.0	71.0
Oskarström	1.8	1,596	69.3	13.2	9.5	1.8	6.2	75.5	24.5
Ränneslöv	1.9	1,671	24.0	9.0	13.5	53.3	0.2	24.2	75.8
Simlångsdalen	2.3	2,064	37.3	15.2	15.9	30.0	1.6	38.9	61.1
Särö	1.8	1,597	28.1	25.4	17.6	28.8	0.1	28.2	71.8
Söndrum	1.6	1,437	56.2	14.8	14.0	11.8	3.2	59.4	40.6
Torup	2.7	2,433	39.1	10.2	22.0	28.0	0.6	39.7	60.3
Träslöv	1.0	875	29.5	17.1	21.0	31.0	1.4	30.9	69.1
Tvååker	2.4	2,172	20.7	12.2	11.2	55.2	0.8	21.5	78.5
Tölö	1.3	1,127	28.1	14.6	17.2	38.9	1.2	29.3	70.7
Ullared	1.2	1,047	23.7	12.8	20.4	43.1	0.0	23.7	76.3
Varberg	7.8	6,939	52.0	25.7	16.3	2.0	4.0	55.9	44.1
Veddige	1.6	1,415	22.9	14.2	16.5	46.4	0.0	22.9	77.1
Veinge	2.1	1,875	36.6	10.5	10.5	42.0	0.4	37.1	62.9
Vessigebro	2.3	2,054	23.2	6.8	17.6	52.0	0.3	23.6	76.4
Vinberg	1.8	1,627	25.8	6.8	14.5	52.9	0.1	25.9	74.1
Våxtorp	1.4	1,225	24.6	12.5	12.2	50.3	0.4	25.0	75.0
Värö	1.4	1,231	21.4	15.8	15.0	47.7	0.0	21.4	78.6
Årstad	2.7	2,412	34.9	6.1	21.7	36.7	0.6	35.5	64.5
Ätran	1.5	1,358	21.9	8.9	14.9	54.3	0.1	21.9	78.1
Postal vote	2.3	2,018	20.9	25.1	44.5	9.0	0.6	21.5	78.5
Total	2.3	89,437	38.1	17.6	17.5	24.4	2.4	40.4	59.6
Source:SCB

=== Jämtland ===
Location	Share	Votes	S	FP	H	B	K	Left	Right
Alsen	1.3	944	44.2	13.5	19.6	18.2	4.6	48.7	51.3
Berg	2.0	1,400	39.5	11.3	17.6	29.1	2.5	42.0	58.0
Brunflo	4.0	2,825	48.1	13.5	12.8	24.1	1.4	49.5	50.5
Bräcke	2.4	1,677	62.4	12.6	13.0	9.1	3.0	65.4	34.6
Fors	1.8	1,301	55.0	13.4	14.1	10.5	7.1	62.1	37.9
Frostviken	1.9	1,339	74.9	7.8	9.5	7.1	0.7	75.6	24.4
Frösö	5.3	3,743	41.5	25.2	23.8	7.3	2.1	43.7	56.3
Föllinge	2.4	1,672	45.7	17.9	17.2	18.7	0.4	46.1	53.9
Hackås	2.5	1,788	38.8	10.0	18.6	31.2	1.5	40.3	59.7
Hallen	1.4	986	30.5	17.5	15.8	35.6	0.5	31.0	69.0
Hammerdal	4.2	2,938	51.8	11.2	13.0	22.4	1.6	53.4	46.6
Hede	1.7	1,202	54.3	17.3	8.4	12.4	7.6	61.9	38.1
Hogdal	1.4	1,005	61.6	12.3	10.5	8.3	7.3	68.9	31.1
Hotagen	0.6	425	68.5	9.2	11.5	9.6	1.2	69.6	30.4
Häggenås	1.5	1,037	49.6	13.6	15.5	20.3	1.0	50.5	49.5
Kall	0.8	556	54.9	15.6	12.1	16.4	1.1	55.9	44.1
Kälarne	2.9	2,036	62.6	10.3	11.1	14.0	2.0	64.6	35.4
Lillhärdal	1.0	699	55.5	25.9	6.4	7.3	4.9	60.4	39.6
Lit	2.6	1,809	44.4	11.5	12.3	28.4	3.3	47.8	52.2
Mörsil	1.9	1,362	49.6	19.5	14.7	12.2	4.0	53.6	46.4
Offerdal	2.6	1,858	41.8	17.3	15.9	24.1	0.9	42.7	57.3
Oviken	1.9	1,361	32.3	11.9	16.2	38.7	0.9	33.1	66.9
Ragunda	3.3	2,342	61.1	10.0	10.9	15.8	2.1	63.2	36.8
Revsund	3.9	2,744	57.5	9.8	16.0	14.5	2.2	59.6	40.4
Rätan	1.1	785	59.4	15.5	8.9	10.4	5.7	65.1	34.9
Rödön	5.1	3,610	51.5	12.9	16.2	16.6	2.9	54.3	45.7
Ström	5.6	3,941	62.8	10.9	12.4	12.2	1.8	64.6	35.4
Stugun	2.5	1,751	67.5	4.6	9.0	15.1	3.7	71.2	28.8
Sveg rural	2.3	1,605	61.1	15.1	7.1	8.8	7.9	68.9	31.1
Sveg town	1.3	939	53.0	20.8	23.1	1.4	1.7	54.7	45.3
Tännäs	1.3	885	60.1	24.3	9.9	4.0	1.7	61.8	38.2
Undersåker	2.4	1,698	52.9	19.5	17.4	8.8	1.4	54.3	45.7
Åre	2.1	1,477	46.2	28.6	15.9	6.9	2.4	48.6	51.4
Östersund	16.0	11,303	44.9	22.7	27.9	2.3	2.2	47.1	52.9
Öv Ljungadalen	1.7	1,171	47.8	9.9	19.0	21.2	2.0	49.9	50.1
Postal vote	3.2	2,289	38.5	22.8	32.3	5.3	0.7	39.2	60.4
Total	1.8	70,503	50.7	15.9	17.2	13.7	2.5	53.2	46.8
Source:SCB

=== Jönköping ===
Location	Share	Votes	S	FP	H	B	K	Left	Right
Alseda	1.8	2,769	32.1	23.9	15.6	27.3	1.1	33.2	66.8
Anderstorp	1.1	1,731	48.5	23.9	15.5	10.0	2.1	50.6	49.4
Bankeryd	1.1	1,762	44.4	30.8	19.4	3.7	1.6	46.1	53.9
Björkö	0.7	1,143	23.2	21.7	19.4	35.3	0.3	23.5	76.5
Bodafors	0.9	1,421	47.6	29.1	11.9	5.6	5.8	53.3	46.7
Bor	0.9	1,451	30.8	25.4	15.5	27.9	0.3	31.2	68.8
Bredaryd	0.7	1,163	31.6	21.2	11.6	35.1	0.6	32.2	67.8
Bredestad	1.6	2,557	31.3	32.7	15.5	19.9	0.5	31.8	69.2
Burseryd	1.1	1,727	19.6	17.8	21.7	40.8	0.1	19.7	80.3
Bäckaby	1.0	1,503	10.6	20.4	17.9	50.9	0.2	10.8	89.2
Eksjö	3.3	5,200	40.5	28.9	22.4	7.7	0.5	41.0	59.0
Forserum	1.4	2,136	41.5	22.9	13.4	18.9	3.2	44.7	55.3
Forsheda	1.2	1,909	24.5	19.6	11.8	43.7	0.4	24.9	75.1
Gislaved	2.3	3,568	56.7	16.3	11.1	12.3	3.6	60.3	39.7
Gnosjö	2.3	3,572	33.7	30.6	14.1	19.4	2.3	35.9	64.1
Gränna	1.1	1,750	32.6	28.7	21.0	16.6	1.1	33.7	66.3
Hakarp	0.9	1,387	52.5	26.8	10.4	4.9	5.4	57.9	42.1
Hjälmseryd	1.6	2,432	20.4	28.0	19.2	31.9	0.4	20.8	79.2
Hullaryd	0.8	1,245	12.6	41.0	19.2	26.1	1.0	13.7	86.3
Huskvarna	4.8	7,479	56.3	23.9	11.7	0.4	7.7	64.0	36.0
Hylte	2.1	3,296	40.5	10.3	16.4	30.4	2.4	42.8	57.2
Höreda	1.2	1,805	18.5	26.6	15.2	39.3	0.4	18.9	81.1
Ingatorp	1.0	1,582	39.1	20.0	13.7	26.6	0.6	39.6	60.4
Jönköping	16.0	24,967	44.8	29.1	21.6	1.5	3.1	47.9	52.1
Klevshult	1.0	1,554	12.7	36.0	25.7	25.2	0.3	13.0	87.0
Korsberga	0.8	1,225	25.6	22.6	15.5	35.9	0.4	26.0	74.0
Lannaskede	0.9	1,480	45.2	20.3	13.6	18.8	2.2	47.4	52.6
Lekeryd	0.8	1,211	14.2	31.1	19.2	35.1	0.3	14.5	85.5
Linderås	0.8	1,261	17.4	28.6	22.0	31.9	0.1	17.4	82.6
Malmbäck	1.0	1,511	21.7	23.3	26.2	28.0	0.8	22.5	77.5
Mariannelund	1.2	1,807	40.2	24.1	14.7	19.0	2.0	42.2	57.8
Månsarp	1.0	1,535	50.8	25.7	12.7	7.9	2.8	53.6	46.4
Norrahammar	1.9	2,930	66.5	15.4	8.6	4.3	5.2	71.7	28.3
Norra Mo	0.7	1,106	16.2	40.5	15.5	30.7	0.0	16.2	83.8
Norra Sandsjö	0.9	1,356	15.3	25.6	13.1	45.9	0.1	15.5	84.5
Nye	0.9	1,355	26.5	17.2	19.7	36.5	0.1	26.6	73.4
Nässjö	6.0	9,381	49.0	26.6	16.6	4.1	3.7	52.7	47.3
Reftele	1.3	2,020	19.4	14.1	12.7	53.6	0.3	19.7	80.3
Rydaholm	1.3	1,955	28.3	20.6	30.5	19.5	1.2	29.5	70.5
Skillingaryd	0.9	1,444	44.7	31.9	19.0	2.3	2.1	46.8	53.2
Skärstad	1.1	1,750	22.5	31.7	14.9	30.2	0.7	23.2	76.8
Solberga	1.3	2,034	37.4	23.6	10.7	25.0	3.3	40.7	59.3
Sävsjö	1.7	2,631	36.8	25.4	19.1	15.0	3.0	40.5	59.5
Södra Mo	0.8	1,217	18.9	34.8	15.6	30.7	0.0	18.9	81.1
Tenhult	1.6	2,422	33.4	24.6	20.4	20.9	0.8	34.2	65.8
Tranås	5.1	7,883	47.4	26.1	18.1	4.9	3.6	51.0	49.0
Unnaryd	0.9	1,478	16.7	11.6	22.7	48.2	0.7	17.5	82.5
Vaggeryd	1.6	2,523	35.8	23.5	19.4	12.8	8.5	44.3	55.7
Vetlanda city	2.8	4,370	45.8	25.3	21.7	2.5	4.6	50.5	49.5
Vetlanda rural	1.0	1,484	34.2	18.3	9.6	32.6	5.3	39.6	60.4
Villstad	1.4	2,112	39.4	17.9	15.8	25.8	1.1	40.5	59.5
Visingsö	0.3	505	23.0	24.4	7.9	44.6	0.2	23.2	76.8
Vrigstad	1.3	2,060	27.0	30.5	15.6	25.6	1.3	28.3	71.7
Värnamo	4.1	6,442	46.0	23.0	18.0	8.0	5.0	51.0	49.0
Postal vote	2.9	4,481	25.1	32.5	35.1	6.3	0.9	26.0	73.9
Total	4.0	156,078	38.6	25.5	18.0	15.2	2.7	41.3	58.7
Source:SCB

=== Kalmar ===
Location	Share	Votes	S	FP	H	B	K	Left	Right
Alsterbro	1.4	1,706	45.1	7.0	19.7	25.6	2.6	47.7	52.3
Borgholm	1.0	1,281	46.0	28.2	19.9	3.2	2.7	48.7	51.3
Döderhult	2.2	2,710	48.0	15.4	21.9	8.3	6.4	54.4	45.6
Dörby	1.3	1,592	52.8	13.1	22.5	9.2	2.3	55.2	44.8
Emmaboda	1.1	1,351	56.9	12.3	21.2	4.0	5.6	62.5	37.5
Fagerhult	0.9	1,118	35.1	10.5	24.0	26.7	3.8	38.9	61.1
Fliseryd	0.9	1,154	53.0	5.1	20.2	17.8	3.9	56.9	43.1
Gamleby	2.4	2,953	50.9	8.9	19.1	17.9	3.1	54.0	46.0
Gladhammar	1.7	2,132	49.0	7.3	20.3	19.7	3.8	52.8	47.2
Gärdslösa	1.3	1,652	24.2	6.7	19.2	49.9	0.1	24.2	75.8
Hallingeberg	1.6	1,991	63.1	8.2	11.8	13.3	3.7	66.8	33.2
Hjorted	1.3	1,587	50.0	9.0	11.0	24.6	5.4	55.4	44.6
Hultsfred	1.6	2,042	55.6	20.2	15.6	3.8	4.8	60.4	39.6
Högsby	3.5	4,423	44.2	13.0	22.9	14.9	5.0	49.2	50.8
Kalmar	12.4	15,467	52.7	18.5	24.0	0.8	4.0	56.6	43.4
Kristdala	1.1	1,409	33.6	10.6	31.6	23.8	0.4	34.0	66.0
Köpingsvik	1.2	1,443	12.8	7.2	16.7	62.5	0.8	13.6	86.4
Ljungbyholm	1.6	1,993	47.9	9.6	25.8	15.0	1.7	49.6	50.4
Locknevi	0.9	1,165	27.5	5.1	23.0	43.7	0.8	28.2	71.8
Loftahammar	0.6	778	27.5	6.2	37.0	28.0	1.3	28.8	71.2
Läckeby	1.2	1,509	39.8	5.4	24.9	29.2	0.7	40.5	59.5
Lönneberga	0.9	1,152	52.9	12.8	7.3	25.4	1.6	54.4	45.6
Madesjö	2.6	3,202	34.5	6.2	23.8	30.8	4.6	39.2	60.8
Misterhult	1.6	2,044	45.2	12.8	27.7	13.8	0.5	45.6	54.4
Mortorp	1.2	1,553	35.9	9.7	25.0	28.6	0.8	36.7	63.3
Målilla	1.3	1,602	48.4	13.9	21.0	14.2	2.5	50.9	49.1
Mönsterås	1.7	2,165	42.0	12.1	27.2	11.9	6.9	48.9	51.1
Mörbylånga	1.7	2,068	36.0	12.7	27.2	22.4	1.7	37.7	62.3
Mörlunda	1.7	2,149	40.1	12.0	25.7	20.9	1.3	41.4	58.6
Nybro	3.4	4,240	56.4	15.8	19.0	1.6	7.2	63.6	36.4
Oskarshamn	4.9	6,127	56.0	16.3	24.5	0.5	2.7	58.7	41.3
Ottenby	1.3	1,676	52.4	10.9	13.8	21.3	1.6	54.1	45.9
Ryssby	0.9	1,101	44.4	10.6	30.6	13.0	1.4	45.8	54.2
Sevede	2.1	2,622	28.5	7.1	16.1	47.4	0.9	29.3	70.7
Södermöre	1.3	1,580	46.1	6.2	28.4	18.8	0.4	46.6	53.4
Söderåkra	1.4	1,755	37.3	19.0	21.9	21.7	0.1	37.3	62.7
Södra Vi	1.6	2,054	34.6	12.9	18.8	32.0	1.8	36.3	63.7
Tjust-Ed	1.6	2,038	47.8	5.5	19.2	27.1	0.4	48.2	51.8
Torslunda	1.7	2,181	20.3	9.5	27.6	41.2	1.5	21.7	78.3
Torsås	2.3	2,921	28.3	11.3	22.5	37.6	0.3	28.6	71.4
Tuna	0.9	1,113	29.1	8.0	22.5	39.3	1.1	30.2	69.7
Uknadalen	1.7	2,154	43.0	8.8	21.8	26.2	0.2	43.2	56.8
Vena	1.0	1,266	24.5	5.1	25.2	43.6	1.6	26.1	73.9
Vimmerby	2.0	2,558	47.3	22.3	23.8	5.6	1.0	48.3	51.7
Virserum	2.2	2,769	42.0	18.6	24.4	13.9	1.2	43.1	56.9
Vissefjärda	1.6	2,025	40.3	5.9	18.4	33.9	1.5	41.8	58.2
Västervik	6.2	7,766	49.3	18.7	24.7	0.6	6.7	55.9	44.1
Ålem	2.1	2,569	47.0	12.7	20.0	15.1	5.1	52.2	47.8
Ölands-Åkerbo	1.8	2,241	26.4	13.3	12.2	45.0	3.1	29.5	70.5
Överum	1.4	1,746	70.8	8.1	9.6	8.7	2.7	73.6	26.4
Postal vote	2.5	3,189	28.7	20.4	43.1	6.9	0.8	29.5	70.4
Total	3.2	125,082	44.4	13.2	22.5	16.9	3.0	47.4	52.6
Source:SCB

=== Kristianstad ===
Location	Share	Votes	S	FP	H	B	K	Left	Right
Araslöv	1.5	2,130	43.8	23.8	15.3	14.9	2.2	46.0	54.0
Ausås	1.1	1,598	25.1	7.4	34.5	33.0	0.0	25.1	74.9
Barkåkra	1.1	1,545	36.2	14.6	32.6	15.8	0.8	37.0	63.0
Bjärnum	1.8	2,479	41.3	16.8	21.1	18.0	2.8	44.1	55.9
Borrby	1.4	1,946	35.7	24.0	21.1	18.9	0.4	36.1	63.9
Broby	1.3	1,807	46.5	21.4	17.0	12.3	2.8	49.3	50.7
Bromölla	1.5	2,074	64.9	16.4	8.6	1.0	9.0	73.9	26.1
Brösarp	1.1	1,547	29.2	31.0	16.5	23.2	0.1	29.3	70.7
Båstad	0.8	1,158	30.1	33.2	31.0	4.0	1.7	31.9	68.1
Degeberga	1.6	2,193	35.3	27.7	15.7	20.8	0.5	35.8	64.2
Everöd	0.9	1,216	54.7	22.8	11.8	9.9	0.9	55.6	44.4
Fjälkinge	2.1	2,939	51.9	19.5	11.6	14.0	3.0	55.0	45.0
Förslövsholm	1.3	1,831	24.8	11.3	31.2	32.3	0.4	25.2	74.8
Glemmingebro	1.0	1,432	36.1	16.1	16.6	31.1	0.1	36.2	63.8
Glimåkra	1.2	1,665	45.0	25.5	11.7	15.5	2.2	47.3	52.7
Hammenhög	1.1	1,582	34.1	18.6	19.6	27.7	0.0	34.1	65.9
Hjärnarp	0.9	1,192	32.7	5.6	34.0	27.7	0.0	32.7	67.3
Hjärsås	1.1	1,516	66.2	18.1	6.3	6.3	3.1	69.3	30.7
Hässleholm	4.4	6,162	47.5	21.3	26.7	2.8	1.7	49.2	50.8
Hästveda	1.2	1,671	33.2	11.6	19.7	34.4	1.1	34.4	65.6
Ivetofta	1.0	1,331	56.9	19.5	3.6	6.8	13.2	70.2	29.8
Kivik	1.9	2,633	31.6	24.6	27.6	16.1	0.2	31.7	68.3
Klippan	3.4	4,724	51.1	15.8	20.9	9.9	2.4	53.5	46.5
Knislinge	1.4	1,904	55.7	18.9	12.1	11.7	1.6	57.2	42.8
Kristianstad	9.5	13,212	45.4	28.1	23.3	1.5	1.7	47.2	52.8
Kvidinge	0.9	1,229	32.5	15.1	27.5	24.7	0.2	32.7	67.3
Loshult	0.7	960	42.6	8.0	24.5	22.0	2.9	45.5	54.5
Löderup	1.2	1,651	28.7	23.8	27.0	20.4	0.1	28.8	71.2
Munka-Ljungby	1.2	1,678	29.2	14.1	33.8	22.8	0.1	29.3	70.7
Nosaby	1.7	2,360	49.2	24.3	11.9	16.1	0.6	49.7	50.3
Näsum	0.6	888	41.6	19.8	18.9	12.8	6.9	48.4	51.6
Onslunda	1.0	1,350	25.9	22.3	21.9	29.9	0.1	26.0	74.0
Oppmanna-Vånga	1.1	1,547	37.6	27.4	17.1	15.9	2.0	39.6	60.4
Osby rural	0.9	1,296	39.6	13.0	15.9	29.6	2.0	41.6	58.4
Osby town	1.8	2,445	45.0	22.2	28.0	3.1	1.7	46.7	53.3
Perstorp	1.9	2,617	41.5	17.3	24.8	14.9	1.5	42.9	57.1
Riseberga	1.9	2,685	42.2	10.2	26.9	20.7	0.1	42.3	57.7
Simrishamn	2.7	3,698	48.5	21.6	21.0	8.7	0.2	48.6	51.3
Skånes-Fagerhult	0.8	1,133	37.0	15.4	29.5	16.9	1.1	38.1	61.9
Smedstorp	0.8	1,166	30.8	26.7	21.3	21.2	0.1	30.9	69.1
Stoby	1.1	1,585	30.5	15.8	20.7	32.7	0.3	30.9	69.1
Sösdala	1.9	2,585	31.1	17.8	26.7	22.4	1.9	33.0	67.0
Tollarp	1.6	2,288	35.6	31.0	23.3	9.2	0.8	36.4	63.6
Tomelilla	2.5	3,424	42.6	20.9	21.2	15.2	0.1	42.8	57.2
Tommarp	1.4	1,910	34.7	23.1	19.8	22.3	0.2	34.8	65.2
Träne	0.8	1,098	28.1	30.1	17.3	24.1	0.5	28.5	71.5
Tyringe	2.9	4,006	33.5	19.2	21.9	22.2	3.1	36.6	63.4
Vinslöv rural	1.1	1,499	31.4	24.2	17.7	26.3	0.4	31.8	68.2
Vinslöv town	0.8	1,113	42.4	30.6	22.8	3.3	0.8	43.2	56.8
Vittsjö	1.7	2,379	32.1	17.7	21.1	28.5	0.7	32.8	67.2
Vä	1.6	2,219	50.7	20.6	13.9	14.4	0.5	51.1	48.9
Västra Bjäre	1.4	1,976	18.0	9.6	29.8	42.2	0.4	18.4	81.6
Åhus	1.7	2,336	46.8	23.0	21.2	7.3	1.7	48.5	51.5
Åstorp	2.6	3,571	59.2	13.2	21.6	5.7	0.3	59.5	40.5
Ängelholm	4.5	6,246	47.6	13.8	34.3	3.9	0.3	48.0	52.0
Örkelljunga	2.7	3,784	29.2	16.6	37.8	16.1	0.2	29.5	70.5
Örkened	1.6	2,192	44.2	20.6	12.0	14.4	8.8	53.0	47.0
Östra Ljungby	1.0	1,393	32.7	16.4	26.3	24.6	0.0	32.7	67.3
Postal vote	2.6	3,601	25.9	22.2	46.6	4.7	0.5	26.4	73.5
Total	3.6	139,395	41.0	20.1	23.0	14.4	1.5	42.5	57.5
Source:SCB

=== Kronoberg ===
Location	Share	Votes	S	FP	H	B	K	Left	Right
Algutsboda	2.2	1,843	46.0	7.5	13.0	29.7	3.9	49.8	50.2
Almundsryd	2.7	2,324	37.0	13.7	28.4	15.9	5.0	42.0	58.0
Alvesta	3.6	3,103	49.4	17.4	17.7	9.2	6.2	55.6	44.4
Annerstad	2.0	1,671	23.3	16.3	18.4	39.1	2.9	26.2	73.8
Berga	2.2	1,861	26.5	20.9	18.2	33.9	0.6	27.1	72.9
Bergunda	2.3	1,992	47.7	14.9	18.4	17.3	1.7	49.4	50.6
Braås	2.0	1,720	43.1	7.2	18.7	23.2	7.8	51.0	49.0
Ekeberga	1.2	989	66.2	9.5	6.8	10.1	7.4	73.6	26.4
Göteryd	2.4	2,013	29.4	8.0	24.2	36.4	1.9	31.3	68.7
Hamneda	1.6	1,404	21.2	12.7	25.4	39.6	1.1	22.3	77.7
Hjortsberga	0.8	709	24.7	9.6	28.3	35.1	2.3	26.9	73.1
Hovmantorp	1.8	1,532	54.1	8.9	14.2	15.7	7.0	61.2	38.8
Hälleberga	1.5	1,274	61.8	9.0	9.3	11.1	8.9	70.6	29.4
Lammhult	2.2	1,918	33.5	11.7	29.5	24.9	0.5	33.9	66.1
Lenhovda	1.7	1,433	45.2	10.1	12.4	19.3	13.0	58.2	41.8
Lessebo	1.7	1,478	69.4	8.6	6.7	1.2	14.1	83.6	16.4
Lidhult	1.6	1,365	25.8	13.5	26.9	33.8	0.0	25.8	74.2
Linneryd	1.8	1,504	30.7	5.1	20.7	41.7	1.9	32.6	68.4
Ljuder	1.2	1,028	43.4	11.7	20.9	20.3	3.7	47.1	52.9
Ljungby	4.9	4,173	45.0	25.4	18.8	3.8	7.0	52.0	48.0
Markaryd rural	1.8	1,534	47.4	13.1	13.0	22.6	3.9	51.3	48.7
Markaryd town	1.3	1,090	45.6	23.8	24.0	3.2	3.4	49.0	51.0
Me. Kinnevald	1.4	1,221	23.9	6.4	35.8	33.1	0.8	24.7	75.3
Moheda	2.9	2,470	28.9	14.3	25.2	29.2	2.4	31.3	68.7
Nottebäck	1.8	1,544	57.4	8.2	10.2	16.8	7.4	64.8	35.2
Rottne	2.5	2,131	37.6	7.8	23.7	29.2	1.6	39.3	60.7
Ryssby	2.1	1,782	32.1	12.1	28.6	26.1	1.2	33.3	66.7
Skatelöv	1.1	930	30.3	8.4	32.2	28.3	0.9	31.2	68.8
Stenbrohult	1.9	1,586	56.0	11.5	20.8	10.0	1.6	57.6	42.4
Södra Sandsjö	1.1	970	35.6	10.5	18.7	25.9	9.4	44.9	55.1
Tingsryd	1.8	1,526	28.9	12.4	37.4	19.8	1.5	30.4	69.6
Traryd	3.5	2,956	42.5	20.6	17.0	17.5	2.5	45.0	55.0
Urshult	2.0	1,707	29.6	9.3	37.0	22.7	1.3	31.0	69.0
Virestad	1.9	1,584	27.2	5.4	29.4	37.9	0.1	27.3	72.7
Vislanda	2.1	1,799	34.7	10.8	25.2	28.5	0.8	35.5	64.5
Väckelsång	1.7	1,481	31.7	4.9	25.3	36.9	1.1	32.9	67.1
Västra Torsås	1.3	1,128	24.6	9.5	27.0	39.0	0.0	24.6	75.4
Växjö	12.6	10,739	42.6	21.6	29.5	2.0	4.3	46.9	53.1
Åseda rural	1.0	883	26.7	5.3	21.0	43.9	3.1	29.8	70.2
Åseda town	1.4	1,230	47.5	20.9	23.5	3.7	4.4	51.9	48.1
Älghult	2.5	2,111	44.0	9.1	13.7	20.6	12.6	56.6	43.4
Älmeboda	2.0	1,718	23.7	5.7	27.5	43.1	0.1	23.7	76.3
Älmhult	2.8	2,357	57.8	21.3	16.3	2.2	2.3	60.1	39.9
Östra Torsås	1.7	1,423	40.6	10.4	19.6	24.4	5.0	45.6	54.2
Postal vote	2.6	2,253	30.3	23.1	38.9	6.3	1.4	31.7	68.3
Total	2.2	85,487	39.7	14.1	22.8	19.5	3.9	43.6	56.4
Source:SCB

=== Malmöhus ===
==== Malmö area ====
Location	Share	Votes	S	FP	H	B	K	Left	Right
Hälsingborg	20.4	41,838	50.7	20.4	25.3	0.1	3.5	54.1	45.9
Landskrona	7.1	14,610	63.9	15.2	18.3	0.1	2.5	66.4	33.6
Lund	10.1	20,680	46.9	23.0	27.8	0.9	1.4	48.3	51.7
Malmö	58.9	120,444	51.3	17.9	27.8	0.2	2.8	54.1	45.9
Postal vote	3.4	7,027	23.4	18.5	57.1	0.2	0.7	24.1	75.9
Total	5.3	204,599	50.7	18.8	26.6	0.2	2.7	53.4	46.6
Source: SCB

==== Malmöhus County ====
Location	Share	Votes	S	FP	H	B	K	Other	Left	Right
Alstad	0.8	1,137	50.9	12.0	10.9	25.1	0.6	0.5	51.5	47.9
Anderslöv	1.7	2,470	48.7	9.9	12.2	27.9	0.5	0.9	49.2	50.0
Bara	0.9	1,309	54.1	11.0	12.2	22.2	0.3	0.2	54.4	45.4
Billesholm	1.3	1,933	61.3	13.3	11.0	10.6	3.7	0.1	65.0	34.9
Bjuv	1.5	2,203	76.7	7.2	11.3	4.2	0.6	0.0	77.3	22.7
Bjärsjölagård	1.7	2,405	25.3	25.4	16.4	29.8	0.1	3.0	25.4	71.7
Blentarp	0.8	1,106	41.1	7.7	9.5	40.1	0.0	1.6	41.1	57.2
Bosarp	1.2	1,779	41.4	15.3	8.8	33.3	1.0	0.2	42.4	57.4
Brunnby	1.0	1,369	28.6	28.9	32.8	9.6	0.1	0.0	28.6	71.4
Bunkeflo	1.5	2,108	61.0	9.7	15.8	13.1	0.4	0.0	61.4	38.6
Burlöv	2.2	3,173	58.3	14.6	21.0	3.2	2.9	0.0	61.2	38.8
Dalby	1.3	1,826	48.0	13.9	14.6	23.4	0.1	0.1	48.1	51.9
Dösjebro	1.2	1,726	46.1	10.0	16.3	26.9	0.3	0.5	46.3	53.2
Ekeby	1.2	1,772	64.6	10.2	7.2	15.6	2.4	0.0	67.0	33.0
Eslöv	3.6	5,184	52.7	24.2	17.3	5.3	0.3	0.1	53.1	46.8
Flädie	0.9	1,277	42.8	16.4	22.5	18.1	0.3	0.0	43.1	56.9
Furulund	1.1	1,588	68.3	11.1	10.1	10.3	0.2	0.0	68.5	31.5
Gislöv	0.8	1,131	41.7	13.3	17.8	26.3	0.9	0.1	42.6	57.3
Genarp	0.9	1,258	45.1	9.9	15.5	29.2	0.0	0.3	45.1	54.6
Harrie	0.9	1,352	54.7	7.7	12.6	24.3	0.7	0.1	55.3	44.6
Herrestad	2.0	2,858	45.2	15.1	12.6	25.1	0.2	1.8	45.4	52.8
Härslöv	1.1	1,654	53.6	10.4	19.4	16.4	0.2	0.1	53.7	46.2
Höganäs	3.0	4,317	69.0	16.2	14.0	0.6	0.2	0.0	69.2	30.8
Hörby	1.3	1,895	40.2	42.1	14.0	3.1	0.3	0.4	40.5	59.2
Höör	1.3	1,912	35.1	36.4	25.8	2.3	0.2	0.0	35.4	64.6
Jonstorp	0.8	1,215	27.2	18.8	30.9	23.1	0.0	0.0	27.2	72.8
Kattarp	1.1	1,557	56.5	13.0	22.4	8.0	0.3	0.0	56.7	43.3
Klagstorp	1.9	2,736	45.4	16.4	12.8	24.2	0.9	0.4	46.3	53.4
Kågeröd	1.0	1,371	42.3	11.7	16.4	29.6	0.0	0.0	42.3	57.7
Kävlinge	1.4	2,065	63.4	14.5	16.4	5.3	0.3	0.0	63.7	36.3
Ljunits	1.2	1,661	47.4	12.6	9.0	30.6	0.0	0.4	47.4	52.2
Lomma	1.7	2,425	63.3	15.7	16.0	3.5	1.4	0.1	64.7	35.2
Långaröd	0.8	1,088	14.1	39.1	16.0	30.8	0.0	0.1	14.1	85.8
Löberöd	1.2	1,726	28.2	22.5	14.4	31.3	0.0	3.7	28.2	68.2
Löddeköpinge	0.8	1,197	49.0	12.2	11.8	26.3	0.5	0.2	49.5	50.3
Marieholm	1.3	1,818	43.5	12.8	12.8	30.3	0.1	0.5	43.6	55.9
Månstorp	1.0	1,472	48.0	9.0	14.3	28.5	0.2	0.0	48.2	51.8
Mörarp	1.4	2,072	49.0	11.4	21.2	18.3	0.1	0.0	49.1	50.9
Norra Frosta	1.0	1,465	27.0	23.0	20.6	28.9	0.3	0.3	27.2	72.5
Oxie	0.6	914	50.0	17.8	16.3	15.1	0.9	0.0	50.9	49.1
Rydsgård	1.4	2,024	37.5	12.3	11.3	38.3	0.0	0.7	37.5	61.9
Räng	0.8	1,088	50.8	13.9	19.6	15.7	0.0	0.0	50.8	49.2
Rönneberga	1.4	2,041	45.6	13.5	18.0	22.3	0.3	0.3	45.9	53.8
Röstånga	1.1	1,560	36.5	10.9	21.4	31.0	0.1	0.2	36.5	63.3
St. Ibb	0.2	306	36.9	19.0	31.7	12.4	0.0	0.0	36.9	63.1
Sjöbo	1.4	2,032	47.8	22.5	14.2	12.5	0.9	2.1	48.7	49.2
Skanör-Falsterbo	0.3	467	29.1	27.2	40.7	2.6	0.0	0.4	29.1	70.4
Skarhult	1.0	1,501	42.6	15.2	11.4	30.5	0.1	0.2	42.7	57.1
Skegrie	0.9	1,335	49.4	10.3	16.5	23.8	0.0	0.0	49.4	50.6
Skurup	1.8	2,631	49.7	15.9	17.5	16.2	0.1	0.6	49.8	49.7
Snogeröd	1.0	1,394	33.2	20.4	15.8	26.5	0.1	4.0	33.3	62.7
Staffanstorp	2.3	3,259	45.8	11.8	18.6	23.3	0.5	0.1	46.3	53.7
Svalöv	1.1	1,638	60.7	9.1	17.9	12.3	0.1	0.0	60.7	39.3
Svedala	2.2	3,153	59.3	17.3	12.8	9.4	1.2	0.0	60.5	39.5
Södra Sandby	1.1	1,606	49.9	14.3	13.9	21.5	0.4	0.0	50.3	49.7
Teckomatorp	1.1	1,515	45.4	13.3	16.9	24.2	0.2	0.0	45.6	54.4
Torn	1.0	1,425	48.1	11.1	13.0	27.4	0.4	0.0	48.5	51.5
Trelleborg	7.1	10,162	57.2	20.8	18.0	0.8	3.2	0.0	60.4	39.6
Vallåkra	1.3	1,843	38.7	9.3	21.0	30.8	0.1	0.1	38.8	61.2
Veberöd	0.8	1,155	44.2	13.3	14.6	27.3	0.3	0.3	44.4	55.2
Vellinge	1.4	1,958	48.9	14.8	21.8	13.9	0.6	0.0	49.5	50.5
Vemmenhög	1.4	2,038	39.9	17.5	12.2	29.6	0.3	0.4	40.2	59.4
Vollsjö	1.4	1,987	23.0	25.1	17.9	30.2	0.5	3.2	23.5	73.3
Väsby	1.6	2,314	37.9	20.0	21.9	19.9	0.3	0.0	38.2	61.8
Ystad	5.4	7,726	60.6	19.9	18.4	0.9	0.2	0.0	60.8	39.2
Ödåkra	1.5	2,154	39.3	18.0	26.3	15.9	0.5	0.0	39.8	60.2
Östra Frosta	1.9	2,798	19.5	39.2	12.5	25.5	0.1	3.1	19.7	77.3
Östra Färs	1.8	2,522	24.2	23.6	17.4	33.8	0.0	1.0	24.2	74.8
Postal vote	2.0	2,918	26.8	21.6	43.8	7.2	0.3	0.4	27.1	72.5
Total	3.7	144,074	47.7	17.3	17.1	16.8	0.7	0.4	48.4	51.2
Source:SCB

=== Norrbotten ===
Location	Share	Votes	S	FP	H	B	K	Left	Right
Arjeplog	2.0	2,240	49.6	12.0	6.4	4.0	28.0	77.6	22.4
Arvidsjaur	4.5	4,953	47.2	14.8	10.9	5.1	21.9	69.2	30.8
Boden	5.1	5,615	52.4	21.4	18.2	0.9	7.2	59.6	40.4
Edefors	1.5	1,599	50.5	16.6	7.6	6.4	18.9	69.4	30.6
Gällivare	8.2	9,003	44.0	8.5	16.7	1.9	28.9	72.9	27.1
Haparanda	1.2	1,287	41.9	12.9	30.5	1.8	13.0	54.9	45.1
Hietaniemi	1.0	1,143	37.0	2.9	8.7	38.9	12.5	49.5	50.5
Hortlax	2.2	2,416	63.2	5.3	13.5	14.2	3.8	67.0	33.0
Jokkmokk	3.0	3,332	46.1	14.3	7.4	4.8	27.3	73.4	26.6
Junosuando	0.5	511	49.9	9.8	19.2	9.0	12.1	62.0	38.0
Karesuando	0.3	320	62.5	10.0	21.3	2.8	3.4	65.9	34.1
Karl Gustav	1.1	1,195	43.9	6.1	7.6	35.6	6.8	50.7	49.3
Kiruna	7.9	8,696	46.7	15.8	9.4	0.2	27.9	74.6	25.4
Korpilombolo	1.3	1,444	54.7	6.0	4.9	7.3	27.1	81.9	19.1
Luleå	10.9	11,963	47.7	15.5	18.7	1.1	17.0	64.7	35.3
Nederkalix	6.7	7,297	59.4	7.2	12.0	11.6	9.9	69.2	30.8
Nederluleå	5.0	5,499	38.6	10.6	19.7	23.7	7.3	46.0	54.0
Nedertorneå	1.5	1,604	41.5	3.7	8.7	23.3	22.9	64.3	35.7
Norrfjärden	2.0	2,228	57.5	5.0	6.2	21.6	9.6	67.1	32.9
Pajala	2.3	2,494	37.3	5.0	19.7	10.0	28.1	65.4	34.6
Piteå city	2.9	3,144	60.9	14.5	17.9	1.2	5.4	66.4	35.6
Piteå rural	6.2	6,807	59.7	5.0	7.3	15.4	12.7	72.4	27.6
Råneå	3.4	3,769	47.3	9.2	12.6	13.1	17.9	65.2	34.8
Tärendö	0.8	824	32.8	7.6	17.5	13.5	28.6	61.4	38.6
Töre	2.1	2,287	56.8	8.0	10.0	12.9	12.3	69.1	30.9
Älvsby	2.5	2,766	49.0	5.9	2.6	13.8	28.7	77.8	22.2
Älvsbyn town	1.3	1,410	47.4	18.6	13.0	7.0	14.0	61.4	38.6
Överkalix	3.3	3,559	56.8	6.3	6.7	12.6	17.6	74.3	25.7
Överluleå	3.8	4,134	49.4	10.5	12.3	14.8	13.1	62.4	37.6
Övertorneå	2.5	2,735	42.8	5.1	14.5	21.0	16.6	59.4	40.6
Postal vote	2.9	3,219	39.7	17.0	31.3	4.3	7.6	47.3	52.6
Total	2.8	109,493	49.3	11.0	13.5	9.0	17.2	66.4	33.6
Source:SCB

==== Skaraborg ====
Location	Share	Votes	S	FP	H	B	K	Left	Right
Amnehärad	1.2	1,541	49.6	28.3	7.8	13.8	0.5	50.1	49.9
Ardala	1.2	1,564	25.2	12.2	19.0	42.1	1.5	26.7	73.3
Binneberg	1.2	1,632	33.2	14.8	15.0	34.1	2.9	36.1	63.8
Dimbo	1.2	1,648	30.3	14.1	18.7	36.1	0.7	31.1	68.9
Essunga	2.6	3,481	17.2	20.3	29.7	32.1	0.7	17.9	82.1
Falköping	5.3	7,061	45.6	31.6	17.2	3.1	2.5	48.1	51.9
Fröjered	1.0	1,274	34.8	17.9	13.7	33.5	0.2	34.9	65.1
Frökind	0.9	1,216	12.8	14.9	29.7	42.3	0.3	13.2	86.8
Fågelås	0.9	1,254	39.5	18.8	20.8	20.0	0.9	40.4	59.6
Grästorp	2.5	3,367	19.4	21.5	23.4	34.7	1.1	20.5	79.5
Gudhem	1.1	1,498	32.4	17.0	18.9	31.2	0.5	32.8	67.2
Götene	2.0	2,680	31.0	35.7	18.7	13.5	1.0	32.0	68.0
Habo	1.7	2,312	29.2	32.9	16.1	20.7	1.1	30.3	69.7
Hasslerör	0.9	1,140	34.0	18.1	20.6	25.7	1.6	35.6	64.4
Hjo	2.0	2,597	41.8	28.0	19.6	8.6	2.0	43.8	56.2
Hova	1.7	2,218	30.1	23.3	21.8	23.8	1.0	31.2	68.8
Husaby	1.6	2,102	29.3	29.9	16.1	23.2	1.5	30.8	69.2
Hökensås	1.3	1,737	32.2	21.2	18.4	26.8	1.3	33.6	66.4
Järpås	0.8	1,035	30.4	19.4	21.5	27.0	1.6	32.1	67.9
Karlsborg	1.6	2,065	46.2	37.2	14.9	0.9	0.8	47.0	53.0
Kinnekulle	1.6	2,178	56.0	24.9	7.8	6.6	4.7	60.7	39.3
Kvänum	1.8	2,405	22.2	18.4	21.4	37.3	0.8	23.0	77.0
Kållands-Råda	0.7	993	35.5	23.7	16.3	22.1	2.4	38.0	62.0
Larv	1.1	1,431	21.6	20.9	26.1	30.8	0.6	22.2	77.8
Lidköping	6.2	8,232	46.7	29.4	12.9	0.4	10.5	57.2	42.8
Levene	1.0	1,349	24.0	17.4	30.0	25.2	3.3	27.4	72.6
Lugnås	0.6	809	28.9	28.4	19.2	22.2	1.2	30.2	69.8
Lyrestad	0.8	1,092	39.2	20.3	17.5	21.0	2.0	41.2	58.8
Mariestad	3.8	5,037	44.7	31.6	17.6	1.0	5.1	49.8	50.2
Moholm	1.6	2,148	37.5	13.3	17.1	30.7	1.4	38.9	61.1
Mullsjö	1.6	2,146	31.1	36.4	16.3	15.3	0.8	32.0	68.0
Mölltorp	1.8	2,331	41.7	18.1	8.3	29.0	2.9	44.6	55.4
Norra Kålland	1.4	1,841	28.1	34.9	9.6	24.7	2.8	30.9	69.1
Ryda	1.6	2,097	16.5	18.7	31.0	33.2	0.5	17.0	83.0
Saleby	0.7	891	13.1	14.4	27.7	44.4	0.3	13.5	86.5
Skara	3.6	4,815	47.2	29.5	18.4	3.2	1.8	49.0	51.0
Skultorp	0.9	1,177	31.7	24.1	15.1	27.4	1.7	33.4	66.6
Skövde	8.1	10,784	43.5	33.1	16.3	2.2	4.9	48.3	51.7
Stenstorp	1.4	1,890	25.9	21.1	21.7	30.7	0.5	26.5	73.5
Tibro	2.6	3,506	40.8	33.9	11.8	10.5	3.0	43.8	56.2
Tidaholm	2.7	3,564	58.6	23.4	9.7	1.0	7.2	65.8	34.2
Tidan	0.9	1,245	41.0	19.8	8.8	28.9	1.5	42.5	57.5
Timmersdala	0.9	1,148	34.0	25.9	23.2	16.4	0.6	34.6	65.4
Tiveden	0.8	1,120	33.5	28.5	18.1	17.3	2.6	36.1	63.9
Tun	0.7	874	29.6	30.7	19.8	19.8	0.1	29.7	70.3
Töreboda	2.2	2,926	33.0	24.4	19.0	21.1	2.5	35.5	64.5
Ullervad	1.1	1,488	25.2	14.0	20.5	38.8	1.5	26.7	73.3
Undenäs	1.5	2,051	50.8	18.7	9.0	20.4	1.1	51.9	48.1
Valle	1.5	1,989	37.2	22.5	17.8	21.1	1.4	38.6	61.4
Vara	1.1	1,430	28.0	33.3	32.9	4.3	1.5	29.5	70.5
Vartofta	1.5	2,035	20.1	12.0	19.9	47.5	0.5	20.6	79.4
Vedum	1.1	1,516	10.6	21.1	29.8	38.1	0.4	11.0	89.0
Vilske	2.2	2,891	16.5	19.2	30.3	32.6	1.4	17.9	82.1
Vinninga	1.2	1,597	33.1	21.0	16.1	28.6	1.3	34.4	65.6
Värsås	1.4	1,818	20.7	16.7	17.1	44.9	0.7	21.4	78.6
Örslösa	1.0	1,318	17.0	22.6	24.4	35.1	1.0	18.0	82.0
Postal vote	2.4	3,201	22.7	31.7	38.2	6.2	1.2	23.9	76.1
Total	3.4	132,875	35.1	25.5	18.6	18.2	2.6	37.7	62.3
Source:SCB

=== Stockholm ===
Stockholm County was divided into Stockholm Municipality and the surrounding county of suburbs or more rural areas.

==== Stockholm (city) ====
Location	Share	Votes	S	FP	H	H	K	Left	Right
Stockholm	100.0	440,116	36.5	35.6	20.9	0.1	6.9	43.4	55.6
Total	11.3	440,116	36.5	35.6	20.9	0.1	6.9	43.4	55.6
Source:SCB

==== Stockholm County ====
Location	Share	Votes	S	FP	H	B	K	Left	Right
Almunge	0.5	1,075	46.5	14.7	11.5	24.3	3.0	49.5	50.5
Blidö	0.2	505	16.8	42.2	29.3	11.1	0.6	17.4	82.6
Boo	1.3	2,770	44.0	31.7	14.6	0.3	9.4	53.4	46.6
Botkyrka	2.0	4,194	54.1	27.9	12.7	0.9	4.3	58.4	41.6
Dalarö	0.3	609	40.7	38.4	12.6	5.7	2.5	43.2	56.8
Danderyd	2.4	4,872	32.8	35.5	26.9	0.8	4.0	36.8	63.2
Djursholm	1.8	3,679	19.2	25.3	53.8	0.4	1.3	20.5	79.5
Djurö	0.3	710	20.3	40.6	33.1	4.4	1.7	22.0	78.0
Ekerö	9.3	1,909	41.6	24.6	18.5	11.9	3.4	45.0	55.0
Frösåker	1.5	3,124	42.7	12.5	12.3	31.1	1.4	44.2	55.8
Frötuna	0.5	1,035	32.9	19.7	25.5	20.4	1.5	34.4	65.6
Färingsö	0.7	1,534	44.0	24.1	12.1	16.3	3.6	47.6	52.4
Grödinge	0.4	883	35.3	29.3	21.7	12.0	1.6	36.9	63.1
Gustavsberg	1.1	2,331	67.3	18.7	4.9	0.6	8.6	75.8	24.2
Huddinge	5.9	12,153	45.9	32.2	10.1	0.7	11.1	57.0	43.0
Häverö	2.0	4,019	55.1	16.5	11.0	11.2	6.2	61.3	38.7
Järfälla	2.7	5,496	51.2	30.8	10.0	0.9	7.2	58.4	41.6
Järna	1.1	2,276	51.3	24.1	13.9	6.5	4.2	55.4	44.6
Knivsta	0.9	1,845	43.3	18.5	15.9	20.5	1.9	45.1	54.9
Knutby	0.8	1,727	41.7	17.9	10.9	27.8	1.6	43.4	56.6
Lidingö	5.8	12,027	27.3	29.9	39.2	0.2	3.3	30.7	69.3
Ljusterö	0.3	558	20.8	25.4	34.4	18.5	0.9	21.7	79.3
Lyhundra	1.2	2,543	32.1	14.6	22.9	29.4	1.0	33.1	66.9
Märsta	1.0	2,085	42.8	23.5	12.4	18.3	3.1	45.9	54.1
Nacka	4.4	9,023	44.0	29.6	19.3	0.2	6.9	50.9	49.1
Norrtälje	2.0	4,046	47.2	26.7	21.2	0.9	4.0	51.1	48.9
Nynäshamn	2.2	4,590	62.1	21.1	8.1	0.0	8.6	70.7	29.3
Roslags-Länna	0.7	1,480	28.8	24.6	21.0	24.9	0.7	29.5	70.5
Salem	0.6	1,244	36.9	24.6	29.1	6.3	3.1	40.0	60.0
Saltsjöbaden	1.2	2,440	35.3	25.2	38.2	0.0	3.1	36.5	64.5
Sigtuna	0.6	1,308	40.4	25.4	26.1	7.2	1.0	41.4	58.6
Sjuhundra	1.4	2,792	49.6	17.1	15.5	15.0	2.8	52.4	47.6
Skepptuna	0.7	1,439	26.9	18.5	12.7	40.5	1.4	28.3	71.7
Sollentuna	5.4	11,121	40.9	35.0	18.5	0.4	5.2	46.1	53.9
Solna	10.8	22,263	38.9	31.9	19.3	0.2	9.6	48.5	51.5
Sorunda	0.7	1,399	44.0	17.4	8.5	25.1	5.1	49.0	51.0
Stocksund	1.3	2,574	16.9	34.0	47.7	0.3	1.1	18.0	82.0
Sundbyberg	6.7	13,843	50.9	29.0	10.7	0.2	9.2	60.1	39.9
Södertälje	7.2	14,731	52.2	25.6	16.1	0.5	5.6	57.8	42.2
Turinge	0.6	1,206	57.4	16.7	13.3	8.5	4.0	61.4	38.6
Tyresö	0.9	1,896	44.8	36.3	9.5	1.3	8.1	52.8	47.2
Täby	3.1	6,450	39.6	34.0	19.0	2.0	5.4	45.0	55.0
Upplands Väsby	1.7	3,429	54.9	25.5	10.9	3.1	5.5	60.5	39.5
Vallentuna	1.1	2,185	38.4	25.6	18.5	13.3	4.2	42.6	57.4
Vaxholm	0.9	1,794	43.5	39.0	15.9	0.2	1.4	44.9	55.1
Väddö	0.7	1,524	35.8	25.3	22.2	14.8	1.8	37.7	62.3
Värmdö	0.5	927	45.1	30.6	15.9	4.7	3.7	48.8	51.2
Västerhaninge	1.0	2,146	42.1	26.4	17.5	9.3	4.7	46.8	53.2
Öregrund	0.4	908	32.8	31.2	24.2	9.6	2.2	35.0	65.0
Ösmo	0.5	1,019	46.4	24.0	10.7	11.8	7.1	53.5	46.5
Össeby	0.5	1,002	38.4	21.1	13.3	23.5	3.8	42.2	57.8
Österhaninge	1.2	2,508	42.3	34.2	11.2	6.7	5.5	47.8	52.2
Östertälje	0.7	1,399	50.7	26.2	15.7	3.5	3.9	54.6	45.4
Österåker	1.1	2,247	40.9	37.0	12.3	6.8	3.0	44.0	56.0
Östhammar	0.4	795	44.3	25.4	26.3	3.1	1.0	45.3	54.7
Postal vote	2.9	6,064	22.5	28.3	46.2	1.6	1.2	23.7	76.2
Total	5.3	205,751	42.3	28.2	19.4	4.5	5.6	47.9	52.1
Source:SCB

=== Södermanland ===
Location	Share	Votes	S	FP	H	B	K	Left	Right
Bettna	1.8	2,182	48.7	15.1	12.0	23.0	1.3	50.0	50.0
Björkvik	1.1	1,321	51.2	13.2	9.5	25.7	0.4	51.6	48.4
Daga	1.7	2,103	38.2	23.1	13.6	24.4	0.6	38.8	61.2
Enhörna	0.4	432	34.0	29.9	15.5	16.7	3.9	38.0	62.0
Eskilstuna	26.1	31,860	60.9	25.6	9.2	0.8	3.5	64.4	35.6
Flen	2.4	2,877	55.3	21.9	17.3	3.6	1.8	57.1	42.9
Floda	1.1	1,324	41.8	20.1	10.2	27.5	0.5	42.2	57.8
Gnesta	1.4	1,763	43.8	22.2	15.3	16.1	2.7	46.5	53.5
Husby-Rekarne	1.6	1,921	57.2	20.6	7.0	13.9	1.4	58.6	41.4
Hällby	1.2	1,489	49.7	22.8	9.5	14.8	3.2	52.9	47.1
Hölö	1.0	1,165	51.9	18.1	9.2	20.6	0.2	52.1	47.9
Julita	1.5	1,853	40.6	25.6	11.4	21.5	0.9	41.5	59.5
Jönåker	2.1	2,564	53.4	15.4	9.8	21.0	0.5	53.9	46.1
Kafjärden	1.4	1,752	32.6	23.7	13.8	29.3	0.7	33.3	66.7
Katrineholm	7.4	9,058	60.8	23.3	12.0	1.4	2.4	63.3	36.7
Malmköping	1.5	1,820	47.2	20.4	16.2	15.1	1.1	48.3	51.7
Mariefred	1.2	1,497	40.4	30.9	19.8	7.7	1.3	41.7	59.3
Mellösa	1.7	2,132	64.0	12.3	9.7	10.9	3.1	67.1	32.9
Nyköping	9.7	11,917	57.8	23.4	15.4	2.2	1.3	59.1	40.9
Oxelösund	2.5	3,063	65.3	19.2	8.2	1.9	5.4	70.7	29.3
Rönö	1.3	1,610	38.9	16.3	11.8	32.4	0.6	39.4	60.6
Sköldinge	1.7	2,076	52.1	18.9	10.4	17.6	1.1	53.2	46.8
Sparreholm	1.4	1,711	48.5	15.5	10.6	23.2	2.2	50.7	49.3
Stallarholmen	1.1	1,311	46.8	17.5	14.0	20.2	1.4	48.2	51.8
Stigtomta	1.1	1,349	51.1	14.9	12.5	20.6	0.9	52.0	48.0
Stora Malm	1.5	1,838	56.6	14.9	7.0	20.7	0.8	57.4	42.6
Strängnäs	3.5	4,233	44.3	30.1	21.6	2.7	1.3	45.5	54.5
Svärta	1.0	1,181	61.2	12.3	8.2	17.2	1.1	62.3	37.7
Torshälla	2.0	2,491	61.3	22.4	9.1	1.6	5.7	67.0	33.0
Tosterö	0.5	584	44.3	17.8	17.1	17.8	2.9	47.3	52.7
Trosa	0.6	739	52.0	23.5	22.2	1.8	0.5	52.5	47.5
Tunaberg	0.9	1,082	65.5	11.7	3.7	15.9	3.1	68.7	31.3
Tystberga	1.4	1,663	43.4	17.6	6.7	31.7	0.7	44.0	56.0
Vagnhärad	1.3	1,566	49.1	19.8	9.6	18.7	2.7	51.9	48.1
Vårfruberga	0.8	1,000	29.9	19.6	15.3	34.8	0.4	30.3	69.7
Västra Vingåker	4.2	5,156	51.1	25.6	9.3	12.4	1.6	52.7	47.3
Västra Rekarne	1.6	1,907	27.9	25.7	8.7	37.3	0.3	28.3	71.7
Åker	1.5	1,847	69.8	12.3	6.2	10.6	1.1	70.9	29.1
Ärla	1.3	1,646	44.5	28.4	10.3	16.5	0.3	44.8	55.2
Postal vote	2.6	3,145	32.5	28.5	34.9	3.4	0.7	33.2	66.8
Total	3.2	122,228	53.8	22.6	12.0	9.5	2.1	55.9	44.1
Source:SCB

=== Uppsala ===
Location	Share	Votes	S	FP	H	B	K	Left	Right
Björklinge	1.3	1,154	38.0	19.2	10.1	31.8	1.0	38.9	61.1
Bälinge	2.3	1,961	28.3	13.6	9.3	46.7	2.1	30.4	69.6
Dannemora	2.6	2,266	55.3	17.0	5.9	12.6	9.2	64.5	35.5
Enköping	6.7	5,775	55.1	23.3	17.7	2.2	1.7	56.8	43.2
Håbo	1.6	1,393	47.4	21.6	14.6	15.4	1.0	48.4	51.6
Hållnäs	1.5	1,257	42.6	33.0	3.8	20.5	0.0	42.6	57.4
Lagunda	1.9	1,592	38.4	13.6	18.7	28.5	0.9	39.3	60.7
Norra Hagunda	1.4	1,223	36.7	16.5	12.3	32.9	1.6	38.3	61.7
Norra Trögd	2.0	1,677	37.3	12.6	15.7	33.8	0.7	38.0	62.0
Oland	3.9	3,351	43.9	12.7	15.2	26.9	1.3	45.3	54.7
Rasbo	1.1	930	37.1	11.0	15.8	35.8	0.3	37.4	62.6
Söderfors	1.7	1,444	81.9	10.8	4.3	1.5	1.5	83.4	16.6
Södra Hagunda	1.0	878	26.2	14.8	22.4	36.1	0.5	26.7	73.3
Södra Trögd	1.4	1,159	31.8	12.1	17.8	38.0	0.3	32.2	67.8
Tierp rural	2.6	2,218	41.8	13.0	7.3	35.3	2.6	44.5	55.5
Tierp town	2.5	2,117	57.0	19.7	14.4	8.3	0.8	57.7	42.3
Upplands-Bro	2.0	1,680	53.2	16.4	17.2	12.5	0.7	53.9	46.1
Uppsala	41.5	35,495	44.9	28.8	21.3	1.1	3.9	48.8	51.2
Vaksala	1.6	1,355	41.8	15.6	14.4	26.3	1.9	43.8	56.2
Vattholma	1.8	1,555	43.3	20.1	9.8	23.5	3.2	46.6	53.4
Vendel	3.1	2,668	50.6	20.8	10.3	17.6	0.8	51.3	48.7
Västland	1.8	1,512	60.9	13.1	3.1	22.6	0.3	61.2	38.8
Åsunda	1.9	1,626	35.6	12.3	15.7	35.6	0.8	36.4	63.6
Älvkarleby	6.0	5,175	78.3	13.9	2.7	1.9	3.2	81.5	18.5
Österlövsta	1.7	1,440	50.5	17.0	10.8	21.5	0.3	50.8	49.2
Postal vote	3.2	2,722	23.2	30.9	42.8	2.4	0.7	23.8	76.0
Total	2.2	85,623	47.2	22.2	16.6	11.4	2.6	49.8	50.2
Source:SCB

=== Värmland ===
Location	Share	Votes	S	FP	H	B	K	Left	Right
Arvika	5.0	7,699	46.8	28.4	12.3	2.2	10.3	57.1	42.9
Brunskog	1.5	2,362	32.1	22.6	23.3	18.9	3.1	35.2	64.8
Ed	1.1	1,698	62.3	13.2	5.5	8.8	10.2	72.5	27.5
Eda	2.1	3,260	61.4	16.1	8.2	7.5	6.8	68.2	31.8
Ekshärad	2.0	3,087	50.5	10.8	10.1	17.6	10.9	61.5	38.5
Filipstad	2.4	3,655	48.6	25.6	17.5	0.5	7.7	56.3	43.7
Finnskoga-Dalby	2.1	3,181	56.3	13.3	10.6	5.0	14.8	71.2	28.8
Forshaga	1.6	2,476	67.0	16.4	7.8	3.1	5.7	72.7	27.3
Frykerud	0.7	1,083	24.5	22.4	18.4	33.6	1.1	25.6	74.4
Fryksände	2.6	4,035	44.6	14.9	18.5	9.1	12.9	57.5	42.5
Gillberga	1.0	1,604	40.8	8.6	17.8	30.4	2.4	43.1	56.9
Glava	0.7	1,142	63.7	11.7	6.1	12.3	6.2	69.9	30.1
Grava	1.0	1,483	46.9	19.9	16.2	12.9	4.1	51.0	49.0
Grums	1.7	2,678	58.6	12.3	8.0	12.2	8.9	67.5	32.5
Gräsmark	0.8	1,230	44.6	14.9	18.8	19.6	2.1	46.7	53.3
Gunnarskog	1.2	1,893	42.8	23.8	19.7	8.4	5.3	48.1	51.9
Gustav Adolf	0.4	641	71.6	8.7	4.4	1.4	13.9	85.5	14.5
Hagfors	2.6	4,040	66.0	9.7	6.9	0.5	17.0	83.0	17.0
Hammarö	3.2	4,856	66.3	13.9	7.1	1.6	11.1	77.4	22.6
Holmedal	1.3	2,030	35.9	22.6	22.8	17.0	1.7	37.6	62.4
Järnskog	1.1	1,623	46.1	16.2	21.3	13.4	3.0	49.0	51.0
Karlstad	12.8	19,652	45.7	25.1	23.7	0.6	4.9	50.6	49.4
Kristinehamn	6.9	10,572	51.7	25.4	15.6	1.3	5.9	57.7	42.3
Kroppa	0.9	1,446	77.0	10.7	4.0	0.3	8.0	85.0	15.0
Köla	0.7	1,042	48.4	12.1	13.8	22.8	2.9	51.2	48.8
Lysvik	1.0	1,520	45.0	11.2	19.6	22.8	1.4	46.4	53.6
Munkfors	2.4	3,646	70.5	11.2	6.9	3.9	7.5	78.0	22.0
Nor	1.7	2,663	59.9	13.4	10.0	9.3	7.4	67.3	32.7
Norra Ny	1.0	1,591	42.7	15.5	22.9	9.2	9.7	52.5	47.5
Norra Råda	2.1	3,221	57.5	13.3	8.7	4.8	15.8	73.2	26.8
Nyed	2.2	3,407	44.1	16.2	13.0	24.0	2.8	46.9	53.1
Rämmen	1.2	1,813	74.8	13.0	4.0	0.6	7.6	82.4	17.6
Sillerud	0.6	849	34.4	14.8	22.7	22.6	5.4	39.8	60.2
Stavnäs	1.1	1,747	35.8	21.4	20.2	20.3	2.3	38.1	61.9
Stora Kil	1.5	2,340	44.8	21.7	13.7	14.6	5.2	50.0	50.0
Stora Sunne	3.3	5,043	40.2	12.7	15.4	29.9	1.9	42.0	58.0
Storfors	1.4	2,082	79.1	11.2	4.8	0.7	4.2	83.3	16.7
Sunne	1.1	1,674	41.9	28.3	26.6	1.4	1.8	43.7	56.3
Svanskog	0.9	1,363	42.6	11.7	25.5	15.6	4.6	47.2	52.8
Säffle	3.4	5,185	44.1	27.6	14.0	6.6	7.7	51.8	48.2
Töcksmark	0.9	1,430	35.0	29.4	25.0	8.6	1.9	36.9	63.1
Ullerud	2.0	3,070	60.1	11.2	7.3	12.7	8.7	68.8	31.2
Ullvättern	0.8	1,206	45.2	15.6	16.7	20.3	2.2	47.3	52.7
Visnum	2.1	3,198	47.3	13.8	12.8	20.3	5.8	53.1	46.9
Vitsand	0.7	1,147	38.8	10.5	7.6	5.9	37.2	76.0	24.0
Värmlandsberg	1.7	2,676	64.6	13.0	8.6	5.8	8.0	72.6	27.4
Värmlandsnäs	1.1	1,708	26.3	12.4	14.8	45.0	1.6	27.9	72.1
Väse	1.5	2,313	34.2	16.9	14.4	33.4	1.1	35.4	64.6
Årjäng	0.9	1,312	34.7	26.2	27.1	10.2	1.8	36.5	63.5
Älgå	0.9	1,344	52.7	14.8	14.1	8.8	9.6	62.3	37.7
Östmark	0.9	1,380	44.4	10.9	29.1	8.0	7.5	52.0	48.0
Östra Fågelvik	0.8	1,177	51.9	15.0	13.3	17.2	2.5	54.5	45.5
Postal vote	3.0	4,606	37.2	24.7	32.6	3.2	2.3	39.6	60.4
Total	3.9	153,179	50.0	18.6	15.4	9.1	6.9	56.9	43.1
Source:SCB

=== Västerbotten ===
Location	Share	Votes	S	FP	H	B	K	Left	Right
Bjurholm	2.2	2,580	34.0	32.6	18.3	14.0	1.2	35.2	64.8
Bureå	2.4	2,787	56.8	18.1	13.6	9.0	2.5	59.3	40.7
Burträsk	3.7	4,354	32.6	24.0	18.8	23.8	0.7	33.3	66.7
Bygdeå	3.0	3,500	40.8	25.2	5.6	27.8	0.6	41.4	58.6
Byske	3.1	3,676	45.1	19.1	17.8	16.1	1.9	47.0	53.0
Degerfors	4.5	5,251	40.4	33.8	13.6	11.0	1.1	41.6	58.4
Dorotea	2.2	2,634	65.1	18.1	5.0	8.5	3.2	68.3	31.7
Fredrika	0.7	830	58.6	21.1	8.1	11.2	1.1	59.6	40.4
Holmsund	2.7	3,127	71.3	18.7	2.9	0.1	6.9	78.3	21.7
Holmön	0.1	134	32.8	41.0	26.1	0.0	0.0	32.8	67.2
Hörnefors	1.7	1,988	68.8	17.8	5.2	6.6	1.6	70.4	29.6
Jörn	2.0	2,292	54.3	19.6	13.0	10.5	2.6	56.9	43.1
Lycksele city	1.6	1,925	48.0	30.6	19.4	0.1	1.9	49.9	50.1
Lycksele rural	4.1	4,754	48.3	34.4	10.9	2.9	3.5	51.8	48.2
Lövånger	1.8	2,097	19.4	26.3	31.4	22.1	0.8	20.2	79.8
Malå	2.0	2,390	53.1	28.4	8.0	5.1	5.4	58.5	41.5
Nordmaling	4.6	5,351	45.2	21.6	14.6	18.1	0.5	45.7	54.3
Norsjö	2.8	3,279	41.2	31.1	13.1	9.2	5.4	46.5	53.5
Nysätra	1.6	1,844	26.7	29.9	16.9	26.4	0.1	26.8	73.2
Skellefteå city	9.0	10,504	58.4	19.5	16.0	0.9	5.2	63.6	36.4
Skellefteå rural	8.0	9,347	46.0	16.5	17.6	17.2	2.7	48.7	51.3
Sorsele	2.3	2,718	43.7	39.6	7.3	1.8	7.7	51.3	48.7
Stensele	3.2	3,767	46.9	35.3	10.2	1.9	5.7	52.6	47.4
Sävar	1.4	1,689	27.8	30.0	17.5	24.5	0.2	28.1	71.9
Tärna	0.7	863	34.5	47.9	14.3	2.3	1.0	35.6	64.4
Umeå city	8.0	9,390	45.6	33.4	18.5	1.2	1.4	47.0	53.0
Umeå rural	7.3	8,567	35.8	29.1	14.2	19.4	1.5	37.2	62.8
Vilhelmina rural	3.2	3,705	53.8	28.7	4.4	10.2	3.0	56.7	43.3
Vilhelmina town	0.9	1,040	48.0	35.0	11.9	1.6	3.5	51.4	48.6
Vännäs rural	2.2	2,549	25.1	27.9	17.2	28.6	1.3	26.4	73.8
Vännäs town	1.3	1,544	64.8	21.7	10.6	1.0	1.9	66.6	33.4
Åsele	2.4	2,830	54.8	26.4	6.7	10.8	1.2	56.0	44.0
Örträsk	0.5	578	43.9	22.3	12.3	19.9	1.6	45.5	54.5
Postal vote	2.8	3,319	39.9	28.7	27.3	2.8	1.3	41.1	58.8
Total	3.0	117,203	46.2	26.3	14.1	10.8	2.6	48.7	51.3
Source:SCB

=== Västernorrland ===
Location	Share	Votes	S	FP	H	B	K	Left	Right
Alnö	1.8	2,760	63.7	14.9	2.6	7.2	11.6	75.3	24.7
Anundsjö	3.3	5,006	45.1	21.6	6.3	24.0	3.0	48.1	51.9
Arnäs	1.7	2,649	44.5	24.6	8.0	15.8	7.1	51.6	48.4
Attmar	0.9	1,306	44.6	15.6	3.7	33.5	2.6	47.2	52.8
Bjärtrå	1.5	2,250	60.9	12.3	4.4	12.4	9.9	70.8	29.2
Björna	1.0	1,581	40.5	31.4	6.1	16.6	5.4	45.9	54.1
Borgsjö	1.4	2,103	51.2	15.5	8.7	14.2	10.4	61.6	38.4
Boteå	1.3	1,955	56.9	6.9	6.0	23.2	7.0	63.9	36.1
Fjällsjö	1.3	2,044	53.9	9.3	7.7	18.6	10.5	64.4	35.6
Gideå	0.8	1,180	37.2	28.9	6.7	26.1	1.1	38.3	61.7
Grundsunda	1.4	2,193	56.8	18.9	5.9	14.0	4.4	61.2	38.8
Haverö	0.8	1,179	59.0	15.9	3.1	7.5	14.6	73.6	26.4
Helgum	0.8	1,230	58.0	5.0	6.3	26.8	3.9	61.9	39.1
Härnösand	5.3	8,035	44.2	31.1	19.4	1.3	4.1	48.2	51.8
Hässjö	2.1	3,219	49.1	18.5	8.6	16.6	7.2	56.3	43.7
Högsjö	1.3	2,016	64.0	11.4	4.9	9.0	10.8	74.8	25.2
Indals-Liden	1.7	2,550	48.2	18.5	11.1	18.6	3.7	51.8	48.2
Junsele	1.3	1,897	53.1	9.9	8.4	14.5	14.1	67.2	32.8
Kramfors	5.1	7,660	57.1	11.8	4.3	3.6	23.2	80.3	19.7
Långsele	1.9	2,814	65.9	9.1	5.6	10.1	9.4	75.3	24.7
Mo	0.6	894	39.9	25.1	10.7	21.8	2.5	42.4	57.6
Njurunda	4.3	6,471	56.8	17.0	3.9	6.8	15.4	72.2	27.8
Noraström	1.3	1,956	36.9	12.2	10.5	31.9	8.5	45.4	54.6
Nordingrå	1.1	1,731	41.4	13.8	11.7	32.8	0.3	41.7	58.3
Nätra	2.8	4,290	54.7	19.2	6.0	16.5	3.6	58.3	41.7
Ramsele	2.2	3,257	57.7	7.4	8.3	19.8	6.6	64.4	35.5
Resele	1.2	1,761	58.7	7.0	3.7	23.6	7.0	65.8	34.2
Selånger	1.8	2,797	44.5	21.5	8.9	21.4	3.6	48.1	51.9
Själevad	5.6	8,535	59.9	20.2	6.2	7.5	6.3	66.2	33.8
Skön	4.4	6,687	58.6	21.2	8.9	3.2	8.1	66.7	33.3
Sollefteå	3.1	4,745	52.7	18.2	17.2	9.6	2.3	54.9	45.1
Stöde	1.4	2,061	45.3	22.2	5.6	19.2	7.6	52.9	47.1
Sundsvall	9.2	13,995	43.6	34.2	15.7	1.5	5.1	48.7	51.3
Säbrå	2.6	3,980	47.0	15.7	9.8	23.4	4.0	51.0	49.0
Timrå	3.6	5,450	69.8	14.4	4.2	2.6	9.0	78.8	21.2
Torp	2.8	4,244	51.2	18.0	7.8	13.5	9.5	60.7	39.3
Trehörningsjö	0.5	716	35.5	26.1	11.6	16.6	1.3	36.7	63.3
Tuna	1.6	2,433	51.8	19.4	5.1	15.2	8.5	60.3	39.7
Tåsjö	1.3	1,971	60.8	7.9	5.0	17.7	8.6	69.4	30.6
Ullånger	1.2	1,794	37.9	15.7	9.8	35.3	1.3	39.2	60.8
Ytterlännäs	3.1	4,650	58.9	11.1	7.7	12.3	10.0	68.9	31.1
Ådalaliden	1.1	1,695	62.1	9.3	6.6	14.3	7.7	69.8	30.2
Ånge	1.1	1,623	57.1	22.9	11.6	1.9	6.5	63.6	36.4
Örnsköldsvik	2.5	3,788	41.5	35.3	18.0	1.5	3.7	45.2	54.8
Postal vote	2.8	4,292	38.3	26.1	28.5	4.6	2.6	40.8	59.1
Total	3.9	151,443	52.0	19.5	9.5	11.5	7.5	59.5	40.5
Source:SCB

=== Västmanland ===
Location	Share	Votes	S	FP	H	B	K	Left	Right
Arboga	4.9	5,429	58.4	22.8	12.2	1.8	4.9	63.3	36.7
Dingtuna	0.8	890	40.4	17.3	8.0	34.2	0.1	40.6	59.4
Fagersta	6.2	6,880	67.1	18.4	7.5	2.0	5.1	72.1	27.9
Fjärdhundra	1.9	2,084	28.8	17.0	14.5	39.0	0.7	29.5	70.5
Hallstahammar	4.4	4,889	67.8	13.2	6.4	5.4	7.1	75.0	25.0
Kolbäck	2.2	2,390	58.8	19.5	8.4	10.4	2.9	61.7	39.3
Kolsva	2.1	2,323	69.2	8.3	6.2	9.6	6.6	75.9	24.1
Kung Karl	1.3	1,385	39.5	18.8	8.7	30.5	2.6	42.1	57.9
Kungsåra	1.0	1,067	44.7	15.1	15.2	24.5	0.6	45.3	54.7
Kungsör	2.2	2,394	58.7	24.7	7.7	1.5	7.4	66.0	34.0
Köping	6.7	7,357	60.5	20.6	10.3	3.3	5.3	65.8	34.2
Medåker	1.3	1,477	34.5	18.7	6.6	39.1	1.2	35.6	64.4
Munktorp	1.3	1,410	28.8	15.4	6.2	48.9	0.8	29.6	70.4
Möklinta	1.0	1,082	32.5	15.8	9.1	41.7	0.8	33.4	66.6
Nora	1.5	1,612	43.5	24.0	9.2	21.2	2.1	45.7	54.3
Norberg	2.6	2,899	70.5	13.9	7.6	2.9	5.1	75.6	24.4
Ramnäs	1.9	2,131	73.3	11.4	7.2	6.1	2.0	75.4	24.6
Sala	5.0	5,568	51.3	23.0	14.9	7.6	3.3	54.6	45.4
Skinnskatteberg	2.7	2,974	66.7	14.3	5.0	9.5	4.4	71.1	28.9
Skultuna	2.0	2,223	58.5	12.1	6.0	22.1	1.3	59.7	40.3
Sura	3.0	3,266	71.1	11.6	5.0	3.6	8.7	79.7	20.3
Tillberga	1.6	1,791	57.5	15.5	7.0	17.2	2.7	60.2	39.8
Tärna	1.8	2,038	26.1	14.9	10.2	48.2	0.7	26.8	73.2
Vittinge	1.2	1,326	54.3	13.6	5.2	14.7	12.2	66.5	33.5
Västerfärnebo	2.3	2,589	33.9	19.9	9.0	35.8	1.4	35.3	64.7
Västerlövsta	2.6	2,855	44.6	16.7	9.5	23.1	6.2	50.8	49.2
Västerås	30.1	33,216	55.9	25.7	12.7	1.2	4.5	60.4	39.6
Östervåla	1.9	2,104	38.0	20.2	10.6	30.1	1.1	39.1	60.9
Postal vote	2.6	2,837	34.3	31.0	30.6	2.7	1.3	35.7	64.3
Total	2.8	110,486	55.0	20.4	10.6	9.8	4.2	59.3	40.7
Source:SCB

=== Älvsborg ===
==== Älvsborg N ====
Location	Share	Votes	S	FP	H	B	K	Left	Right
Alingsås	8.4	8,844	44.8	38.4	11.9	1.6	3.3	48.1	51.9
Angered	1.1	1,210	53.1	25.6	5.5	5.5	10.3	63.5	36.5
Bengtsfors	1.5	1,627	53.0	35.5	8.8	1.4	1.3	54.3	45.7
Bjärke	2.8	2,908	21.0	38.0	16.8	23.1	1.2	22.2	77.8
Bolstad	1.4	1,472	11.1	12.1	15.8	60.9	0.1	11.3	88.7
Brålanda	2.0	2,095	11.9	13.6	22.9	51.5	0.1	12.1	87.9
Bäckefors	0.8	844	42.7	26.7	11.1	18.8	0.7	43.4	56.6
Dals-Ed	2.7	2,819	27.5	26.9	16.7	28.0	0.9	28.4	71.6
Flundre	1.9	2,034	53.6	12.9	4.6	24.7	4.2	57.8	42.2
Frändefors	1.5	1,541	12.3	20.0	22.6	44.6	0.5	12.8	87.2
Färgelanda	1.4	1,461	50.4	12.3	14.2	22.5	0.6	51.0	49.0
Gäsene	3.2	3,320	18.8	19.8	34.5	26.4	0.4	19.2	80.8
Hemsjö	1.0	1,009	25.3	36.3	25.7	12.0	0.8	26.1	73.9
Herrljunga	2.2	2,316	30.1	33.2	16.6	18.5	1.6	31.7	68.3
Högsäter	1.7	1,784	12.4	12.7	15.2	59.4	0.3	12.8	87.2
Kroppefjäll	1.5	1,604	20.4	18.8	19.1	41.2	0.5	20.9	79.1
Lelång	1.8	1,897	34.0	19.9	12.7	30.9	2.5	36.5	63.5
Lerum	3.4	3,630	35.5	39.6	17.4	3.2	4.2	39.7	60.3
Lilla Edet	1.6	1,662	66.5	20.9	5.8	1.0	5.8	72.3	27.7
Lödöse	1.3	1,343	39.8	18.5	11.0	28.1	2.6	42.4	57.6
Mellerud	2.1	2,195	38.7	26.5	15.5	18.1	1.2	39.9	60.1
Nödinge	2.6	2,749	66.6	22.6	2.9	3.1	4.8	71.4	28.6
Skallsjö	1.5	1,555	51.5	32.8	8.7	0.6	6.3	57.8	42.2
Skepplanda	1.0	1,043	22.4	17.3	16.0	42.5	1.8	24.3	75.7
Skållered	1.4	1,433	65.9	23.8	3.1	6.6	0.6	66.5	33.5
Starrkärr	2.7	2,814	44.5	25.3	8.5	15.7	6.0	50.5	49.5
Steneby	2.5	2,610	61.8	23.0	6.2	6.1	2.9	64.7	35.3
Stora Lundby	2.1	2,174	24.0	36.5	15.9	20.8	2.8	26.8	73.2
Södra Väne	1.7	1,774	37.3	23.5	12.8	24.3	2.1	39.4	60.6
Trollhättan	13.8	14,512	58.3	29.4	6.7	0.9	4.7	63.0	37.0
Tössbo	2.5	2,679	34.2	21.0	15.2	25.7	3.9	38.1	61.9
Vårgårda	4.2	4,470	21.7	32.8	25.0	20.3	0.2	21.9	78.1
Vänersborg	8.3	8,770	45.6	35.0	14.5	3.2	1.7	47.3	52.7
Västra Tunhem	2.8	2,917	58.5	22.8	5.7	7.4	5.6	64.0	36.0
Åmål	4.3	4,515	52.7	30.6	13.6	0.6	2.5	55.2	44.8
Ödeborg	1.0	1,007	48.6	10.9	13.7	26.3	0.5	49.1	50.9
Postal vote	2.5	2,641	30.5	35.7	28.1	5.3	0.3	30.8	69.1
Total	2.7	105,278	41.6	28.1	13.6	14.0	2.7	44.3	55.7
Source:SCB

==== Älvsborg S ====
Location	Share	Votes	S	FP	H	B	K	Left	Right
Axelfors	1.1	1,092	26.9	7.9	27.3	37.7	0.2	27.1	72.9
Björketorp	1.3	1,256	35.3	21.7	25.8	15.2	2.0	37.3	62.7
Bollebygd	2.7	2,597	37.6	17.1	32.0	11.4	2.0	39.6	60.4
Borås	33.7	32,347	46.1	20.0	26.8	0.8	6.3	52.4	47.6
Brämhult	1.0	950	29.2	19.9	41.6	5.6	3.8	32.9	67.1
Dalstorp	1.7	1,631	20.1	13.3	27.5	38.7	0.3	20.4	79.6
Fristad	3.0	2,848	23.7	21.9	34.9	16.1	3.4	27.1	72.9
Fritsla	1.9	1,839	58.1	9.7	18.9	5.4	8.0	66.1	33.9
Horred	1.5	1,406	25.8	9.2	36.4	28.5	0.1	25.9	74.1
Högvad	1.4	1,309	29.3	15.7	29.2	25.4	0.4	29.7	70.3
Hökerum	2.1	2,014	14.0	13.9	35.8	35.5	0.8	14.8	85.2
Kindaholm	1.6	1,513	28.8	9.9	25.4	35.3	0.6	29.3	70.7
Kinna	3.3	3,174	56.6	16.1	19.6	1.9	5.8	62.4	37.6
Kinnarumma	1.9	1,839	70.7	4.2	12.6	9.3	3.2	73.9	26.1
Kungsäter	1.0	946	19.6	6.9	38.3	34.8	0.5	20.1	79.9
Limmared	0.8	761	67.5	16.4	7.6	4.6	3.8	71.4	28.6
Lysjö	1.5	1,492	29.2	11.3	36.6	21.6	1.3	30.5	69.5
Länghem	1.5	1,405	30.0	12.2	30.4	26.8	0.6	30.6	69.4
Redväg	4.5	4,325	16.8	24.8	27.4	30.6	0.4	17.2	82.8
Sandhult	3.3	3,127	33.7	15.9	33.6	12.5	4.2	38.0	62.0
Seglora	1.4	1,339	63.9	6.1	17.0	11.1	1.9	65.8	34.2
Skene	2.4	2,271	58.8	14.4	13.2	2.8	10.8	69.7	30.3
Svansjö	1.6	1,504	15.1	5.9	36.0	42.6	0.5	15.6	84.4
Svenljunga	1.5	1,395	44.9	14.8	28.0	10.1	2.2	47.1	52.9
Sätila	1.9	1,873	25.4	9.1	39.0	25.9	0.6	26.1	73.9
Toarp	3.8	3,632	43.7	14.8	26.9	13.2	1.4	45.1	54.9
Tranemo	2.8	2,692	38.6	13.7	21.6	25.4	0.7	39.3	60.7
Ulricehamn	4.5	4,351	40.6	28.1	25.7	4.1	1.6	42.1	57.9
Västra Mark	2.1	2,012	26.5	9.4	31.7	31.9	0.4	27.0	73.0
Åsunden	3.0	2,901	32.6	13.3	27.0	26.8	0.3	32.9	67.1
Örby	1.8	1,766	57.2	11.0	24.2	3.7	3.9	61.1	38.9
Postal vote	2.6	2,474	26.6	25.1	44.1	3.2	1.0	27.6	72.4
Total	2.5	96,081	39.5	17.0	27.7	12.2	3.6	43.1	56.9
Source:SCB

=== Örebro ===
Location	Share	Votes	S	FP	H	B	K	Left	Right
Asker	1.8	2,497	40.3	23.4	8.0	26.9	1.3	41.6	58.4
Askersund	1.7	2,244	46.4	21.4	15.1	16.3	0.9	47.3	52.7
Axberg	2.1	2,837	34.2	24.6	19.8	19.1	2.2	36.4	63.6
Degerfors	3.4	4,683	62.9	14.9	6.4	3.8	12.0	74.8	25.2
Ekeby-Gällersta	0.9	1,227	38.6	25.7	15.4	18.6	1.7	40.3	59.7
Fellingsbro	2.1	2,795	41.4	20.9	10.5	26.3	0.9	42.3	57.7
Frövi	1.1	1,430	55.5	16.2	13.8	11.7	2.8	58.3	41.7
Glanshammar	1.7	2,349	31.1	22.1	16.6	29.0	1.1	32.2	67.8
Grythyttan	1.0	1,340	61.4	17.2	8.5	4.2	8.7	70.1	29.9
Hallsberg rural	0.7	898	49.6	19.7	9.7	12.1	8.9	58.5	41.5
Hallsberg town	1.9	2,616	64.5	19.8	9.0	1.0	5.7	70.2	29.8
Hammar	1.6	2,218	62.3	15.6	6.5	13.1	2.4	64.7	35.3
Hällefors	2.6	3,496	67.3	13.2	5.5	0.5	13.6	80.9	19.1
Karlskoga	12.4	16,847	54.1	21.8	10.1	3.7	10.2	64.3	35.7
Kopparberg	1.0	1,353	59.9	22.3	11.4	2.0	4.4	64.3	35.7
Kumla rural	2.0	2,773	45.5	19.6	10.3	20.3	4.3	49.8	50.2
Kumla town	3.8	5,181	51.8	28.4	9.7	0.9	9.2	61.0	39.0
Laxå	1.7	2,282	64.4	20.8	3.2	1.3	10.3	74.7	25.3
Lekeberg	1.9	2,623	37.8	22.8	14.6	23.4	1.4	39.2	60.8
Lerbäck	1.8	2,489	44.7	21.8	10.7	20.2	2.7	47.4	52.6
Linde	3.0	4,019	50.4	15.8	9.3	20.6	3.8	54.2	45.8
Lindesberg	2.3	3,067	45.9	30.2	17.0	2.4	4.4	50.3	49.7
Ljusnarsberg	2.4	3,315	63.5	13.7	4.8	9.9	8.1	71.6	28.4
Mosjö	0.7	984	40.3	26.4	12.2	18.4	2.6	43.0	57.0
Nora	1.4	1,862	45.9	27.2	20.6	0.9	5.5	51.4	48.6
Noraskog	2.7	3,626	56.7	16.8	7.4	12.9	6.2	62.8	37.2
Ramsberg	1.1	1,467	51.2	18.3	6.6	21.8	2.1	53.3	46.7
Sköllersta	2.1	2,830	41.5	22.5	12.9	20.9	2.2	43.7	56.3
Stora Mellösa	1.2	1,607	29.3	28.5	15.6	26.0	0.6	29.9	70.1
Svartå	2.4	3,217	48.5	20.7	9.3	16.4	5.0	53.5	46.5
Tysslinge	1.4	1,962	50.7	18.2	9.9	17.9	3.2	53.9	46.1
Viby	1.5	1,977	49.2	24.6	8.5	14.2	3.5	52.7	47.3
Örebro	28.0	38,004	50.8	29.7	13.5	0.9	5.1	55.9	44.1
Postal vote	2.7	3,716	32.0	32.3	32.0	2.2	1.4	33.4	66.5
Total	3.5	135,831	50.5	23.7	11.9	8.3	5.6	56.1	43.9
Source:SCB

=== Östergötland ===
Location	Share	Votes	S	FP	H	B	K	Left	Right
Alvastra	0.8	1,461	46.2	12.0	14.7	25.0	2.1	48.3	51.7
Aska	0.8	1,565	39.4	14.9	13.7	27.9	4.0	43.5	56.5
Askeby	0.7	1,434	39.6	14.7	16.5	27.4	1.7	41.4	58.6
Aspveden	0.6	1,159	42.2	9.4	14.0	33.7	0.7	42.9	57.1
Björsäter	0.8	1,516	48.8	10.2	16.4	23.9	0.8	49.6	50.4
Boberg	1.0	1,942	46.5	15.1	14.6	22.1	1.7	48.2	51.8
Borensberg	1.2	2,264	47.2	18.9	14.9	12.9	6.1	53.3	46.7
Boxholm	1.3	2,515	64.9	9.5	9.1	4.9	11.7	76.5	23.5
Finspång	3.9	7,545	70.7	11.3	11.8	3.7	2.5	73.2	26.8
Folkunga	0.9	1,693	39.6	13.9	14.0	29.9	2.5	42.1	57.9
Godegård	0.7	1,383	42.4	21.4	14.4	20.1	1.7	44.1	55.9
Gryt	0.4	772	37.7	17.6	16.5	27.7	0.5	38.2	61.8
Hällestad	1.1	2,166	53.1	11.9	11.8	19.7	3.5	56.6	43.4
Hävla	1.0	1,892	45.8	19.6	15.4	17.8	1.4	47.2	52.8
Kolmården	0.8	1,468	58.9	16.2	13.4	8.7	2.8	61.7	39.3
Kvillinge	1.5	2,887	62.6	15.0	13.9	5.0	3.6	66.2	33.8
Kärna	1.1	2,082	53.7	18.8	15.2	9.8	2.4	56.1	43.9
Landeryd	0.5	906	56.8	15.1	15.1	9.5	3.4	60.3	39.7
Linköping	16.3	31,659	49.2	24.4	19.7	0.9	5.8	55.1	44.9
Mjölby	2.8	5,431	58.0	20.0	15.0	4.8	2.2	60.3	39.7
Motala	7.0	13,651	56.1	22.3	13.7	1.2	6.6	62.8	37.2
Norsholm	0.8	1,562	56.8	12.2	15.8	14.1	1.1	57.9	42.1
Norra Kinda	1.1	2,146	41.2	14.2	19.2	24.1	1.2	42.4	57.6
Norra Valkebo	0.9	1,804	47.2	12.9	18.7	20.4	1.6	47.9	52.1
Norrköping	24.8	48,091	53.3	19.0	22.1	0.9	4.7	58.0	42.0
Ringarum	1.2	2,380	50.6	8.5	18.2	19.5	3.2	53.9	46.1
Skänninge	1.1	2,079	45.6	18.7	21.1	11.4	3.3	48.9	51.1
Skärblacka	1.4	2,767	66.1	10.0	9.4	10.0	4.3	70.5	29.5
Stegeborg	0.6	1,238	30.0	11.3	20.0	37.6	1.1	31.1	68.9
Söderköping	1.5	2,872	43.3	13.6	29.2	13.0	0.9	44.2	55.8
Södra Göstring	0.5	1,008	37.4	11.4	15.6	31.5	4.1	41.5	58.5
Södra Kinda	0.8	1,549	38.3	7.6	14.5	38.7	0.8	39.1	60.9
Södra Valkebo	0.8	1,542	39.3	13.1	15.3	31.4	1.0	40.3	59.7
Tjällmo	0.5	991	48.7	11.3	14.1	24.9	0.9	49.6	50.4
Vadstena	1.2	2,326	48.7	22.6	23.2	4.2	1.4	50.0	50.0
Valdemarsvik	1.0	1,976	61.5	14.7	18.6	1.6	3.5	65.0	35.0
Vifolka	1.2	2,375	43.6	15.6	14.5	23.0	3.3	46.9	53.1
Västra Vikbolandet	0.9	1,670	39.4	8.7	20.9	29.8	1.1	40.5	59.5
Vreta Kloster	1.8	3,464	55.4	12.4	11.8	15.6	4.8	60.1	39.9
Vårdnäs	1.0	1,878	39.0	17.3	19.0	24.0	0.7	39.8	60.2
Västra Kinda	1.6	3,127	42.8	15.6	21.6	18.5	1.5	44.3	55.7
Ydre	1.6	3,101	30.6	25.3	16.3	26.0	1.8	32.4	67.6
Åkerbo	0.9	1,698	35.6	15.5	21.8	26.1	1.0	36.6	63.4
Åtvidaberg	2.0	3,936	70.2	13.7	7.5	5.7	2.8	73.1	26.9
Ödeshög	1.2	2,348	37.1	21.9	15.2	24.6	1.1	38.2	61.8
Östra Vikbolandet	1.1	2,041	29.2	13.8	19.7	36.7	0.7	29.8	70.2
Östgöta-Dal	0.7	1,423	49.8	10.1	14.5	23.3	2.2	52.0	48.0
Postal vote	2.7	5,257	28.4	24.6	42.0	4.0	0.9	29.4	70.6
Total	5.0	194,040	50.6	18.2	18.5	8.8	3.9	54.5	45.5
Source:SCB
