= 1976 Women's Nordic Football Championship =

Tournament details
- Host country: Sweden
- Dates: 9 July – 11 July 1976
- Teams: 3
- Venue: 3 (in 3 host cities)

Final positions
- Champions: Denmark (3rd title)

Tournament statistics
- Matches played: 3
- Goals scored: 7 (2.33 per match)
- Attendance: 3,810 (1,270 per match)
- Top scorer: (Sweden) Ann Jansson (2 goals)

1976 Women's Nordic Football Championship was the third edition of the Women's Nordic Football Championship tournament. It was held from 9 July to 11 July in Borås, Fristad and Öxabäck in Sweden.

== Standings ==
Team	Pld	W	D	L	GF	GA	GD	Pts
Denmark	2	2	0	0	2	0	+2	4
Sweden	2	1	0	1	4	2	+2	2
Finland	2	0	0	2	1	5	−4	0

== Results ==
9 July 1976
19:00

Denmark	1–0	Finland
Frederiksen 40'	Report

Hedens idrottsplats, Fristad
Attendance: 430
Referee: Bo-Lennart Johansson, Sweden

10 July 1976

Finland	1–4	Sweden
Hartikka 48'	Report	M. Åhman 23'; Jansson 36' 49'; K. Åhman 59'

Hagavallen, Öxabäck
Attendance: 1,380
Referee: Kjell Johansson, Sweden

11 July 1976
18:00

Denmark	1–0	Sweden
Holst 35'	Report

Ryavallen, Borås
Attendance: 2,000
Referee: Ingemar Johansson, Sweden

== Goalscorers ==
2 goals

- (Sweden) Ann Jansson

1 goal

- (Denmark) Annette Frederiksen
- (Finland) Marketta Hartikka
- (Denmark) Anne Grete Holst
- (Sweden) Karin Åhman
- (Sweden) Mona Åhman

== Sources ==
- Nordic Championships (Women) 1976 Rec.Sport.Soccer Statistics Foundation
- Landsholdsdatabasen Danish Football Association
- Lautela, Yrjö & Wallén, Göran: Rakas jalkapallo — Sata vuotta suomalaista jalkapalloa, p. 418. Football Association of Finland / Teos Publishing 2007. ISBN 978-951-851-068-3.
