= Ulrika, Sweden =

Ulrika
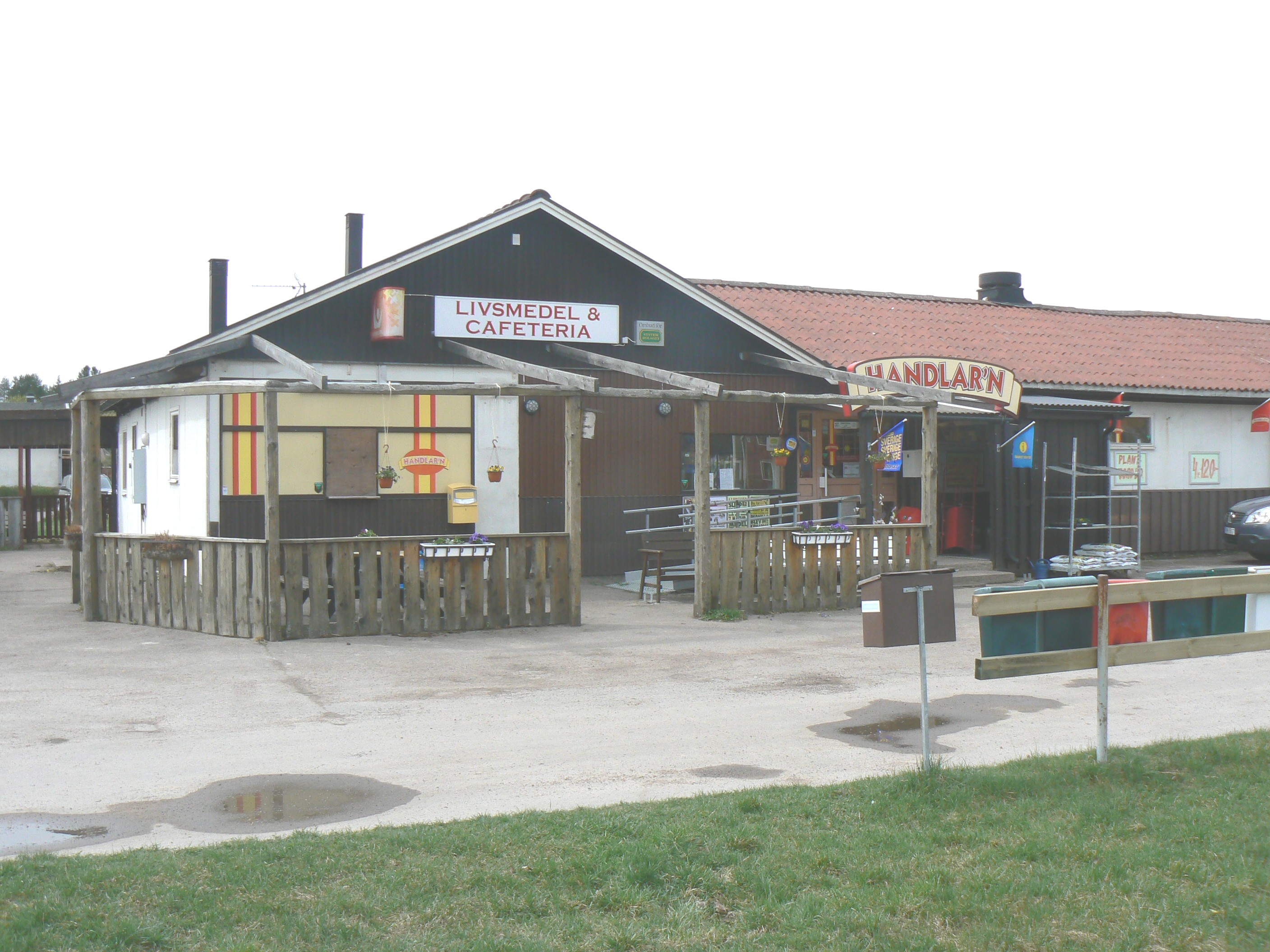
- Ulrika

- Location within Östergötland Location within Sweden
- Coordinates: 58°07′30″N 15°25′48″E
- Country: Sweden
- Province: Östergötland
- County: Östergötland County
- Municipality: Linköping Municipality

Area
  - Total: 0.37 km^{2} (0.14 sq mi)

Population (31 December 2010)
  - Total: 200
  - Density: 542/km^{2} (1,400/sq mi)
- Time zone: UTC+1 (CET)
  - Summer (DST): UTC+2 (CEST)

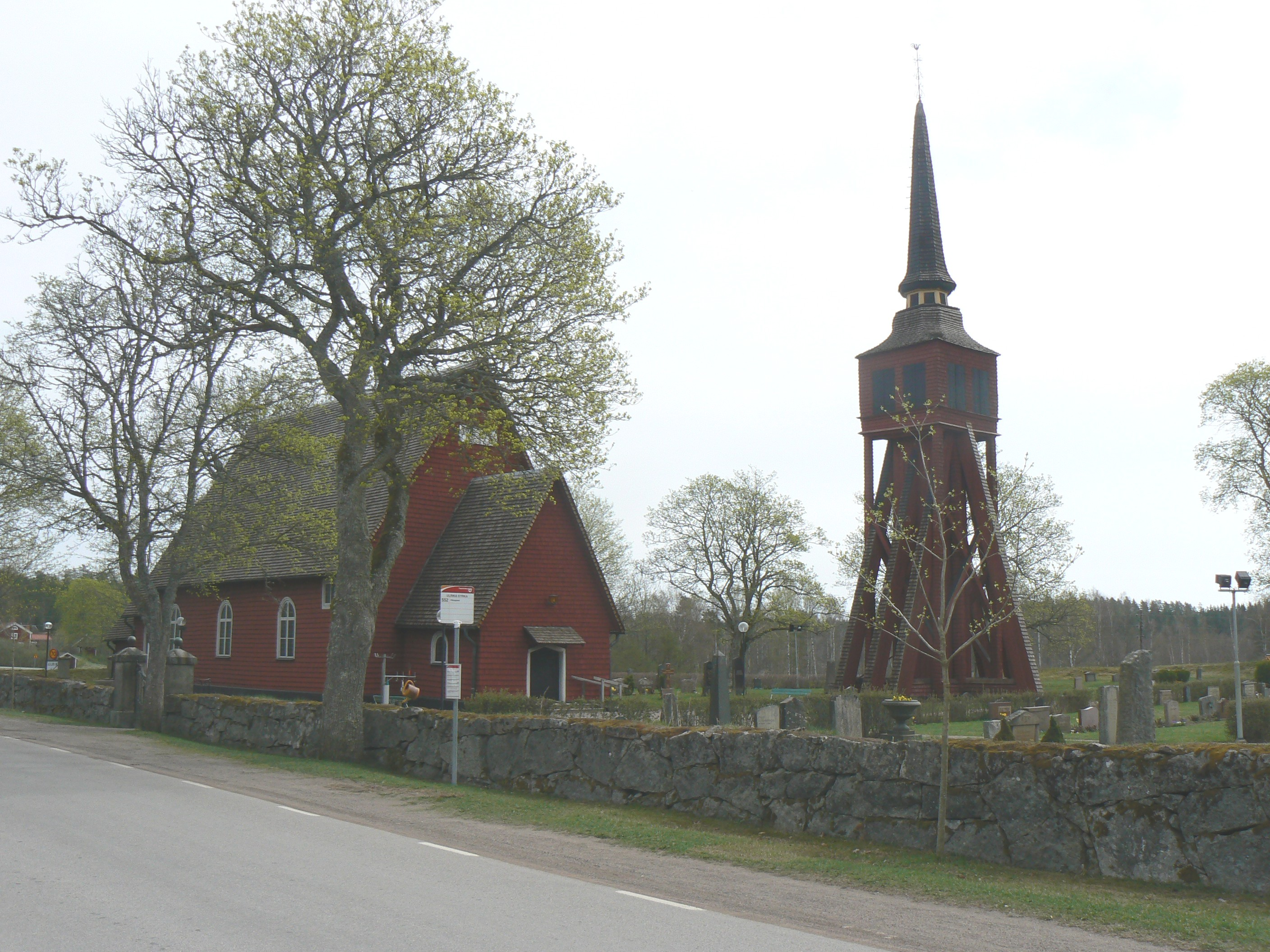
Ulrika Church

Ulrika is a locality situated in Linköping Municipality, Östergötland County, Sweden with 200 inhabitants in 2010. It is situated about 40 kilometers south-southwest of Linköping. Ulrika church, from which the village has its name, was built in 1737 and was named after Queen Ulrika Eleonora. The village has a quite isolated position in a landscape dominated by forest. No important roads pass through or near Ulrika, but smaller public roads from Vikingstad, Haraldsbo, Rimforsa, Kisa/Malexander and Boxholm meet here. Östgötatrafiken's bus line number 552 links Ulrika to Vikingstad railway station, 30 kilometers north, where the local trains Östgötapendeln stop. In Ulrika in 2012 there is a school, a little grocery store and cafe, an old people's home and a local museum that is open in the summer. A popular market is held in Ulrika every year in September.

== See also ==
- Drögen
