= Madängsholm =

- Location within Västra Götaland Location within Sweden
- Coordinates: 58°09′N 13°55′E
- Country: Sweden
- Province: Västergötland
- County: Västra Götaland County
- Municipality: Tidaholm Municipality

Area
  - Total: 0.81 km^{2} (0.31 sq mi)

Population (31 December 2010)
  - Total: 425
  - Density: 523/km^{2} (1,350/sq mi)
- Time zone: UTC+1 (CET)
  - Summer (DST): UTC+2 (CEST)
- Climate: Dfb

The village Madängsholm in Västergötland, Sweden

Madängsholm is a locality situated in Tidaholm Municipality, Västra Götaland County, Sweden with 425 inhabitants in 2010.
