= Arentorp =

- Location within Västra Götaland Location within Sweden
- Coordinates: 58°14′N 12°52′E
- Country: Sweden
- Province: Västergötland
- County: Västra Götaland County
- Municipality: Vara Municipality

Area
  - Total: 0.58 km^{2} (0.22 sq mi)

Population (31 December 2010)
  - Total: 472
  - Density: 821/km^{2} (2,130/sq mi)
- Time zone: UTC+1 (CET)
  - Summer (DST): UTC+2 (CEST)
- Climate: Cfb
- Website: arentorp.com

Arentorp is a locality situated in Vara Municipality, Västra Götaland County, Sweden with 472 inhabitants in 2010.
