= Borghamn =

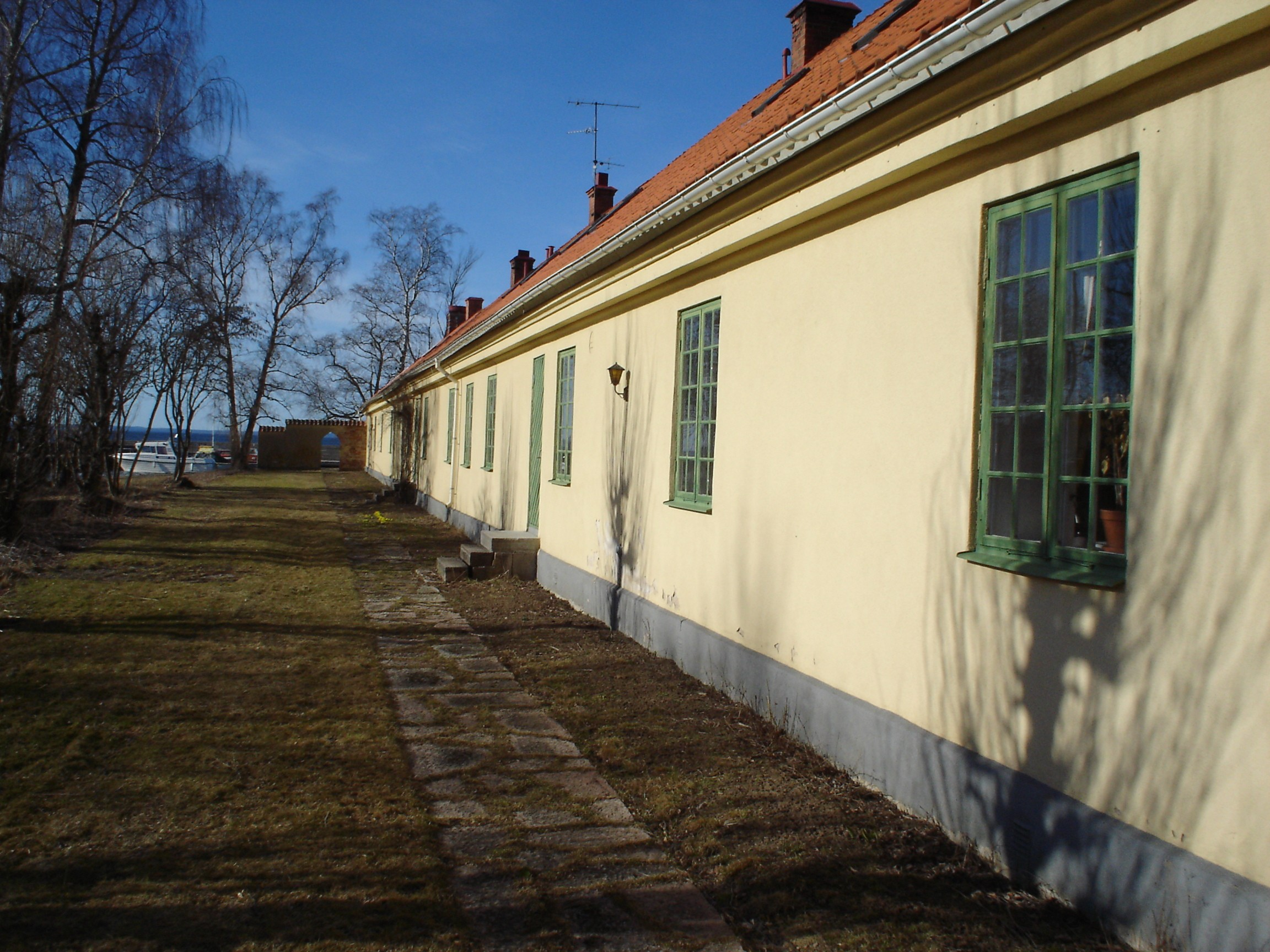

- Location within Östergötland Location within Sweden
- Coordinates: 58°23′N 14°41′E
- Country: Sweden
- Province: Östergötland
- County: Östergötland County
- Municipality: Vadstena Municipality

Area
  - Total: 0.75 km^{2} (0.29 sq mi)

Population (2005-12-31)
  - Total: 227
  - Density: 301/km^{2} (780/sq mi)
- Time zone: UTC+1 (CET)
  - Summer (DST): UTC+2 (CEST)

Borghamn is a village situated in Vadstena Municipality, Östergötland County, Sweden with 227 inhabitants in 2005.
