= Önneköp =

- Location within Skåne Location within Sweden
- Coordinates: 55°47′11″N 13°52′17″E
- Country: Sweden
- Province: Skåne
- County: Skåne County
- Municipality: Hörby Municipality

Area
  - Total: 0.27 km^{2} (0.10 sq mi)

Population (31 December 2010)
  - Total: 206
  - Density: 759/km^{2} (1,970/sq mi)
- Time zone: UTC+1 (CET)
  - Summer (DST): UTC+2 (CEST)

Önneköp is a locality situated in Hörby Municipality, Skåne County, Sweden with 206 inhabitants in 2010.
