= Värsås =

- Location within Västra Götaland Location within Sweden
- Coordinates: 58°21′N 14°03′E
- Country: Sweden
- Province: Västergötland
- County: Västra Götaland County
- Municipality: Skövde Municipality

Area
  - Total: 0.64 km^{2} (0.25 sq mi)

Population (31 December 2010)
  - Total: 578
  - Density: 901/km^{2} (2,330/sq mi)
- Time zone: UTC+1 (CET)
  - Summer (DST): UTC+2 (CEST)

Värsås (Swedish pronunciation: [ˈvæ̂ːʂoːs]) is a locality situated in Skövde Municipality, Västra Götaland County, Sweden with 578 inhabitants in 2010.
