= Björketorp =

- Location within Västra Götaland Location within Sweden
- Coordinates: 57°26′N 12°31′E
- Country: Sweden
- Province: Västergötland
- County: Västra Götaland County
- Municipality: Mark Municipality

Area
  - Total: 0.60 km^{2} (0.23 sq mi)

Population (31 December 2010)
  - Total: 467
  - Density: 773/km^{2} (2,000/sq mi)
- Time zone: UTC+1 (CET)
  - Summer (DST): UTC+2 (CEST)

Björketorp is a locality situated in Mark Municipality, Västra Götaland County, Sweden. It had 467 inhabitants in 2010.
