= Latorp =

Village in Örebro Municipality, Sweden

Coordinates: 59.28710°N 14.98988°E

Latorp is a village of Örebro Municipality in Sweden. It is located about 12 kilometers west of Örebro, and has a population of about 500. Recently the local inhabitants saved a local school by protesting against its permanent closure with the help of 130 liters of popcorn. Latorp was also the centre for a campaign in 2004 against the Tysslinge area becoming a city of its own. The village has a very active community council (Swedish: Byalag). Among the task of the community council is to arrange culture festivals. A minority of the inhabitants belong to the ELIM church. Latorps lies halfway between Örebro and the Ånnaboda skiing resort.
