= Mosås =

- Location within Örebro Location within Sweden
- Coordinates: 59°12′N 15°08′E
- Country: Sweden
- Province: Närke
- County: Örebro County
- Municipality: Örebro Municipality

Area
  - Total: 2.70 km^{2} (1.04 sq mi)

Population (2005-12-31)
  - Total: 899
  - Density: 333/km^{2} (860/sq mi)
- Time zone: UTC+1 (CET)
  - Summer (DST): UTC+2 (CEST)

Mosås (Swedish pronunciation: [mʊˈsoːs]) is a village situated in Örebro Municipality, Örebro County, Sweden with 899 inhabitants in 2005.
