= Marketta Hartikka =

Finnish footballer (born 1949)

Personal information
- Date of birth: 4 July 1949 (age 77)
- Position: Midfielder

Senior career*
Years	Team	Apps	(Gls)
1973–1978	HJK		

International career
1973–1978	Finland	14	(1)
- * Club domestic league appearances and goals

Marketta Hartikka (born 4 July 1949) is a Finnish former footballer who played for HJK and the Finnish women's national team. She represented Finland 14 times between 1973 and 1978 and was the first captain of the national team.
