= Vikingstad =

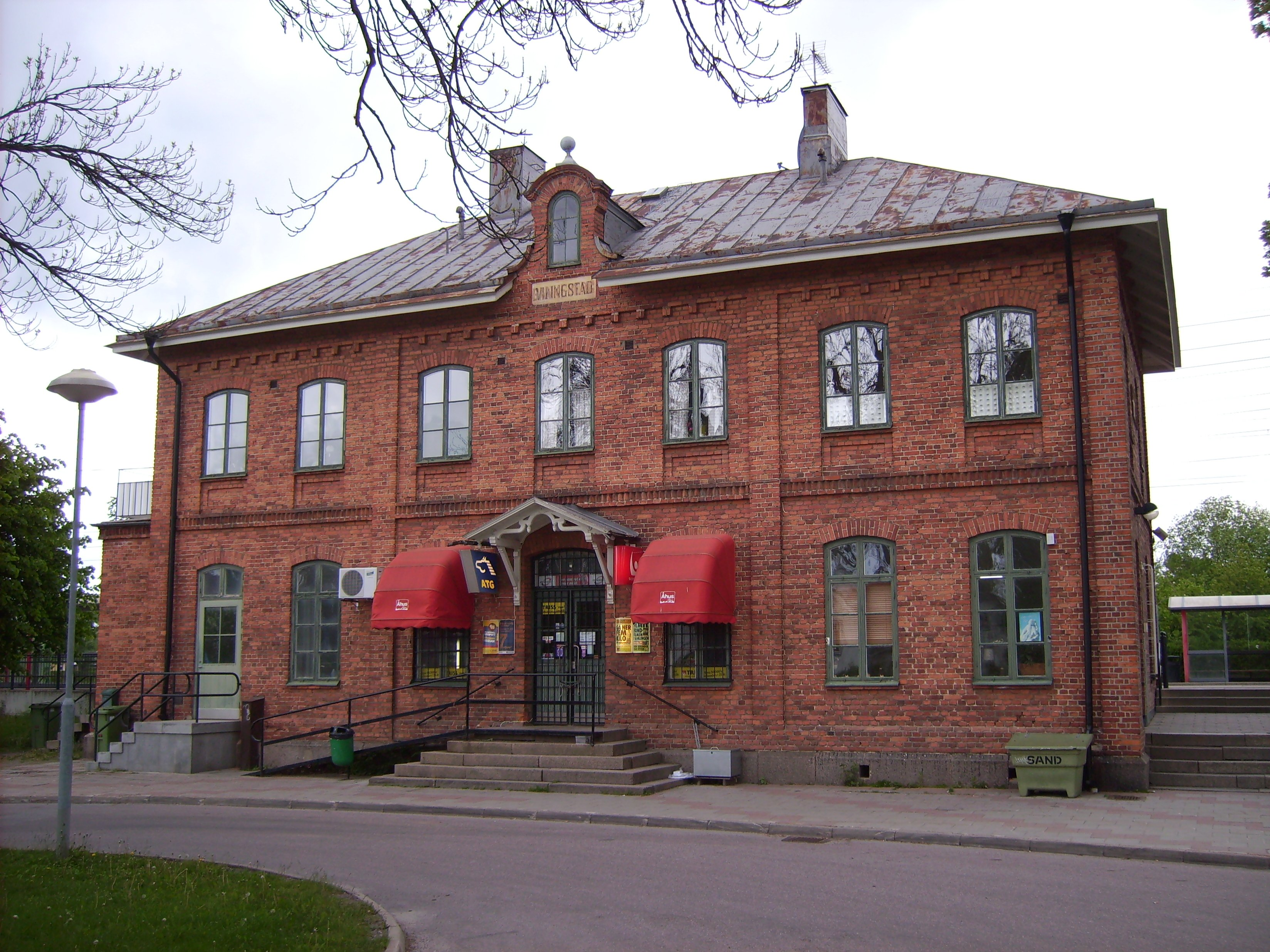
- Vikingstad railway station in May 2007

- Location within Östergötland Location within Sweden
- Coordinates: 58°23′N 15°26′E
- Country: Sweden
- Province: Östergötland
- County: Östergötland County
- Municipality: Linköping Municipality

Area
  - Total: 1.61 km^{2} (0.62 sq mi)

Population (31 December 2010)
  - Total: 2,096
  - Density: 1,302/km^{2} (3,370/sq mi)
- Time zone: UTC+1 (CET)
  - Summer (DST): UTC+2 (CEST)

Vikingstad is a locality situated in Linköping Municipality, Östergötland County, Sweden with 2,096 inhabitants in 2010.

== Riksdag elections ==
Year	%	Votes	V	S	MP	C	L	KD	M	SD	NyD	Left	Right
1973	94.2	1,667	2.4	39.2		33.4	8.6	2.0	14.3			41.6	56.4
1976	95.3	1,772	1.4	38.4		30.1	9.8	1.4	18.8			39.8	58.7
1979	93.9	1,907	3.0	37.8		23.1	10.4	1.4	24.5			40.1	58.1
1982	94.6	1,944	2.7	38.7	0.9	21.7	4.9	2.2	29.0			41.4	55.6
1985	93.7	2,059	2.5	39.8	1.2	16.4	14.6		25.4			42.3	56.3
1988	86.9	1,896	4.0	39.2	4.0	17.2	11.1	3.8	20.6			47.2	48.9
1991	92.3	1,992	2.8	30.9	2.6	10.5	8.4	12.0	24.2		7.6	33.7	55.1
1994	90.4	2,007	3.8	41.8	4.8	11.1	6.8	5.8	23.4		1.5	50.3	47.2
1998	87.6	1,904	8.1	33.5	3.8	7.8	3.3	17.4	23.9			45.5	52.4
2002	84.8	1,880	4.8	41.1	2.9	9.6	13.1	11.9	13.7	0.8		48.8	48.3
2006	85.2	1,922	3.1	35.7	4.1	11.2	7.4	7.9	25.2	2.7		42.9	51.7
2010	88.7	2,058	3.1	27.8	6.7	7.6	8.5	6.0	32.1	7.2		37.6	54.2
2014	90.2	2,178	2.3	28.3	5.3	7.9	6.6	5.9	25.8	16.1		36.0	46.1
2018	91.8	2,302	3.5	26.3	4.1	10.8	5.8	6.2	23.9	18.5		44.7	54.3

== Notable people ==
- Inga-Lill Andersson, actor
- Matilda Ekholm, table tennis player
- Tage Danielsson, author who has his roots in Vikingstad
