= Öxabäck =

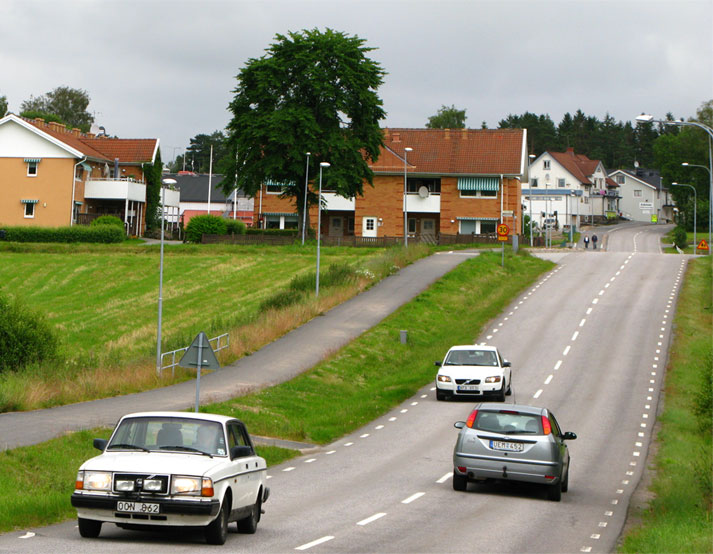

- Location within Västra Götaland Location within Sweden
- Coordinates: 57°24′N 12°48′E
- Country: Sweden
- Province: Västergötland
- County: Västra Götaland County
- Municipality: Mark Municipality

Area
  - Total: 0.42 km^{2} (0.16 sq mi)

Population (31 December 2010)
  - Total: 300
  - Density: 715/km^{2} (1,850/sq mi)
- Time zone: UTC+1 (CET)
  - Summer (DST): UTC+2 (CEST)

Öxabäck is a locality situated in Mark Municipality, Västra Götaland County, Sweden. It had 300 inhabitants in 2010.
