= Districts of Småland =

This is a list of the historical districts or härader in the province of Småland, Sweden. Each district was also subdivided into congregations.

== Provincial Districts in Kronoberg ==
- Allbo
- Kinnevald
- Konga
- Sunnerbo
- Norrvidinge
- Uppvidinge

== Provincial Districts in the County of Kalmar ==
- Aspeland
- Hanbörd
- Norra Möre
- Södra Möre
- Sevede
- Stranda
- Norra Tjust
- Södra Tjust
- Tuna län

== Provincial Districts in the County of Jönköping ==
- Bellö
- Edshult
- Eksjö
- Flisby
- Hult
- Hässleby
- Höreda
- Ingatorp
- Mellby
- Mo
- Norra Solberga
- Tveta
- Vista
- Vedbo
- Norra Vedbo
- Västbo
- Östbo
- Västra
- Östra

== See also ==
- Kronoberg County
- Kalmar County
- Jönköping County
