= Solberga =

Solberga may refer to:

- Solberga, Nässjö, Jönköping County, Sweden
- Solberga, Österåker, Stockholm County, Sweden
- Solberga Abbey, a former Cistercian nunnery in Sweden
- Solberga, Stockholm, a district in Stockholm municipality.
