= Småland (disambiguation) =

Småland is a historical province in southern Sweden.

Småland may also refer to:

== Places ==
=== Sweden ===
- Småland and the islands (Småland med öarna), a National Area

=== Norway ===
- Småland, Frosta, a village in Frosta Municipality in Trøndelag county
- Småland, Inderøy, a village in Inderøy Municipality in Trøndelag county
- Småland, Levanger, a village in Levanger Municipality in Trøndelag county

=== Denmark ===
- Smålandsfarvandet, part of the ocean between the islands of Zealand, Lolland, and Falster

== Other uses ==
- Småland Nation, Lund, a student nation of Lund University in Sweden
- HSwMS Småland, several ships of the Swedish Navy
- Småland, the children's play area in IKEA stores

== See also ==
- Smaalenene, the old name of Østfold county in Norway
