= Skuruhatt =

Hill in Sweden

Coordinates: 57°42′N 15°05′E

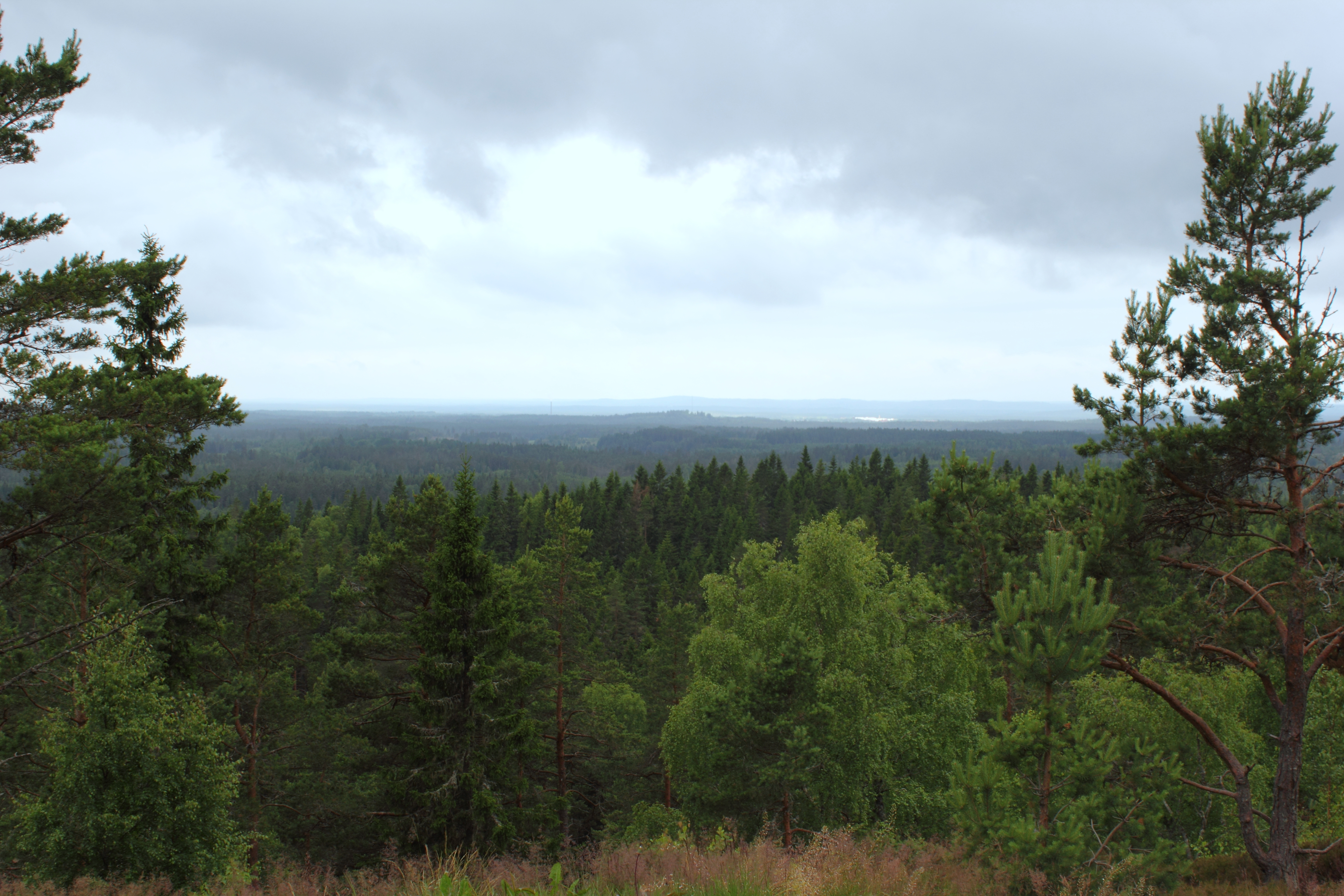
The forested landscape of the South Swedish highlands seen from Skuruhatt.

Skuruhatt is a steep hilltop near Skurugata in Eksjö Municipality in southern Sweden, with expansive views of the interior of Småland. Nearby a stone has been placed with the following Swedish inscription by Albert Engström.

Folket som bor i dessa gårdar torde vara av renaste guld -- dessa sega magra arbetare som brottas med sin fattiga jord och segra, segra är det icke ett folk att hålla av.
Albert Engström
