= Grimstorp =

- Location within Jönköping Location within Sweden
- Coordinates: 57°33′33″N 14°41′51″E
- Country: Sweden
- Province: Småland
- County: Jönköping County
- Municipality: Nässjö Municipality

Area
  - Total: 0.45 km^{2} (0.17 sq mi)

Population (31 December 2010)
  - Total: 344
  - Density: 772/km^{2} (2,000/sq mi)
- Time zone: UTC+1 (CET)
  - Summer (DST): UTC+2 (CEST)

Grimstorp is a locality situated in Nässjö Municipality, Jönköping County, Sweden, with 344 inhabitants in 2010.
