= Fredriksdal =

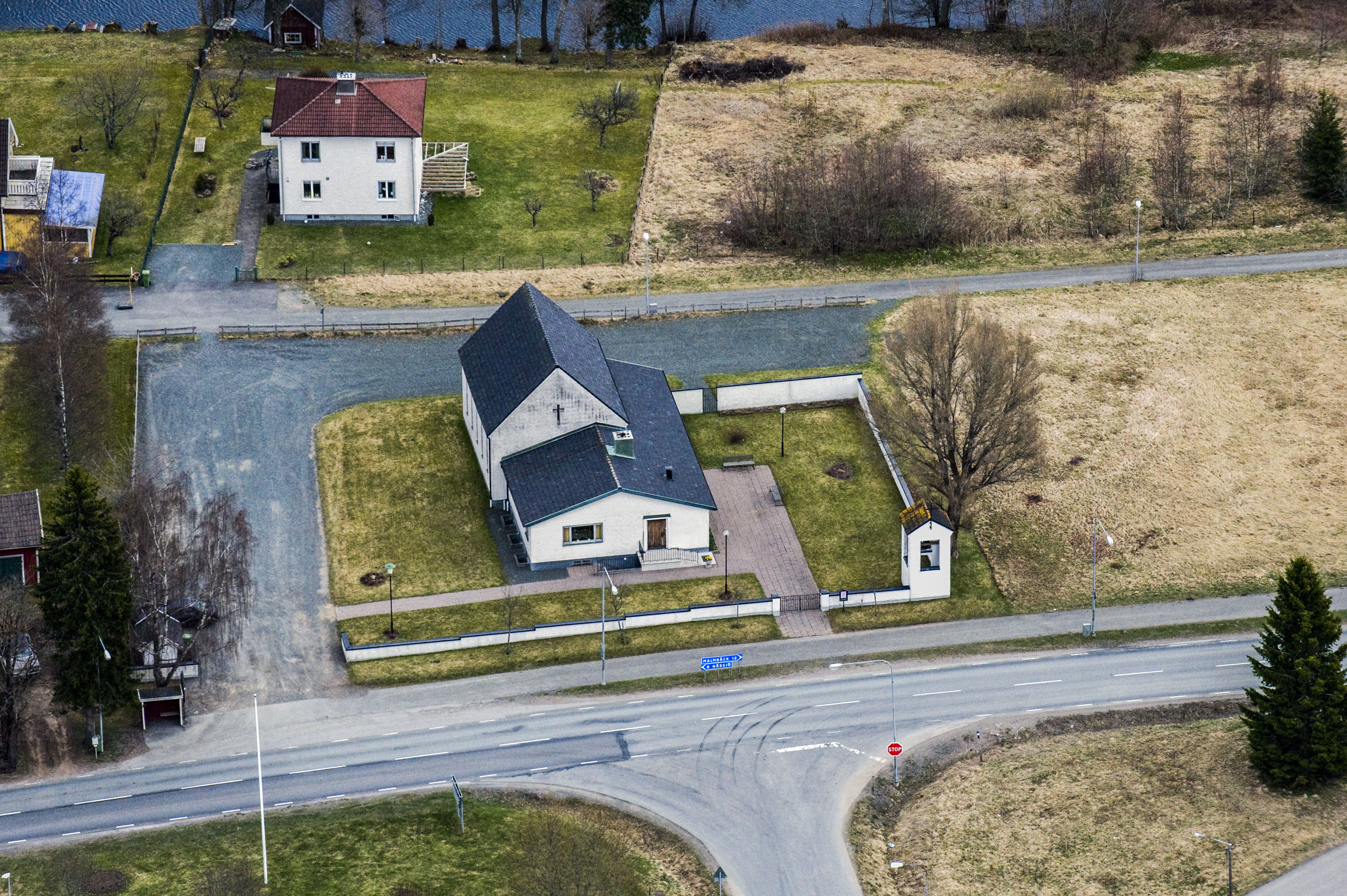

- Location within Jönköping Location within Sweden
- Coordinates: 57°37′N 14°36′E
- Country: Sweden
- Province: Småland
- County: Jönköping County
- Municipality: Nässjö Municipality

Area
  - Total: 0.47 km^{2} (0.18 sq mi)

Population (31 December 2010)
  - Total: 310
  - Density: 666/km^{2} (1,720/sq mi)
- Time zone: UTC+1 (CET)
  - Summer (DST): UTC+2 (CEST)

Fredriksdal is a locality situated in Nässjö Municipality, Jönköping County, Sweden with 310 inhabitants in 2010.
