= Fössta tossdan i mass =

Tongue-in-cheek observance in Sweden

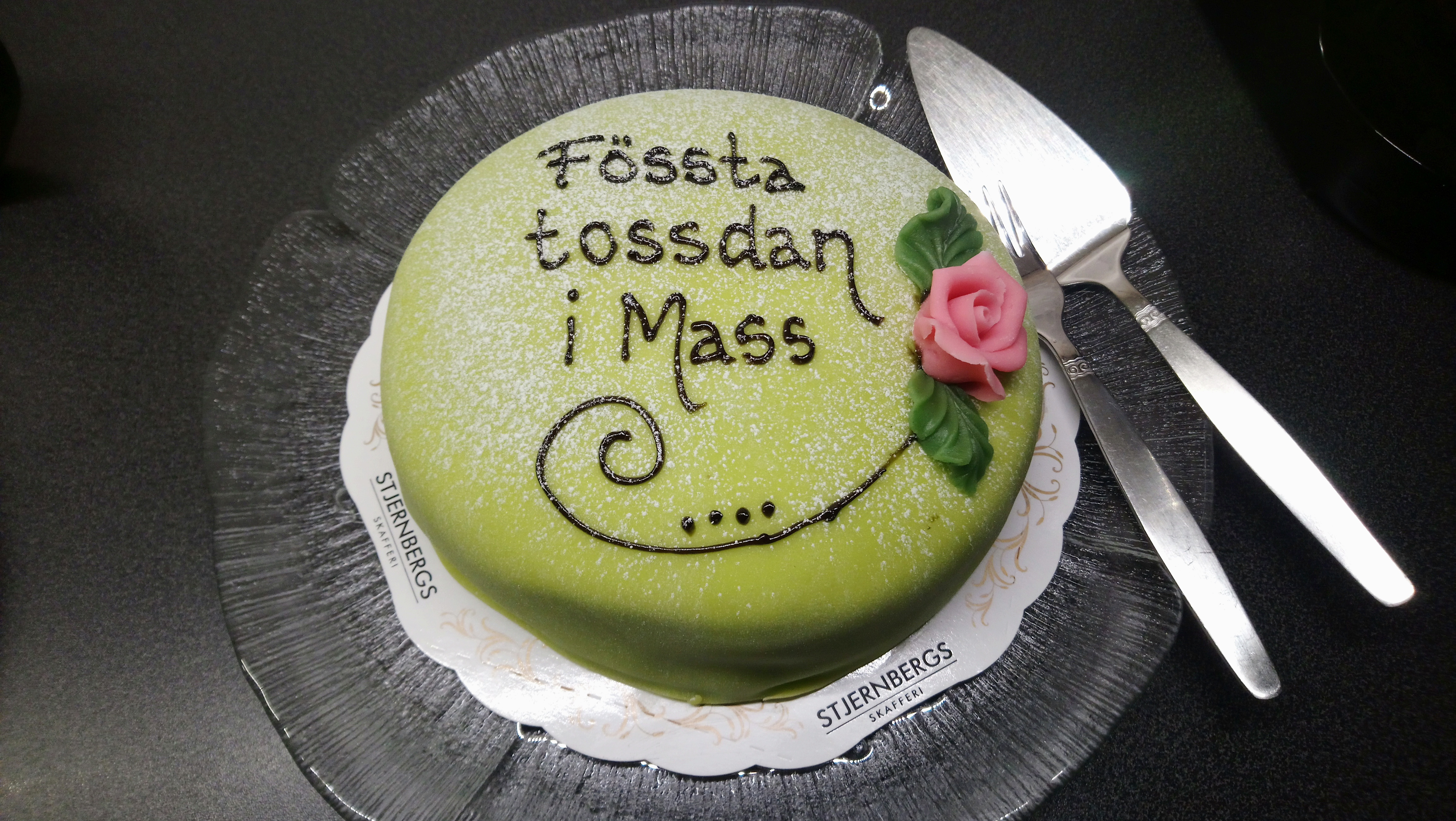
- Marzipan cake decorated with the text Fössta tossdan i Mass
- Observed by: Småland
- Celebrations: marzipan cake
- Date: First Thursday in March
- Frequency: annual

Fössta tossdan i mass ('First Thursday in March') is an unofficial and somewhat tongue-in-cheek national day for the landskap (traditional province) of Småland in south-central Sweden. The basis of the celebration is the characteristic tendency of the Småland dialect to omit the sound /r/ when it comes at the beginning of a consonant cluster; as the phrase 'first Thursday in March', första torsdagen i mars in Swedish, has three such instances in quick succession, it makes this tic particularly conspicuous, sounding like fössta tossdan i mass when pronounced in a broad Småland accent. The holiday is celebrated with a marzipan cake (marsipantårta, pronounced massipantååta in the Småland accent), ideally decorated with the text Fössta tossdan i mass.

== Background ==
The holiday was founded by the Smålander Jonas Svenningson, who was amused by the way his aunt, who had a particularly strong local accent, referred to 1 March as fössta mass. Building on this, he added tossdan (the Småland pronunciation of torsdagen, 'the Thursday') to create the phrase fössta tossdan i mars, and in February 2010 he created a Facebook page under this title. Already by 3 March 2010, the very first fössta tossdan, the page had accumulated 500 followers.

The celebration was first brought to wider attention in March 2012 by the local radio station P4 Jönköping, and it was in that same year that the idea of celebrating with a marzipan cake (or rather a massipantååta) was introduced. Since then, awareness of the event has increased, and it is now regarded as Småland's unofficial national day. Some people have also come up with new ways of celebrating the day in addition to the massipantååta, such as drinking bäss (i.e. bärs, a slang term for beer).

On March 4, 2021, Smålands Turism, Destination Småland and the local government of Kalmar County launched a joint social media campaign to promote Småland as a tourist destination by publicising Fössta Tossdan i Mass celebrations and by encouraging people to use Småländska expressions.
