= Bäckaby Old Church =

Coordinates: 57.7834°N 14.1391°E

- Bäckaby gamla kyrka
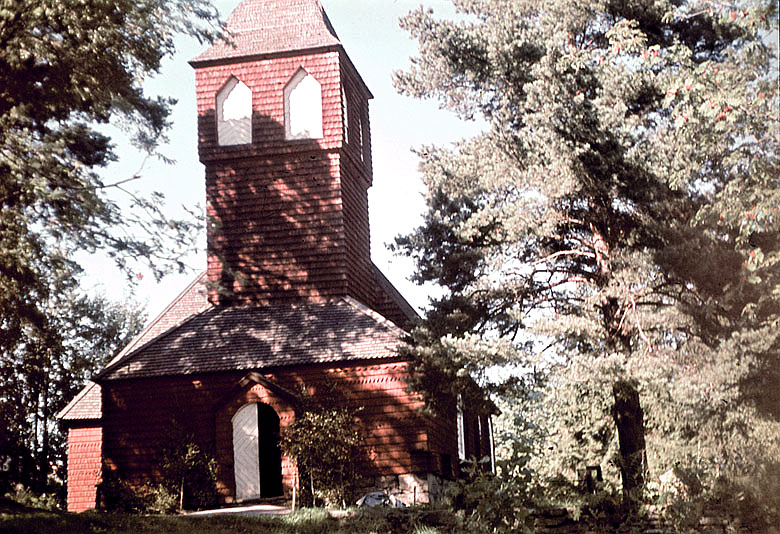
- Bäckaby Old Church in 1945
- Bäckaby Old Church
- Location: Jönköping
- Country: Sweden
- Denomination: Church of Sweden

Administration
- Diocese: Växjö
- Parish: Jönköping Sofia

Bäckaby Old Church (Swedish: Bäckaby gamla kyrka) was a wooden church building in Sweden. The oldest pieces were dated back to the 1320s. The old wooden church was originally in Bäckaby outside Vetlanda before being purchased by a private person and moved to the town park in Jönköping where it was reopened on 31 August 1902. Back in Bäckaby, Bäckaby Old Church had been replaced by the newer Bäckaby Church in 1899.

In the evening of 28 April 2000, the church was completely destroyed by a fire, which soon appeared to be an act of arson. Local press brought major attention to the fire when it appeared to be connected to satanism and modern Paganism. Many people missed the church, which had been a popular place for weddings and baptism.

In 2003 a memorial site was opened.

== See also ==
- Kulla Chapel
