= Anneberg =

Anneberg may refer to:

== Places ==
- Anneberg, Kungsbacka, a municipality in Halland County, Sweden
- Anneberg, Nässjö, a locality in Jönköping County, Sweden

== People with the surname ==
- Benjamin Anneberg (1865–1925), Finnish lawyer and politician
- Margery Anneberg (1966–1981), American museum founder, jeweler and gallerist
