= Immanuel Church, Halmstad =

Church in Halmstad, Sweden

Immanuel Church
- Immanuelskyrkan
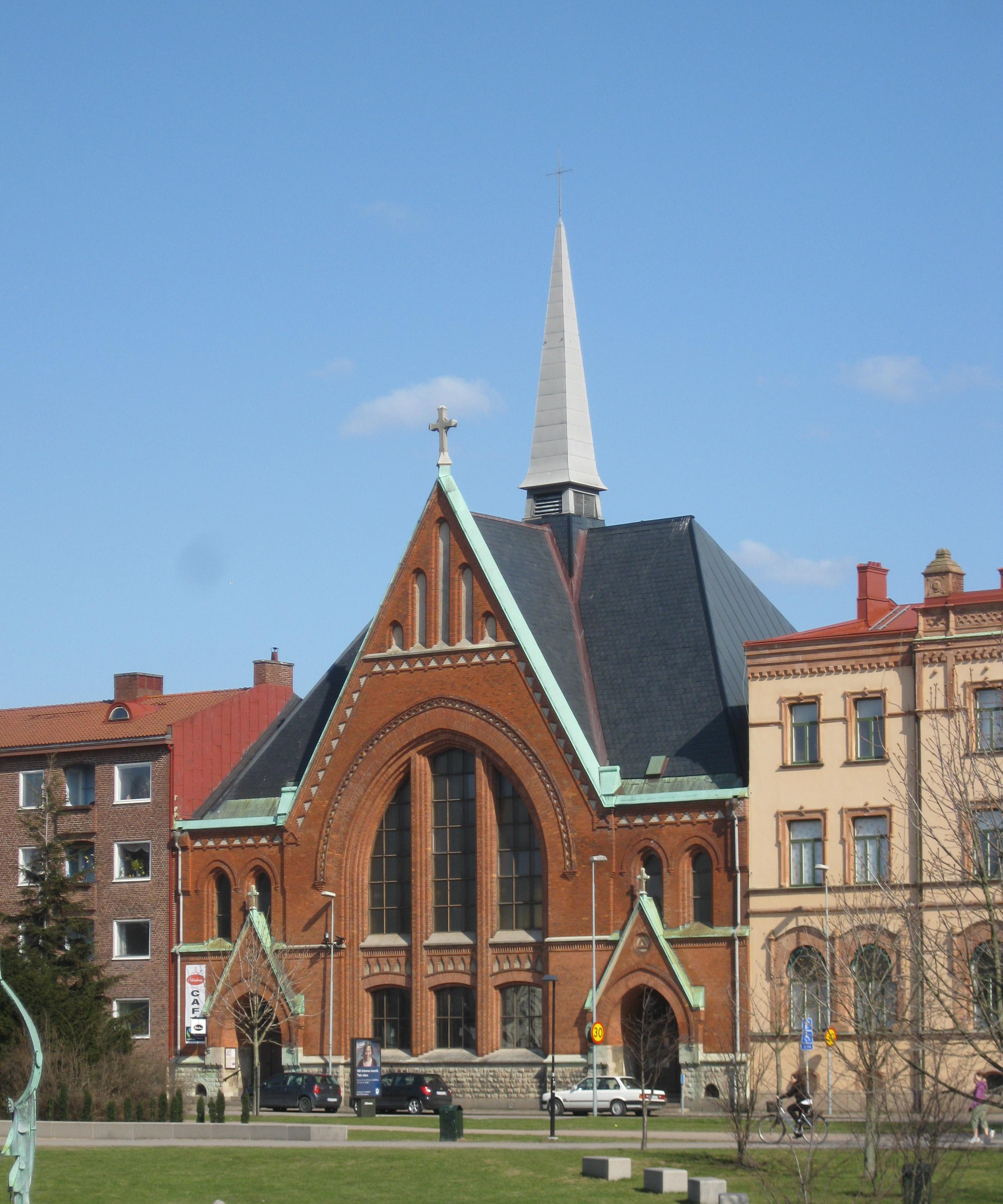
- Exterior (2010)
- Immanuel Church
- 56°40′23″N 12°51′42″E
- Address: Strandgatan 20, 302 46, Halmstad
- Country: Sweden
- Denomination: Church of Sweden

History
- Consecrated: 1900

Immanuel Church is a church building in Halmstad, located next to the Picasso Park on the eastern bank of the Nissan River.

The church was built in 1899-1900 based on drawings by architect Fritz Eckert. The inauguration was held on May 24, 1900, by Jakob Ekman and Paul Petter Waldenström. In 1905, new lightning was installed. In the mid-1980s, church's interior was rebuilt and the main area was divided into two floors. The upper floor now houses the worship room while the lower floor has a café.

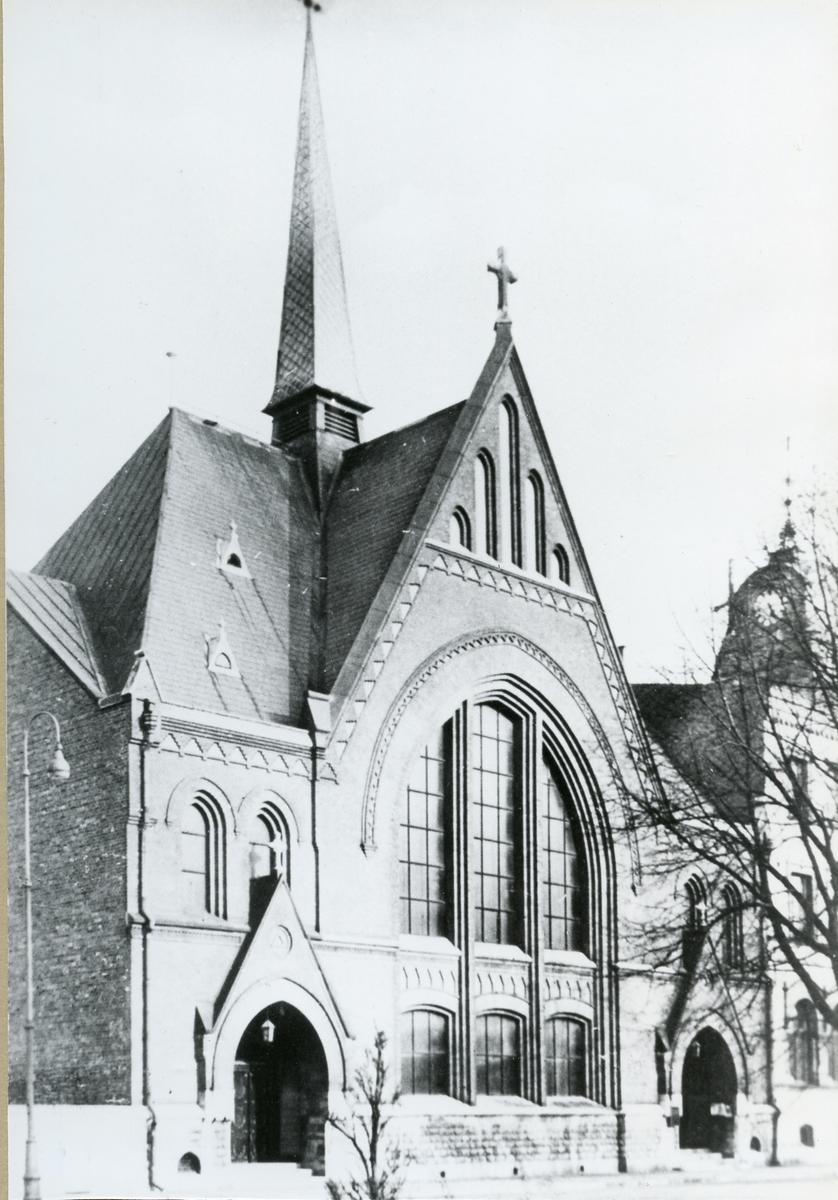
Old image, year unknown
