= Justus Peterson =

Swedish artist (1860–1889)

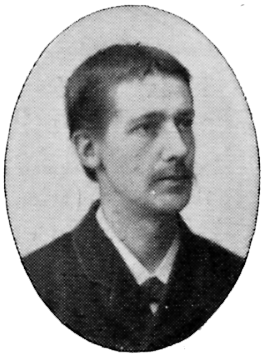
- Image of Justus Peterson from Svenskt Porträttgalleri XX
- Born: 8 August 1860; Malmbäck
- Died: 10 October 1889 (aged 29); Stockholm

Justus Peterson (1860–1889) was a Swedish artist.

He was born on 8 August 1860 in Malmbäck. He worked mostly with palette and made reproductions in this manner for several Swedish artists such as Carl Larsson, Höckert and Oscar Björck.

He died on 10 October 1889 in Stockholm.

== Gallery ==
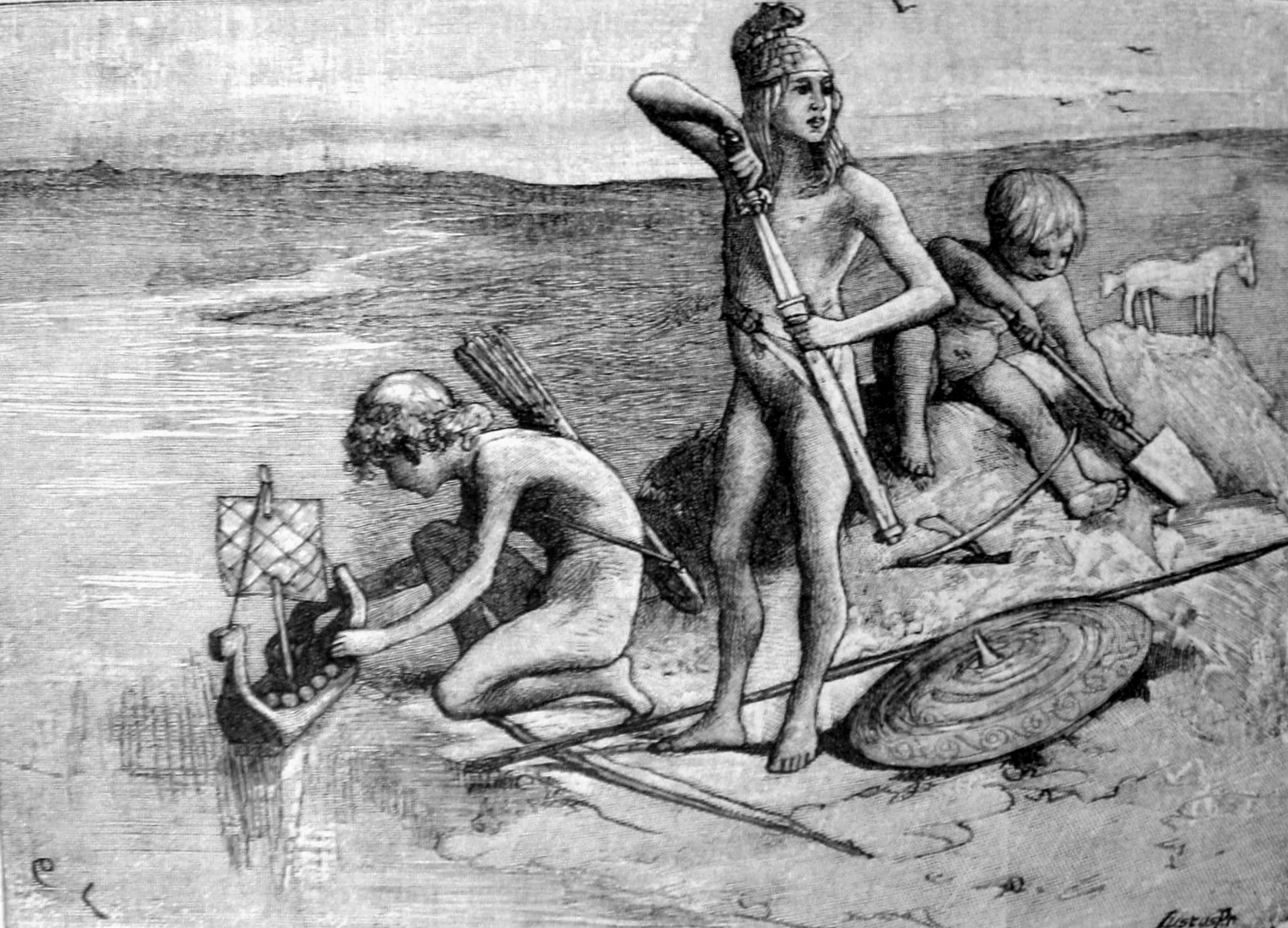
The sons of Mannus as depicted by Carl Larsson for Fredrik Sander's 1893 edition of the Poetic Edda. Woodcut by Justus Peterson
