= Skurugata =

Nature reserve in Jönköping County, Sweden

Coordinates: 57.71477°N 15.08505°E

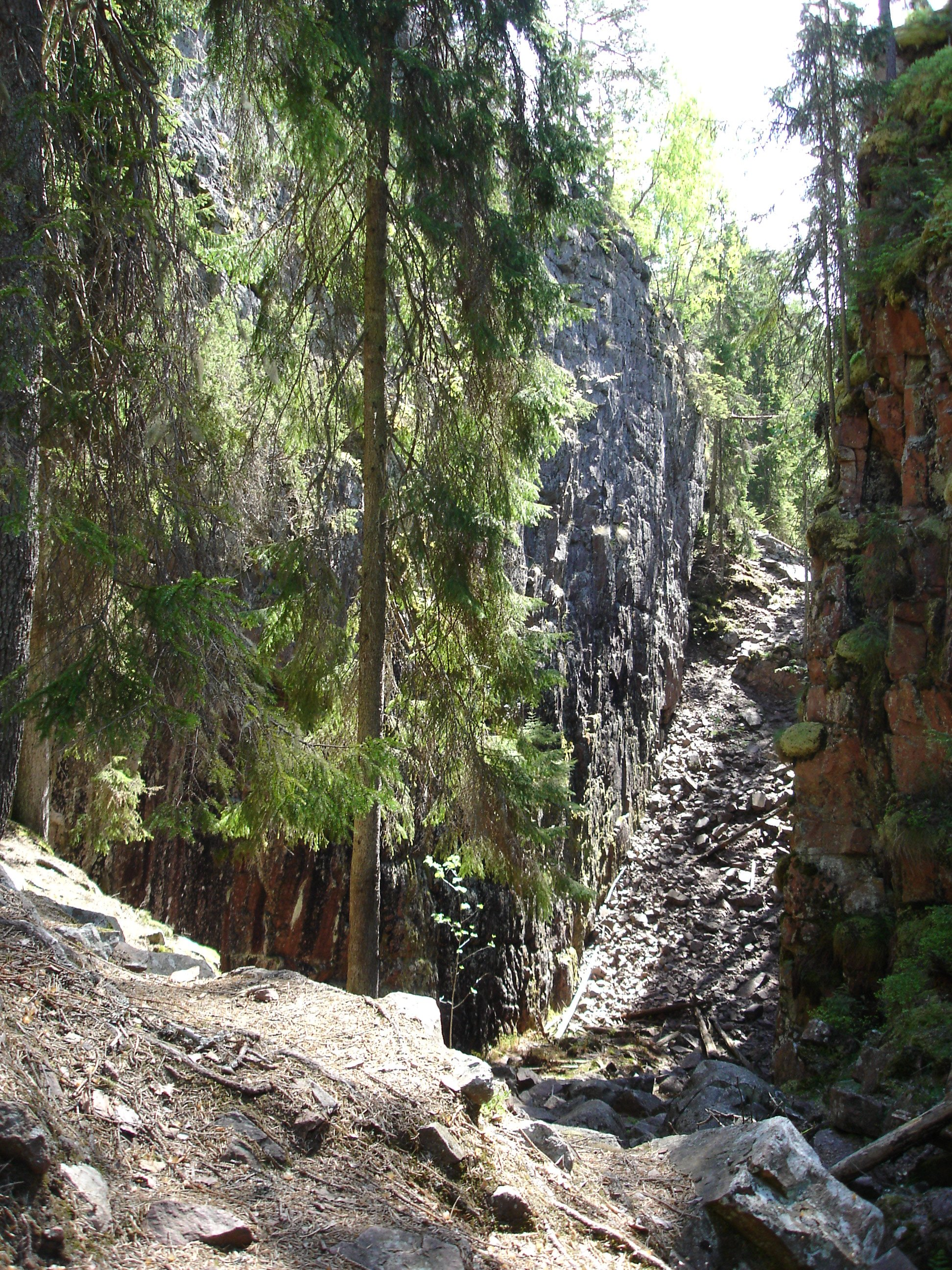
Skurugata

Skurugata is a rock canyon in Eksjö Municipality, southern Sweden, an 800-metre gorge which runs up to 56 metres deep and is at points only 7 metres wide.

There are several different theories for its origin but one of the more popular theories is that it was created by parallel faulting. The mountain around the gorge itself and the stones spread across its bottom consist largely of grey-brown and dark-brown porphyritic rock with elements of quartz and red feldspar. Several species of moss grow in and around the gorge, including Junger-mannia orcandesis and Steodon inponens.

In the middle of the gorge is a loose rock that can be removed to reveal a guestbook signed by other visitors (the exact location is marked by a small sign). In the summer, the temperature at the bottom of the gorge is typically somewhat lower than the area around the gorge, and in certain extreme years, pockets of snow and ice have remained until well into the summer. Early in the season, and after heavy rainfall, parts of the gorge may fill with water.

The area has been declared a naturreservat (forest and wildlife reserve) by the County Forestry Board and it is forbidden to damage the vegetation, to camp and light fires, to drive motor vehicles or to leave litter. Hiking is allowed (and encouraged) with a 2000-metre-long hiking trail through both the gorge and to the hill of Skuruhatt.

There is a legend that trolls live here.
