= Mariannelund =

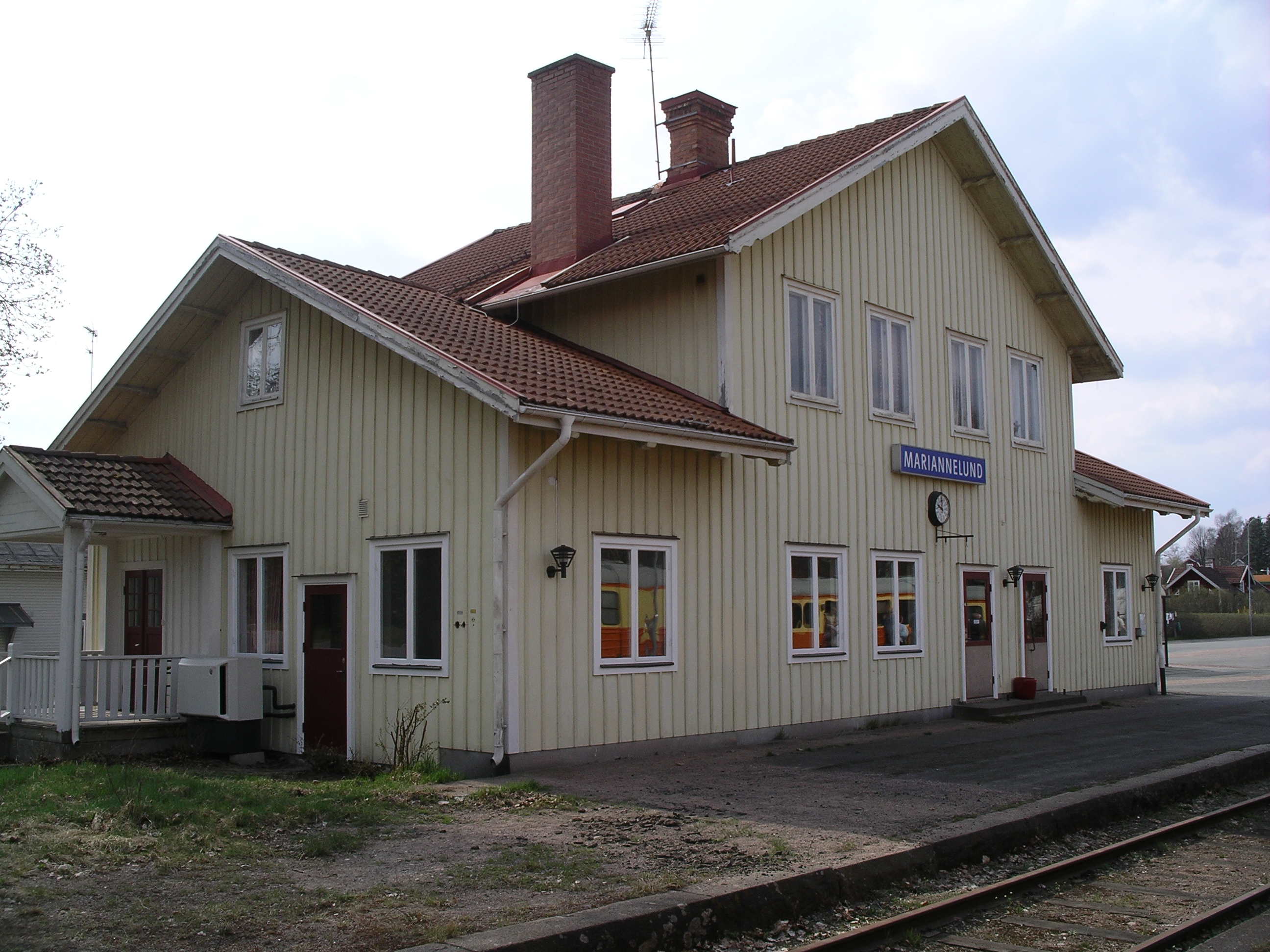
- Mariannelund railway station

- Location within Jönköping Location within Sweden
- Coordinates: 57°37′N 15°34′E
- Country: Sweden
- Province: Småland
- County: Jönköping County
- Municipality: Eksjö Municipality

Area
  - Total: 2.19 km^{2} (0.85 sq mi)

Population (31 December 2010)
  - Total: 1,468
  - Density: 669/km^{2} (1,730/sq mi)
- Time zone: UTC+1 (CET)
  - Summer (DST): UTC+2 (CEST)
- Climate: Cfb

Mariannelund is a locality situated in Hässleby parish in Eksjö Municipality, Jönköping County, in the region of Småland, Sweden with 1,468 inhabitants in 2010. Mariannelund grew considerably in the beginning of the 20th century. Heavy industry dominated the town for many years. Since the large paper factory was dismantled in the 1970s, Mariannelund has more and more become a centre for tourism.

Mariannelund is prominently featured in several films based on the works of Swedish author Astrid Lindgren, particularly the Emil in Lönneberga series. The town is also home to Filmbyn Småland, a film museum and theme park dedicated to Lindgren’s classic children’s films.
