= Stensjön =

- Location within Jönköping Location within Sweden
- Coordinates: 57°35′N 14°49′E
- Country: Sweden
- Province: Småland
- County: Jönköping County
- Municipality: Nässjö Municipality

Area
  - Total: 0.55 km^{2} (0.21 sq mi)

Population (31 December 2010)
  - Total: 224
  - Density: 407/km^{2} (1,050/sq mi)
- Time zone: UTC+1 (CET)
  - Summer (DST): UTC+2 (CEST)

Stensjön is a locality situated in Nässjö Municipality, Jönköping County, Sweden with 224 inhabitants in 2010.
