= Bodafors =

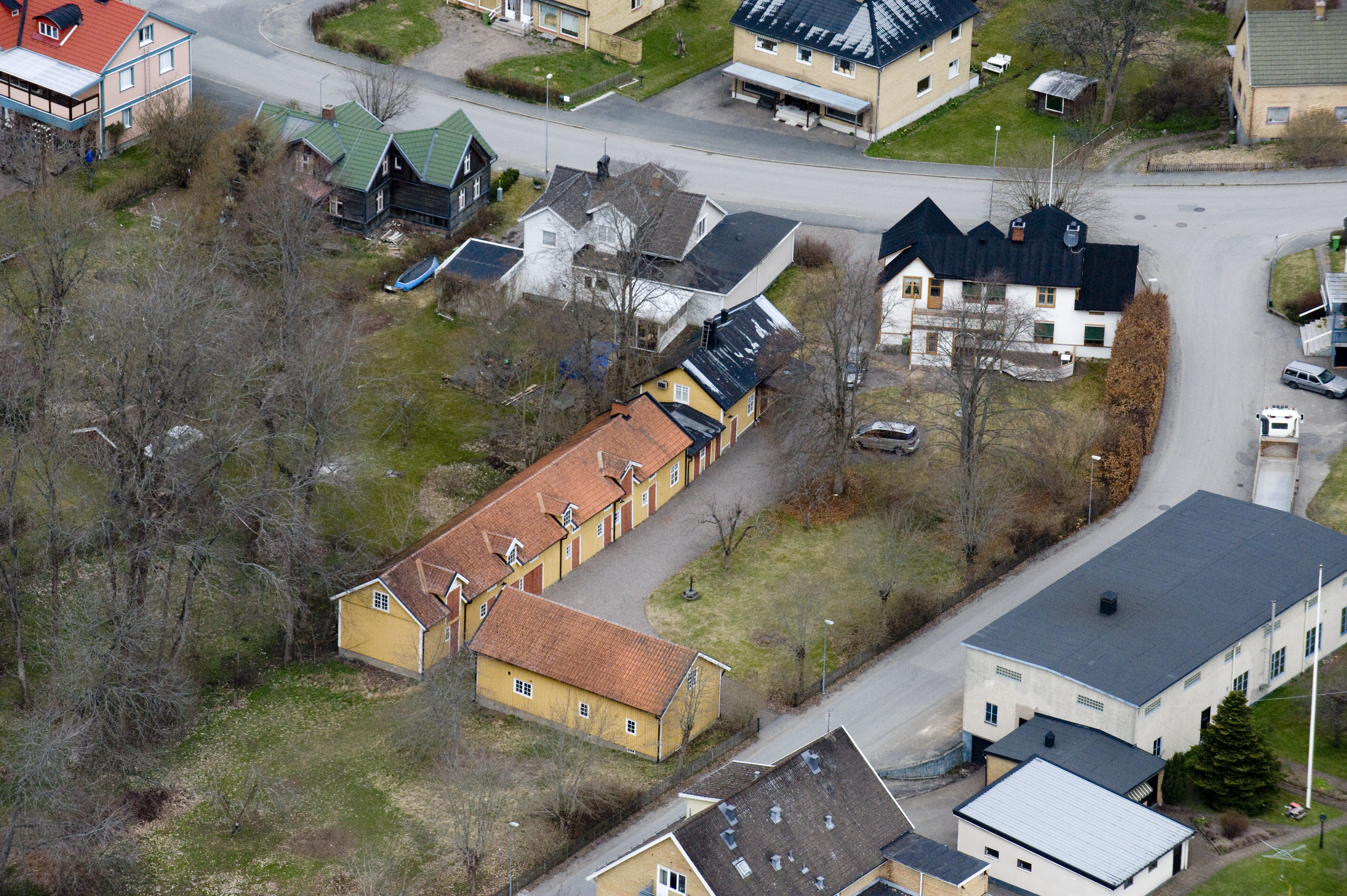

- Coat of arms

- Location within Jönköping Location within Sweden
- Coordinates: 57°30′N 14°42′E
- Country: Sweden
- Province: Småland
- County: Jönköping County
- Municipality: Nässjö Municipality

Area
  - Total: 2.54 km^{2} (0.98 sq mi)

Population (31 December 2010)
  - Total: 1,886
  - Density: 743/km^{2} (1,920/sq mi)
- Time zone: UTC+1 (CET)
  - Summer (DST): UTC+2 (CEST)

Bodafors (Swedish pronunciation: [bʊdaˈfɔʂː]) is a locality situated in Nässjö Municipality, Jönköping County, Sweden with 1,886 inhabitants as of 31 December 2010.
