= Hjältevad =

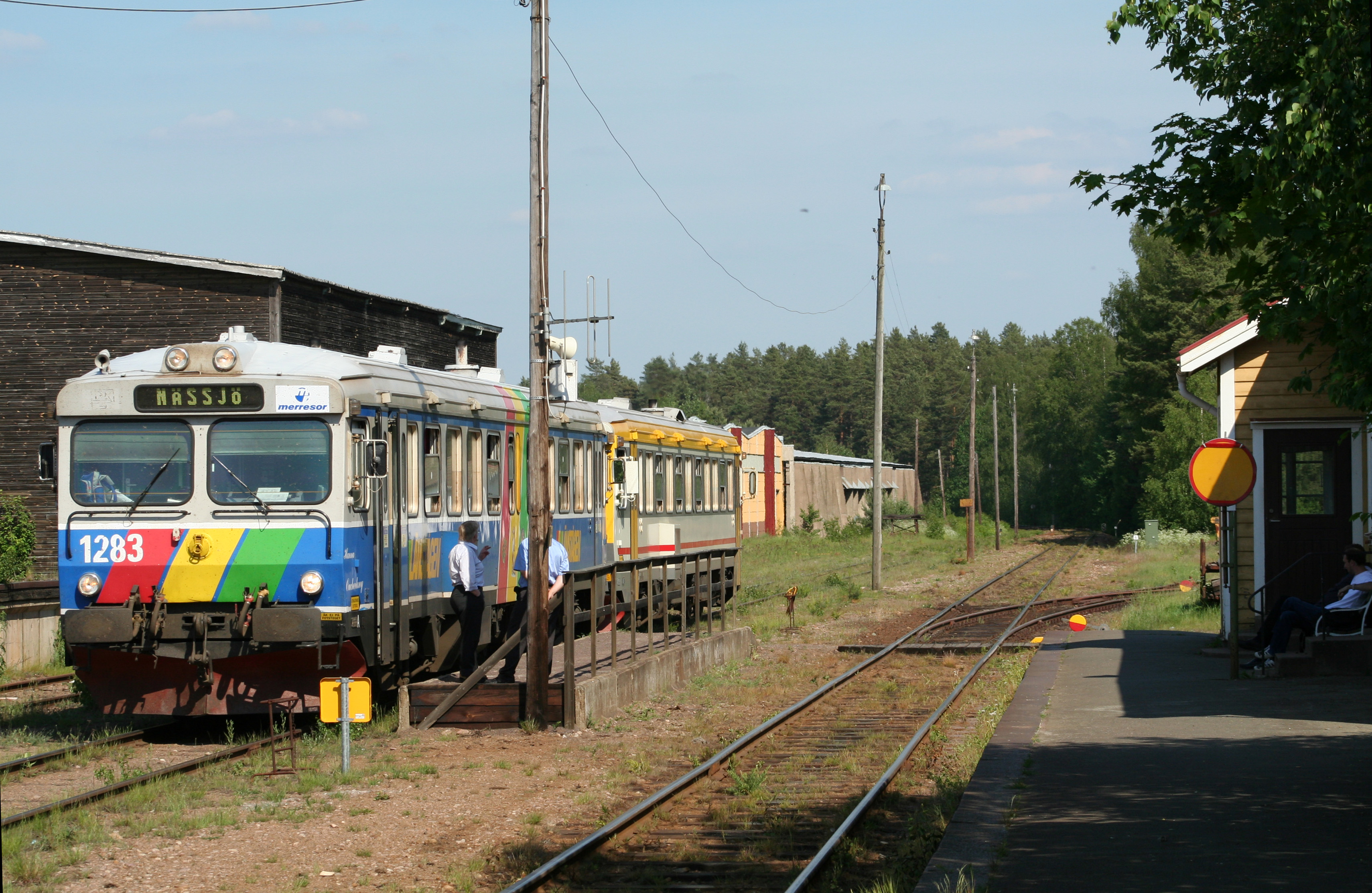

- Location within Jönköping Location within Sweden
- Coordinates: 57°38′N 15°20′E
- Country: Sweden
- Province: Småland
- County: Jönköping County
- Municipality: Eksjö Municipality

Area
  - Total: 1.03 km^{2} (0.40 sq mi)

Population (31 December 2010)
  - Total: 335
  - Density: 324/km^{2} (840/sq mi)
- Time zone: UTC+1 (CET)
  - Summer (DST): UTC+2 (CEST)
- Climate: Cfb

Hjältevad is a locality situated in Eksjö Municipality, Jönköping County, Sweden with 335 inhabitants in 2010.
