= Kulla Chapel =

Coordinates: 57.6085°N 14.8455°E

- Kulla kapell
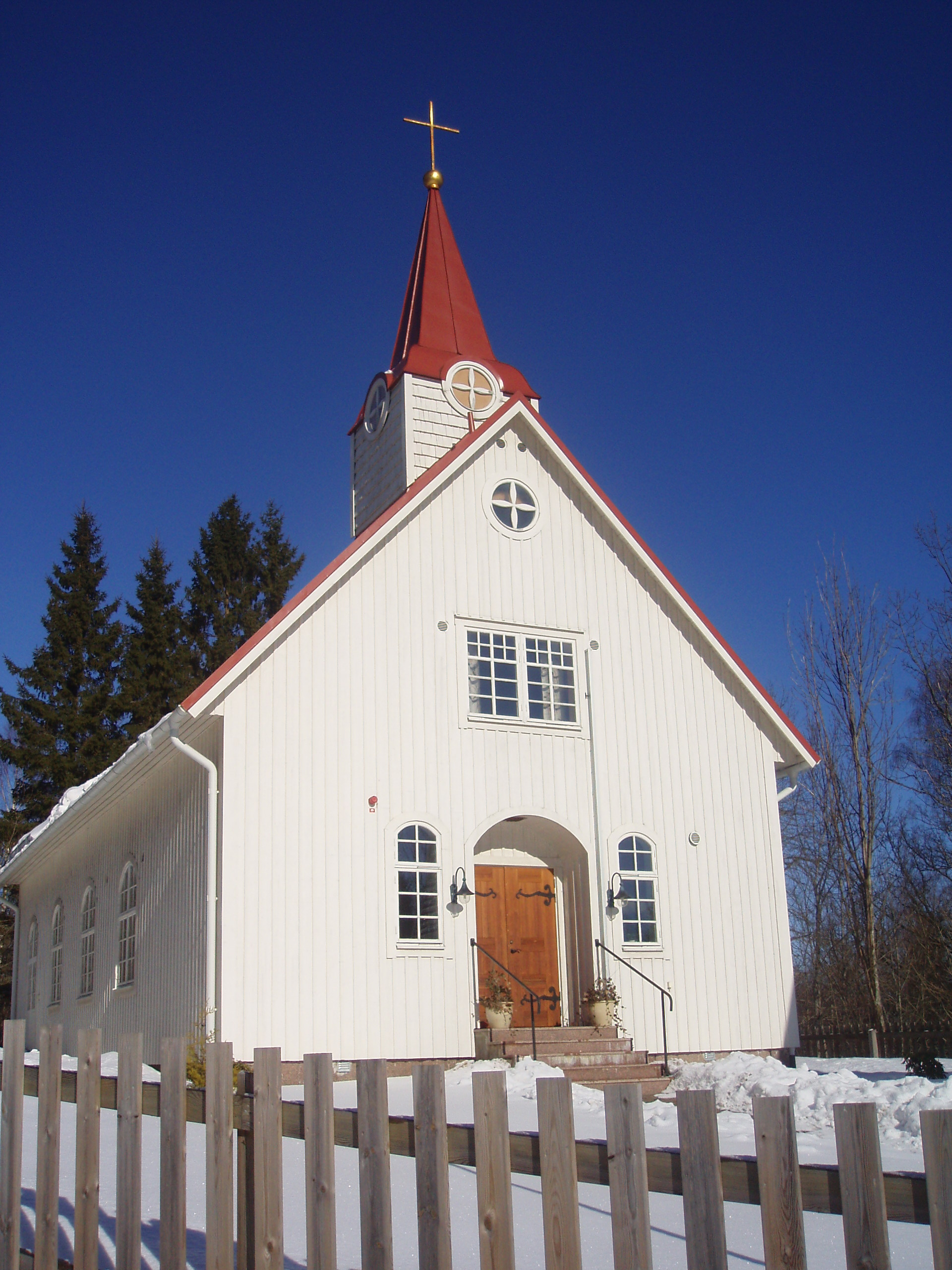
- Kulla Chapel in February 2006
- Kulla Chapel
- Location: Eksjö Municipality
- Country: Sweden
- Denomination: Church of Sweden

Administration
- Diocese: Linköping
- Parish: Höreda

Kulla Chapel (Swedish: Kulla kapell) is a chapel in Eksjö Municipality in Sweden, located down country road 28 between Eksjö and Nässjö. Belonging to the Höreda Parish of the Church of Sweden, it was opened in 1927.

The chapel was destroyed in a fire on 27 May 2000, connected to Satanism, but was rebuilt and reopened on 13 May 2001.

== See also ==
- Bäckaby Old Church
