= Nässjö Municipality =

Nässjö Municipality Nässjö kommun
- Municipality
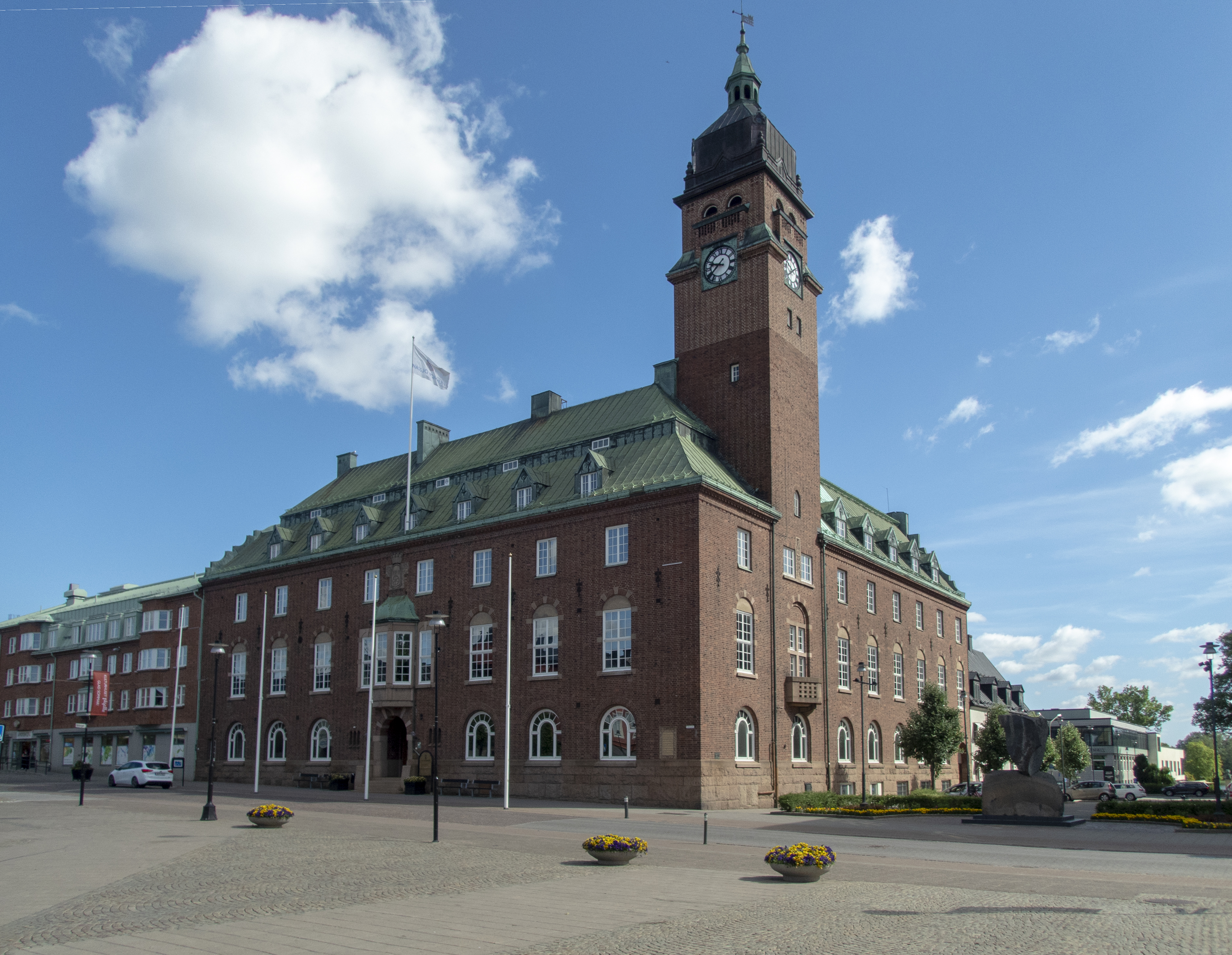
- Nässjö city hall

- Coat of arms

- Coordinates: 57°39′N 14°41′E
- Country: Sweden
- County: Jönköping County
- Seat: Nässjö

Area
  - Total: 988.49 km^{2} (381.66 sq mi)
  - Land: 930.29 km^{2} (359.19 sq mi)
  - Water: 58.2 km^{2} (22.5 sq mi)
- Area as of 1 January 2014.

Population (30 June 2025)
  - Total: 31,446
  - Density: 33.802/km^{2} (87.548/sq mi)
- Time zone: UTC+1 (CET)
  - Summer (DST): UTC+2 (CEST)
- ISO 3166 code: SE
- Province: Småland
- Municipal code: 0682
- Website: www.nassjo.se

Nässjö Municipality (Swedish: Nässjö kommun) is a municipality in Jönköping County, southern Sweden where the town Nässjö is situated.

The present municipality was created in 1971 when the City of Nässjö (instituted in 1914) was amalgamated with five surrounding municipalities.

== Localities ==
There are 11 urban areas (also called a Tätort or locality) in Nässjö Municipality.

In the table the localities are listed according to the size of the population as of December 31, 2005. The municipal seat is in bold characters.

#	Locality	Population
1	**Nässjö**	16,463
2	Bodafors	1,982
2	Forserum	1,982
4	Malmbäck	1,016
5	Anneberg	874
6	Solberga	419
7	Grimstorp	385
8	Fredriksdal	318
9	Äng	301
10	Flisby	215
11	Stensjön	208

== Demographics ==
This is a demographic table based on Nässjö Municipality's electoral districts in the 2022 Swedish general election sourced from SVT's election platform, in turn taken from SCB official statistics.

In total there were 31,732 residents, including 22,963 Swedish citizens of voting age. 43.3% voted for the left coalition and 55.5% for the right coalition. Indicators are in percentage points except population totals and income.

Location	Residents	Citizen adults	Left vote	Right vote	Employed	Swedish parents	Foreign heritage	Income SEK	Degree
Location			%	%					
Anneberg	2,406	1,768	39.8	59.0	84	86	14	25,876	30
Barkeryd/Äng	1,420	1,066	33.1	65.8	90	93	7	27,667	31
Bodafors	2,099	1,432	42.5	56.5	70	72	28	21,693	25
Forserum	1,909	1,401	41.9	56.6	82	82	18	26,313	35
Grimstorp	1,989	1,595	35.5	63.2	85	90	10	26,178	33
Handskerud	2,436	1,804	43.8	55.5	80	77	23	25,965	35
Ingsberg	2,024	1,514	47.3	52.1	87	80	20	26,660	42
Malmbäck	2,104	1,517	38.5	60.4	85	84	16	25,630	30
Norrboda	2,466	1,545	51.0	46.5	68	50	50	21,729	30
Nyhem	2,145	1,553	44.7	54.1	77	73	27	25,579	33
Nässjö C	2,153	1,707	49.3	49.5	74	70	30	20,956	33
Nässjö rural	1,493	1,198	34.5	64.4	88	94	6	29,253	36
Runneryd	2,797	1,660	57.5	40.6	63	35	65	18,648	24
Södergården	2,071	1,563	46.4	52.1	80	75	25	23,945	32
Åker	2,220	1,640	41.1	57.6	89	83	17	28,000	38
Source: SVT

== Sister cities ==
Nässjö has had two sister cities since the 1940s: Brønderslev in Denmark and Eidsberg in Norway.
