= Bäckaby =

- Village
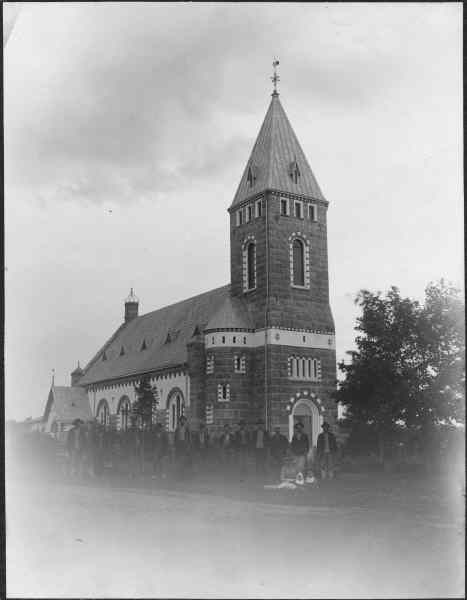
- Photo of the stone church, date unknown

- Location within Sweden
- Coordinates: 57°16′04″N 14°55′33″E
- Country: Sweden
- Province: Småland
- Counties: Jönköping

Population
  - Total: 232
- Time zone: CET
  - Summer (DST): CEDT

Bäckaby is a small village south of Vetlanda in the southern Swedish province of Småland. Bäckaby has a stone church, a kindergarten, a summer café and a small hostel called Plymska Huset. Bäckaby's old church was a wooden church which was moved to Jönköping in 1902. Its oldest parts were from the 14th century. The church was burnt to the ground in 2000.
