= List of towns in Småland =

The following localities in Småland were granted a charter and town privileges from c. 1200 up until 1856:

Town	Year of charter	Description
Kalmar	approximately 1200	the Kalmar union treaty was signed here in 1397
Jönköping	1284	an important trading centre
Växjö	1342	the Diocese of Växjö was established in the 12th century
Vimmerby	circa 1300-1532	a new charter in 1604
Eksjö	1403	and old centre for a thing (assembly) in medieval times. Got its charter from Eric of Pomerania
Västervik	1453	an important port on the east coast. Moved from the old site at Gamleby and established in its present location in 1453
Gränna	1652	founded by count Per Brahe the Younger
Oskarshamn	1856	the market town köping Döderhultsvik got its present name when it was chartered as a city in 1856

The local government reform of 1863 made the individual charters obsolete and created the concept of municipalities in Sweden. The above mentioned localities with town privileges were instituted as municipalities with the title of stad (city/town).

During the 20th century these localities were instituted as städer:

Town	City title	Description
Huskvarna	1911	An industrial suburb of Jönköping, which now has grown together with that city
Nässjö	1914	A railway junction
Tranås	1936	Established as a market town in 1882, got the city title in 1936
Vetlanda	1920	
Värnamo	1920	
Nybro	1932	
Ljungby	1936	
Sävsjö	1947	One of the last city municipalities to be established in Sweden

After 1951 no more städer were instituted and the local government reform of 1971 saw the abolishment of the term, replacing it with kommun for all municipalities, regardless of former status.

Today there is no official definition, but in some contexts (such as Sveriges Nationalatlas) localities with over 10,000 inhabitants are regarded as cities.

== Urban areas in order of size ==
Below is a list of localities in the three administrative counties of Småland with a population greater than 10,000 as of 2005.

1. Jönköping, 84,423
2. Växjö, 59,600
3. Kalmar, 35,710
4. Västervik, 20,694
5. Värnamo, 18,469
6. Oskarshamn, 17,143
7. Nässjö, 14,810
8. Ljungby, 17,286
9. Tranås, 14,017
10. Vetlanda, 12,691
11. Nybro, 12,598
12. Gislaved, 10.091

== See also ==
- Stad (Sweden)
- Municipalities of Sweden
- Urban areas in Sweden
