= Anneberg, Nässjö =

Anneberg
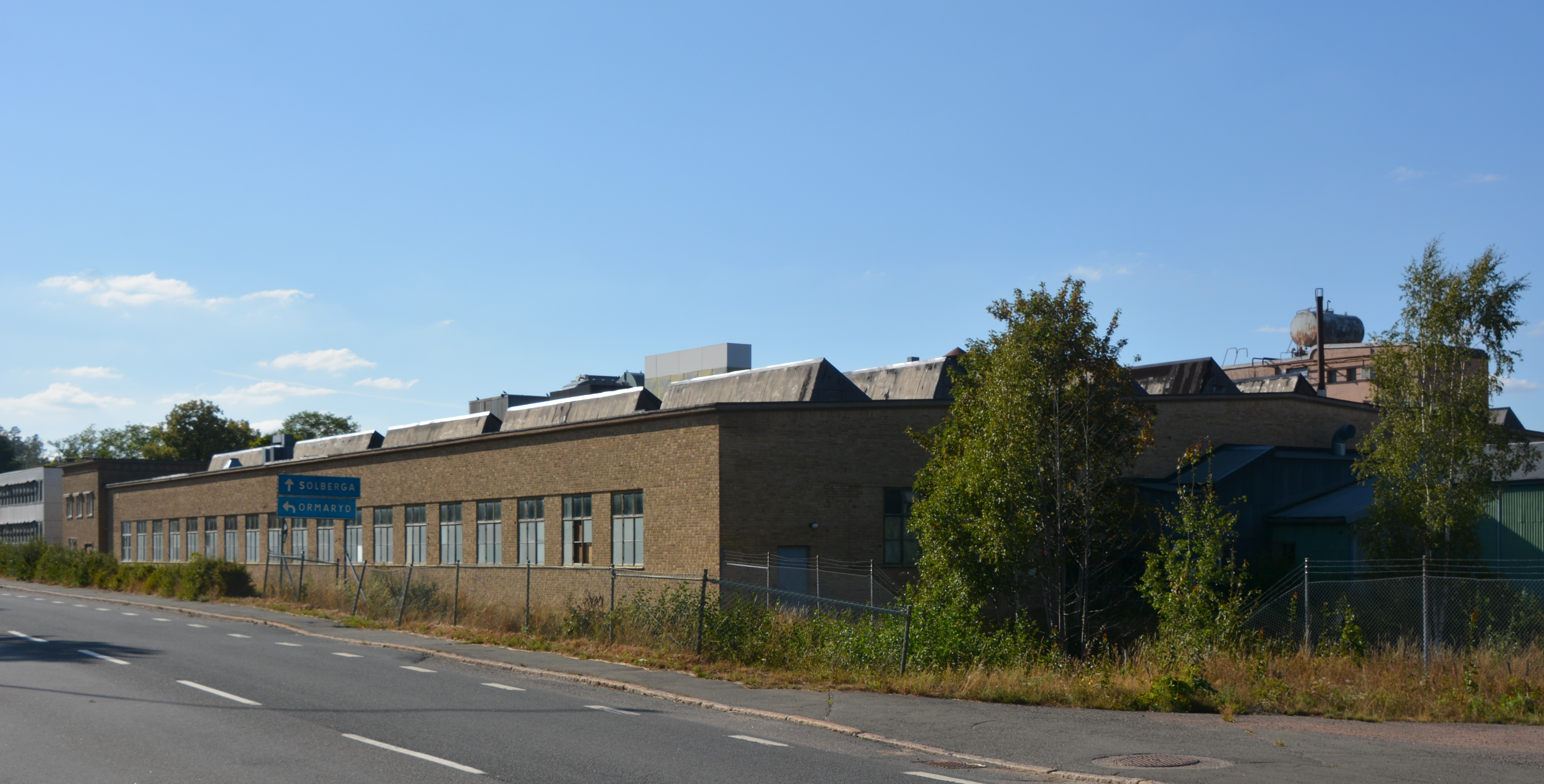

- Location within Jönköping Location within Sweden
- Coordinates: 57°43′27″N 14°48′15″E
- Country: Sweden
- Province: Småland
- County: Jönköping County
- Municipality: Nässjö Municipality

Area
  - Total: 0.98 km^{2} (0.38 sq mi)

Population (31 December 2010)
  - Total: 833
  - Density: 851/km^{2} (2,200/sq mi)
- Time zone: UTC+1 (CET)
  - Summer (DST): UTC+2 (CEST)

Anneberg is a locality situated in Nässjö Municipality, Jönköping County, Sweden with 833 inhabitants in 2010.
