= Flisby =

- Location within Jönköping Location within Sweden
- Coordinates: 57°47′N 14°48′E
- Country: Sweden
- Province: Småland
- County: Jönköping County
- Municipality: Nässjö Municipality

Area
  - Total: 0.75 km^{2} (0.29 sq mi)

Population (31 December 2010)
  - Total: 201
  - Density: 269/km^{2} (700/sq mi)
- Time zone: UTC+1 (CET)
  - Summer (DST): UTC+2 (CEST)

Flisby (Swedish pronunciation: [ˈflǐːsbʏ]) is a locality situated in Nässjö Municipality, Jönköping County, Sweden with 201 inhabitants in 2010.
