= Småländska =

Swedish accent

Småländska (Swedish for "Smålandian") is the accent of Swedish spoken in the historical province of Småland in southern Sweden. The northeastern accents are mainly influenced by the Central Swedish accents while the southwest has been more influenced by Southern Swedish accents, like that of Halland and Scania. Among the most distinguishing features of southern Småländska is the use of a uvular trill [ʀ] (most often realized as a voiced uvular fricative [ʁ]) for the Swedish phoneme /r/. A major isogloss runs straight through Småland in a rough line from the border to Västergötland in the west through Jönköping and to the coastal town of Mönsterås in the east, 40 km north of Kalmar. The isogloss divides the dorsal realizations of /r/ in the south and the transitional area that uses both coronal and dorsal realization encompassing large parts of Västergötland, Östergötland, Värmland and Bohuslän. North of this transitional area only coronal realizations such as alveolar trills [r], alveolar taps [ɾ] and voiced retroflex fricatives [ʐ] are used.

The Småländska dialect is celebrated by the tongue-in-cheek observance of Fössta tossdan i mass.

== More dialects in Sweden ==
- Västgötska
- Elfdalian
- Scanian dialects
