= Hult, Sweden =

Hult
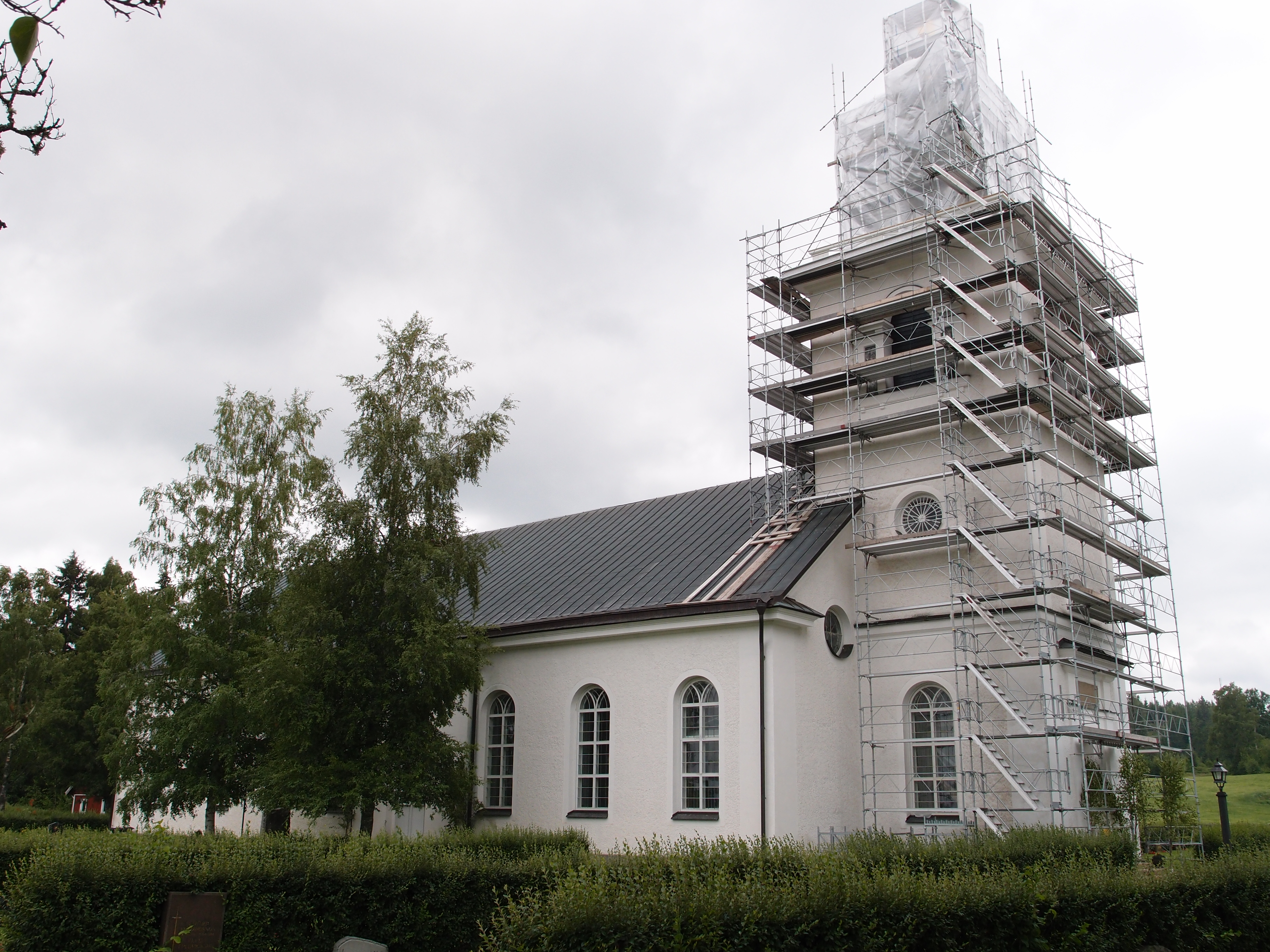

- Location within Jönköping Location within Sweden
- Coordinates: 57°39′N 15°08′E
- Country: Sweden
- Province: Småland
- County: Jönköping County
- Municipality: Eksjö Municipality

Area
  - Total: 0.52 km^{2} (0.20 sq mi)
- Elevation: 311 m (1,020 ft)

Population (31 December 2010)
  - Total: 455
  - Density: 881/km^{2} (2,280/sq mi)
- Time zone: UTC+1 (CET)
  - Summer (DST): UTC+2 (CEST)
- Climate: Dfb

Hult is a locality situated in Eksjö Municipality, Jönköping County, Sweden. It had 455 inhabitants in 2010.

The artist and writer Albert Engström grew up at Hult. He was born on May 12, 1869, in Bäckfall, Lönneberga. He moved to Hult when he was nine years old, because his father Lars Engström got a job as stationmaster. His mother's name was Antigonia. Albert Engström died 71 years old November 16, 1940. He was buried at Hult's graveyard, where his parents are also buried.

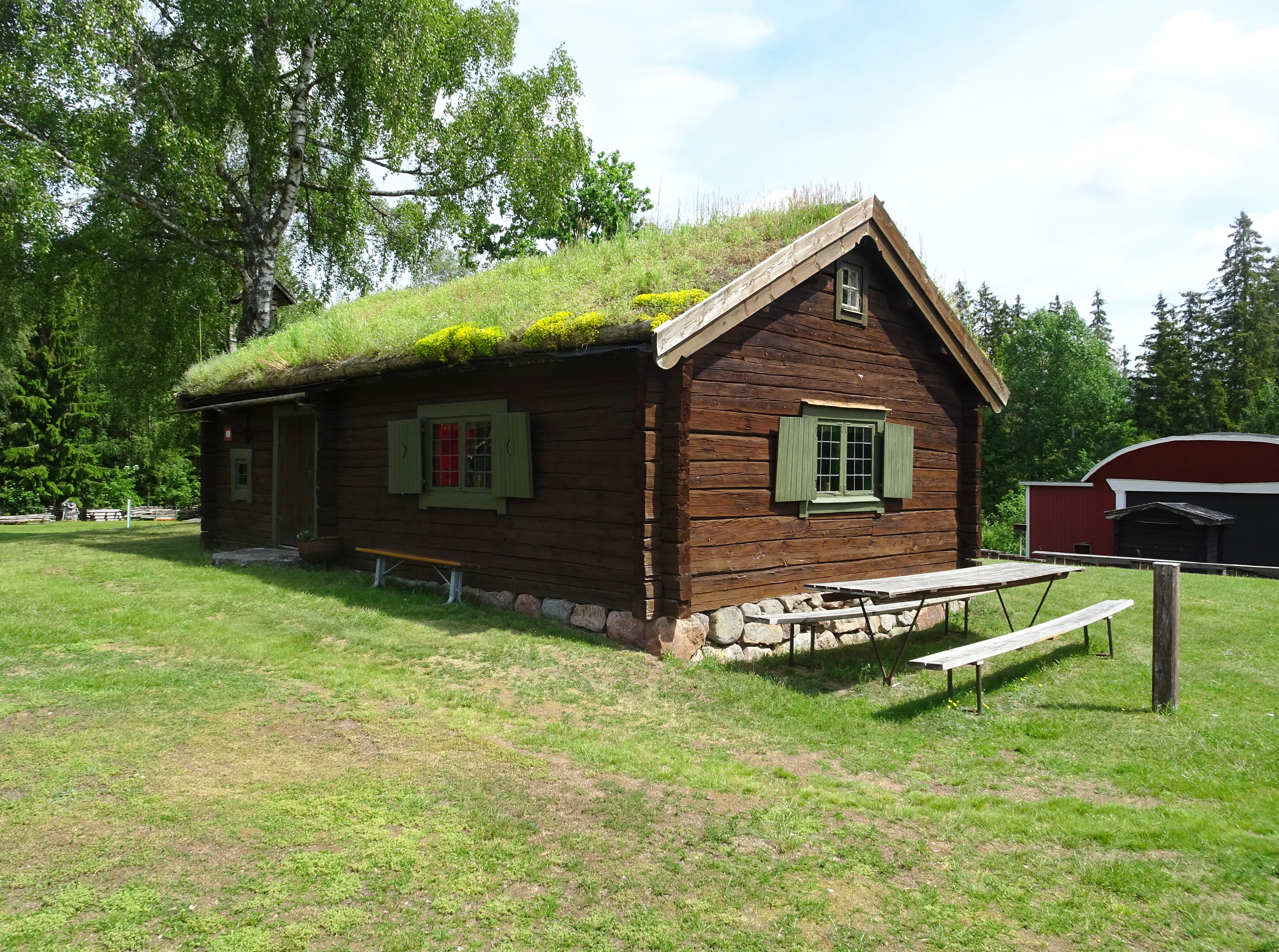
Albert Engströms garden

At Hult lies Albert Engströmsgården which is a traditional homestead and an outdoor museum with old buildings. Albert Engström's childhood home is moved there and in the house there are pictures and texts by Albert Engström. There is also a small exhibition of old clothes from his father. You also find a croft cottage moved from Kongseryd. Albert has written about a lot of people from the district. One of them is Malla and her house has been moved to the homestead too. In the houses and cottages are museum pieces from the district. Near the church is the poor cottage that Albert has written about. The local historical society has restored it into authentic condition. At Albert Engströmsgården there is also an open-air theater. During two weekends every summer there are performances given there. The plays are based on Engstöm's texts and performed by the local amateur theatre group Hultamatörerna.

At Hult there is a railway station that has been in use since 1874.

There is also a kindergarten which is located next to the school which has been in use since it opened at 1914.

At Hult there is a sport club named IFK Hult. The club was founded May 11, 1948. The club has conducted many activities over the years. An activity that is running today is football. The football club has a women's team and a men's team. Gymnastics for children is also an activity that the club offers.
