= Solberga, Nässjö =

Solberga
- Location within Jönköping Location within Sweden
- Coordinates: 57°44′N 14°45′E
- Country: Sweden
- Province: Småland
- County: Jönköping County
- Municipality: Nässjö Municipality

Area
  - Total: 0.67 km^{2} (0.26 sq mi)

Population (31 December 2010)
  - Total: 374
  - Density: 556/km^{2} (1,440/sq mi)
- Time zone: UTC+1 (CET)
  - Summer (DST): UTC+2 (CEST)

Solberga is a locality situated in Nässjö Municipality, Jönköping County, Sweden with 374 inhabitants in 2010.
