= Ingatorp =

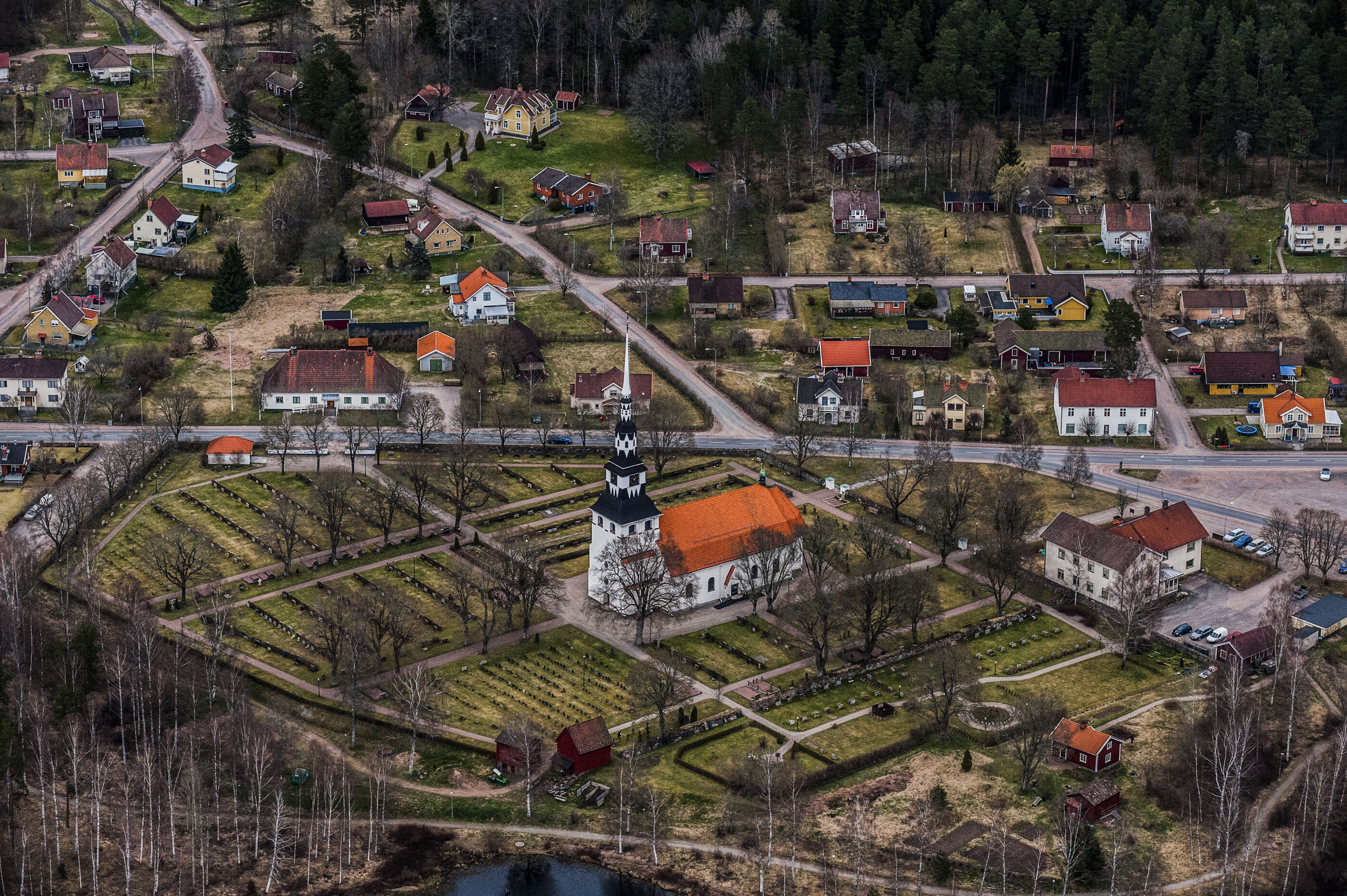

- Location within Jönköping Location within Sweden
- Coordinates: 57°38′N 15°24′E
- Country: Sweden
- Province: Småland
- County: Jönköping County
- Municipality: Eksjö Municipality

Area
  - Total: 0.97 km^{2} (0.37 sq mi)

Population (31 December 2010)
  - Total: 453
  - Density: 469/km^{2} (1,210/sq mi)
- Time zone: UTC+1 (CET)
  - Summer (DST): UTC+2 (CEST)
- Climate: Cfb

Ingatorp is a locality situated in Eksjö Municipality, Jönköping County, Sweden with 453 inhabitants in 2010.
