= Protogine Zone =

Geologic zone in Sweden

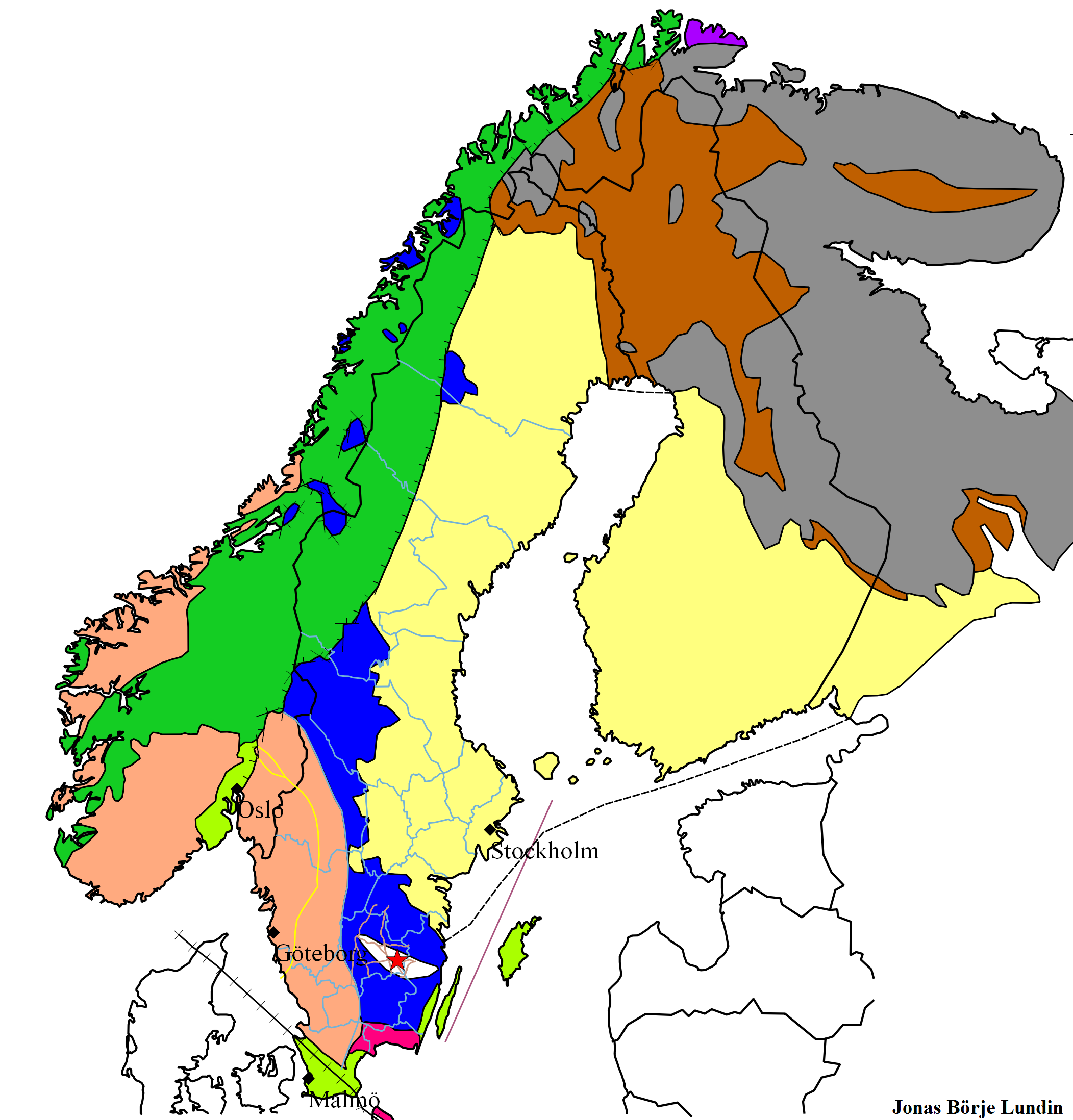
Geological map of the Scandinavian Peninsula and Fennoscandia: the lithological Protogine Zone is the boundary between the Sveconorwegian Orogen (in salmon) and the Transscandinavian Igneous Belt (in blue), the Svecofennian Orogen (in light yellow), and the Blekinge Province (in dark pink).

The Protogine Zone is a geological boundary zone in western Sweden. There are two slightly different definitions of the Protogine Zone. In the lithological definition it forms the limit between the gneisses of western Sweden and the relatively underformed eastern granites. As such it makes up the limit of deformation and metamorphism attributed to the Sveconorwegian orogeny. In the tectonic definition it is a zone of strong deformation that follows roughly the same course as the lithological Protogine Zone. In the two definitions of the Protogine Zone it runs from Scania across Lake Vättern into the upper course of Klarälven and then into Norway. The tectonic Protogine Zone has anastomosing branches and splits south of Lake Vättern into various diverging arms. The two westernmost of these arms follow the valleys of the Nissan and Lagan rivers. A more eastern branch is reflected in the alignment of the lakes Rusken, Rymmen and Möckeln.

The origin of the Protogine Zone has been traced to the Mesoproterozoic when it was a zone of weakness in the crust. About 1575–1562 Ma ago the Progine Zone was intruded by mafic magma during the same time spans as Rapakivi granites intruded more easterly domains in Fennoscandia. Later 1224–1215 and ca. 1204 Ma ago the progine zone was subject to extensional tectonics perhaps being a back-arc basin. The Protogine Zone obtained its final configuration during the Sveconorwegian orogeny 1130–950 Ma ago.
