= Solberga, Österåker =

Solberga
- Location within Stockholm Location within Sweden Location within European Union
- Coordinates: 59°30′N 18°21′E
- Country: Sweden
- Province: Uppland
- County: Stockholm County
- Municipality: Österåker Municipality

Area
  - Total: 1.08 km^{2} (0.42 sq mi)

Population (31 December 2020)
  - Total: 528
  - Density: 489/km^{2} (1,270/sq mi)
- Time zone: UTC+1 (CET)
  - Summer (DST): UTC+2 (CEST)

Solberga is a locality situated in Österåker Municipality, Stockholm County, Sweden with 409 inhabitants in 2010.
