= HSwMS Småland =

Several ships of the Swedish Navy have been named HSwMS Småland, named after the Småland province:

- Småland (1680) was a ship of the line launched in 1680 as Drottning Hedvig Eleonora and renamed Sverige in 1694 and Småland the same year
- Småland (1688) was a ship of the line launched in 1688, renamed Wenden in 1694 and sunk in 1734
- Småland (1749) was a galley launched in 1749
- HSwMS Småland (J19) was a Halland-class destroyer launched in 1952 and decommissioned in 1984
