= Nissan (river) =

River in Sweden

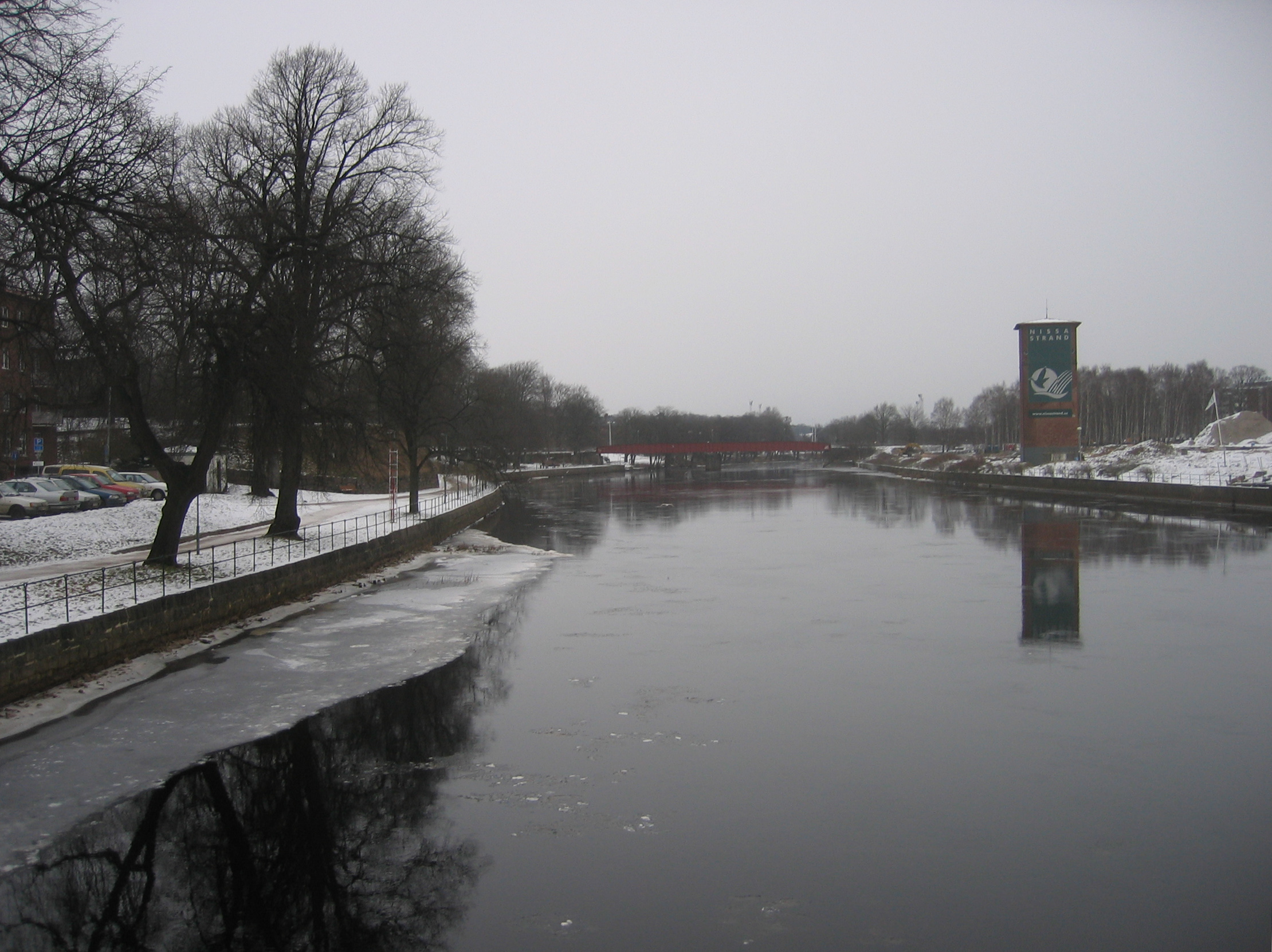
- The Nissan River running through Halmstad, January 2005

Location
- Country: Sweden

Physical characteristics
- Mouth: Laholmsbukten in Kattegatt
  - location: Halmstad Municipality, Halland County
  - coordinates: 56°39′20″N 12°51′00″E
- Length: 200 km (120 mi)
- Basin size: 2,685.7 km^{2} (1,037.0 sq mi)
- Discharge
  - average: 41 m^{3}/s (1,400 cu ft/s)
  - maximum: 155 m^{3}/s (5,500 cu ft/s)

The Nissan (Swedish pronunciation: [ˈnɪ̂sːan]) is a 200 km long river in southwest Sweden. It ends in Halmstad, where it flows into the Kattegat. The straight middle and upper course of Nissan follows a branch of the Protogine Zone – a zone of crustal weakness in western Sweden. Nissan drains the western part of the South Småland peneplain.
