= Eksjö Municipality =

Eksjö Municipality Eksjö kommun
- Municipality
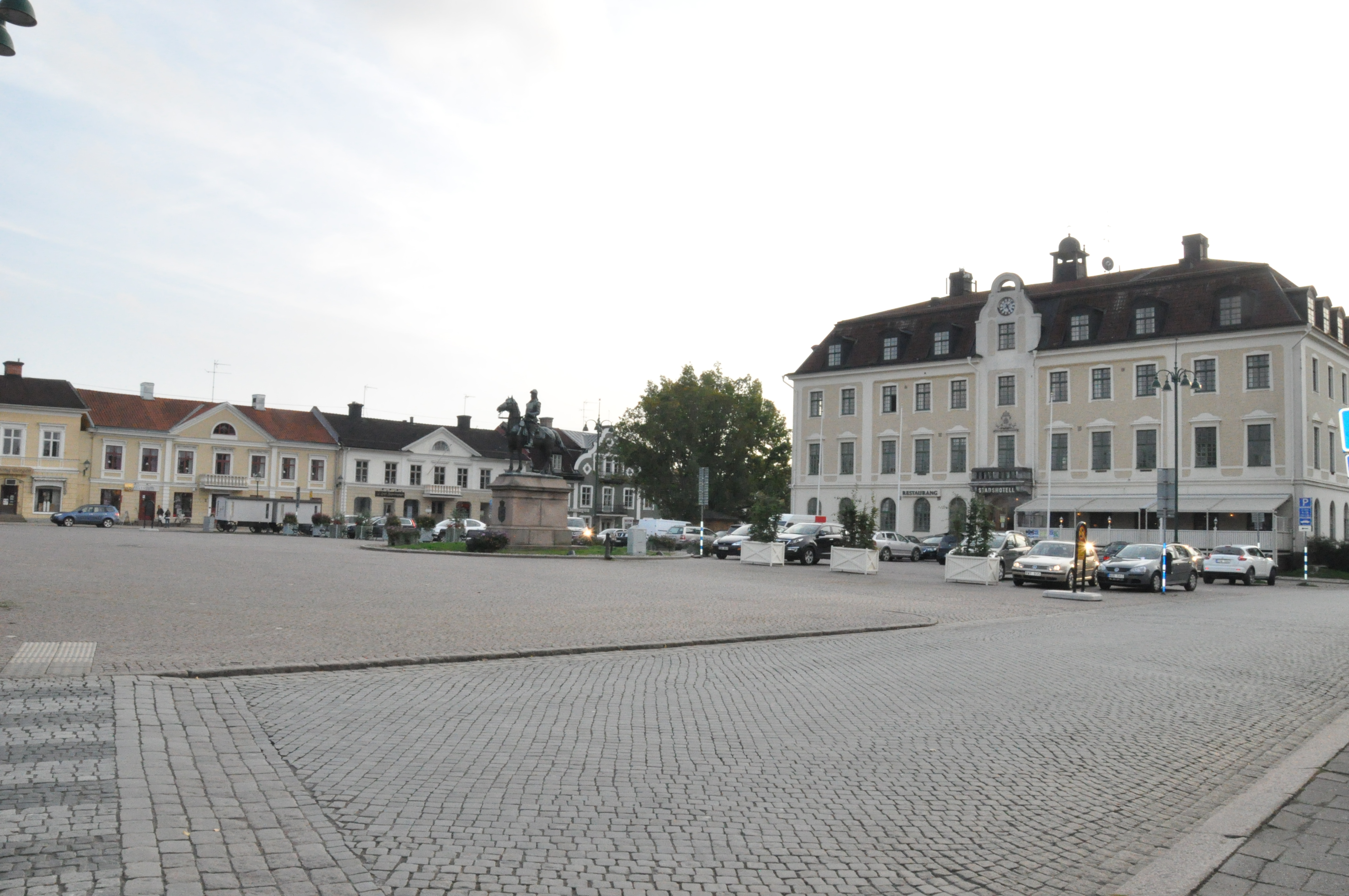

- Flag Coat of arms

- Coordinates: 57°40′N 14°58′E
- Country: Sweden
- County: Jönköping County
- Seat: Eksjö

Area
  - Total: 873.29 km^{2} (337.18 sq mi)
  - Land: 799.48 km^{2} (308.68 sq mi)
  - Water: 73.81 km^{2} (28.50 sq mi)
- Area as of 1 January 2014.

Population (30 June 2025)
  - Total: 17,749
  - Density: 22.201/km^{2} (57.499/sq mi)
- Time zone: UTC+1 (CET)
  - Summer (DST): UTC+2 (CEST)
- ISO 3166 code: SE
- Province: Småland
- Municipal code: 0686
- Website: www.eksjo.se

Eksjö Municipality (Swedish: Eksjö kommun) is a municipality in Jönköping County, southern Sweden, where the town Eksjö is seat.

The present municipality was created in 1971 when the former City of Eksjö was amalgamated with three neighboring municipalities.

== Localities ==
There are 6 urban areas (also called a Tätort or locality) in Eksjö Municipality.

In the table the localities are listed according to the size of the population as of December 31, 2005. The municipal seat is in bold characters.

#	Locality	Population
1	**Eksjö**	9,676
2	Mariannelund	1,554
3	Ingatorp	501
4	Hult	473
5	Hjältevad	345
6	Bruzaholm	274

== Demographics ==
This is a demographic table based on Eksjö Municipality's electoral districts in the 2022 Swedish general election sourced from SVT's election platform, in turn taken from SCB official statistics.

In total there were 17,823 residents, including 13,389 Swedish citizens of voting age. 44.2% voted for the left coalition and 53.9% for the right coalition. Indicators are in percentage points except population totals and income.

Location	Residents	Citizen adults	Left vote	Right vote	Employed	Swedish parents	Foreign heritage	Income SEK	Degree
Location			%	%					
Blåsippan	1,360	885	50.8	45.2	68	58	42	20,500	36
Gamla Stan	2,033	1,519	53.0	44.2	74	68	32	20,226	38
Grevhagen	1,899	1,421	45.5	52.5	84	84	16	26,612	44
Hult	988	756	42.4	56.4	85	90	10	26,812	34
Höreda	1,530	1,208	38.5	60.3	91	96	4	28,873	36
Ingatorp	1,658	1,284	39.9	59.0	73	78	22	21,340	23
Kaffekullen	1,216	951	38.8	60.4	90	93	7	29,799	46
Kvarnarp	1,462	1,104	45.6	52.9	87	86	14	27,612	40
Mariannelund	1,938	1,347	46.1	51.6	73	77	23	21,475	25
Norrtull	1,482	1,117	47.0	51.1	82	82	18	26,457	42
Sjöängen	2,257	1,797	40.0	58.5	81	83	17	26,122	45
Source: SVT

== Natives ==
Albert Engström (1869-1940) was an author, poet and drawer and subsequently member of the Swedish Academy, who grew up in a small village outside of the city Eksjö.

== Sister cities ==
- Marstal, in Denmark
- Barlinek, in Poland

(See sister city.)
