= Småland =

Historical province of Sweden

Coordinates: 57°06′04″N 14°53′53″E

- Historical province
- Flag Coat of arms

- Country: Sweden
- Land: Götaland
- Counties: Kronoberg, Kalmar, Jönköping (partly), Halland (partly), Östergötland (partly)

Area
  - Total: 29,400 km^{2} (11,400 sq mi)

Population (31 December 2023)
  - Total: 780,489
  - Density: 26.5/km^{2} (68.8/sq mi)

Ethnicity
  - Language: Swedish
  - Dialect: Småländska
  - Demonym: Smålänning

Culture
  - Flower: Twinflower
  - Animal: Otter
  - Bird: Song thrush
- Time zone: UTC+1 (CET)
  - Summer (DST): UTC+2 (CEST)
- Postal codes: 28500-28799, 33000–34999, 35000–36999, 38000–39999, 55000–57999, 59000–59999 (shared with Östergötland)
- Area codes: 0370-0372; 0433; 0459; 0470–0478; 0480–0493

Småland (Swedish: [ˈsmǒːland]) is a historical province (landskap) in southern Sweden. Småland borders Blekinge, Scania, Halland, Västergötland, Östergötland and the island Öland in the Baltic Sea. The name Småland literally means 'small lands', referring to many small historic provinces from which it was composed. The Latinized form Smolandia has been used in other languages. The highest point in Småland is Tomtabacken, at 377 metres (1,237 ft). In terms of total area, Småland is similar in size to Belgium.

== Administration ==
Whilst the traditional provinces of Sweden no longer serve any governmental purpose per se, they do retain historical and cultural importance. The province of Småland today is divided almost entirely into the three administrative counties of Jönköping, Kalmar, and Kronoberg. Some few small portions of historic Småland are situated in Halland and Östergötland Counties.

== Heraldry ==
The current coat of arms, granted in 1569, displays a rampant red lion carrying a crossbow, all on a golden background. The arms may be surmounted by a ducal coronet. The blazon in English would be, "Or, a lion rampant gules, langued and armed azure, holding in its front paws a crossbow of the second, bowed and stringed Sable with a bolt argent."

== Population ==
The population of Småland was 780,389 as of 31 December 2023.

== Geography ==
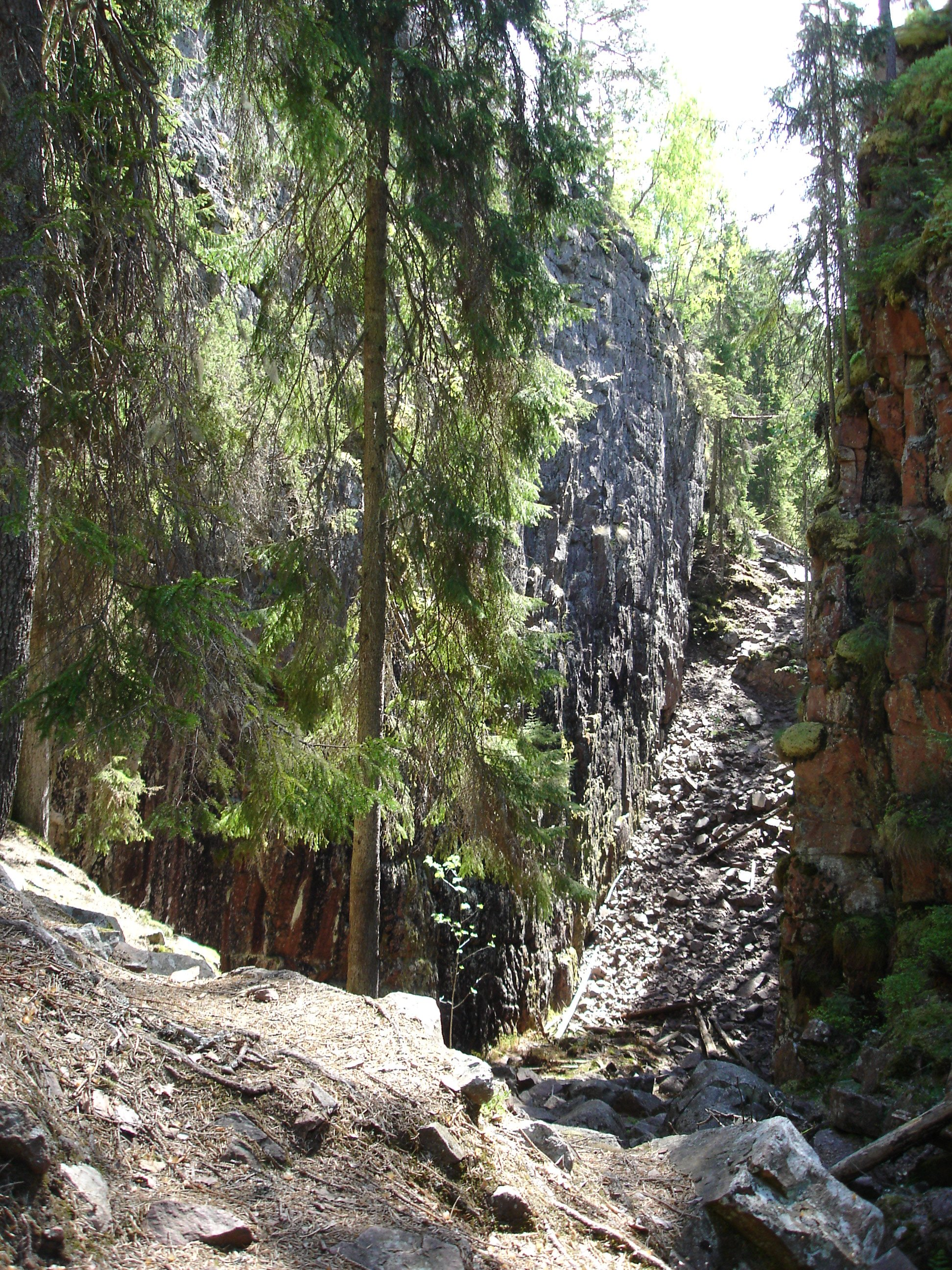
An image from a canyon in the forested Småland

The land is dominated by a forested high plain in which the soil is mixed with sand and small boulders, making it barren in all but the coastal areas and unsuited for agriculture except in certain locations, most notably the Kalmar plains. The province is rich in lakes and bogs. The coast is marked by bays in the north (with an island archipelago offshore) and cultivated flatlands in the south. In total, cultivated land covers 14%, meadows cover 7%, and forests cover 50% of the surface of the province. Other than lacking deep valleys, the landscape is similar to the Norrland terrain found further north in Sweden.

The largest towns are Jönköping in the north-west, Växjö in the south, and Kalmar on the east coast near Öland Island.

=== Terrain ===
Småland comprises the central, eastern, and southern parts of the South Swedish highlands. In detail, the topography of Småland is a series of flat surfaces built upon or deformed by a geological dome. The elevated terrain thought to be a buckle formed as result of far-away forces transmitted to Sweden. The main surfaces are the Sub-Cambrian peneplain, the South Småland peneplain and the "200 m peneplain". These surfaces and others are arranged in a stepped sequence called a piedmonttreppen. In eastern Småland, the Sub-Cambrian peneplain dips gently to the sea. (Note: Then the surface has a continuation as unconformity beneath Öland.) To the West, this part of the Sub-Cambrian peneplain terminates along a north–south escarpment (running slightly to the east of Växjö) that separates it from other flat surfaces. Central and northwestern Småland contains strings of isolated hills.

The lakes and rivers of Småland are associated to zones of weak rock, either fractured, weathered, or both. The many lakes in Småland owe their existence to the creation of basins through the stripping of an irregular mantle of weathered rock by glacial erosion. The Lagan and the Nissan drain western Småland, following for most of their courses zones of weak rock associated with the Protogine Zone. Rusken, Rymmen, and Möckeln lakes are aligned with a more eastern branch of the Protogine Zone. Canyons cut into the bedrock are common in central and northern Småland, with the area near Mörlunda containing various particularly narrow (<50 m) canyons. (Note: During deglaciation meltwater from the Weichsel ice flowed through the canyons contributing to their formation.)

=== Climate ===
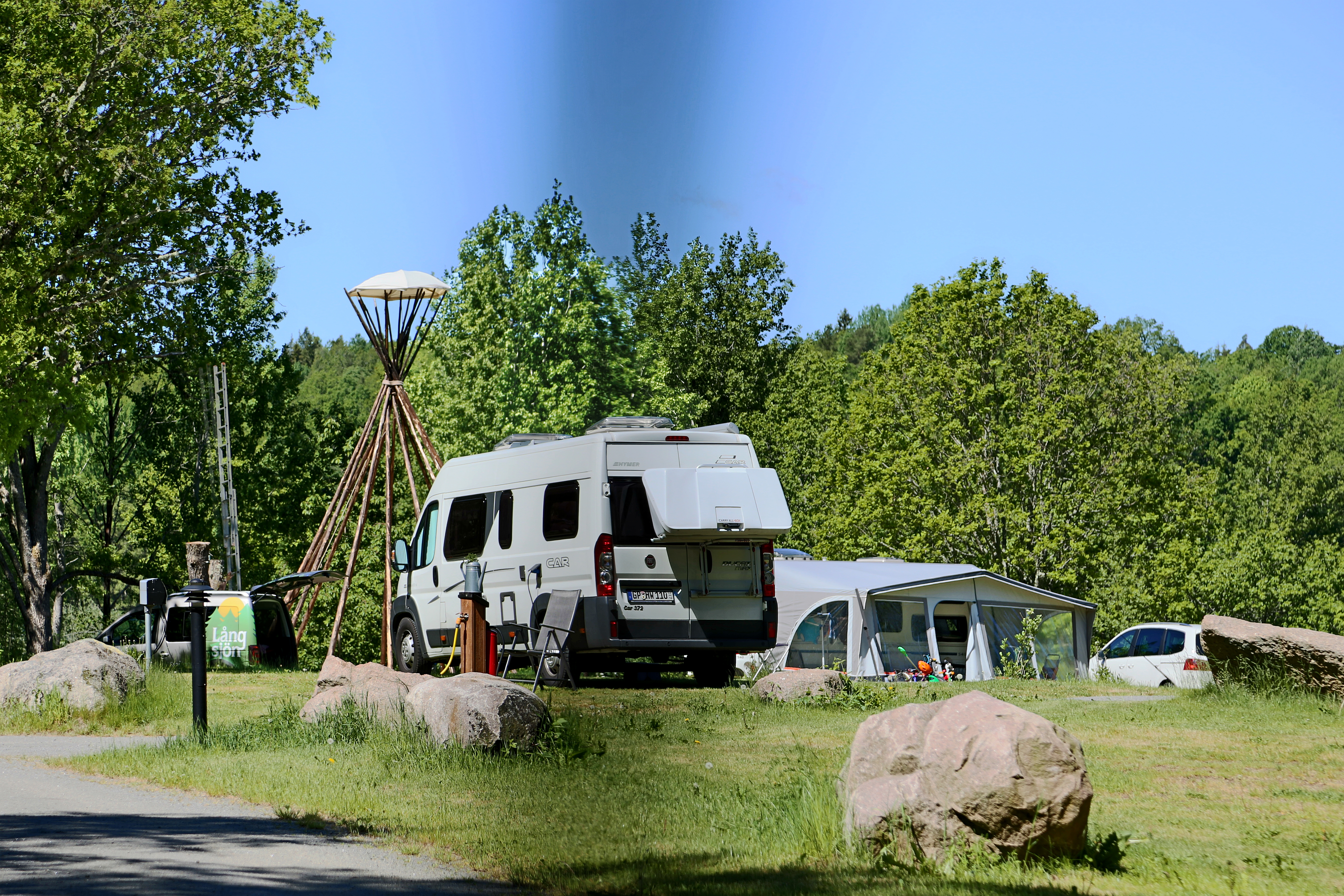
Camping site in Småland

The climate of Småland is divided between the oceanic climate of coastal areas such as Kalmar and the humid continental climate of the interior higher areas such as Jönköping. Southern interior areas such as Växjö have similar oceanic climates such as the coastline. However, temperature average differences between areas are relatively small, since Småland lies in the continental/oceanic transition zone. Summer daytime averages are similar throughout the province, since all three major urban areas are on average around 22 °C (72 °F) with daytime winter temperatures hovering around the freezing point. The slightly colder nights averaging −5 °C (23 °F) in Jönköping are in keeping with its continental classification. The locality of Målilla has the Swedish and Scandinavian all-time highest-measured temperature with 38 °C (100 °F) on 1 June 1947.

== History ==
The area was probably populated in the Stone Age from the south, by people moving along the coast up to Kalmar. Småland was populated by Stone Age peoples by at least 6000 BC, since the Alby People are known to have crossed the ice bridge across the Kalmar Strait at that time.

It is named Småland ("small lands") because it was an aggrupation of a dozen little (yet largely independent) territories: Kinda (today a part of Östergötland), Tveta, Vista, Vedbo, Tjust, Sevede, Aspeland, Handbörd, Möre, Värend, Finnveden, and Njudung. Each "small land" had its own law in the Viking age and early Middle Ages and could declare itself neutral in wars that Sweden was involved in—at least if the King had no army present at the parliamentary debate. Around 1350, during the reign of Magnus Eriksson, the first national law code was introduced in Sweden and the historic provinces lost much of their old autonomy.

The city of Kalmar is one of the oldest cities of Sweden. In the medieval period it was the southernmost and the third largest city in Sweden, when it was a center for export of iron, which, in many cases, was handled by German merchants. At that time, Scania and Blekinge were not part of Sweden.

Småland was the center of several peasant rebellions. The most nearly successful was the Dackefejden led by Nils Dacke in 1542 and 1543. When officials of king Gustav Vasa were assaulted and murdered, the king sent small expeditions to pacify the area; but all failed. Dacke was the virtual ruler of large parts of Småland during that Winter, though much troubled by a blockade of supplies, before finally being defeated by larger forces attacking from both Västergötland and Östergötland. He famously defended Kronoberg Castle (now ruined) but was shot while trying to escape to then Danish-ruled Blekinge.

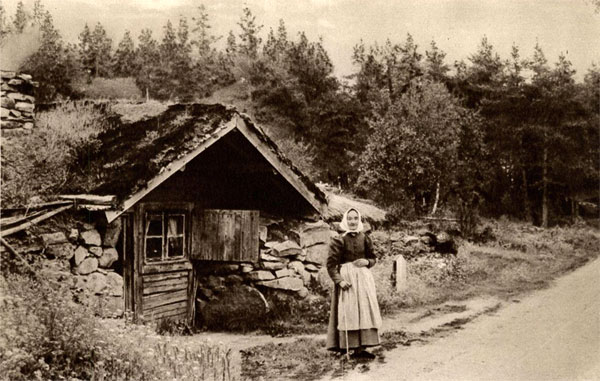
A backstuga in småland (c. 1900)

A portion of Småland called the Kingdom of Crystal is known for its many glassworks and can be traced back to the 18th century.

During the 17th and 18 Century Småland saw Christian revival break out, leading to an increase of entrepreneurship, church building and the sending out of missionaries all over the world. To this day, the people of Småland are affected by this activity.

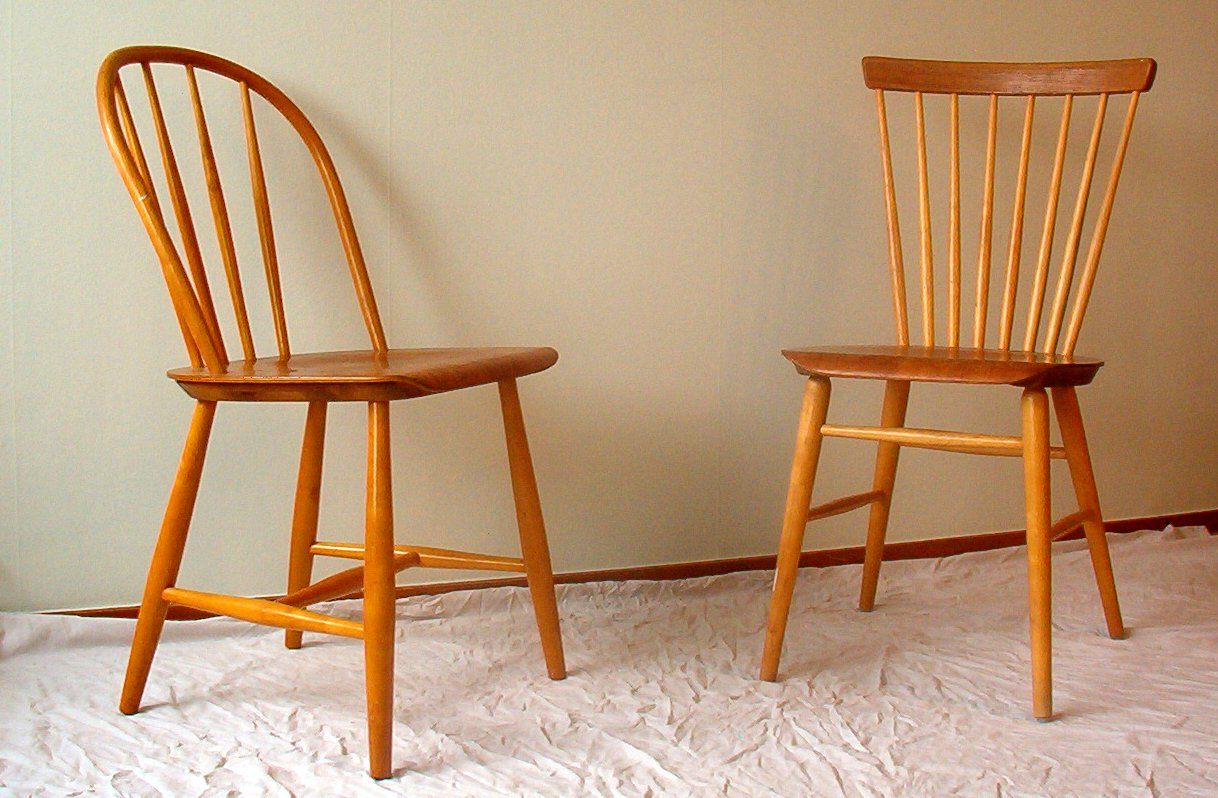
Traditional Windsor chairs are manufactured in great numbers in Småland.

In the 19th century, Småland was afflicted by social and economic turbulence and poverty, and it had substantial emigration to North America. 4,300 Swedish emigrants were recruited to settle in Stamford, Texas, by the family network of the first Swedish emigrant to Texas, Swante M. Swenson, who came from Jönköping.

The furniture company IKEA was founded in the Småland town of Älmhult.

Overnight between 8 and 9 January 2005 the province suffered serious damage from the storm Gudrun.

=== Historical cities ===
Towns with former city status were: Eksjö (chartered around 1400), Gränna (1652), Huskvarna (1911), Jönköping (1284), Kalmar (approximately 1100), Ljungby (1936), Nybro (1932), Nässjö (1914), Oskarshamn (1856), Sävsjö (1947), Tranås (1919), Vetlanda (1920), Vimmerby (approximately 1400), Värnamo (1920), Västervik (approximately 1200), Växjö (1342)

=== National parks ===
Småland has four national parks:

- Store Mosse
- Norra Kvill
- Blå Jungfrun
- Åsnen

=== Religion ===
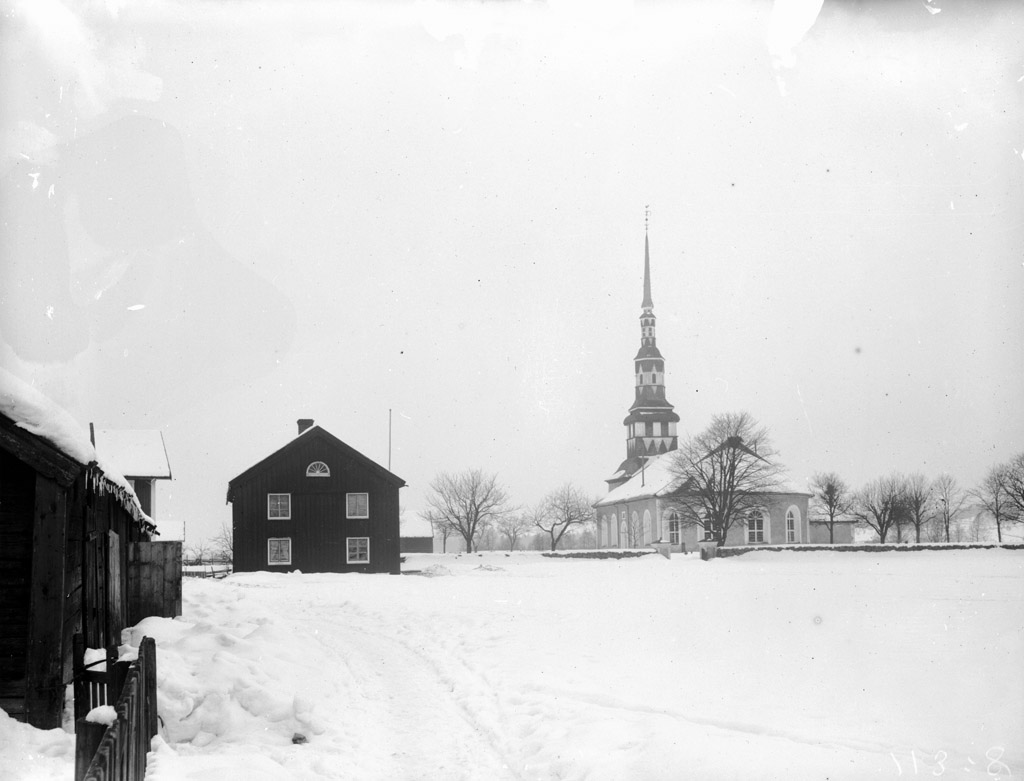
Ingatorp Old Church, Småland, Sweden, c. 1895

Compared to much of Sweden, Småland has a higher level of religious intensity and church participation.

In terms of Lutheran ecclesiastical boundaries, most of the province encompasses the diocese of Växjö. Parts of northern Småland are in the diocese of Linköping.

Småland is known for its free church congregations in Jönköping County. Most of Kalmar County and Kronoberg County have few or no free church congregations.

Politically Småland is the strongest province for the Christian Democrats (KD), and both of the last two leaders of the party - Göran Hägglund and Alf Svensson live in Jönköping Municipality in northern Småland.

=== Notable people ===
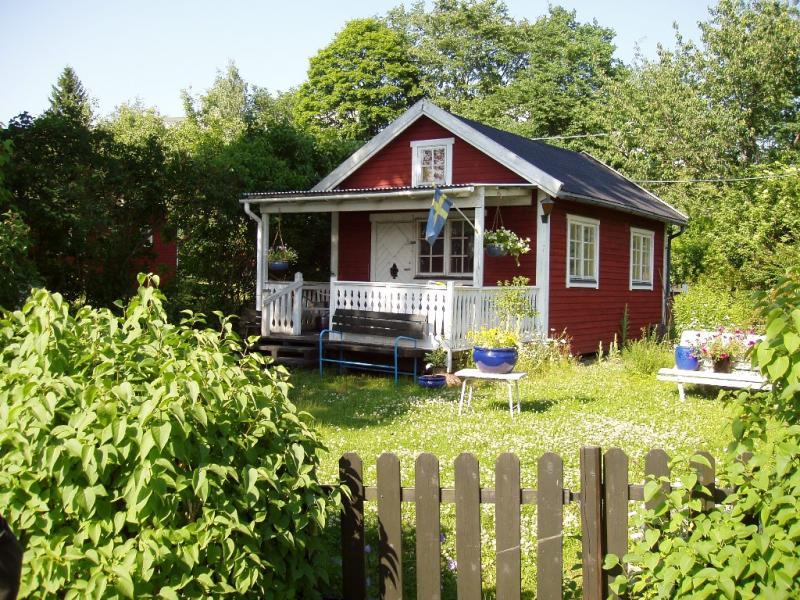
Farmhouses in Småland are typically red with white corners.

Botanist Carl Linnaeus (1707–1778), often called the father of taxonomy or "the flower-king", was born in Älmhult, Småland. The twinflower's genus (Linnaea) was named by Dutch botanist Jan Frederik Gronovius in honor of Linnaeus because of it being his favorite plant. The flower has since become Småland's provincial flower.

Ingvar Kamprad (1926–2018), founder of furniture retailer IKEA, was also from Älmhult. Some IKEA locations offer a children play area named after Småland.

== Education ==
Småland is home to Linnaeus University, located in Växjö and Kalmar, and Jönköping University.

=== Literature ===
The Swedish emigration to North America during the 19th century, is best depicted in a suite of novels by author Vilhelm Moberg, which is also the basis for the musical Kristina from Duvemåla created by Benny Andersson and Björn Ulvaeus of ABBA fame.

In her writing, children's book author Astrid Lindgren often portrayed scenes from her own childhood, growing up on a farm in Småland.

=== Smålandians ===
In the 20th century, Småland has been known for its high level of entrepreneurship and low unemployment, especially in the Gnosjö region.

Old Swedish encyclopedia Nordisk familjebok describes the inhabitants of Småland as follows:

the Smålandian is by nature awake and smart, diligent and hard-working, yet compliant, cunning and crafty, which gives him the advantage of being able to move through life with little means.

A running joke local to Sweden, is that Smålandians are very economical, ranging from modestly frugal to utterly cheap. Ingvar Kamprad, founder of IKEA said that the Smålandians are seen as the Scotsmen of Sweden.

=== Language ===
The local language is a Swedish dialect known as Småländska (Smalandian). This may in turn be separated in two main branches, with the northern related to the Götaland dialects and the southern to the Scanian dialects.

== Sub-divisions ==
For details, see: Districts of Småland

=== Small lands ===
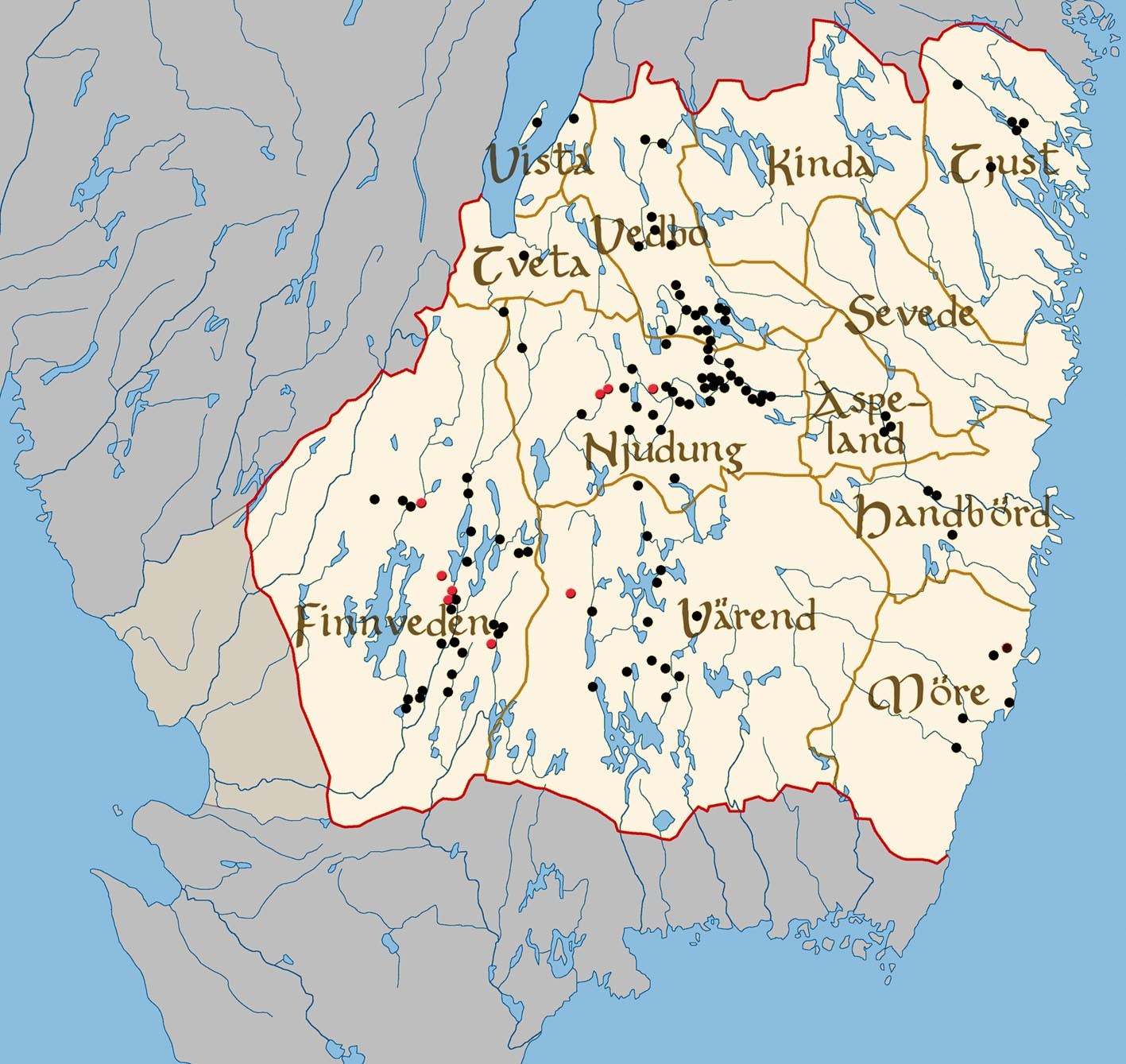
The small lands of Småland. The black and red spots indicate runestones. The red spots indicate runestones telling of long voyages.

- Aspeland
- Finnveden
- Handbörd
- Kinda (today a part of Östergötland)
- Möre
- Njudung
- Sevede
- Tjust
- Tveta
- Vedbo Southern Hundred (sv)
- Vista
- Värend

After the unification of Sweden, around 800–1200 AD, Småland was for consistency divided into chartered cities and into hundreds.

=== Hundreds ===
The historical sub-divisions of all Sweden's provinces were through hundreds (Swedish: härad). These were Småland's hundreds:

- Allbo Hundred
- Aspeland Hundred
- Handbörd Hundred
- Kinda Hundred
- Kinnevald Hundred
- Konga Hundred
- Mo Hundred
- Möre Northern Hundred
- Möre Southern Hundred
- Norrvidinge Hundred
- Sevede Hundred
- Stranda Hundred
- Sunnerbo Hundred
- Tjust Northern Hundred
- Tjust Southern Hundred
- Tunalän Hundred
- Tveta Hundred
- Uppvidinge Hundred
- Vedbo Northern Hundred
- Vedbo Southern Hundred
- Vista Hundred
- Västbo Hundred
- Västra Hundred
- Ydre Hundred
- Östbo Hundred
- Östra Hundred

=== Towns in Småland ===
List of towns in Småland, Sweden

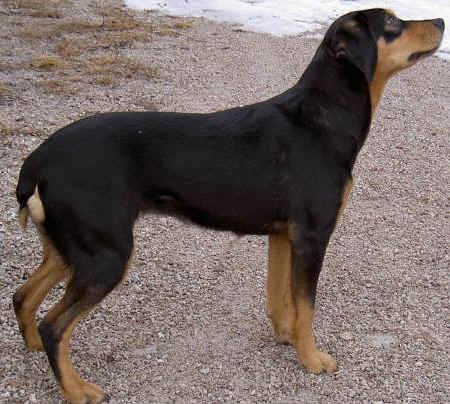
A Smålandsstövare (Smaland hound)

== Things named after Småland ==
- HSwMS Småland, several ships of the Swedish navy
  - in particular, HSwMS Småland (J19), a destroyer
- Smålandsnytt, a local news programme
- Smålandsstövare, a dog breed originating in Småland
- Smolan, Kansas, a city in Saline county, named after Småland
- Småland Nation, student group on Lunds university.
- The children's play area in IKEA stores

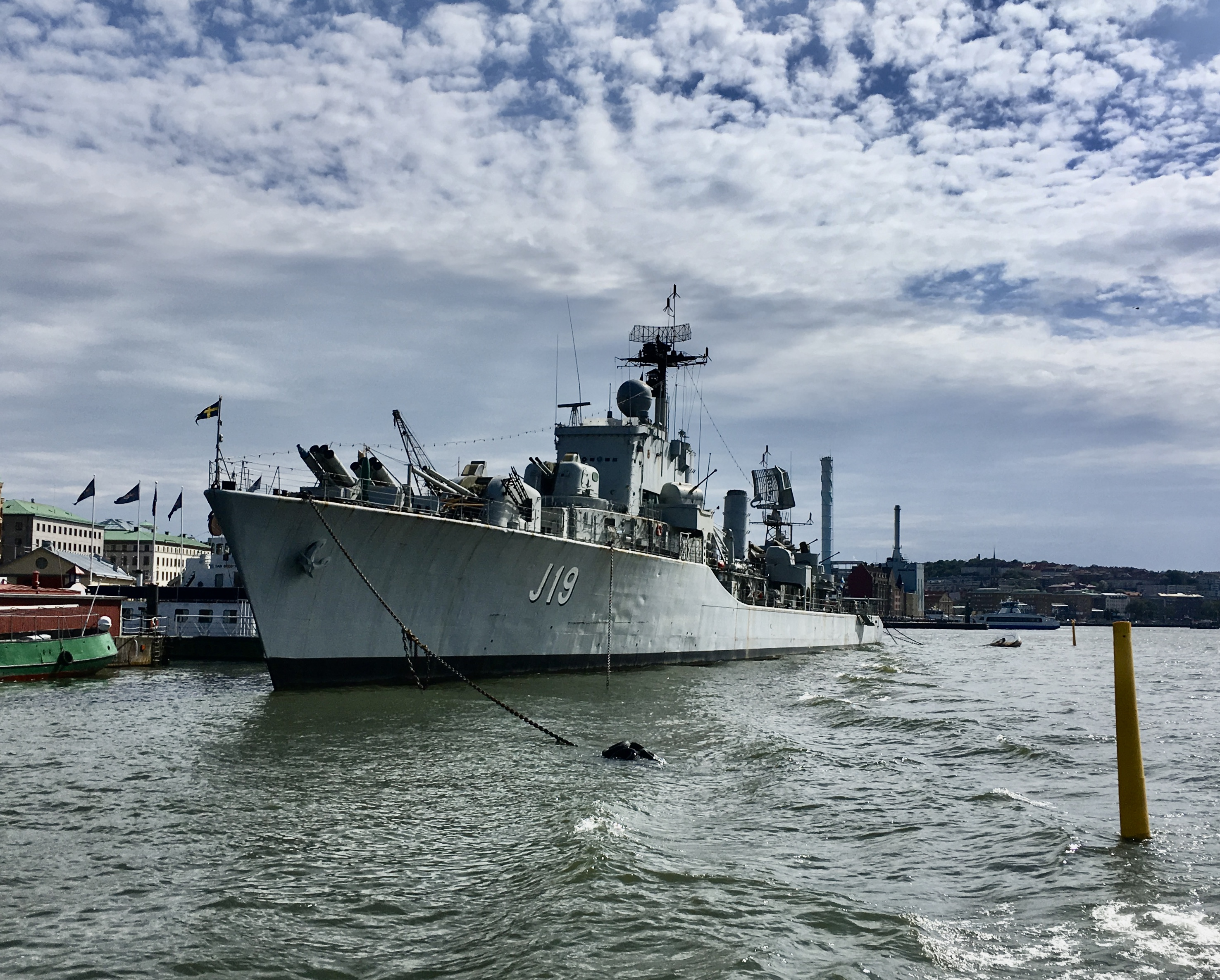
HSwMS Småland (J19)

== Sports ==
Football in the province is administered by Smålands Fotbollförbund.

== See also ==
- Småland and the islands
- Årsgång
- Jönköping University
