= Komedianten =

Cultural centre in Varberg, Sweden

Coordinates: 57°6′30.74″N 12°15′5.84″E

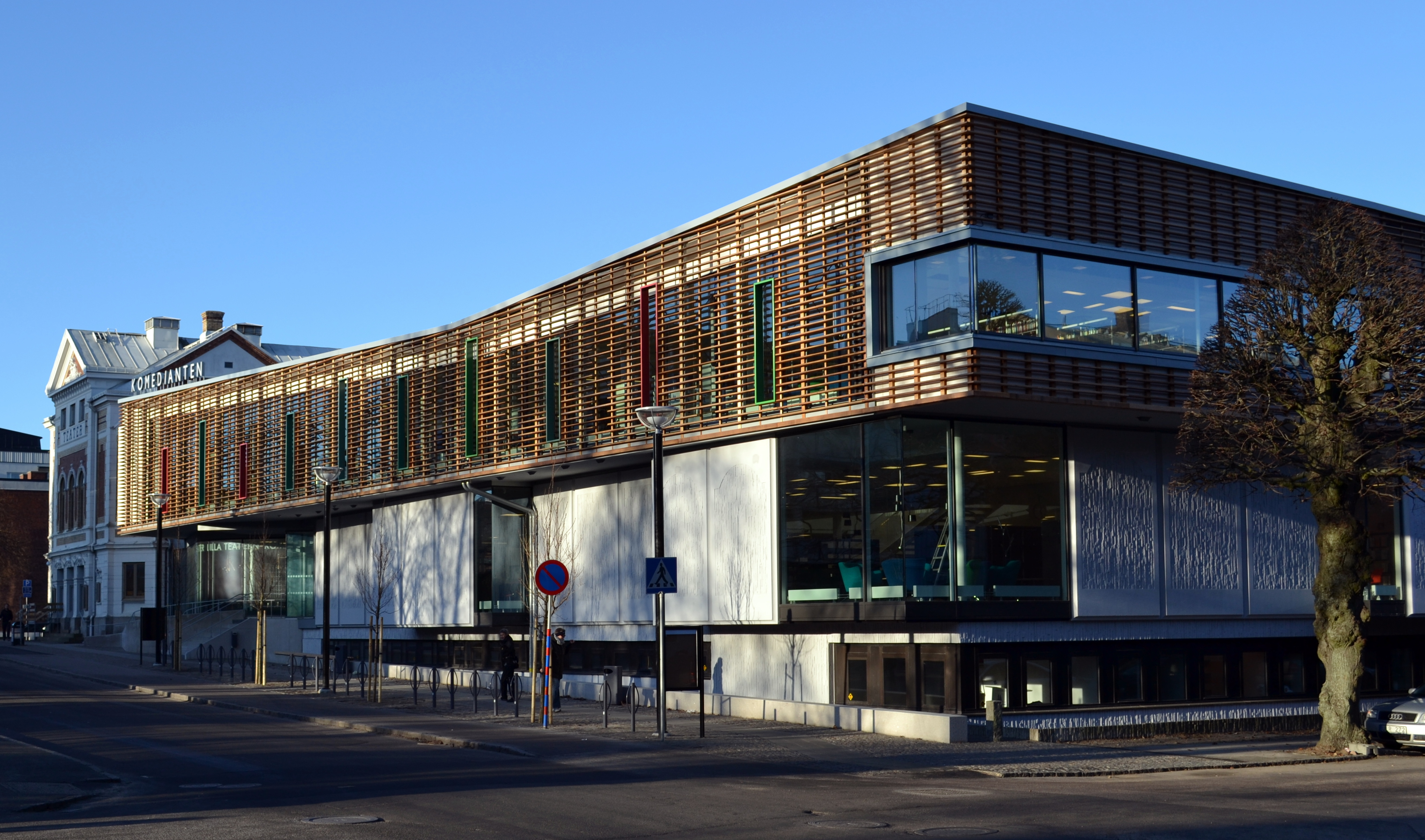
Komedianten.

Komedianten ("The Trouper") is a cultural centre with a public library, art gallery and performing operations in Varberg, Sweden. The library is the main public library in Varberg Municipality, and also the municipality's largest public library. The library has been at its present location since 1981. In 2010–2012, the library was expanded with an additional floor and converted to the current arts center, which was inaugurated on 14 January 2012.

The name comes from the block which is named Komedianten, because of the theatre that was built on the property next to the cultural centre in 1895. Since 2012, the theatre is integrated with the cultural centre. A trouper (Swedish: komediant) was formerly a traveling actor, and the word was considered by the municipal executive board in Varberg to be an appropriate name for the cultural center, with a clear reference to world of culture.

== History ==
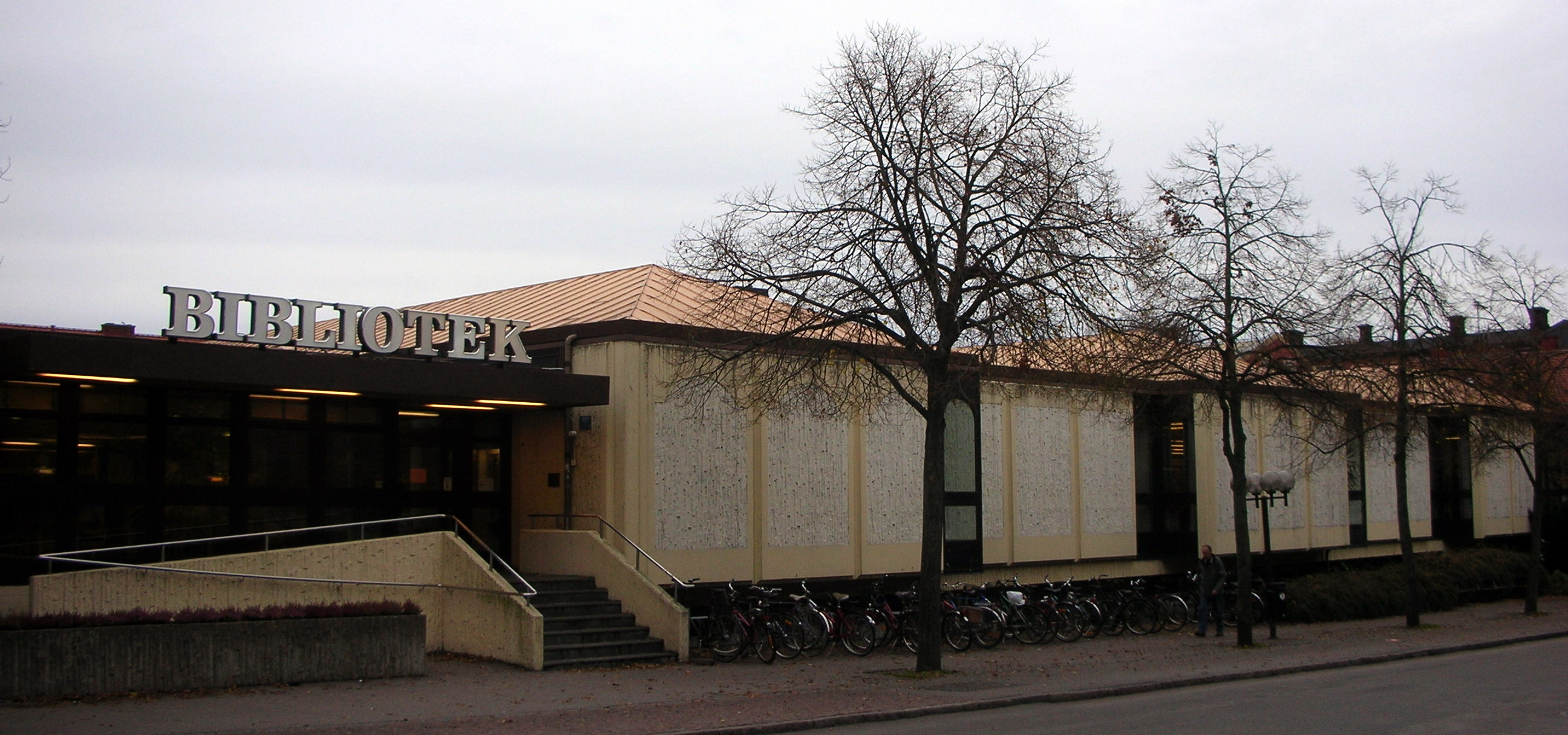
Varberg Public Library before the 2010–2012 expansion.

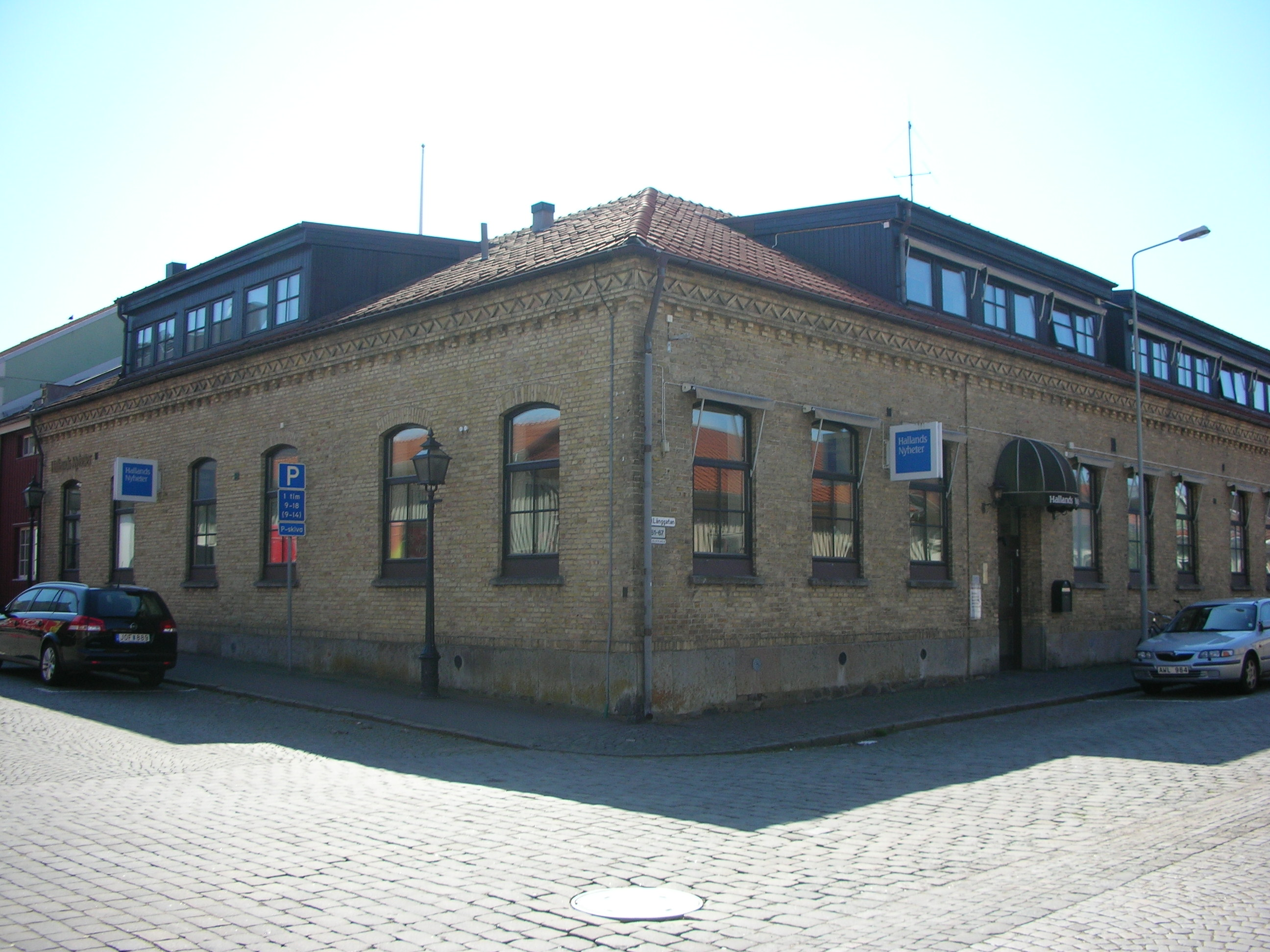
The public library housed in this former elementary school from 1912 to 1981.

The so-called Bagge Library was formed in 1834 and run by the district judge and magistrate Samuel Peter Bagge. The public was able to borrow books for a fee of six riksdaler banco for a year or four skilling for a day. Most of the library's book collection is preserved in the current public library. In 1871, the Association for distribution of general education took the initiative to a public lending library. They applied to the City Council to establish a library in the City Hall, but the proposal was rejected. In 1886, the Workers' Association received an annual grant of 150 kronor to maintain a reading room. In 1905, the library was overtaken by the city. It housed in the City Hall until 1912, when the City Treasury took over the premises.

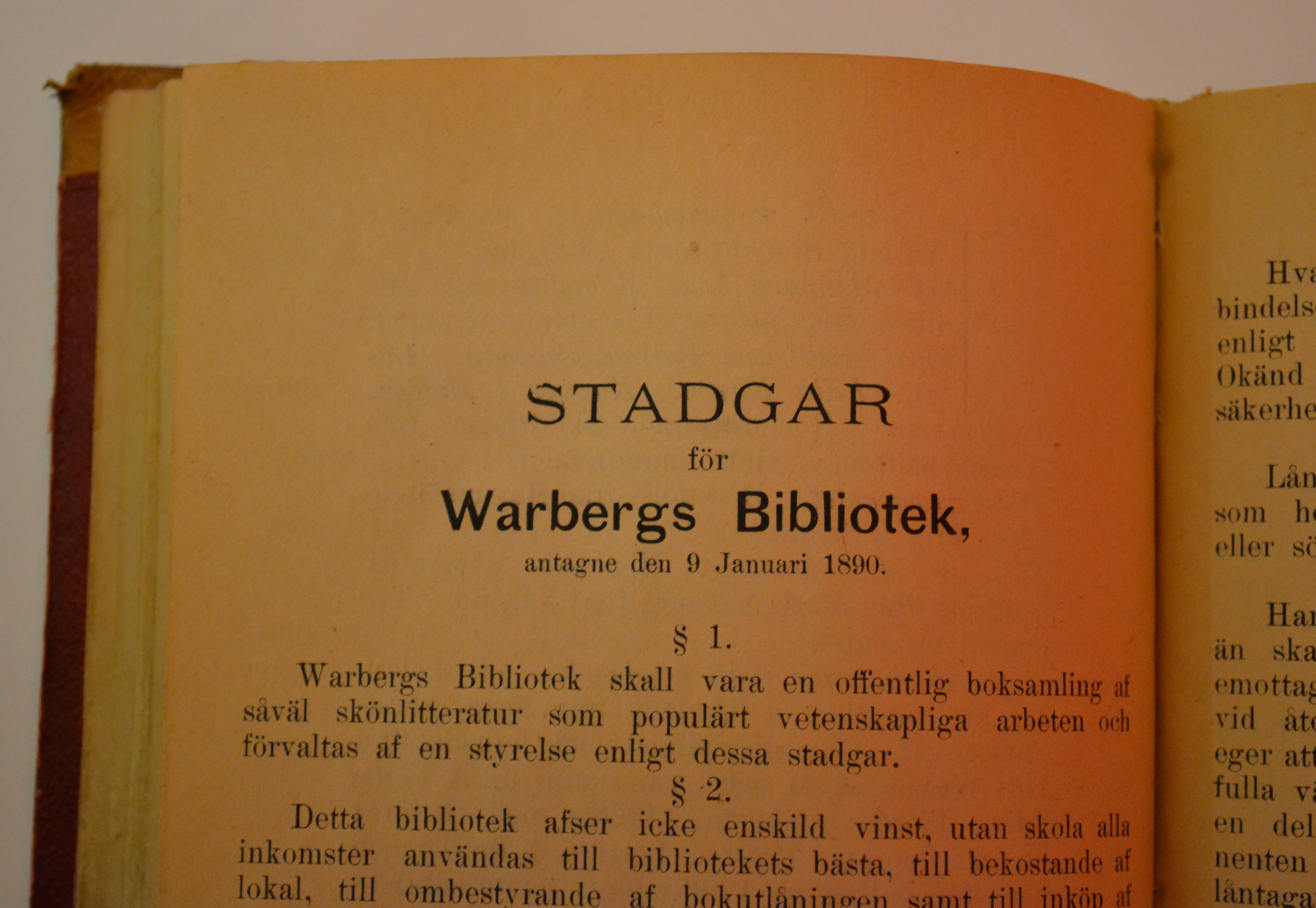
Statutes for Varberg Library, adopted on 9 January 1890.

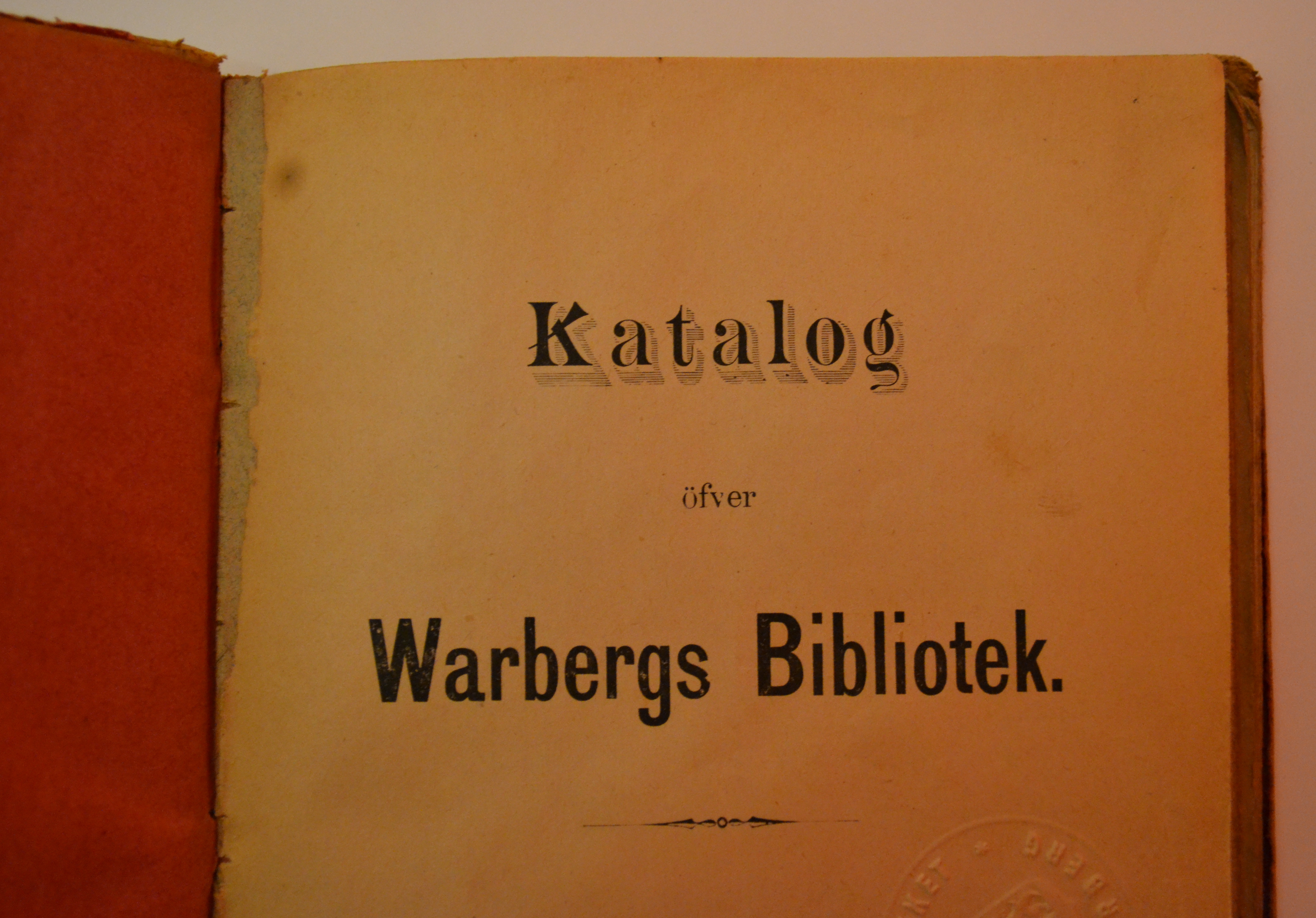
Catalogue for Varberg Library, 1890.

After that, the library housed in a former elementary school, built in the 1860s, until 1981. On 11 January 1981, the new public library was inaugurated by the Speaker of the Parliament Ingemund Bengtsson. Bengtsson was born in Veddige, close to Varberg. Before the 1981 library was built, the fire station of Varberg was located on the site from 1930 to 1979. After that, the fire station was moved to the industrial area Stormhall. The old library (the former elementary school) is today used by the local newspaper Hallands Nyheter as its Varberg editorial office.

In June 2007, a feasibility study on the library's future expansion was initiated. It was reported in August 2008. Twenty-four architectural offices sought to design the new arts center, out of which four were selected to make suggestions. In June 2009, the design proposed by Nyrén Architectural Office was chosen. The construction work began in September 2010. During the construction period, the public library housed in temporary premises in a former school in the adjacent block to the northeast. Komedianten was inaugurated on 14 January 2012 by the President of the Municipal Council, Margareta Lorentzen, and the Chairman of the Culture and Recreation Board, Christofer Bergenblock, with the participation of the percussion ensemble Komodo and the actress Maria Lundqvist, who portrayed her character the librarian Sally Santesson from the 1999 comic television series Sally.

== Branch libraries ==
Except for the main library in Varberg, there are public libraries in Bua, Kungsäter, Rolfstorp, Träslövsläge, Tvååker, and Veddige.

== See also ==
- List of libraries in Sweden
