= Himle =

Himle may refer to:

- Himle (locality), locality in Varberg Municipality, Sweden
- Himle Hundred, a hundred of Sweden

== People with the surname Himle ==
- Erick Clausen Himle (1930–1910), American politician and farmer
- Erik Himle (1924–2008), Norwegian civil servant and politician
- John Himle (born 1954), American politician and businessman
- Thorstein Himle (1857–1925), Norwegian-born American missionary

== See also ==
- Himley
