= Skärte =

Coordinates: 57°9′9″N 12°29′6″E

Skärte is a nature reserve in Varberg Municipality, Sweden. It has an area of 18.2 hectares. The reserve was established in 2006. The land is privately owned but managed by Halland County Council.

Skärte consists of two hills, covered with oak forest. Between the hills there is a ravine. In the ravine runs a stream, Stenån, which also passes through the nearby Gässlösa. In the ravine there are various vascular plants, such as Remote sedge, Marsh Hawksbeard, Ostrich fern, Wood Stitchwort, Whorled Solomon's-seal, and Kidneywort. The old oak trees in the reserve are covered with lichens.

Old maps show that Skärte was not covered with forest in the 17th century, but was probably pasture. However, there were large areas of contiguous woodland just a few miles away. In the 19th century, Skärte began to be covered with forest, and in the early 20th century the area was almost entirely wooded, with the exception of two small fields.
