= Balgö =

Nature reserve in Sweden

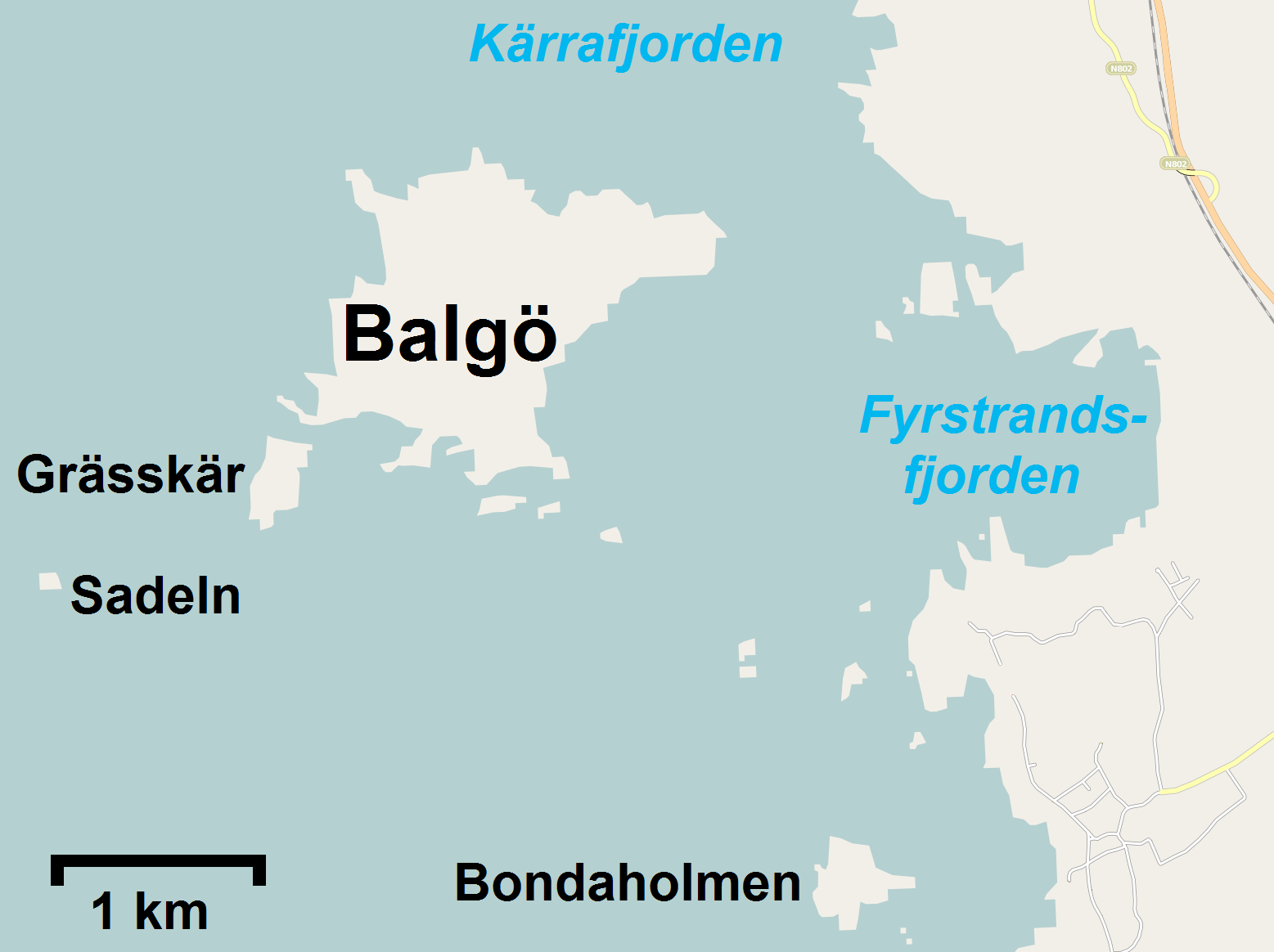

Geography
- Coordinates: 57°9′49.02″N 12°10′9.91″E

Administration
- Sweden
- Region: Halland
- County: Halland County
- Municipality: Varberg

Balgö is an island and a nature reserve in Kattegat, off Tångaberg in Varberg Municipality, Sweden. Balgö is the largest island in Halland. The nature reserve was established in 1950. Some smaller islands around Balgö are also included in the nature reserve.

Balgö is an important breeding and resting place for different birds, for example little tern, pied avocet and common eider. In the winters, there are white-tailed eagles in the area.

135 species of lichens have been found on Balgö.

Balgö has the largest population of natterjack toads in Halland.
