= Gässlösa =

Coordinates: 57°8′51.53″N 12°29′33.26″E

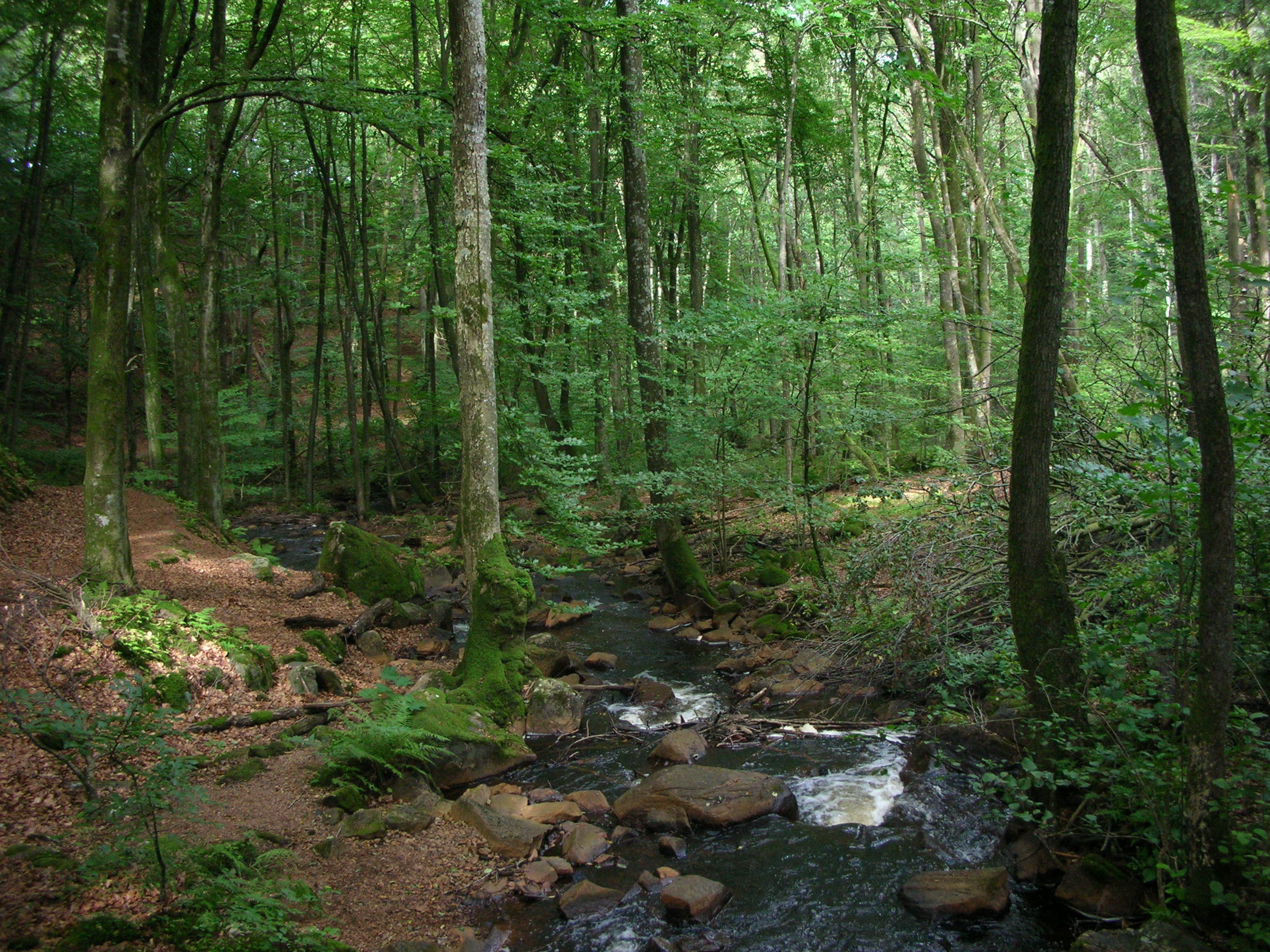
Gässlösa.

Gässlösa is a nature reserve in Varberg Municipality, Sweden. It's situated close to Rolfstorp. The reserve has an area of 34.5 hectares. It was established in 1977.

== Description ==
Gässlösa consists of beech forest. Inside the reserve, there is a hill called Böstesberget. On the hill, there is also oak. In clear weather, the Kattegat is visible from the top of the hill. A small stream, Stenån, runs through the reserve in a ravine.

In the spring, species such as European wood anemone, common wood sorrel and false lily of the valley are blooming. In the summer, when the canopy blocks out a lot of the sunlight, the ground is covered of less light-demanding species, such as various ferns. In addition, there are many different species of lichens in the nature reserve.

The wildlife in the nature reserve is rich. Elk and deer sometimes seek out to the stream to drink the water. There are also smaller mammals, such as badger, mink and stoat. Also hazel dormouse has been observed. The population of red fox has become smaller because of scabies.

Various species of birds live in the nature reserve, such as European pied flycatcher, Eurasian nuthatch, great tit, marsh tit, blue tit, green woodpecker, black woodpecker and great spotted woodpecker. In the river, there are brown trout. There are also insects like ground beetles and Geotrupes stercorarius.

== Mills ==
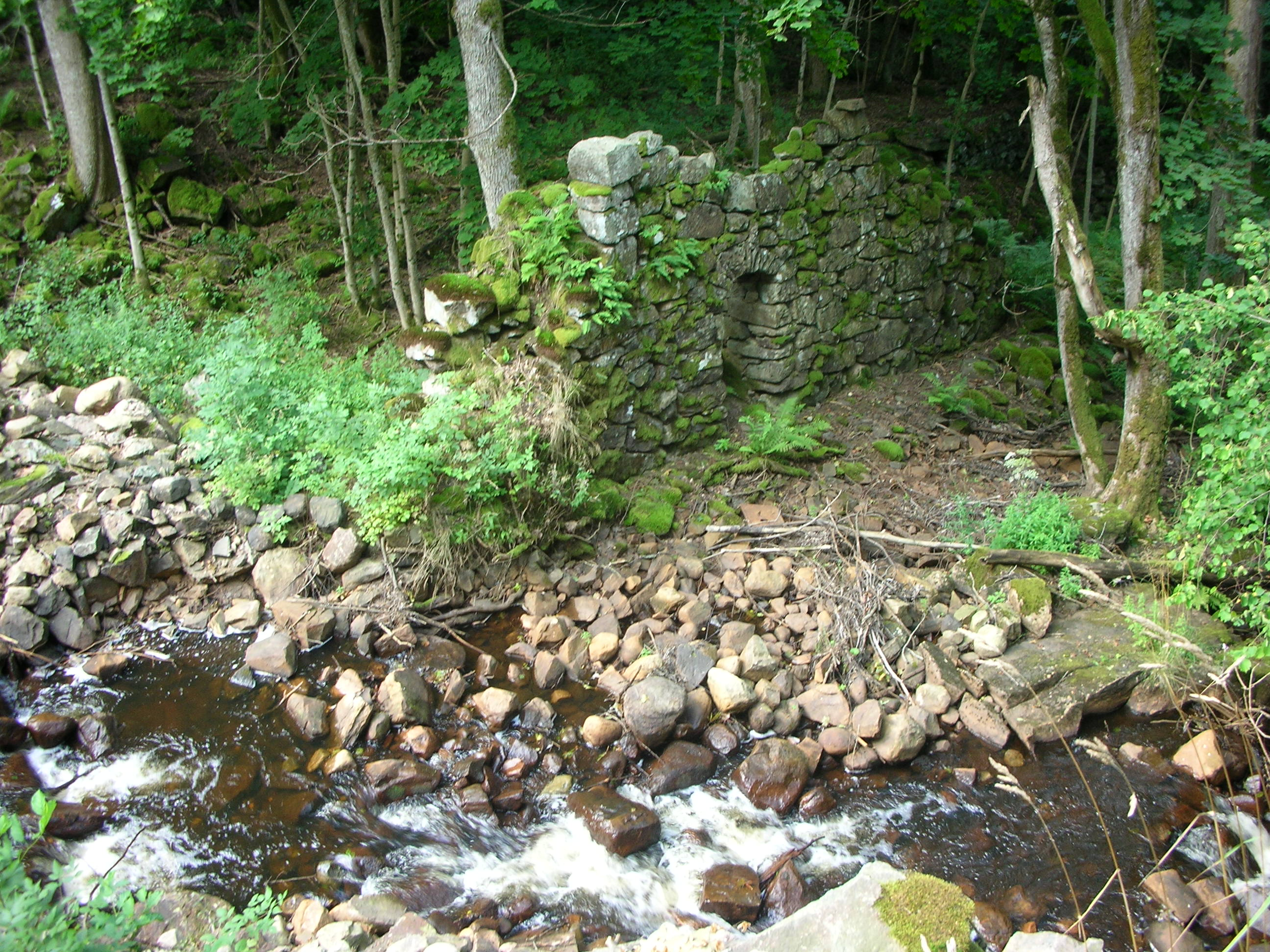
Ruins of the 1844 watermill.

Throughout history, several watermills have existed at the stream. In 1844, some smaller mills were replaced by one larger mill. There are still ruins of this mill in the nature reserve. It was used to extract linseed oil, but also to grind grain. After two years, the mill was taken out of service because of the low pressure on the water. It was replaced by a new watermill at Hovgård in the western part of the current nature reserve. By damming up the stream and lead the water through a canal and a wooden tube, a drop height of 31.9 meters, one of the highest in southern Sweden, was created. The mill was used until the 1990s.

Because of the dam at Hovgård, salmon and brown trout were prevented from reproducing in the stream. The dam was demolished in 2006 and the old riverbed was restored. In the fall it was clear that the salmon had reproduced again at the original areas, which was not possible for hundreds of years because of the dams.
