= Bua =

Bua or BUA may refer to:

== People with the surname ==
- Ajahn Maha Bua (1913–2011), Thai Buddhist monk
- Justin Bua (born 1968), American painter
- Kevin Bua (born 1993), Swiss footballer
- Peter Bua (fl. 1450), Albanian leader
- Tatiana Búa (born 1990), Argentine tennis player
- Theodore Bua, 15th century Albanian officer of the Republic of Venice

== Places ==
- Bua Province, Fiji
  - Bua (Fijian Communal Constituency, Fiji)
  - Bua District
- Bua, Varberg Municipality, Sweden
- Buinsky District (Bua Rayon) in the Republic of Tatarstan, Russia
- Buinsk, Republic of Tatarstan (Bua), a town

== Acronyms ==
- Built-up area
  - Built-up area (UK), as defined by the United Kingdom's Office for National Statistics
- Baptist University of the Américas, San Antonio, Texas, US
- Boston University Academy, Massachusetts, US
- British United Airways, a former British airline

== Codes ==
- Buryat language, ISO 639 code
- Buaran railway station, Indonesia, station code
- Buka Airport, Papua New Guinea, IATA airport code

== Other uses ==
- Bua language
