= Roehr Motorcycle Company =

Roehr Motorcycles LLC
- Company type: LLC
- Industry: Motorcycles
- Founded: 1995
- Founder: Walter Roehrich
- Fate: Closed
- Headquarters: Gurnee, Illinois, United States
- Products: Motorcycles

Roehr Motorcycle Company was a US motorcycle manufacturer based Gurnee, Illinois. It closed down in 2012.

== History ==
In 1995 Walter Roehrich began construction of the 500 cc two stroke v-twin motorcycle, using Yamaha YZ250 engine parts on a prototype crankcase. The result was the 115 hp Roehr Rv500 that was shown to the press in 2000. The company intended to manufacture the motorcycle in limited numbers but manufacturing the bike with the addition of the DFI fuel system, as well as meeting emission standards was prohibitively expensive.

The company turned its focus in creating a production bike. The Rv1000 prototype was powered by a 120 hp 936cc 60° 4-stroke V-twin manufactured by US Highland was revealed in 2004. The Highland engine was chosen because of its light weight. There was no interest from investors, so the Rv1000 was never manufactured.

== V-Roehr ==
V-Roehr
- Manufacturer: Roehr Motorcycle Company
- Production: 2008 -
- Class: Sport bike
- Engine: Supercharged, liquid cooled, DOHC, 8v 60deg V-twin; Bore x Stoke: 105 mm x 72mm
- Power: 180 hp (130 kW) @ 9000 rpm
- Torque: 113 lb⋅ft (153 N⋅m)
- Transmission: 6-speed, wet clutch
- Frame type: CrMo steel/aluminum beam
- Suspension: Front: Ohlins 43 mm USD, radial mount calipers Rear: Ohlins single shock with progressive linkage
- Brakes: Front: Brembo 2 x 320 mm radial mount 4 piston calipers Rear: Brembo 1 x 230 mm, 2 piston caliper
- Tires: Front: 120/70/17 Rear: 190/50/17
- Rake, trail: 23.5deg, 98 mm
- Wheelbase: 56 inches (140 cm)
- Seat height: 31.5 inches (80 cm)
- Weight: 425 pounds (193 kg) (dry)

Roehr introduced the V-Roehr production motorcycle in March 2007. The 1130 was to be powered by a 180 hp supercharged Harley Davidson 1250 cc "Revolution" engine. Production of the first 50 bikes was scheduled to begin in 2008. The cost was US$39,995. The fuel tank, with a capacity of 12 litres, was placed under the seat, with a "dummy" tank being a cover of the airbox and intake of the V-Rod engine. Side-mounted Honda radiators were used to create a slim profile. In late 2008 an updated version of the 1130 - the 1250 - using the 1,250cc version of the Revolution engine, fitted with a Rotrex supercharger. It was the most powerful production motorcycle available in the United States, at 180 horsepower (130 kW). As well as an increase in engine capacity, the price increased to $US49,999.

Demand for a high-price limited production motorcycle dropped during the Great Recession. Eleven of Roehr's twelve deposits for the 1250 were cancelled.

== eSupersport and eSuperbike ==
In 2009 Roehr produced a pair of electric sport bikes, based on a Hyosung GT250 chassis. Roehr wanted to build his own chassis, but adapting the Hyosung saved him $US15,000. The eSupersport had a single motor developing the equivalent of 48 hp, while the eSuperbike had two motors developing the equivalent of 96 hp. The battery in the eSuperbike consists of 240 individual cells; the eSupersport pack is made of 180 cells. Range was between 70 and 100 miles. The eSupersport sold for US$16,965 and the eSuperbike for US$27,595. There were no sales, and Roehr stopped production of all motorcycles in 2012.
