= Eucharist (band) =

Swedish melodic death metal band

- Origin: Veddige, Sweden
- Genres: Melodic death metal, melodic black metal (later)
- Years active: 1989–1998, 2016–present
- Label: WAR Music
- Members: Markus Johnsson; Simon Schilling
- Past members: Henrik Meijner; Martin Karlsson; Thomas Einarsson; Daniel Erlandsson; Tobias Gustafsson; Matti Almsenius

Eucharist is a Swedish melodic death metal band from Veddige, formed in 1989. They released two albums in the 1990s before disbanding. After reuniting, the group released their third album in 2022.

== History ==
Eucharist's first album, A Velvet Creation (1993), featured Markus Johnsson (vocals, guitar), Thomas Einarsson (guitar), Tobias Gustafsson (bass), and Daniel Erlandsson (drums). For the second, Mirrorworlds (1997), they were reduced to the trio of Johnsson, Erlandsson, and bass guitarist Martin Karlsson. One of numerous groups that established the melodic style known as the Gothenburg Sound, Eucharist did not fare well in the face of stiff competition, resulting in personnel joining rival bands. Original bass guitarist Gustaffsson joined power metal band Armageddon, and drummer Erlandsson worked for a time with In Flames before settling in with Arch Enemy.

Eucharist was founded in Veddige, a small city about 40 km from Gothenburg, some time around 1989. A demo released in 1992 became a classic in the metal underground. It was titled Greeting Immortality. The same year, Obscure Plasma Records released the Greeting Immortality 7" (without the consent of the band), and in 1993, the band recorded the song "The View" for a Deaf Records (Peaceville Records) compilation album called Deaf Metal Sampler. Afterwards, the band split up.

Wrong Again Records asked them to reunite and sign a deal, which they did. Eucharist recorded their first album, A Velvet Creation, released in 1993, with the cover misprinted in the wrong color. In the summer of 1994, the songs "Wounded and Alone" and "The Predictable End" were recorded for a compilation album released by Wrong Again Records entitled, W.A.R. Compilation Vol 1., released in 1995.

Eucharist split up again. Some members started playing in other bands. Erlandsson played drums on two tracks of In Flames' EP Subterranean. In 1996, Johnsson and Erlandsson started working with Eucharist again, and WAR Music (a new label risen from the ashes of Wrong Again Records) offered them a deal. The album, Mirrorworlds, released in 1997, was the result. After a short tour in early 1998, Eucharist split up.

In 2001, A Velvet Creation was remastered and re-released on Regain Records on both CD and vinyl, with the two songs from the W.A.R. Compilation session as bonus tracks. The cover was printed in the correct color, but this time Markus Johnsson's name was misprinted as Marcus Johansson. In 2011, Mirrorworlds was released for the first time on vinyl by Wolfsbane records, including a limited-edition version with a bonus 7-inch featuring 'The View' from 1993's Deaf Metal Sampler released by Deaf Records a sublabel of Peaceville.

As of April 2016, the band reunited with the original lineup playing the first show in 18 years at Metal Reunion PTD3 festival at Sweden.

In 2022, the band's third album, I Am the Void, was released. This album shows a more melodic black metal sound, without sacrificing the band's death metal roots.

== Discography ==
=== Studio albums ===
- A Velvet Creation − 1993
- Mirrorworlds − 1997
- I Am the Void – 2022

=== EPs and demos ===
- Rehearsal − 1991 (demo)
- Greeting Immortality − 1992 (EP)
- Demo '92 − 1992 (demo)
- A Velvet Creation − 1993 (demo)
