= Skärbäck =

Nature reserve in Sweden

Coordinates: 57°5′16.3″N 12°31′19.86″E

Skärbäck is a nature reserve in Varberg Municipality, Sweden. It's situated between the lakes Skärsjön, Humsjön and Grytsjön. The reserve has an area of 98 hectares and is dominated by broad-leaved deciduous forest. It was established in 1978.

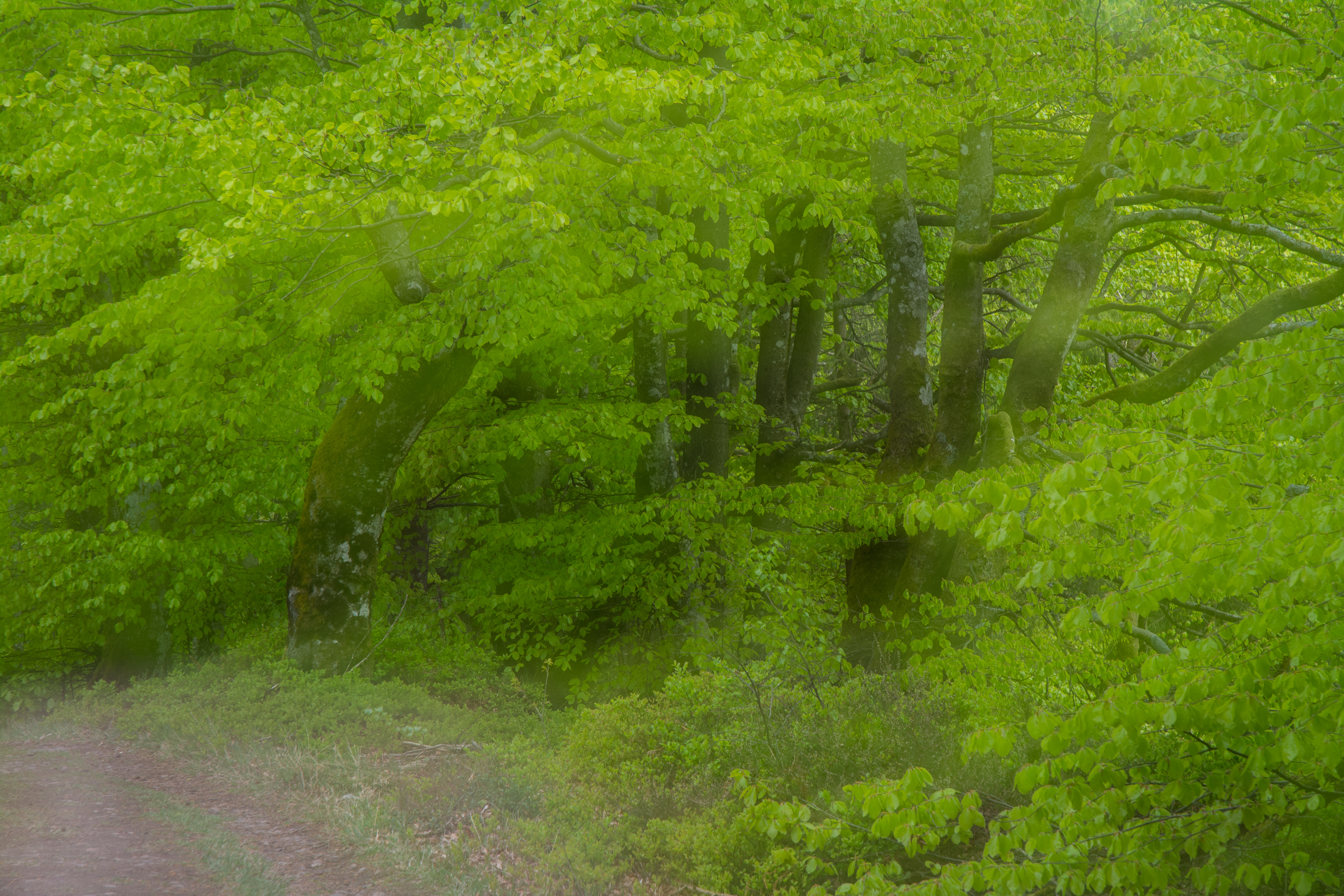

The area has been dominated by beech forest for at least 1,000 years. In the 19th century, much of the forests in Halland were felled, but not at Skärbäck. One reason may have been that the area was owned by the nobility until 1892. Felling of forest on the land of the nobility was surrounded by restrictions.

In the forests of Skärbäck, there are many rare species, for example different lichens. There are also birds like stock pigeon and hawfinch.
