= Ines Uusmann =

Swedish politician (born 1948)

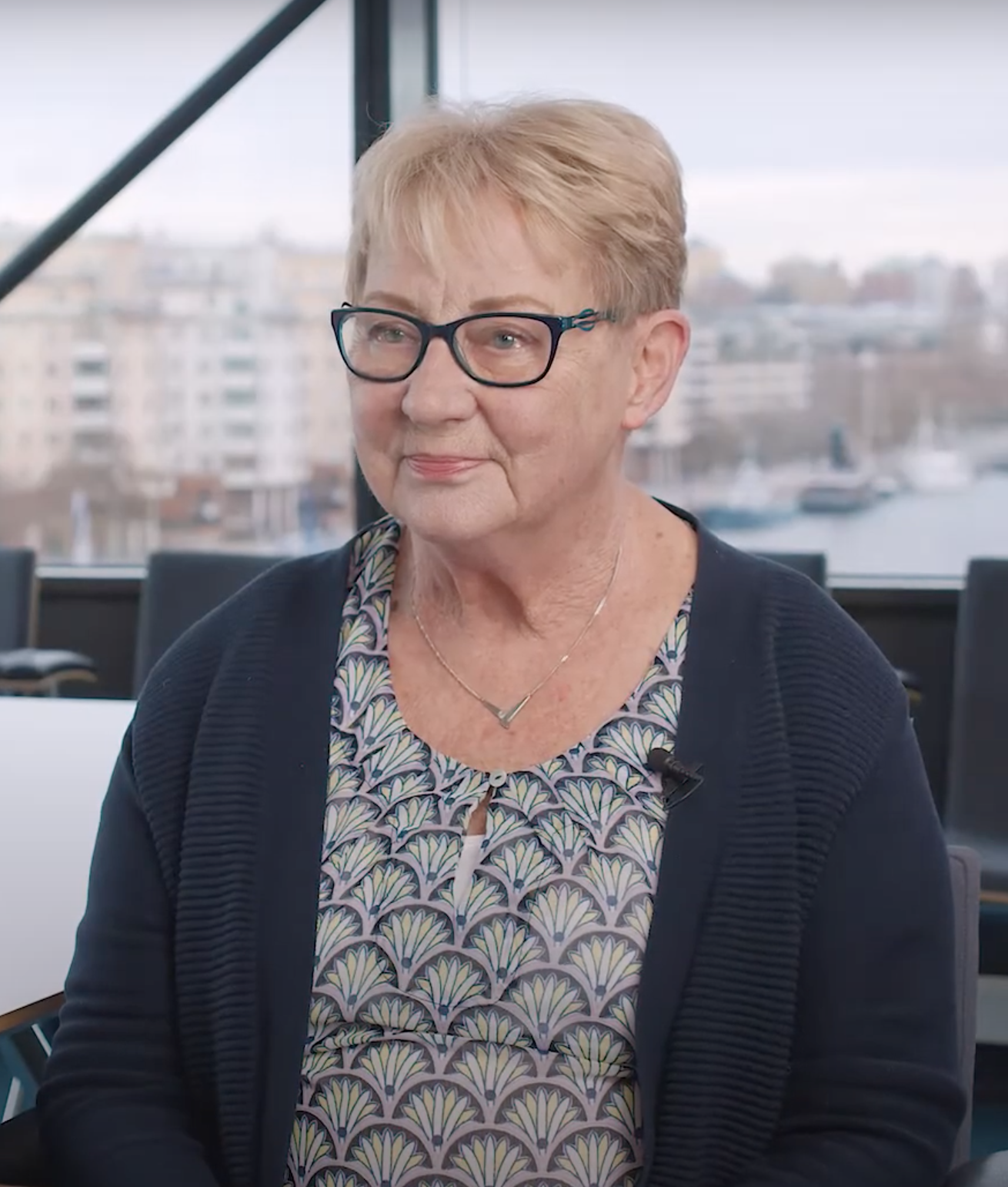

Personal details
- Born: 30 October 1948 (age 76); Varberg, Sweden

Ines Junéa Uusmann (née Johansson; born 30 October 1948) is a Swedish politician.

Born in Rolfstorp, Halland, she started her career as a trade union activist and became an MP in 1990. She became Minister of Communications (Transport) in 1994, a post she would hold until 1998, when she left parliament.

From 1999 until 2008, she served as director-general for The National Board of Housing, Building and Planning (Boverket).

Ines Uusmann is the daughter of Thure G. Johansson, discoverer of the Bocksten Man.

Preceded by Mats Odell	Minister of Communications (Transport); 1994—1998	Succeeded by Björn Rosengren
