= List of libraries in Sweden =

This is a list of libraries in Sweden.

== Libraries by county ==
=== Blekinge ===
- Karlskrona stadsbibliotek

=== Dalarna ===
- Falun city library

=== Gävleborg ===
- Gävle City Library

=== Gotland ===
- Visby stadsbibliotek

=== Halland ===
- Komedianten, Varberg

=== Jämtland ===
- Östersund library

=== Jönköping ===
- Jönköping public library

=== Kalmar ===
- Kalmar stadsbibliotek

=== Kronoberg ===
- Linnaeus University University Library
- Ljungby library

=== Norrbotten ===
- Luleå stadsbibliotek

=== Örebro ===
- Örebro County Regional Library (Swedish: Biblioteksutveckling Region Örebro län)
- Örebro University Library

=== Östergötland ===
- Linköping University Library

=== Scania (Skåne) ===
- Landskrona City Library
- Lund University Libraries
- Malmö City Library
- Malmö University Library

=== Södermanland ===
See also: Libraries in Södermanland County (in Swedish)

- Nyköping City Library

=== Stockholm ===
- Karolinska Institutet University Library, Stockholm
- Royal Institute of Technology Library
- Library of the Royal Swedish Academy of Letters, History and Antiquities
- Library of the Swedish Parliament
- National Library of Sweden
- Nobel Library of the Swedish Academy
- Södertörn University Library, Huddinge
- Stockholm Public Library
- Stockholm University Library

=== Uppsala ===
- Swedish University of Agricultural Sciences Library
- Uppsala University Library
  - Carolina Rediviva

=== Värmland ===
- Karlstad University Library

=== Västerbotten ===
- Umeå Public Library
- Umeå University Library

=== Västernorrland ===
- Mid Sweden University Library
- Regionbibliotek Västernorrland

=== Västmanland ===
See also: Libraries in Västmanland County (in Swedish)

- Mälardalen University Library, Västerås

=== Västra Götaland ===
See also: Libraries in Gothenburg (in Swedish)

- Chalmers University of Technology Library
- Gothenburg University Library
  - KvinnSam - National Resource Library for Gender Studies
- University of Borås Library
- University West Library, Trollhättan

== See also ==
- LIBRIS catalog, Sweden
- Copyright law of Sweden
- Legal deposit in Sweden
- Mass media in Sweden
- Open access in Sweden
- Swedish literature

in Swedish

- Libraries in Sweden (in Swedish)
- List of Sweden's research libraries in order of size (in Swedish)
- Regional library activities in Sweden (in Swedish)
- Swedish Library Association (in Swedish)
- Archives in Sweden (in Swedish)
