= Tofta, Varberg Municipality =

Tofta
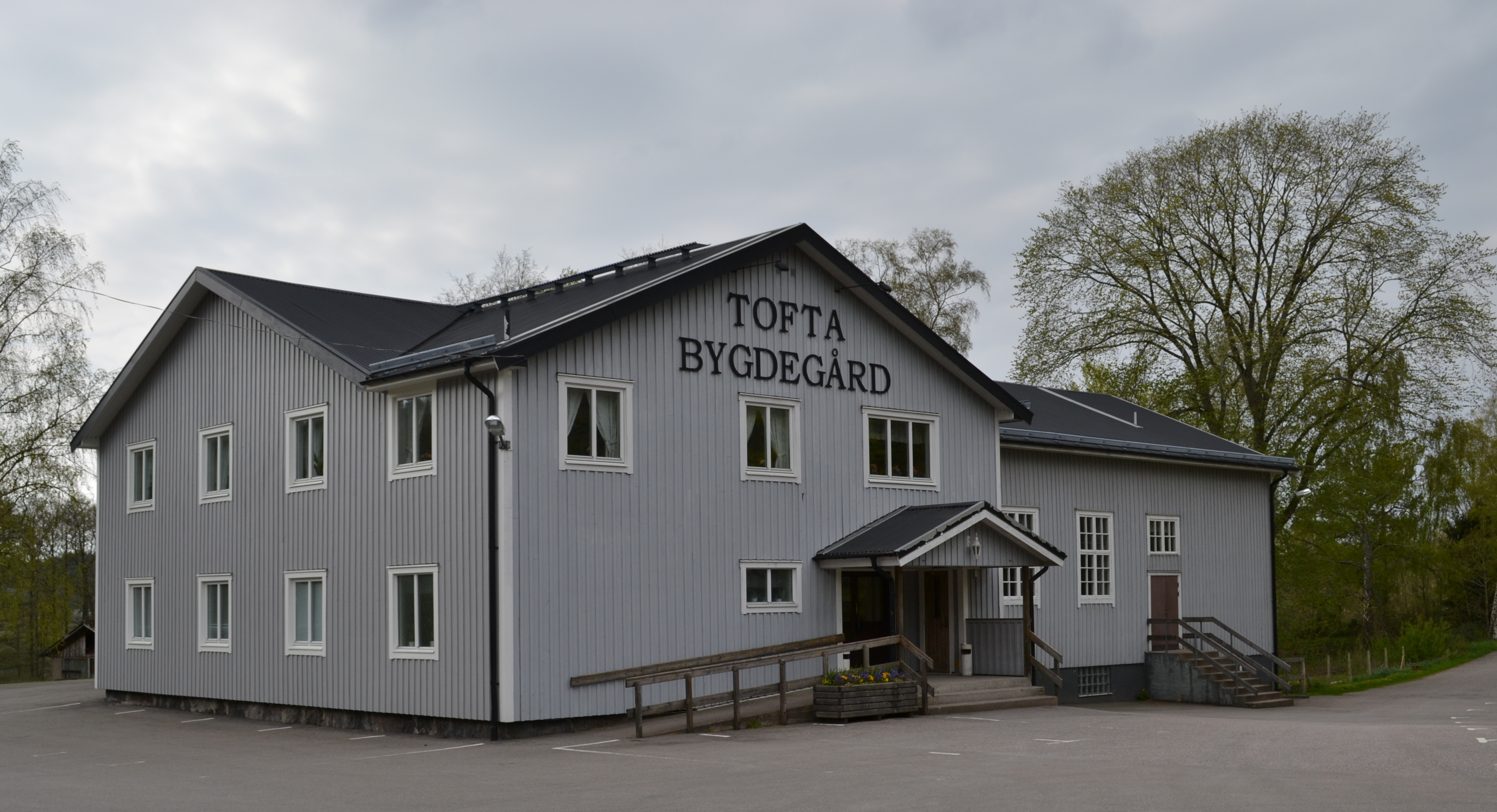
- Tofta Community Center, 2012

- Location within Halland Location within Sweden
- Coordinates: 57°10′N 12°18′E
- Country: Sweden
- Province: Halland
- County: Halland County
- Municipality: Varberg Municipality

Area
  - Total: 0.56 km^{2} (0.22 sq mi)

Population (31 December 2010)
  - Total: 386
  - Density: 694/km^{2} (1,800/sq mi)
- Time zone: UTC+1 (CET)
  - Summer (DST): UTC+2 (CEST)

Tofta is a locality situated in Varberg Municipality, Halland County, Sweden with 386 inhabitants in 2010.
