= Trönninge, Varberg Municipality =

Trönninge
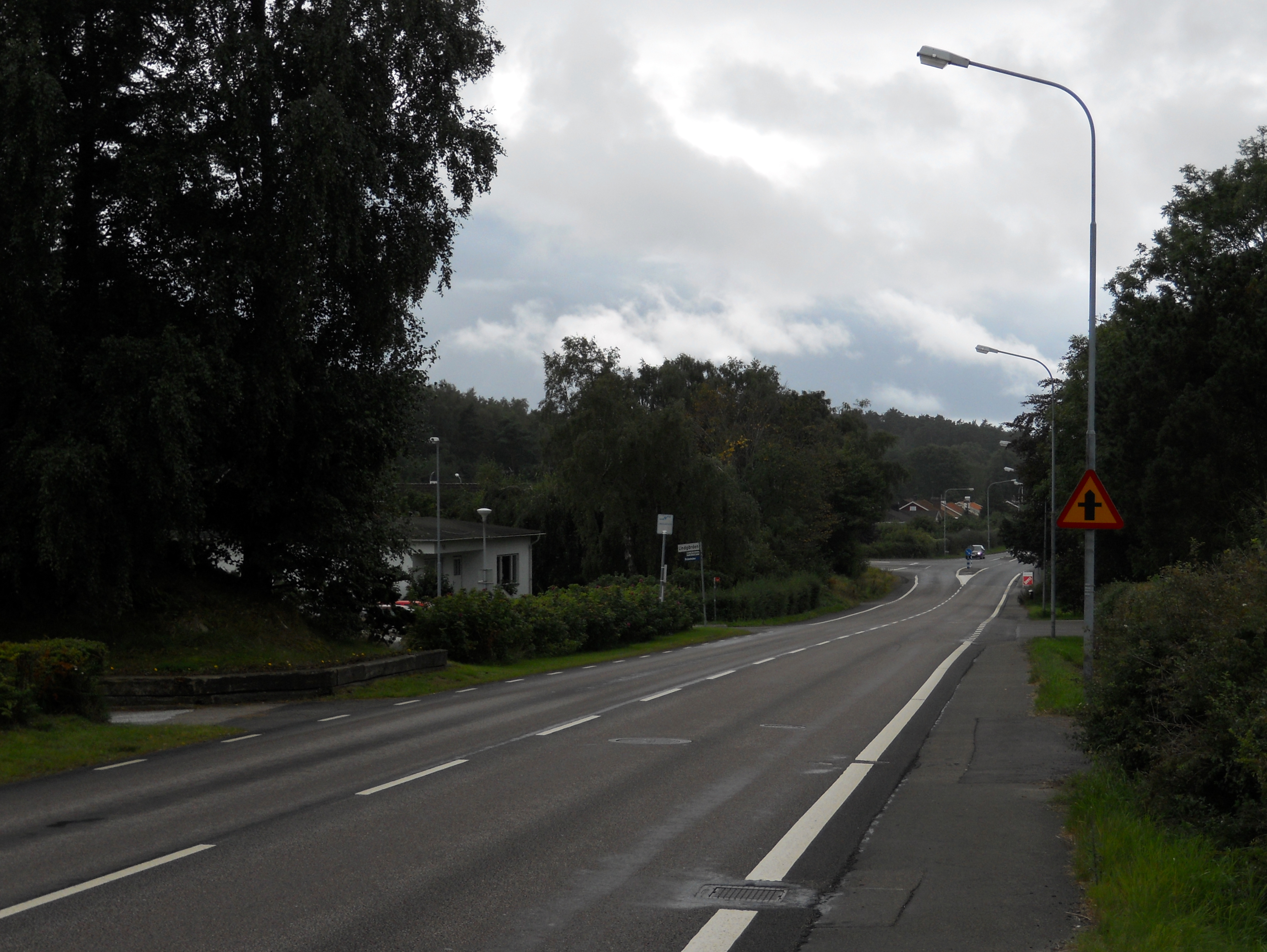
- Trönninge.

- Location within Halland Location within Sweden
- Coordinates: 57°08′N 12°17′E
- Country: Sweden
- Province: Halland
- County: Halland County
- Municipality: Varberg Municipality

Area
  - Total: 0.58 km^{2} (0.22 sq mi)

Population (31 December 2010)
  - Total: 880
  - Density: 1,528/km^{2} (3,960/sq mi)
- Time zone: UTC+1 (CET)
  - Summer (DST): UTC+2 (CEST)

Trönninge is a locality situated in Varberg Municipality, Halland County, Sweden, with 880 inhabitants in 2010.

== Sports ==
The following sports clubs are located in Trönninge, Varberg Municipality:

- Trönninge BK
