= US Highland =

- Company type: Public
- Traded as: OTC Pink: UHLN
- Industry: Manufacturing
- Founder: Mats Malmberg
- Headquarters: Tulsa, Oklahoma, USA
- Area served: United States
- Key people: Bengt Andersson, Chairman
- Products: Off-road motorcycles
- Website: ushighland.com

US Highland was an American motorcycle manufacturer based in Tulsa, Oklahoma.

US Highland was formed in 2010 by Mats Malmberg, founder of the Swedish company Highland Motorcycles AB, together with Oklahoma financier and former motocross racer Chase Bales, after negotiations to sell Highland to the American manufacturer ATK Motorcycles fell through. Malmberg had established Highland Motorcycles AB in Skällinge, Sweden, in 1997, producing a 950cc V-twin super-enduro before start-up difficulties put the venture on hold.

The reorganized US company, chaired by former Husqvarna CEO Bengt Andersson, opened a 33,000-square-foot (3,100 m^{2}) factory in Tulsa on June 1, 2010, and announced plans to produce off-road motorcycles built to customer specifications using modular construction based on a single-cylinder engine and a 60-degree V-twin. The company stated it planned to build out a dealer network in the United States in 2011–2012.

Highland also announced that they would also produce an electric motorcycle utilizing a wheel hub motor.

On July 10, 2010, Malmberg and two other executives of US Highland were killed when their small plane, returning from a business trip in Michigan, crashed in Tulsa's Mohawk Park after they radioed that they were low on fuel and requested an unscheduled landing at nearby Tulsa International Airport.

In 2018, US Highland repositioned itself as a food-service business development company focused on acquiring established restaurant chains and franchises. Effective October 1, 2018, following FINRA approval, the company changed its name to Cruzani, Inc. and its ticker symbol from UHLN to CZNI.
