= Åsby =

- Location within Halland Location within Sweden
- Coordinates: 57°14′N 12°18′E
- Country: Sweden
- Province: Halland
- County: Halland County
- Municipality: Varberg Municipality

Area
  - Total: 0.64 km^{2} (0.25 sq mi)

Population (31 December 2010)
  - Total: 423
  - Density: 658/km^{2} (1,700/sq mi)
- Time zone: UTC+1 (CET)
  - Summer (DST): UTC+2 (CEST)

Åsby is a locality situated in Varberg Municipality, Halland County, Sweden with 423 inhabitants in 2010.
