= Malmö City Library =

Library in Malmö, Sweden

- Malmö stadsbibliotek
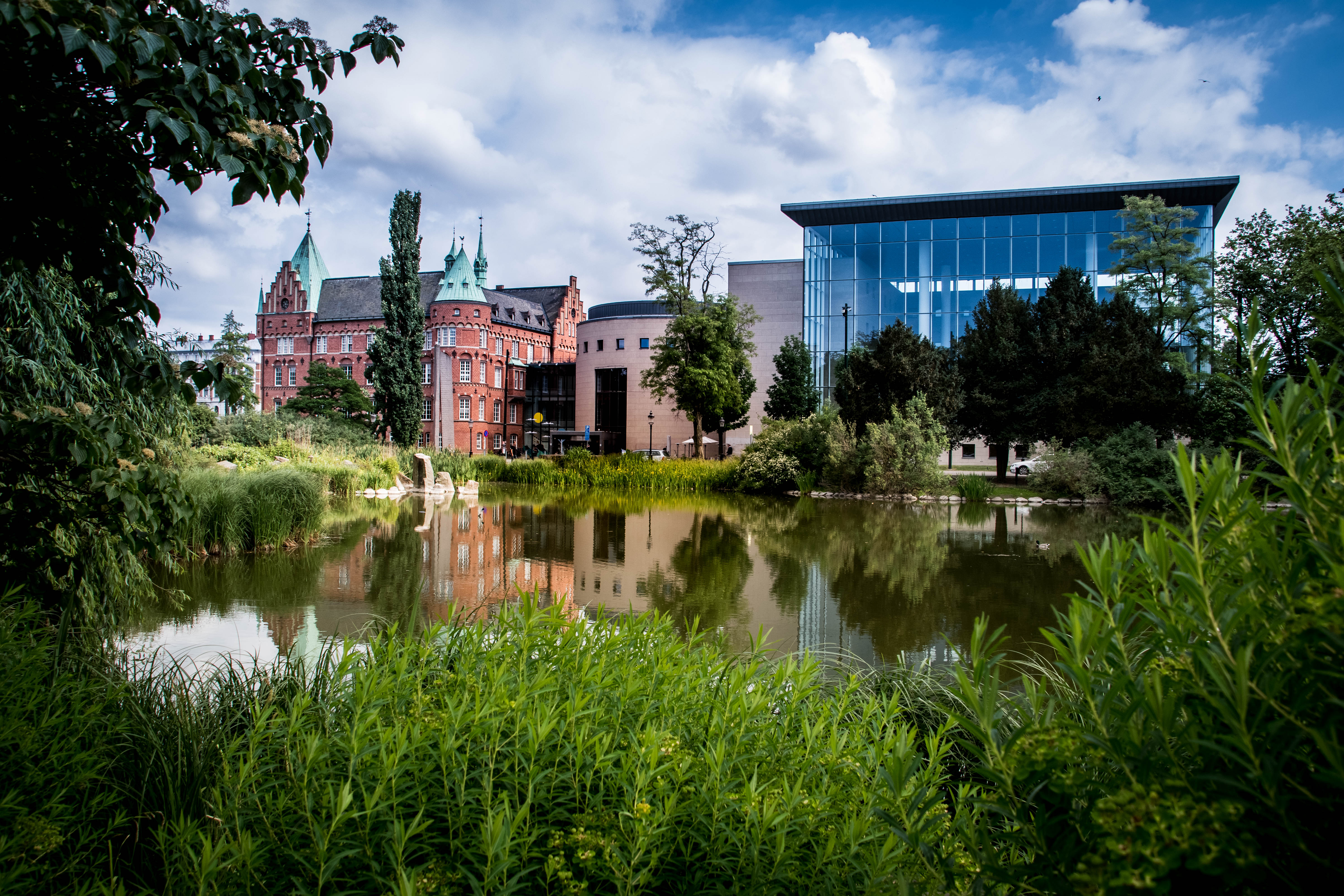
- 55.6005°N 12.9941°E
- Location: Malmö, Skåne County, Sweden
- Type: Public library
- Established: 12 December 1905; 120 years ago
- Architects: John Smedberg, Fredrik Sundbärg, Henning Larsen

Access and use
- Circulation: 1.5 million
- Population served: 1.5 million

Malmö City Library (Swedish: Malmö stadsbibliotek) is a municipal public library in Malmö, Sweden, which opened on 12 December 1905. It has 550,000 different media, about 10,000 DVDs and 33,500 music CDs. In 2006, it became the first library in Sweden to lend video games.

== History ==
Malmö City Library first opened on 12 December 1905, then in Hotel Tunneln. At that time they had 3,096 volumes – books and periodicals. In 1946, it moved to "The Castle" at Regementsgatan. The Castle, as it had come to be known, was originally built for Malmö Museum, and was designed by the architects John Smedberg and Fredrik Sundbärg who had been inspired by Danish and Southern Swedish renaissance castles.

Malmö City Library, as it is today, consists of three buildings. "The Calendar of light" was designed by the Danish architect Henning Larsen and was inaugurated 31 May 1997. The Castle was restored and re-inaugurated 24 September 1999. These two main buildings are linked by a building called "The Cylinder", where the entrance, an information desk, a return desk and a cafe are located.

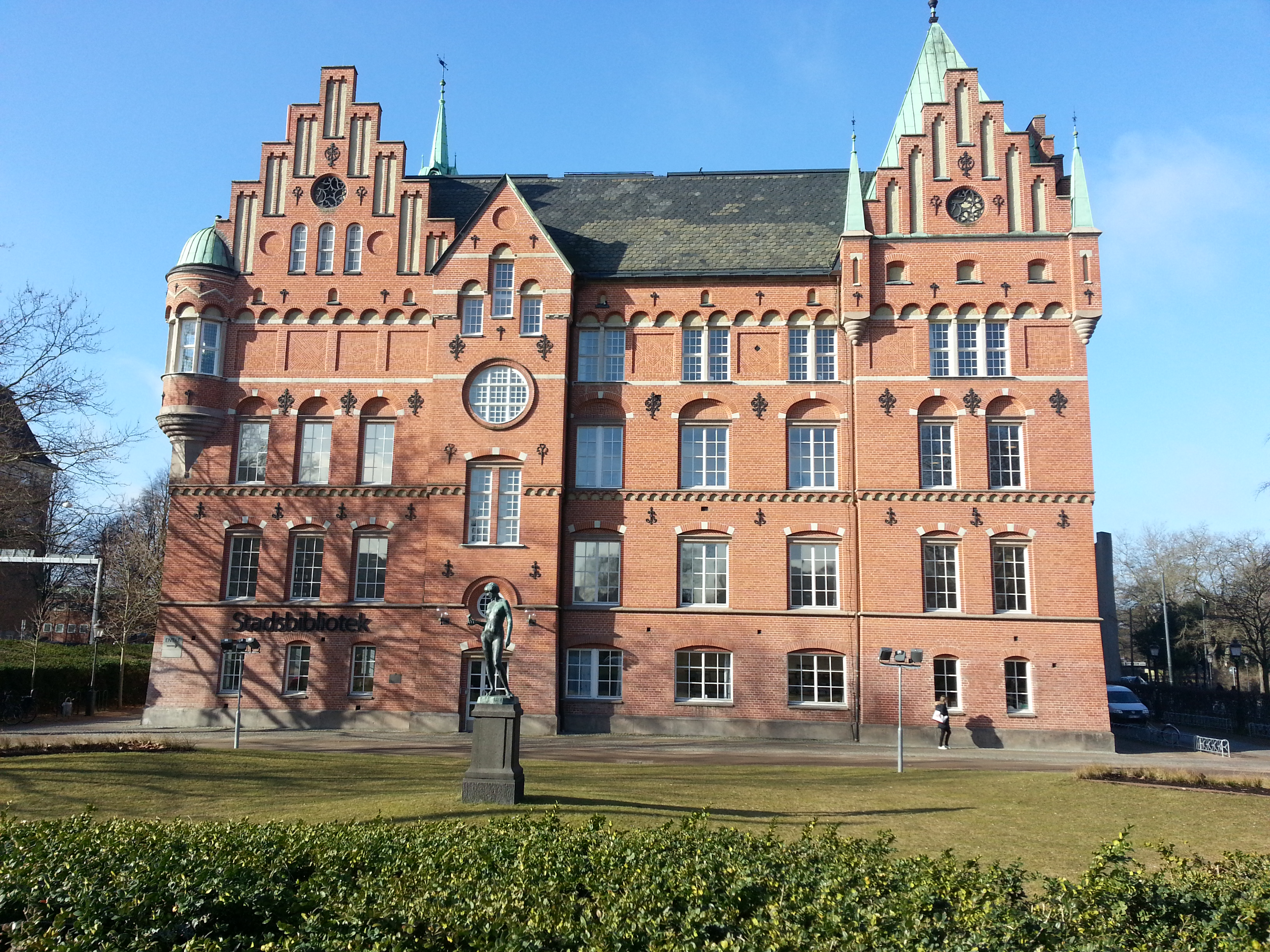
The old building

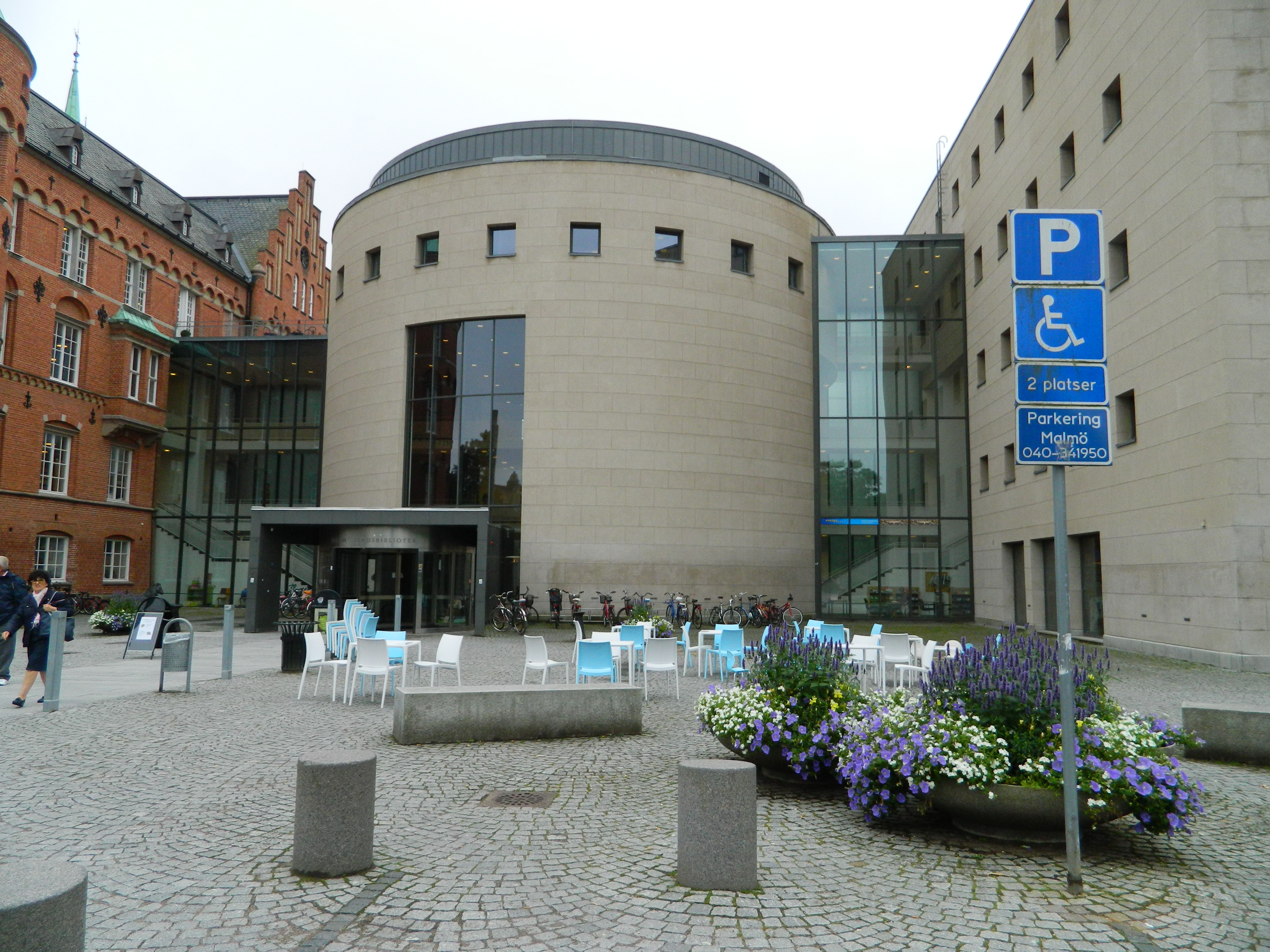
"The Cylinder" linking the old and new buildings

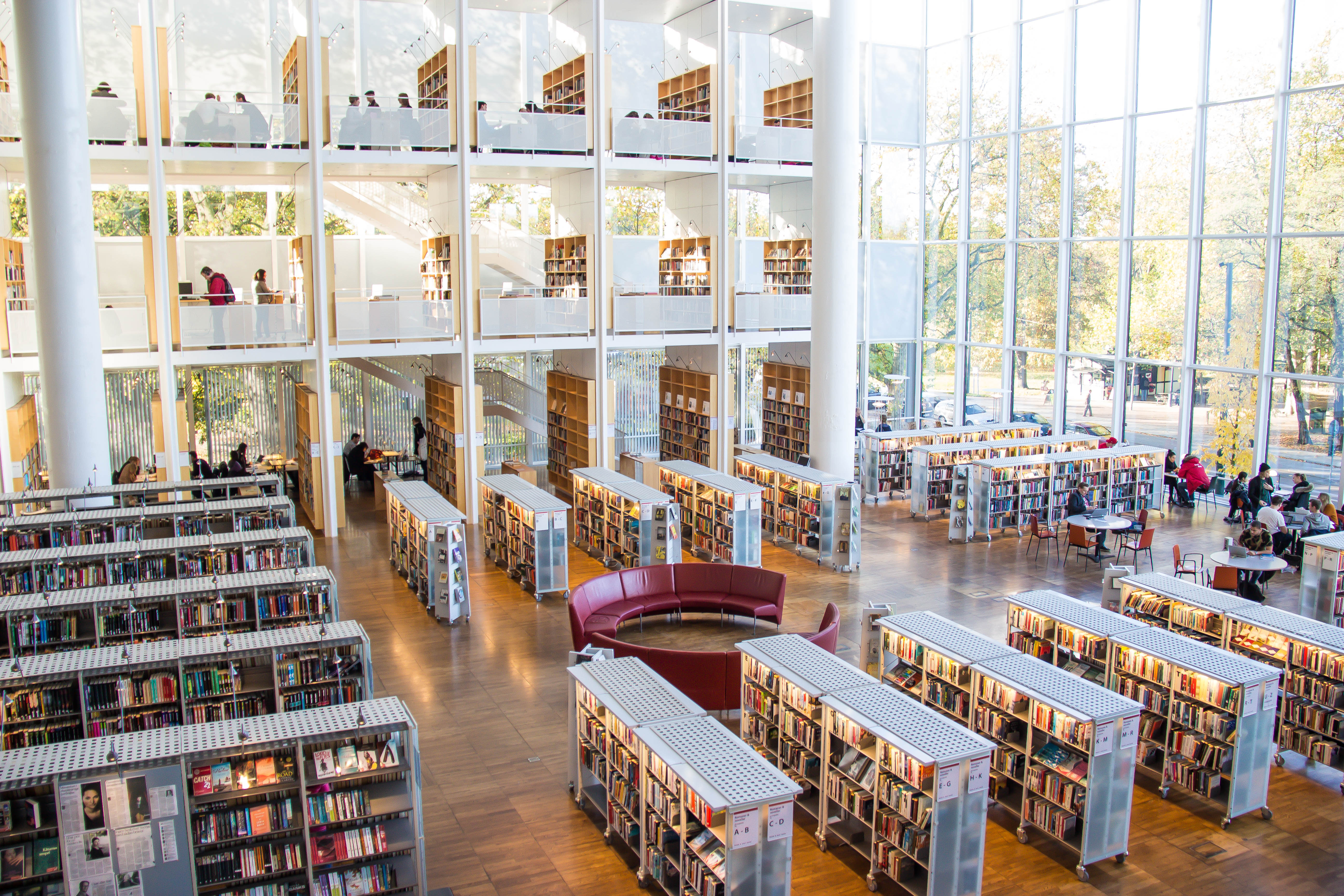
Interior

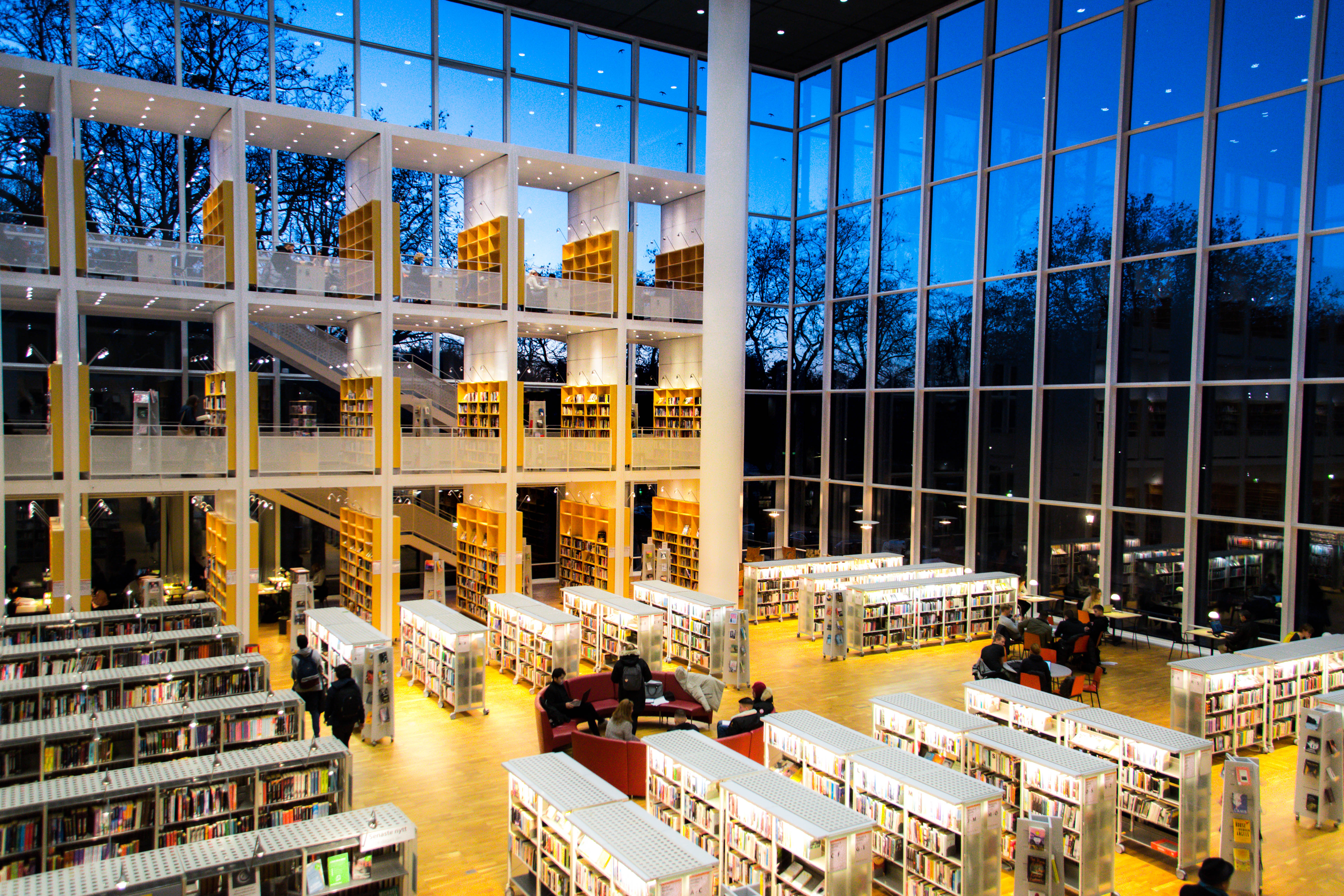
Interior at night

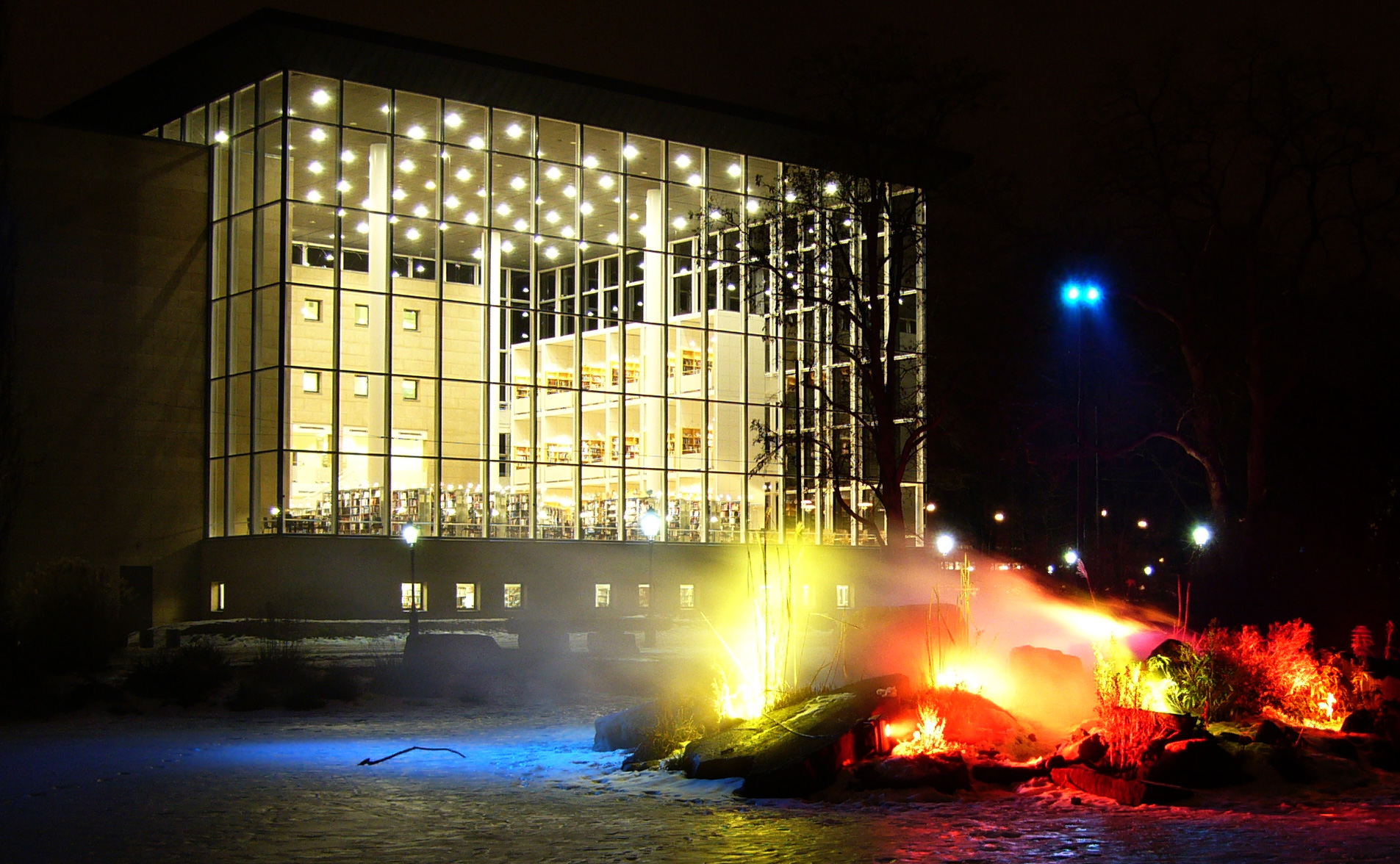
The Calendar of Light in winter

== See also ==
- List of libraries in Sweden
