= Södra Näs =

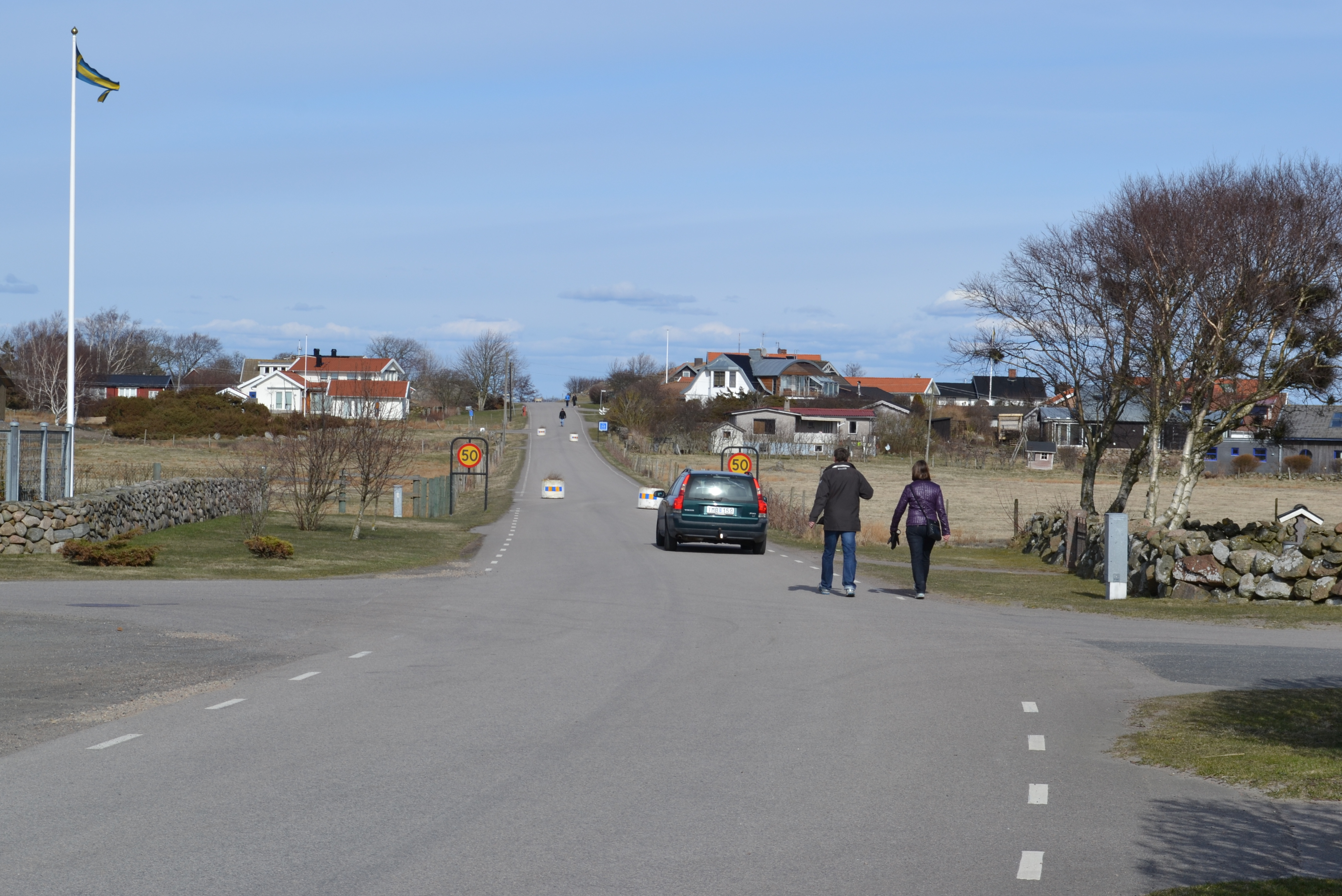

- Location within Halland Location within Sweden
- Coordinates: 57°05′N 12°17′E
- Country: Sweden
- Province: Halland
- County: Halland County
- Municipality: Varberg Municipality

Area
  - Total: 0.60 km^{2} (0.23 sq mi)

Population (31 December 2010)
  - Total: 671
  - Density: 1,113/km^{2} (2,880/sq mi)
- Time zone: UTC+1 (CET)
  - Summer (DST): UTC+2 (CEST)

Södra Näs is a locality situated in Varberg Municipality, Halland County, Sweden, with 671 inhabitants in 2010.
