= Löftaskog =

- Location within Halland Location within Sweden
- Coordinates: 57°18′N 12°11′E
- Country: Sweden
- Province: Halland
- County: Halland County
- Municipality: Varberg Municipality

Area
  - Total: 0.82 km^{2} (0.32 sq mi)

Population (31 December 2010)
  - Total: 327
  - Density: 401/km^{2} (1,040/sq mi)
- Time zone: UTC+1 (CET)
  - Summer (DST): UTC+2 (CEST)

Löftaskog is a locality situated in Varberg Municipality, Halland County, Sweden with 327 inhabitants in 2010.
