= Träslövsläge =

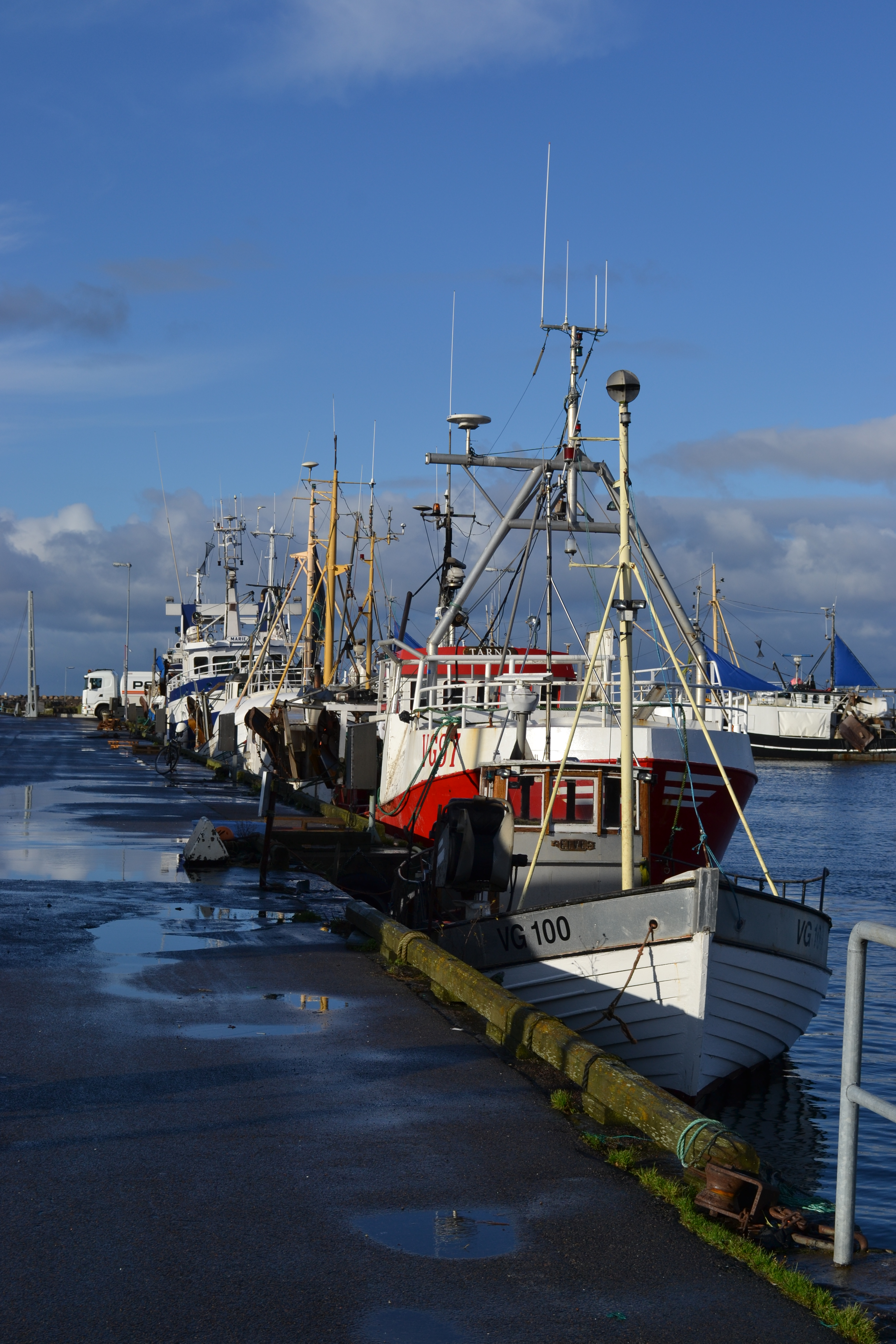
- Träslövsläge Harbour.

- Location within Halland Location within Sweden
- Coordinates: 57°03′N 12°16′E
- Country: Sweden
- Province: Halland
- County: Halland County
- Municipality: Varberg Municipality

Area
  - Total: 1.60 km^{2} (0.62 sq mi)

Population (31 December 2010)
  - Total: 2,600
  - Density: 1,630/km^{2} (4,200/sq mi)
- Time zone: UTC+1 (CET)
  - Summer (DST): UTC+2 (CEST)

Träslövsläge is a locality situated in Varberg Municipality, Halland County, Sweden, with 2,600 inhabitants in 2010.

Träslövsläge has a fishing harbour. Due to harbour expansion during the 20th century, this harbour has become the largest fishing harbour in Halland County.

A part of the early settlements still exists along the narrow Storgatan. Träslövsläge has grown southwards and eastwards.

Next to the fishing harbour lies a well-equipped marina. The marina has a petrol station and a restaurant. Träslövsläge has excellent conditions for windsurfing, especially when the winds come from the southwest. The name Träslövsläge means Träslöv's harbour.

The dialect Läjesboa is still spoken by a few people in Träslövsläge. In Denmark it is regarded as a Danish dialect. Läjesboa is a remainder from the time before Swedish culture began to influence Halland County. Halland came under Swedish rule during the end of the 17th century.

== History ==
The first time this fishing village was mentioned was in 1558–1559. Back then it had the name Tøllen. Two fishing teams consisting of seven men in total fished from Tøllen. A land reform was held in 1833. Its purpose was to give every farmer coherent pieces of land. This land reform encompassed every village in the country. Until Träslövsläge got a proper harbour of its own, the boats were anchored to the islets Rödskär and Svartskär. Rödskär och Svartskär means Red Islet and Black Islet in Swedish.

They started to build the harbour between 1876 and 1880. A harbour pier was built and a harbour depth of 5–6 feet was established. But this harbour only served its purpose partly. Between 1913 and 1922 a more significant harbour was built. Thereafter the harbour has been improved and has been rebuilt on a number of occasions.
