= Himle (locality) =

- Location within Halland Location within Sweden
- Coordinates: 57°04′N 12°22′E
- Country: Sweden
- Province: Halland
- County: Halland County
- Municipality: Varberg Municipality

Area
  - Total: 0.39 km^{2} (0.15 sq mi)

Population (31 December 2010)
  - Total: 278
  - Density: 707/km^{2} (1,830/sq mi)
- Time zone: UTC+1 (CET)
  - Summer (DST): UTC+2 (CEST)

Himle is a locality situated in Varberg Municipality, Halland County, Sweden, with 278 inhabitants in 2010.
