= John Himle =

American politician (born 1954)

John Himle (born October 10, 1954) was an American politician and businessman.

Himle lived in Bloomington, Minnesota with his wife and family. He graduated from Hayfield High School and received his bachelor's degree in economics and social studies from Gustavus Adolphus College. Himle was involved in the agriculture business. Himle served in the Minnesota House of Representatives from 1981 to 1990 and was a Republican. His great-great-grandfather Erick Clausen Himle also served in the Minnesota Legislature.
