= Erick Clausen Himle =

American politician

Erick Clausen Himle (October 19. 1830 – March 3, 1910) was an American politician and farmer.

Himle was born in Voss, Norway and moved to the United States with his family in 1850. In 1857, Himle moved to Vernon Township, Dodge County, Minnesota and was a farmer. He served as a recruiting officer in Rochester, Minnesota during the American Civil War. Himle served in the Minnesota House of Representatives in 1879 and 1880. Himle died at a hospital in Bismarck, North Dakota. His great-great grandson John Himle also served in the Minnesota Legislature.
