= Rolfstorp =

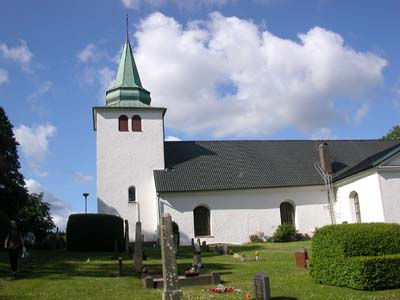
- Rolfstorp church

- Location within Halland Location within Sweden
- Coordinates: 57°09′N 12°29′E
- Country: Sweden
- Province: Halland
- County: Halland County
- Municipality: Varberg Municipality

Area
  - Total: 0.75 km^{2} (0.29 sq mi)

Population (31 December 2010)
  - Total: 513
  - Density: 685/km^{2} (1,770/sq mi)
- Time zone: UTC+1 (CET)
  - Summer (DST): UTC+2 (CEST)

Rolfstorp is a locality and former parish situated in Varberg Municipality, Halland County, Sweden with 513 inhabitants in 2010.

The name is formed out of Rolf (a male name) and thorpe (a new settlement). The latter part makes it likely that the village got its name during the 11th century to 13th century.

== Geography ==
Rolfstorp is on the border between the mostly cultivated coastal area of Halland County and the mostly forest covered inner areas.

== History ==
The western parts of the parish form part of a somewhat larger region, covering areas from Spannarp to Skällinge, which is rich on Iron- and Bronze Age findings. The eastern part of the parish has quite few remains.

== Notable people ==
- The Bocksten Man, well preserved medieval corpse found within the parish
- Ines Uusmann, Swedish minister of communication 1994–1998
