= Tångaberg =

- Location within Halland Location within Sweden
- Coordinates: 57°10′N 12°13′E
- Country: Sweden
- Province: Halland
- County: Halland County
- Municipality: Varberg Municipality

Area
  - Total: 0.47 km^{2} (0.18 sq mi)

Population (31 December 2010)
  - Total: 468
  - Density: 999/km^{2} (2,590/sq mi)
- Time zone: UTC+1 (CET)
  - Summer (DST): UTC+2 (CEST)

Tångaberg is a locality situated in Varberg Municipality, Halland County, Sweden, with 468 inhabitants in 2010.
