= Kungsäter =

- Location within Halland Location within Sweden
- Coordinates: 57°19′N 12°34′E
- Country: Sweden
- Province: Västergötland
- County: Halland County
- Municipality: Varberg Municipality

Area
  - Total: 0.72 km^{2} (0.28 sq mi)

Population (31 December 2010)
  - Total: 353
  - Density: 491/km^{2} (1,270/sq mi)
- Time zone: UTC+1 (CET)
  - Summer (DST): UTC+2 (CEST)

Kungsäter is a locality situated in Varberg Municipality, Halland County, Sweden, with 353 inhabitants in 2010.
