= Skällinge =

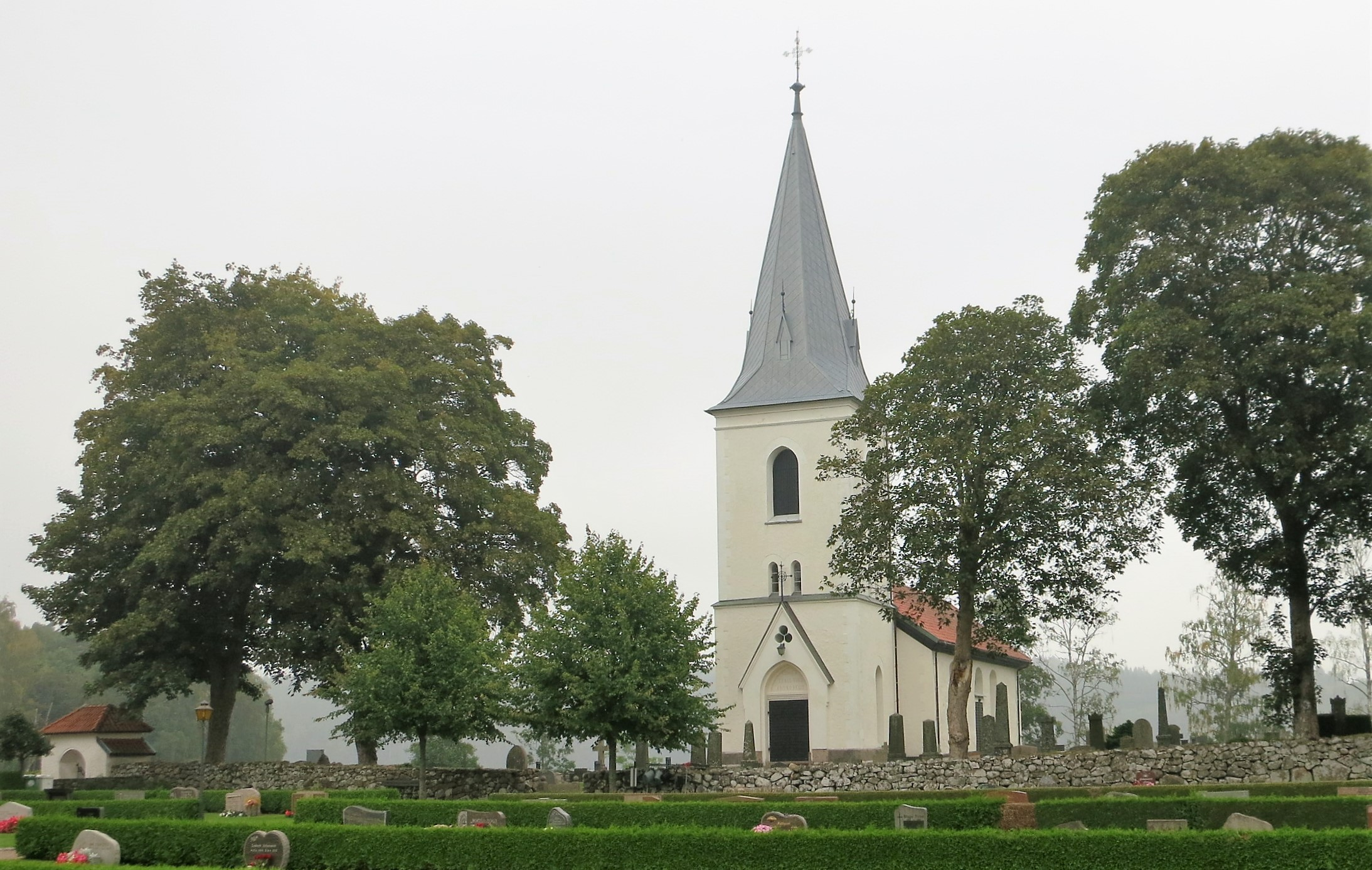
- The church in Skällinge, Halland

- Location within Halland Location within Sweden
- Coordinates: 57°11′N 12°28′E
- Country: Sweden
- Province: Halland
- County: Halland County
- Municipality: Varberg Municipality

Area
  - Total: 0.68 km^{2} (0.26 sq mi)

Population (31 December 2010)
  - Total: 626
  - Density: 915/km^{2} (2,370/sq mi)
- Time zone: UTC+1 (CET)
  - Summer (DST): UTC+2 (CEST)

Skällinge is a locality situated in Varberg Municipality, Halland County, Sweden, with 626 inhabitants in 2010.
