= Veddige =

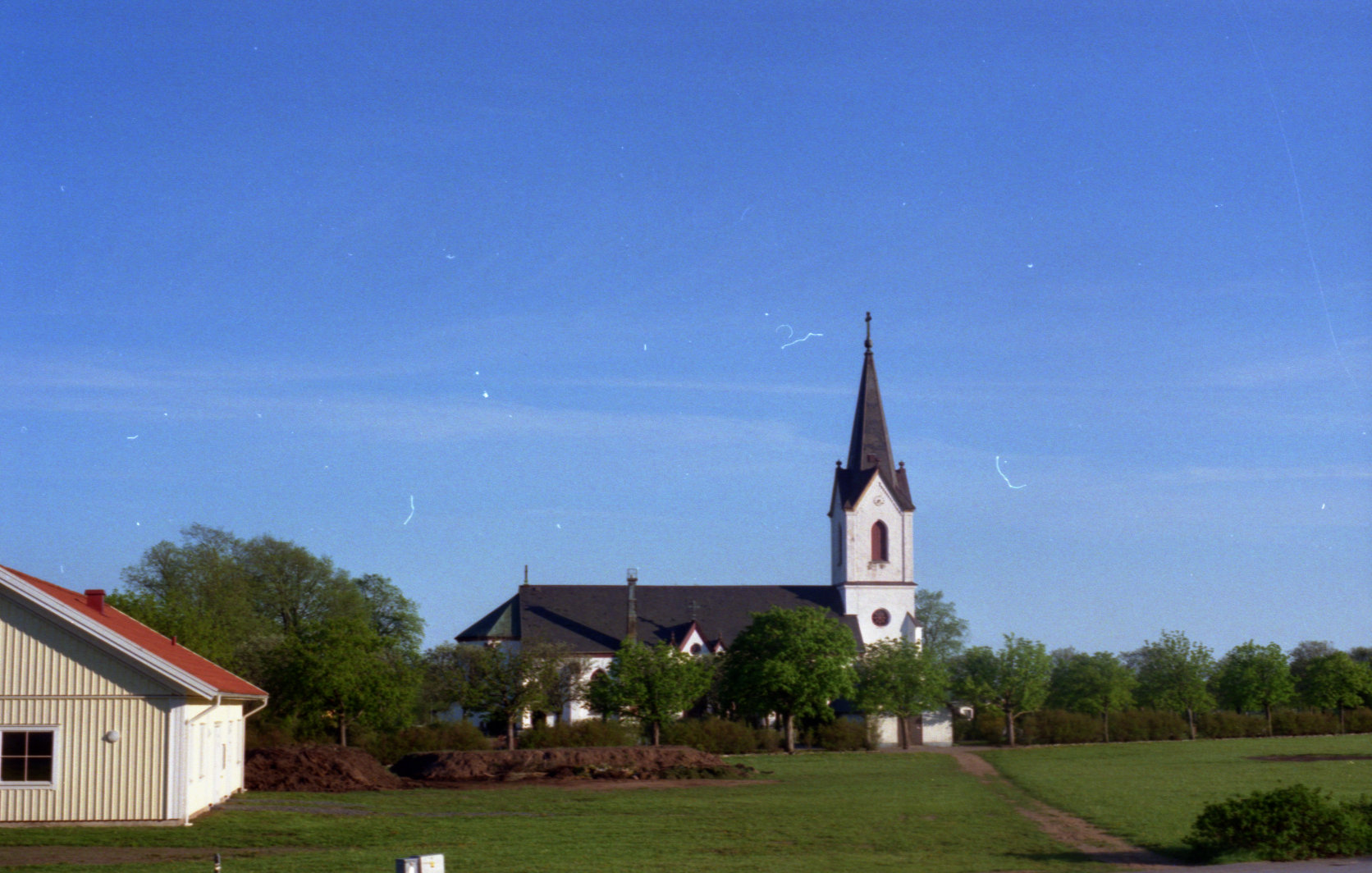
- Photo of Veddige kyrka

- Location within Halland Location within Sweden
- Coordinates: 57°16′N 12°19′E
- Country: Sweden
- Province: Halland
- County: Halland County
- Municipality: Varberg Municipality

Area
  - Total: 1.77 km^{2} (0.68 sq mi)

Population (31 December 2010)
  - Total: 2,045
  - Density: 1,156/km^{2} (2,990/sq mi)
- Time zone: UTC+1 (CET)
  - Summer (DST): UTC+2 (CEST)

Veddige is a locality situated in Varberg Municipality, Halland County, Sweden with 2,045 inhabitants in 2010. It is located near the river Viskan, about 20 km from the central place of Varberg. The scenery of Veddige is dominated by a huge church from the 19th century.

The village gave its name to the parish. The three oldest words for the parish are Wighöger 1347, in Wyghöghä 1378, and Widhöya 1418. Veddige's sports team is the local ice-hockey team, the Veddige Vipers, playing in Division 3 of the Swedish League.
