= Bua, Varberg Municipality =

Bua
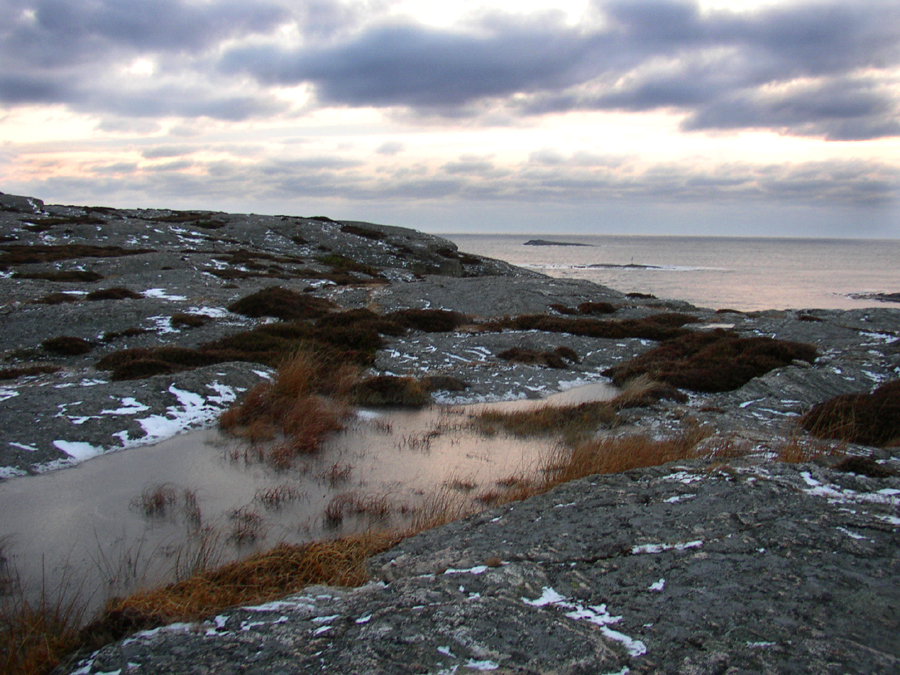
- Bua in January 2008

- Location within Halland Location within Sweden
- Coordinates: 57°14′N 12°08′E
- Country: Sweden
- Province: Halland
- County: Halland County
- Municipality: Varberg Municipality

Area
  - Total: 2.37 km^{2} (0.92 sq mi)

Population (31 December 2020)
  - Total: 2,123
  - Density: 897/km^{2} (2,320/sq mi)
- Time zone: UTC+1 (CET)
  - Summer (DST): UTC+2 (CEST)

Bua is a locality situated in Varberg Municipality, Halland County, Sweden, with 2,123 inhabitants in 2020.
