= Varberg Municipality =

Varberg Municipality Varbergs kommun
- Municipality
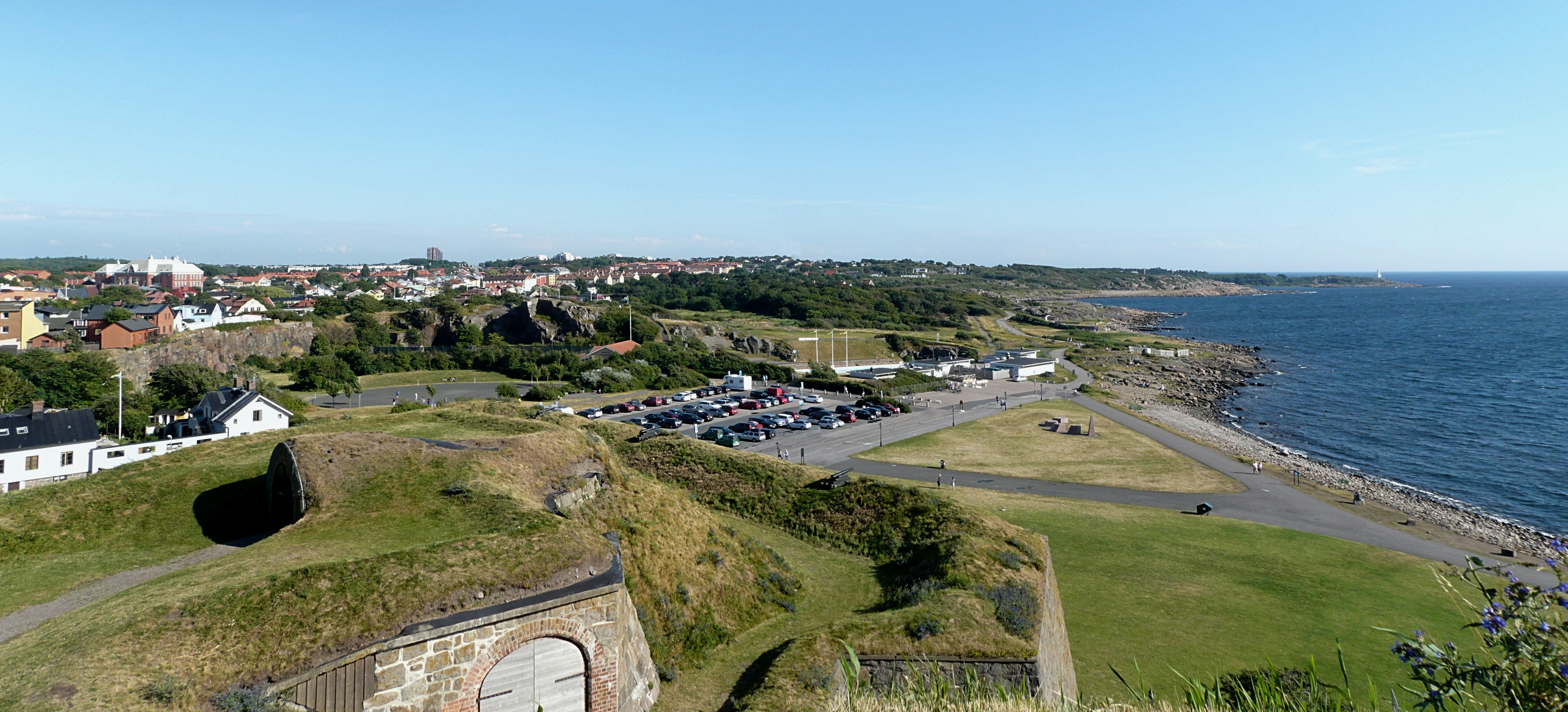

- Coat of arms

- Coordinates: 57°06′N 12°15′E
- Country: Sweden
- County: Halland County
- Seat: Varberg

Area
  - Total: 1,703.35 km^{2} (657.67 sq mi)
  - Land: 868.71 km^{2} (335.41 sq mi)
  - Water: 834.64 km^{2} (322.26 sq mi)
- Area as of 1 January 2014.

Population (30 June 2025)
  - Total: 69,327
  - Density: 79.805/km^{2} (206.69/sq mi)
- Time zone: UTC+1 (CET)
  - Summer (DST): UTC+2 (CEST)
- ISO 3166 code: SE
- Province: Halland and Västergötland
- Municipal code: 1383
- Website: www.varberg.se

Map of Varberg Municipality

Varberg Municipality (Swedish: Varbergs kommun) is a municipality in Halland County, in southwest Sweden. Its seat is in Varberg.

It was formed in 1971 through the amalgamation of the City of Varberg and the surrounding rural municipalities. There are 25 original local government entities included in the municipality.

5,000 people are commuting out from the municipality, mainly to Gothenburg and Falkenberg. 3,200 people are commuting into Falkenberg.

== Localities ==
There are 16 urban areas (also called a tätort or locality) in Varberg Municipality.

In the table the localities are listed according to the size of the population as of December 31, 2005. The municipal seat is in bold characters.

#	Locality	Population
1	**Varberg**	26,041
2	Tvååker	2,390
3	Veddige	2,192
4	Träslövsläge	1,985
5	Bua	1,792
6	Trönninge	847
7	Skällinge	603
8	Södra Näs	600
9	Väröbacka	521
10	Rolfstorp	502
11	Tångaberg	445
12	Åsby	429
13	Kungsäter	360
14	Tofta	350
15	Himle	259
16	Löftaskog	226

== Demographics ==
This is a demographic table based on Varberg Municipality's electoral districts in the 2022 Swedish general election sourced from SVT's election platform, in turn taken from SCB official statistics.

In total there were 66,604 inhabitants, including 51,969 Swedish citizens of voting age. 47.3% voted for the left coalition and 51.7% for the right coalition. Indicators are in percentage points except population totals and income.

Location	Residents	Citizen adults	Left vote	Right vote	Employed	Swedish parents	Foreign heritage	Income SEK	Degree
Location			%	%					
Apelviken-Nygård	1,395	1,234	45.0	54.7	86	92	8	30,266	54
Barnabro-Lugnet-Getterön	1,481	1,154	56.4	42.4	85	80	20	28,043	48
Bläshammar-Trönningenäs	1,982	1,358	46.2	53.0	89	88	12	31,881	51
Breared	2,326	1,793	51.7	47.5	88	82	18	28,775	50
Brunnsberg-Norrdal	1,809	1,515	50.6	47.6	80	69	31	24,597	39
Bua	2,187	1,697	39.1	59.9	85	89	11	26,393	38
Derome-Sällstorp	1,424	1,062	38.6	60.3	88	90	10	27,700	30
Gamleby	1,741	1,670	45.0	54.0	87	85	15	26,782	45
Grimeton-Gödestad	1,868	1,356	40.1	58.6	88	92	8	27,800	35
Håsten	2,136	1,517	55.8	42.2	71	61	39	21,117	24
Hästhaga-Rosenfred	1,660	1,439	51.0	48.2	84	91	9	28,973	49
Karl Gustav-Grimmared	665	526	37.7	61.1	82	92	8	22,932	27
Karlberg	1,717	1,329	55.2	44.3	89	88	12	29,582	53
Kungsäter-Gunnarsjö	833	660	41.6	57.5	84	89	11	23,427	26
Lilla Träslöv	1,604	1,209	48.5	50.2	86	83	17	29,441	51
Lindberg-Tofta-Torpa	1,277	939	40.6	58.9	89	92	8	29,282	38
Lorensberg-Tranelyckan	1,410	1,244	51.6	47.8	80	91	9	24,614	53
Mariedal	1,397	1,133	51.8	47.4	84	83	17	26,583	45
Rolfstorp	1,120	827	45.0	53.1	87	91	9	26,819	32
Sibbarp-Dagsås	883	670	49.5	49.5	80	88	12	25,230	32
Skällinge-Nösslinge	1,100	828	48.2	50.6	86	92	8	26,061	31
Spannarp	723	541	41.1	58.0	92	89	11	27,328	32
Stenåsa-Äckregården	1,710	1,450	54.0	45.1	84	84	16	26,977	43
Stråvalla	1,211	932	41.5	57.8	90	91	9	29,303	40
Sörse-Apelvikshöjd	1,940	1,552	60.4	38.1	76	70	30	21,254	38
Sörse-Ranelid	1,694	1,369	61.2	37.7	74	70	30	22,158	32
Trädlyckan	1,349	1,127	49.5	49.0	85	80	20	26,345	43
Träslöv N	1,591	1,159	49.7	49.8	89	93	7	31,778	47
Träslöv S	1,763	1,300	49.6	50.3	90	89	11	32,731	54
Träslövsläge NV	1,970	1,493	42.3	56.5	89	94	6	30,451	57
Träslövsläge SÖ	1,791	1,299	45.1	53.4	87	92	8	29,560	47
Tvååker V	2,209	1,611	47.3	51.2	83	83	17	25,432	33
Tvååker Ö	1,940	1,452	46.0	53.4	85	88	12	25,917	32
Trönninge-Göingegården	2,674	1,863	47.2	51.7	89	85	15	31,022	50
Tångaberg-Kärra-Åskloster	1,885	1,515	40.9	57.8	85	91	9	29,498	44
Valinge-Stamnared	1,094	823	40.5	58.6	88	94	6	26,535	35
Varberg Centrum N	1,723	1,503	50.5	47.8	78	82	18	24,373	42
Varberg Centrum S	1,683	1,591	46.9	52.1	82	89	11	26,274	47
Veddige V	1,958	1,496	43.9	55.3	86	86	14	25,505	34
Veddige Ö	1,463	987	42.1	57.1	81	78	22	23,895	26
Värö	2,218	1,746	39.3	60.0	85	88	12	25,372	32
Source: SVT

== International relations ==
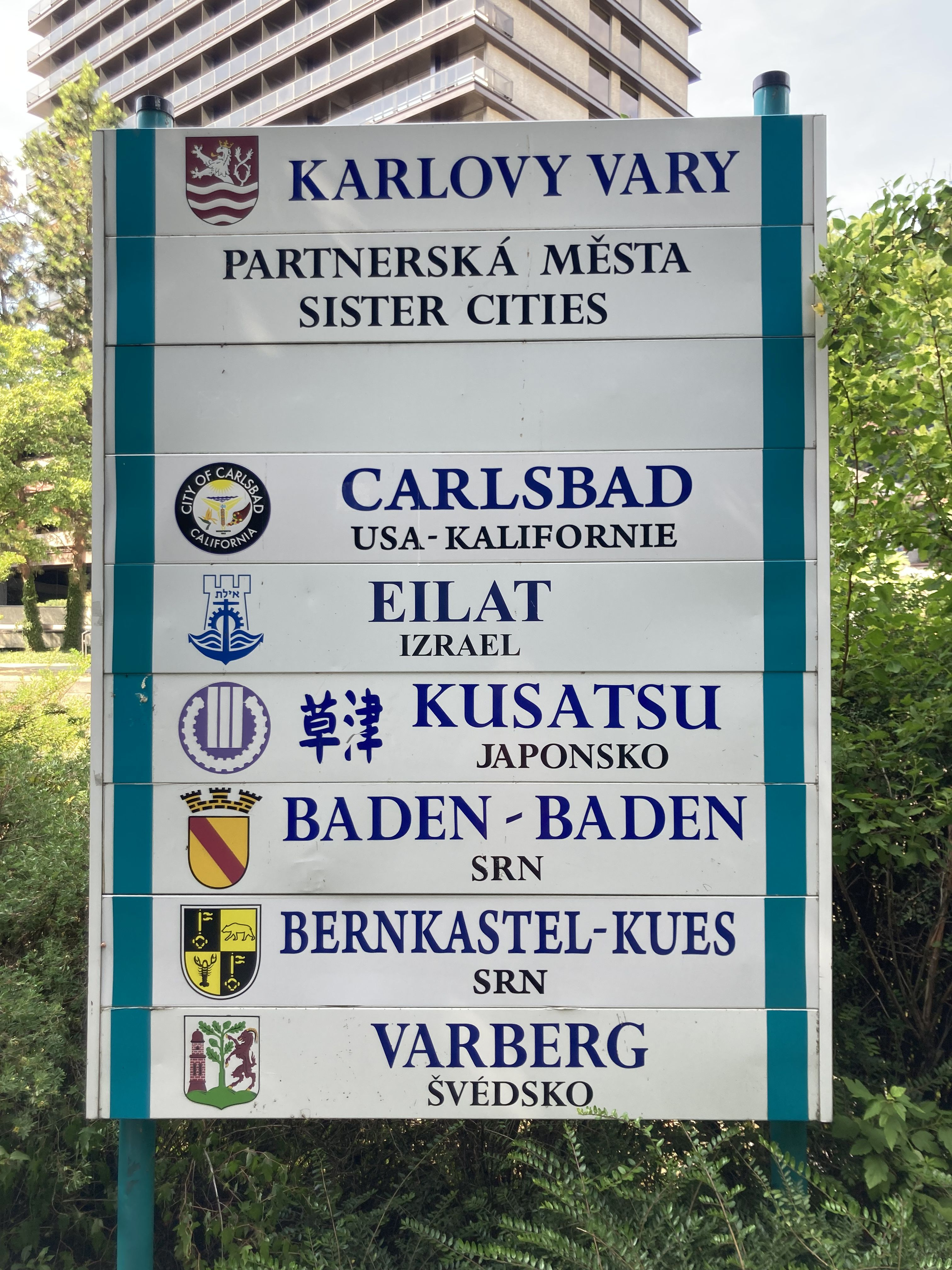
Sign of Karlovy Vary's sister cities

=== Twin towns — Sister cities ===
The municipality is twinned with:

- Karlovy Vary, Czech Republic
- Haderslev Municipality, Denmark
- Tartumaa, Estonia
- Uusikaupunki, Finland
- Sandefjord, Norway
