= Löddeköpinge =

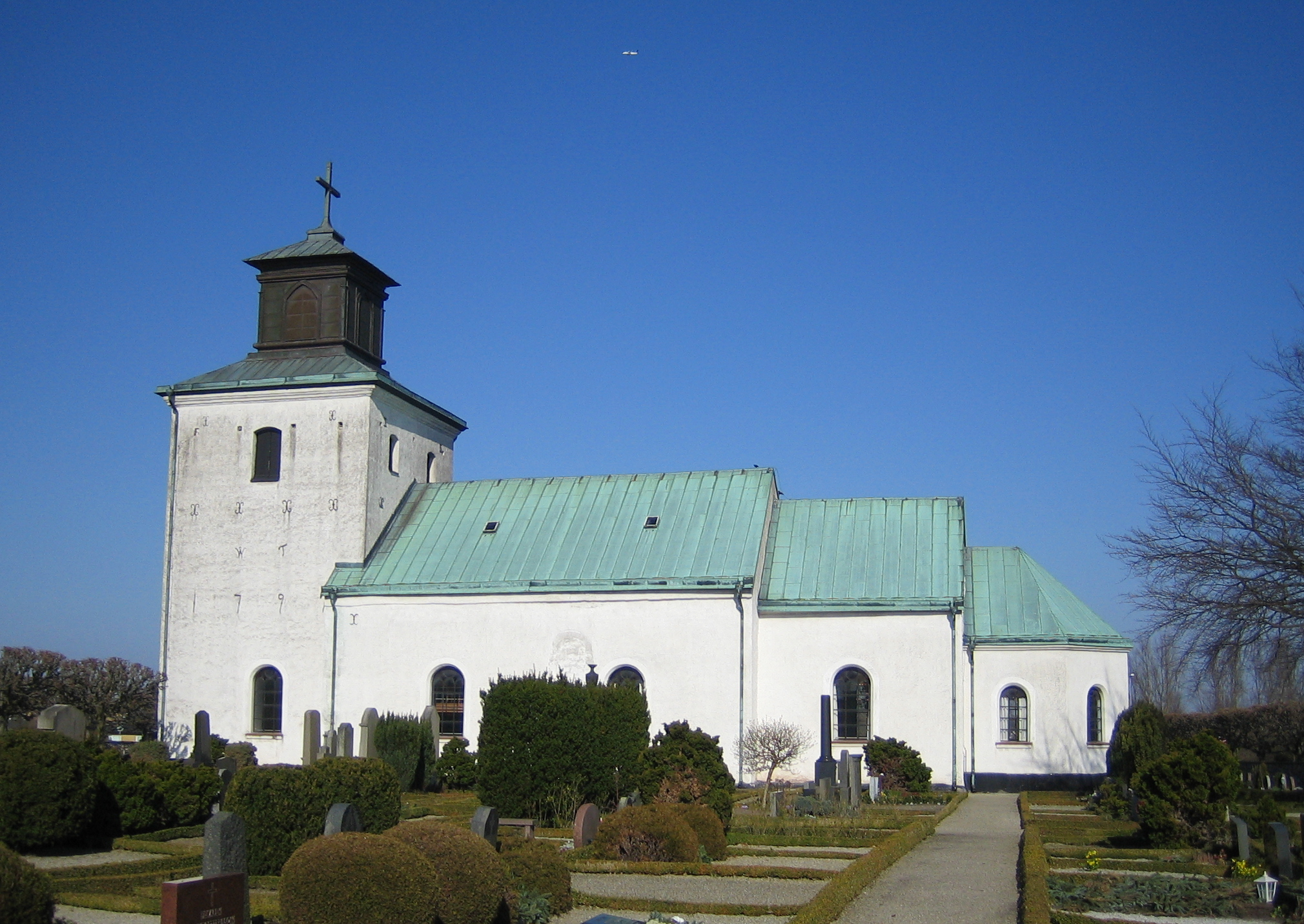
- Löddeköpinge Church

- Location within Scania Location within Sweden Location within European Union
- Coordinates: 55°46′N 13°01′E
- Country: Sweden
- Province: Scania
- County: Scania County
- Municipality: Kävlinge Municipality

Area
  - Total: 3.62 km^{2} (1.40 sq mi)

Population (31 December 2010)
  - Total: 6,290
  - Density: 1,740/km^{2} (4,500/sq mi)
- Time zone: UTC+1 (CET)
  - Summer (DST): UTC+2 (CEST)

Löddeköpinge is the second-largest locality in Kävlinge Municipality, Scania County, Sweden, with 6,290 inhabitants as of 2010.

Löddeköpinge is about 10 km southwest of the municipal seat Kävlinge and about 5 km from Barsebäck nuclear power plant.

The locality lies in the former parish of Löddeköpinge, which was an annex (subordinate) parish to that of Borgeby, located in the härad of Harjager and in the deanery of Torna and Diocese of Lund. In 1911 it covered 1884 hectares and had 1131 inhabitants. As a division of the Church of Sweden, Löddeköpinge parish became Borgeby's mother parish in 1937 and was transferred to the deanery of Harjager in 1939. Since 1962, it has been merged with Borgeby, Barsebäck, Hofterup and Hög as a single parish in the deanery of Rönneberga.
