= Battle of Dösjebro =

The Battle at Dösjebro
Date	1181
Location	Dösjebro, Scania, Sweden
Result	Decisive Royal victory

Belligerents
Royalists	Scanian rebels

Commanders and leaders
Valdemar I Absalon	Unknown

Strength
~4000-6000 forces of zealand and blekinge Veterans of the Wendish raids	~5000-10000 peasant levies

Casualties and losses
relatively minor, maybe 500-800	~2000-5000 slain or captured

The Battle of Dösjebro, in older texts known as The Battle of Dysie Bro, was a 12th century land battle fought between Scanian rebels and the Kingdom of Denmark. The battle was fought near the village of Dösjebro, not far from Lund. The Danish professional army under King Valdemar the Great and Bishop Absalon met the peasant army of Scanian rebels.

== Background ==
After the first Danish civil war, the provinces that once belonged to Sweyn were purged and replaced with relatives of the Hvide nobles, who were Valdemar's staunchest supporters. After more than 10 years under Hvide rule, the Scanians demanded King Valdemar the Great to replace these nobles because they did not respect Scanian culture (the Hvide nobles were Jutes). Angered by their demands Valdemar rejected them. The Scanian were further enraged and sent further demands, they wanted new nobles and also to stop paying church tithes as that went against Scanian tradition. This enraged the King further and he rebuked them and completely denied them. The Scanians became further enraged. They challenged Valdemar's claim to the throne, and Absalon's legitimacy as an Archbishop. The king raised his army in Zealand (the most populous Danish land), hoping to intimidate them, but this angered the Scanian further and they began an open revolt. Seeing the size of the peasant mobs, he travelled to Blekinge, raised more levies and then he marched for Lund.

== Battle ==
The peasant army fortified their positions in order to repel the royal cavalry and enforce their demands. The royal cavalry assembled at the Dysie river (now named Välabäcken, a tributary to Saxån), where there was only one bridge. When the royal force arrived the rebels were surprised to see no cavalry. Nonetheless, the royal army took the bridge and attacked their fortified positions again and again. The sheer mass of men at the bridge prevented a royal break through. The tide turned and the rebels began retaking much of the bridge and pushing the Royalists back. The rebels began crowding the bridge, preventing retreat by those on it. The only way off the bridge was by advancing through the royal army. Unbeknownst to the rebels, this was Valdemar's and Absalon's plan. The royalists had brought cavalry, and had predicted the rebel positioning and tactics.

Absalon led the cavalry across the river out of sight. The peasants were surprised to see them approaching from their flank. The peasants who were not on the bridge fled towards Lund, but the rest of the rebels (funneled between two forces on the bridge) were killed or captured.

Reimagination of the battle

== Aftermath ==
The peasants who fled were pursued by King Valdemar who took charge of the cavalry and intercepted them before they could hide behind the walls of Lund. Realizing the hopelessness of their position the entire rebel force surrendered.

The rebels pleaded with the king, telling him it was not Scanian law that they should pay tithes. He responded that the ministers of God must be provided for. Valdemar told them that no tithes would be demanded of them, but instead, they should donate a tenth of a year's income to the church.

So it was arranged and has been to this day, that there are no Church tithes in Skaane, only voluntary gifts. Valdemar made embedsmænd from those in the province after this, since it was seen that although the bonders were reasonable men who would listen to persuasion, they would persuade themselves wrongly and against the interests of Church and realm unless they had leaders who understood the general interest of all and not merely of their own herreds.

== Sources ==
- Steenstrup, Johannes (1904). Danmarks Riges Historie, bind 1. Oldtiden og den ældre Middelalder. København.
