= Frey Samsioe =

Swedish civil engineer

Carl Axel Frey Samsioe (9 October 1890, Hörby, Malmöhus County – 20 March 1972) was a Swedish civil engineer, specializing in road construction and water-power engineering.

C. A. Frey Samsioe graduated in 1912 in engineering at the Royal Institute of Technology in Stockholm and in 1935 received his doctorate in engineering. He was employed at the Swedish construction company Vattenbyggnadsbyrån in 1912–1916 and 1919–1955, as well as at the Whangpoo Conservancy Board in Shanghai in 1917–1918. He was elected in 1931 as a member of the Royal Swedish Academy of Engineering Sciences.

In 1924 in London, Samsioe presented a paper at the first World Power Conference. He was an Invited Speaker of the ICM in 1924 at Toronto.
