= Lilla Harrie =

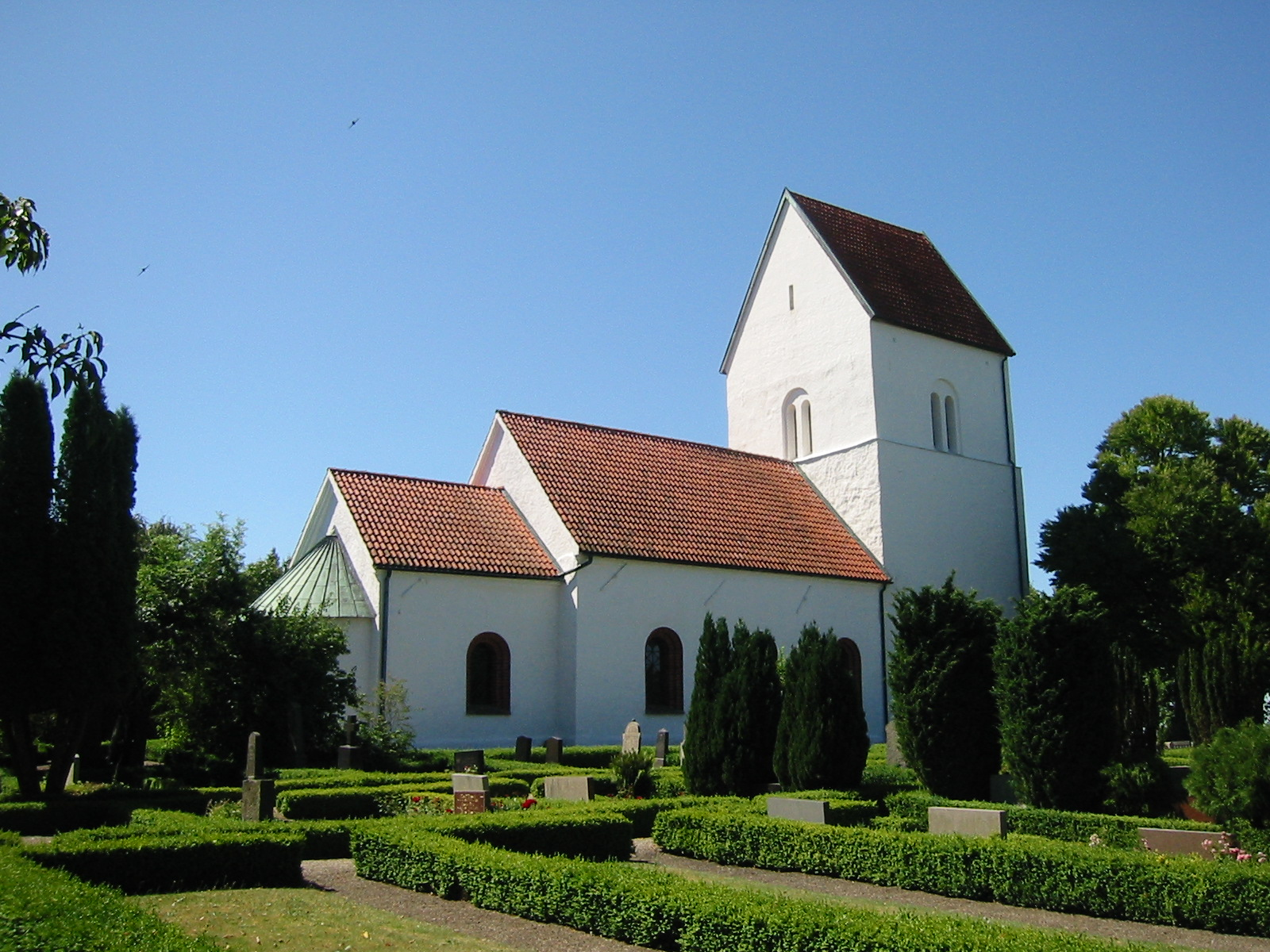
- Lilla Harrie Church

- Location within Skåne Location within Sweden
- Coordinates: 55°48′N 13°12′E
- Country: Sweden
- Province: Skåne
- County: Skåne County
- Municipality: Kävlinge Municipality

Area
  - Total: 0.41 km^{2} (0.16 sq mi)

Population (31 December 2010)
  - Total: 371
  - Density: 909/km^{2} (2,350/sq mi)
- Time zone: UTC+1 (CET)
  - Summer (DST): UTC+2 (CEST)

Lilla Harrie (Swedish pronunciation: [ˈlɪ̂lːaˌharːɪɛ]) is a locality situated in Kävlinge Municipality, Skåne County, Sweden with 371 inhabitants in 2010.

Here is situated Lilla Harrie Valskvarn, Sweden's oldest mill still in existence, founded in 1509 and bought by the archbishop. The purchase was approved and thereby registered. It is believed that the mill is much older.

== The Battle of Lund ==
The Swedish army, under the leadership of King Charles XI, made camp in Lilla Harrie, one month before the skirmish. On the night of 4 December 1676, the Swedes made a successful flanking manoeuvre, by crossing the frozen Kävlinge River. Thereby surprised King Christian V and his Danish army, who later on lost the Battle of Lund. The skirmish was one of the Scandinavians' bloodiest; 9000 soldiers lost their lives.

== Lilla Harrie Engineering AB ==
The company founder's name was Nils Holmqvist, who was born in 1851. He started a small workshop in Östraby when he was 27 years old. Together with carpenter Per Paulsson, where he produced, among other things, horse-powered threshers and later a steam-powered combine harvester. In 1890 he bought an old smithy in Lilla Harrie. Besides shoeing horses and repairing peasants' equipment, they started to make wagons, plows, horseshoes, cultivators and more. Many artisans were employed.

When the railway came to the village in 1905 the work became impractical and 1-acre (4,000 m^{2}) of land was purchased next to the track. The first industrial building was completed in 1906 with a power source for machinery in the form of an 8 hp (6.0 kW) kerosene engine. The staff was in 1918 just over 100 people.

During World War II, the business expanded and new buildings were constructed for welding and painting. The huge factory hall (30 × 105 m) was built in 1966. The company employed a staff of 135 people in 1976. Mainly because of failing market and the launch of a multiline sugar beet harvester, which according to hearsay, erosion of working capital, the company ceased operations in 1981 after almost 100 years.
