= Osbyholm =

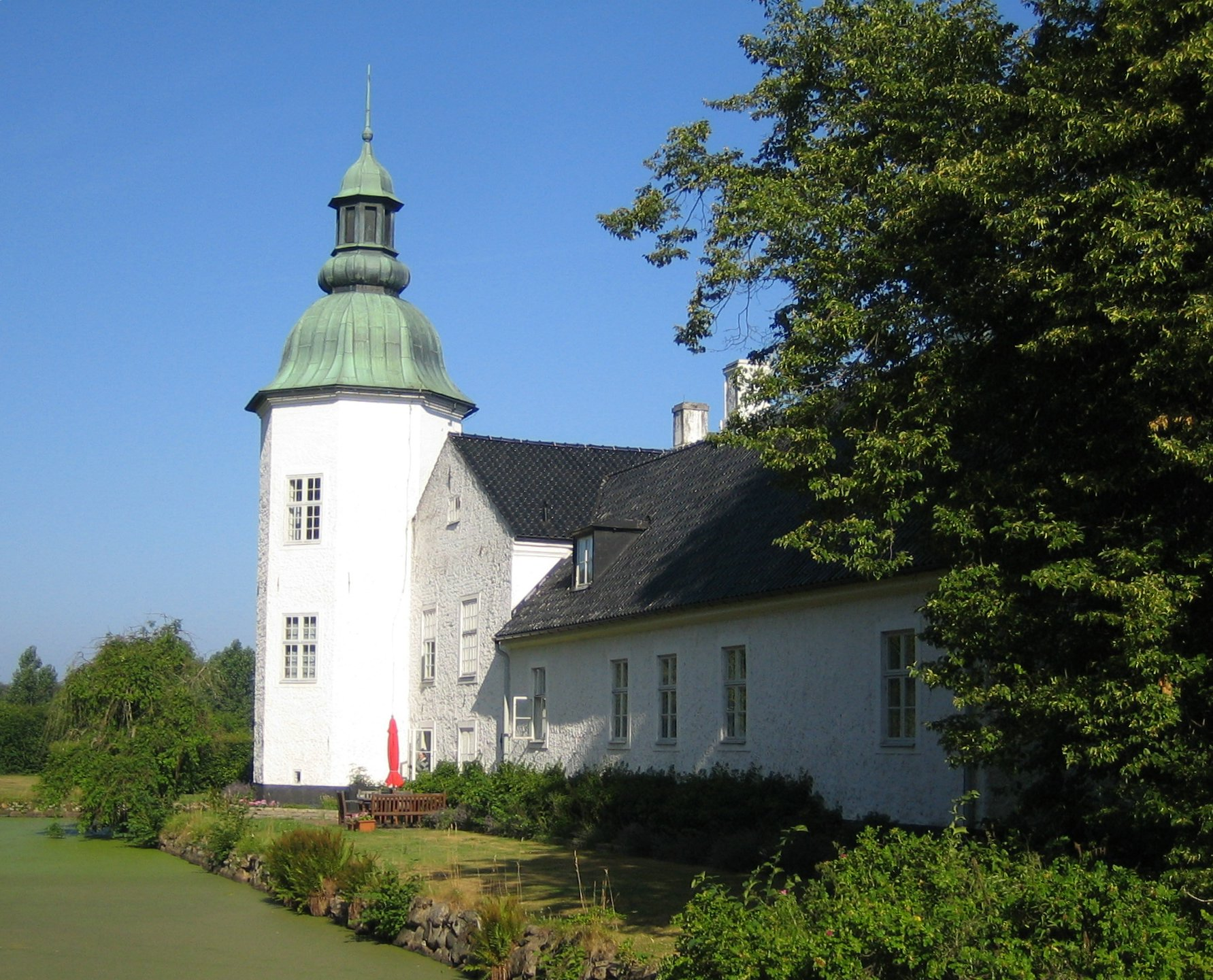
- Osbyholm Castle

- Location within Skåne Location within Sweden
- Coordinates: 55°51′N 13°36′E
- Country: Sweden
- Province: Skåne
- County: Skåne County
- Municipality: Hörby Municipality

Area
  - Total: 0.40 km^{2} (0.15 sq mi)

Population (31 December 2010)
  - Total: 269
  - Density: 669/km^{2} (1,730/sq mi)
- Time zone: UTC+1 (CET)
  - Summer (DST): UTC+2 (CEST)

Osbyholm is a locality situated in Hörby Municipality, Skåne County, Sweden with 269 inhabitants in 2010.
