= Ryberg =

Ryberg is a surname. Notable people with the surname include:

- Freja Ryberg (1832–1920), Finnish stage actress
- Inez Scott Ryberg (1901–1980), American classical archaeologist and academic
- Ivar Ryberg (1885–1929), Swedish rower
- Karen Ryberg, American hydrologist and environmental statistician
- Roger Ryberg (born 1952), Norwegian politician
- W. Greg Ryberg (born 1946), American politician
