= Billy Berntsson =

Swedish footballer

Personal information
- Date of birth: 6 January 1984 (age 42)
- Place of birth: Karlskrona, Sweden
- Height: 1.80 m (5 ft 11 in)
- Position: Defender

Senior career*
Years	Team	Apps	(Gls)
2002–2003	Malmö FF	4	(0)
2004–2006	Herfølge BK	18	(0)
2006–2007	Falkenbergs FF	37	(1)
2008–2010	GIF Sundsvall	77	(0)
2011	Kilmarnock	4	(0)
2012–2013	Hammarby IF	26	(0)
2014– 2014	Valur	11	(0)
2014–2016	Qormi FC	15	(0)

International career^{‡}
2001	Sweden U17	5	(1)
2003	Sweden U19	3	(0)
- * Club domestic league appearances and goals as of 6 November 2014 ‡ National team caps and goals as of 20 August 2013

Billy Berntsson (born 6 December 1984, in Hofterup) is a Swedish footballer who plays as a defender and is currently unsigned.

A product of the youth system at Malmö FF, Berntsson has also played for Herfølge BK, Falkenbergs FF and GIF Sundsvall.

After rejecting a new contract with GIF Sundsvall, Berntsson impressed enough whilst on trial at Kilmarnock to be offered a 2 1/2-year deal in January 2011.

In January 2012 Berntsson signed a 2+1 year deal with Swedish Superettan team Hammarby.
