= Västra Karaby =

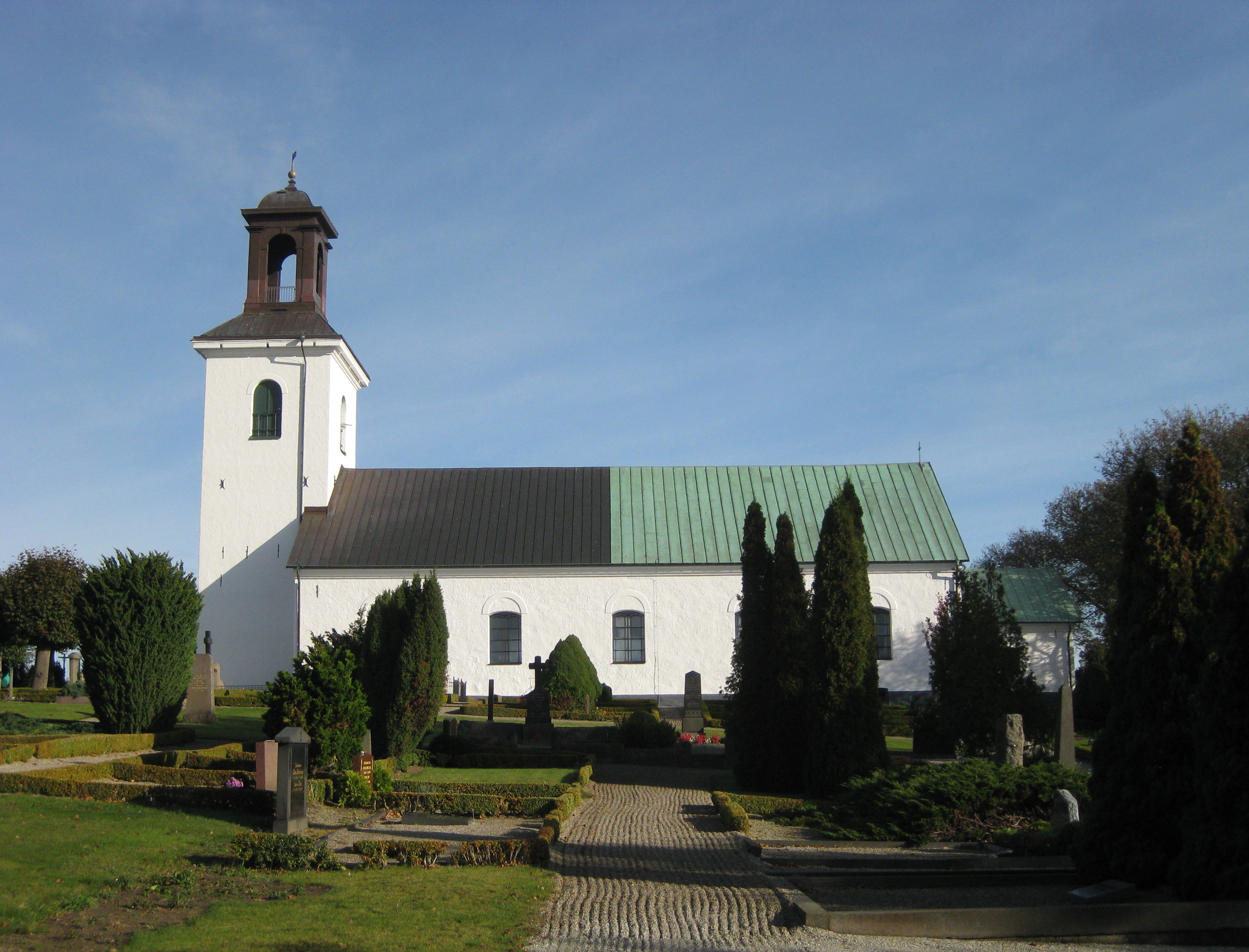
- Västra Karaby Church

- Location within Skåne Location within Sweden
- Coordinates: 55°48′45″N 13°03′10″E
- Country: Sweden
- Province: Skåne
- County: Skåne County
- Municipality: Kävlinge Municipality

Area
  - Total: 0.49 km^{2} (0.19 sq mi)

Population (31 December 2010)
  - Total: 229
  - Density: 468/km^{2} (1,210/sq mi)
- Time zone: UTC+1 (CET)
  - Summer (DST): UTC+2 (CEST)

Västra Karaby is a locality situated in Kävlinge Municipality, Skåne County, Sweden with 229 inhabitants in 2010.
