= Barsebäck =

Swedish locality

Barsebäck, Sweden
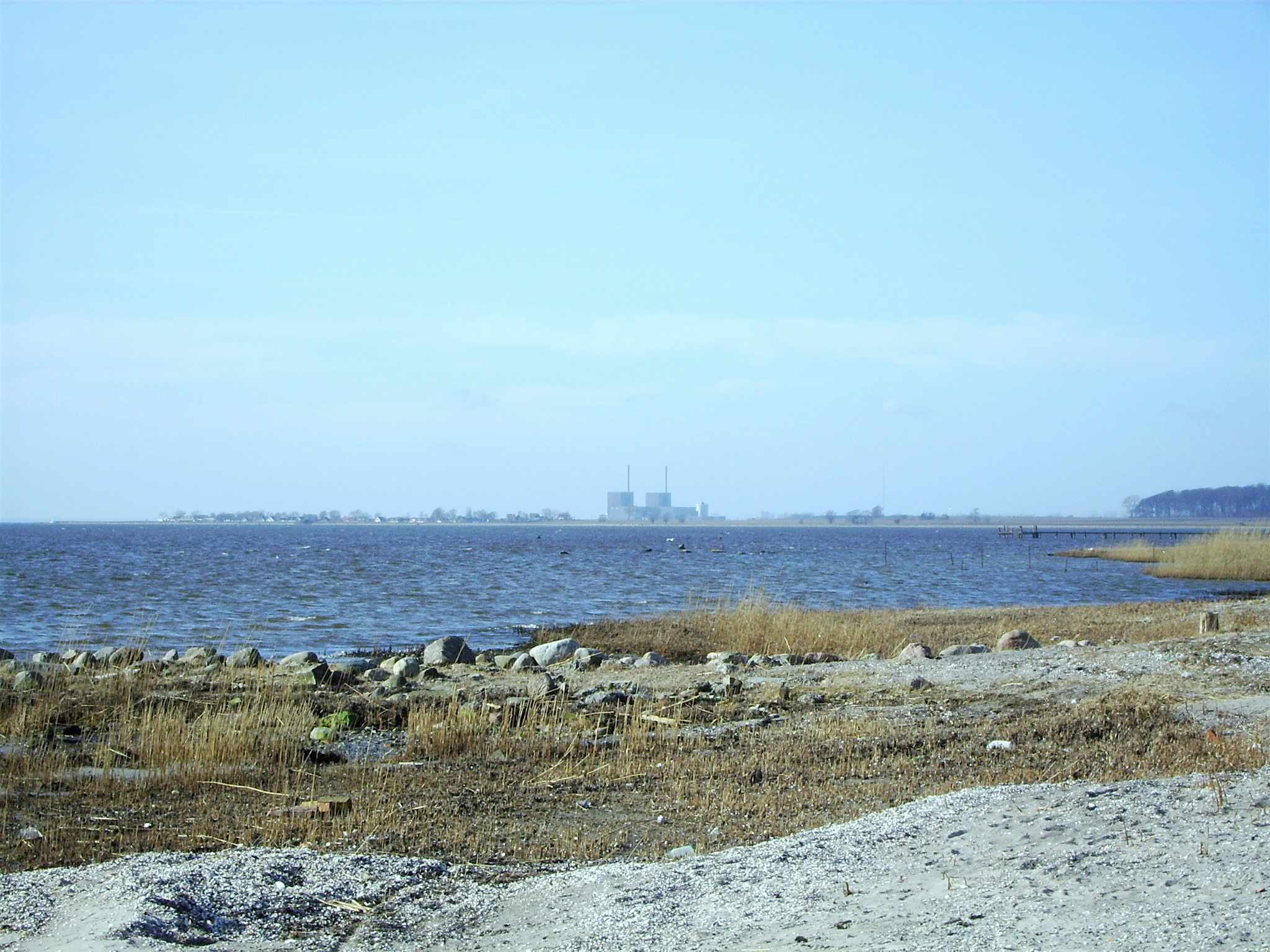
- Barsebäck Nuclear Power Plant seen from Bjärred

- Location within Skåne Location within Sweden
- Coordinates: 55°46′15″N 12°57′20″E
- Country: Sweden
- Province: Skåne
- County: Skåne County
- Municipality: Kävlinge Municipality

Area
  - Total: 0.44 km^{2} (0.17 sq mi)

Population (31 December 2010)
  - Total: 524
  - Density: 1,185/km^{2} (3,070/sq mi)
- Time zone: UTC+1 (CET)
  - Summer (DST): UTC+2 (CEST)

Barsebäck (Swedish pronunciation: [ˈbâʂːɛˌbɛk]) is a locality situated in Kävlinge Municipality, Skåne County, Sweden with 524 inhabitants in 2010.

It lies about 4 km east of the harbour village Barsebäckshamn. It is known for the now closed Barsebäck Nuclear Power Plant, and for the internationally known golf course Barsebäck Golf & Country Club with an annual world class golf tournament.

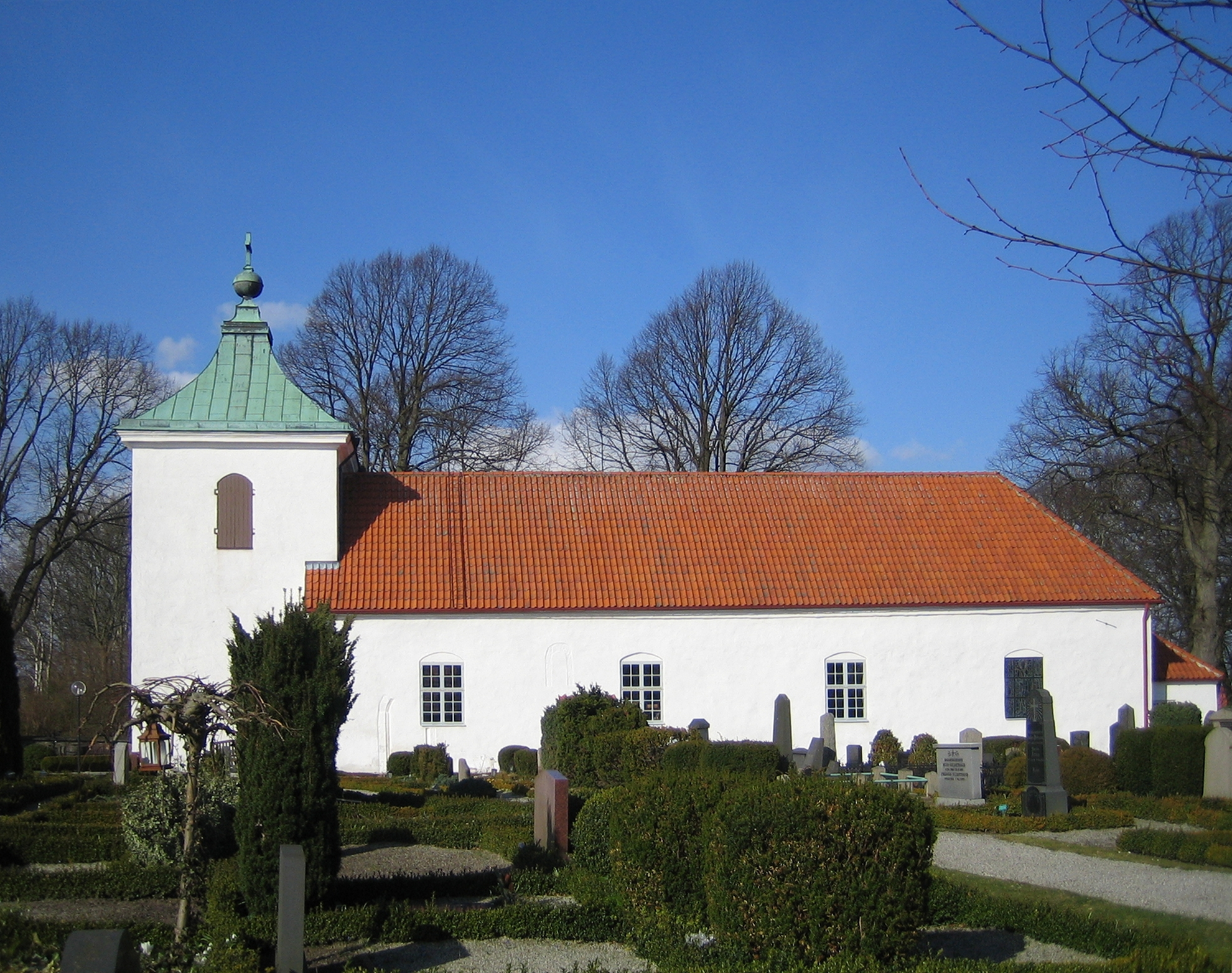
Barsebäck Church
