= Osbyholm Castle =

Castle in Scania, Sweden

- Osbyholms slott
- Hörby Municipality
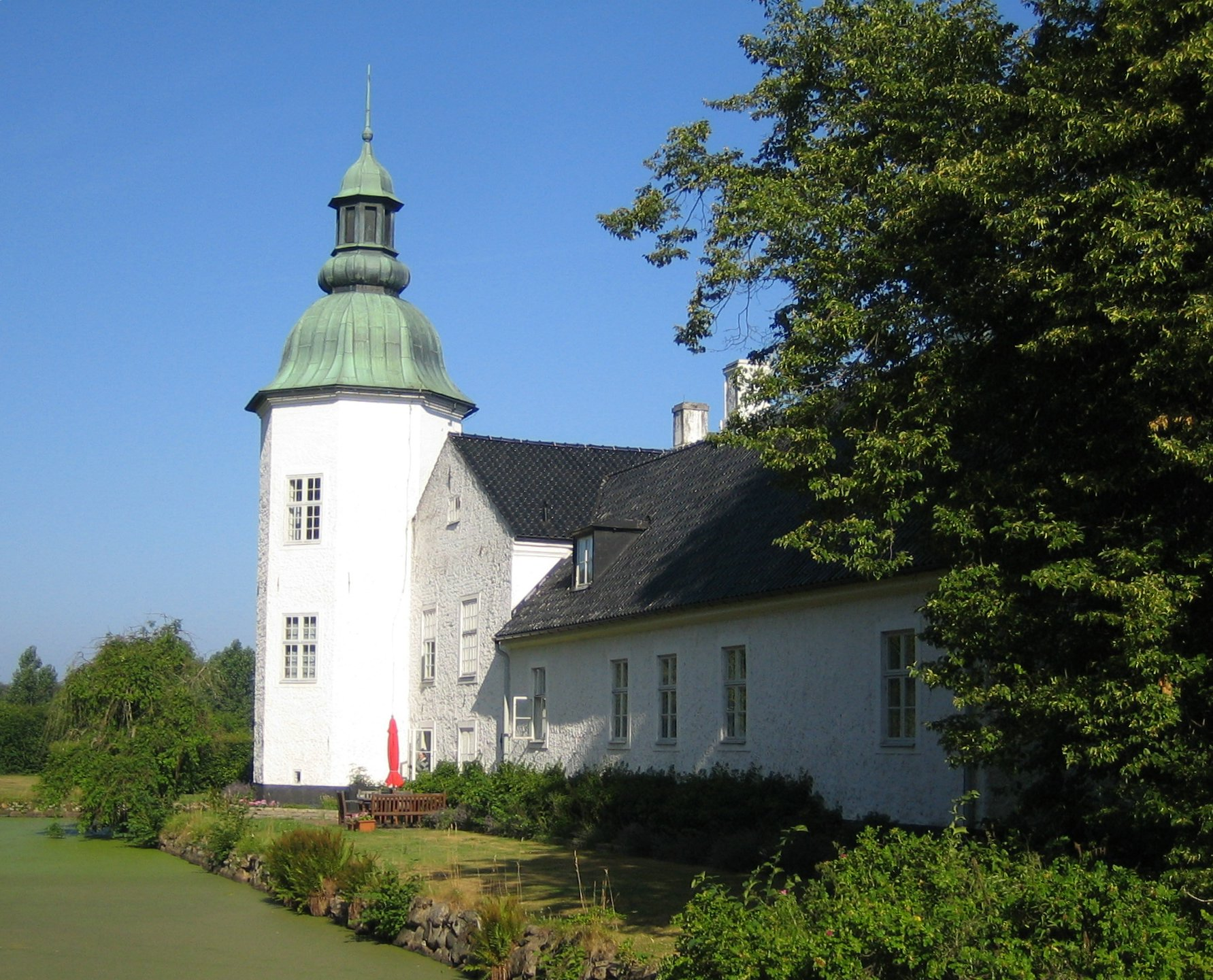
- Osbyholm Castle

Site information
- Type: Castle
- Open to the public: Unknown

Location
- Scania, Sweden
- Location within Skåne
- Coordinates: 55.851°N 13.601°E

Site history
- Built: 17th century

Osbyholm Castle (Swedish: Osbyholms slott) is a castle at Hörby Municipality in Scania, Sweden.

== History ==
Osbyholm Castle was built during the first half of the 17th century, probably during the time the estate was owned by Lene Ramel, daughter of Danish royal councilor Henrik Ramel (1601-1653), country commissioner of Scania. The estate was inherited by Ove Ramel (1637-1685). Following the Treaty of Roskilde in 1658, Scania became a possession of the Swedish Crown. Osbyholm Castle was sold to Olof Nilsson Engelholm from Malmö. In 1750, an extensive restoration of Osbyholm were made. In 1853, a new central part was built, which was provided with a third floor with a flat, balustrade-edged roof. In 1931, Baroness Anna Trolle had the castle rebuilt according to drawings by the architect Leon Nilsson.

== See also ==
- List of castles in Sweden
