= Hörby Municipality =

Hörby Municipality Hörby kommun
- Municipality
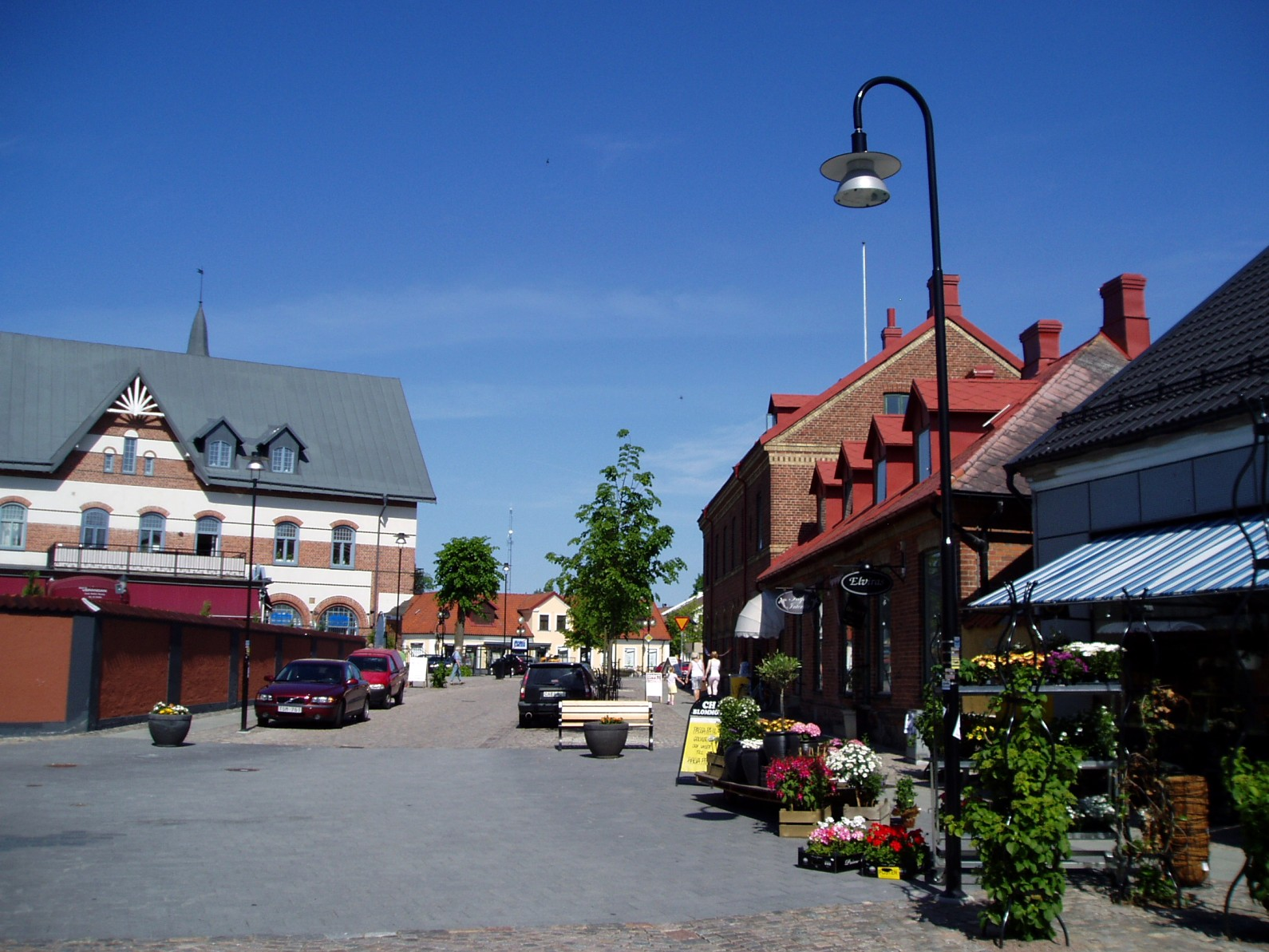

- Coat of arms

- Coordinates: 55°51′N 13°39′E
- Country: Sweden
- County: Skåne County
- Seat: Hörby

Government
  - Mayor: Cecilia Bladh in Zito (SD)

Area
  - Total: 433.05 km^{2} (167.20 sq mi)
  - Land: 419.41 km^{2} (161.94 sq mi)
  - Water: 13.64 km^{2} (5.27 sq mi)
- Area as of 1 January 2014

Population (30 June 2025)
  - Total: 15,509
  - Density: 36.978/km^{2} (95.773/sq mi)
- Time zone: UTC+1 (CET)
  - Summer (DST): UTC+2 (CEST)
- ISO 3166 code: SE
- Province: Scania
- Municipal code: 1266
- Website: www.horby.se

Hörby Municipality (Swedish: Hörby kommun) is a municipality in the central part of Skåne County in southern Sweden. Its seat is located in the town of Hörby.

The present municipality consists of ten original entities merged to each other in 1952, 1969 and 1974.

== Geography ==
The geography is varied with a few forests, some lakes and streams and farmland and even wildlife. Hörby is one of the most meadow-filled municipalities in Sweden.

=== Localities ===
There are 3 urban areas (also called a Tätort or locality) in Hörby Municipality. In the table they are listed according to the size of the population as of December 31, 2005. The municipal seat is in bold characters.

#	Locality	Population
1	**Hörby**	6965
2	Ludvigsborg	743
3	Osbyholm	260

== Demographics ==
This is a demographic table based on Hörby Municipality's electoral districts in the 2022 Swedish general election sourced from SVT's election platform, in turn taken from SCB official statistics.

In total there were 15,716 inhabitants, including 11,943 Swedish citizens of voting age. 33.2% voted for the left coalition and 65.8% for the right coalition. Indicators are in percentage points except population totals and income.

Location	Residents	Citizen adults	Left vote	Right vote	Employed	Swedish parents	Foreign heritage	Income SEK	Degree
Location			%	%					
Folkets hus	2,887	2,130	33.1	66.3	75	79	21	22,542	30
Frostaskolan	2,327	1,831	36.0	63.2	82	87	13	23,576	34
Ludvigsborg	1,609	1,239	29.5	69.4	86	90	10	27,133	39
Lyby-Georgshill	2,216	1,686	33.5	66.0	83	85	15	25,348	30
Långaröd	1,159	903	34.3	63.7	82	89	11	23,566	35
Svensköp	1,061	807	33.4	65.6	84	92	8	25,136	37
Älvdalsskolan	2,785	2,053	33.3	65.7	79	78	22	24,158	30
Östraby-Västerstad	1,672	1,294	28.9	69.7	84	89	11	25,809	33
Source: SVT

== History ==
Some historians claim Hörby was founded in the 9th century A.D., but the truth is that no one knows exactly how old the village is. During the Middle Ages Hörby evolved into a centre of commerce, much due to its location, right in the middle of Skåne. The name "Hörby" comes from the old word "horg" which today would translate into "barrow" or "mound". As the name hints the woods surrounding Hörby are filled with old burial mounds (some dating back to the Bronze Age) and also some old cult places from the pre-Christian religion of asatru. The same word has given name to the neighbouring village of Höör.

== Culture ==
Hörby Municipality still has much of the old cultural heritage remaining in the villages.

Hörby is famous for being home to one of the transmitting stations specified on old MF radio receivers. The broadcasting signals (radio, TV) are still transmitted from the Teracom transmitting station in Östra Sallerup, 7 km south of the town of Hörby. MF transmissions do not occur from Hörby any more, but from the new transmitter in Sölvesborg, inaugurated in 1985, at the coast of the Baltic Sea.

On the first Wednesday and Thursday in July every year since 1748, the Hörby Market (Hörby Marknad) is held. It attracts thousands of visitors and is one of the three main traditional markets in Skåne together with the markets of Kivik and Sjöbo.

The most famous personality from Hörby was the author Victoria Benedictsson (1850–1888).

Håkan Dahlby was born in Västerstad, in Hörby municipality.

== Gallery ==
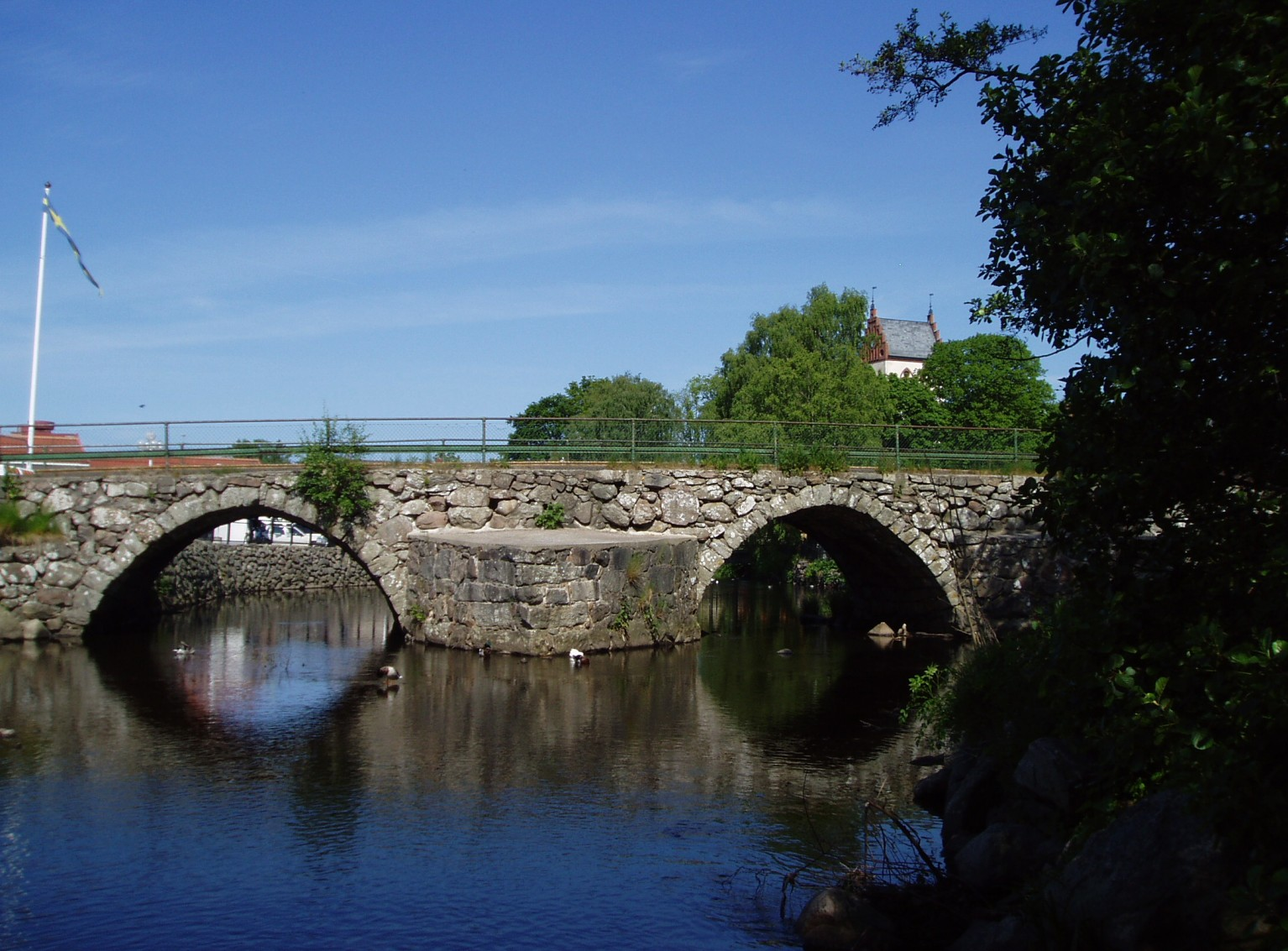
Bridge in Hörby

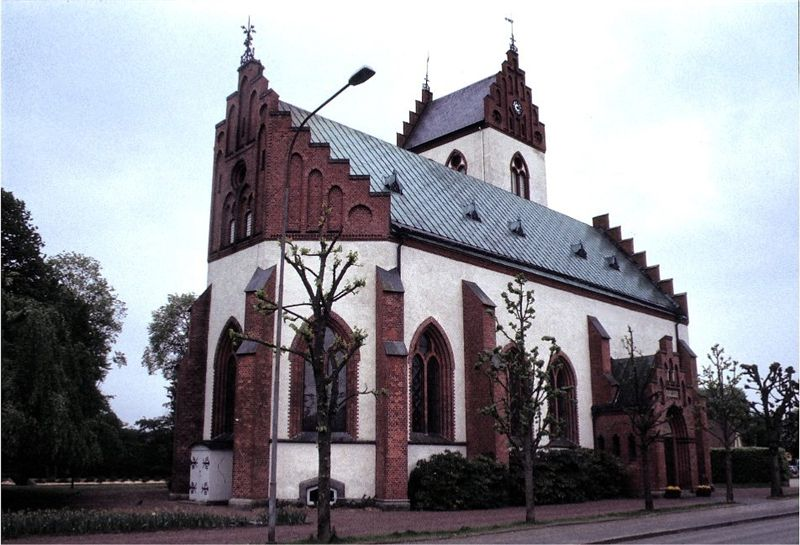
Hörby church

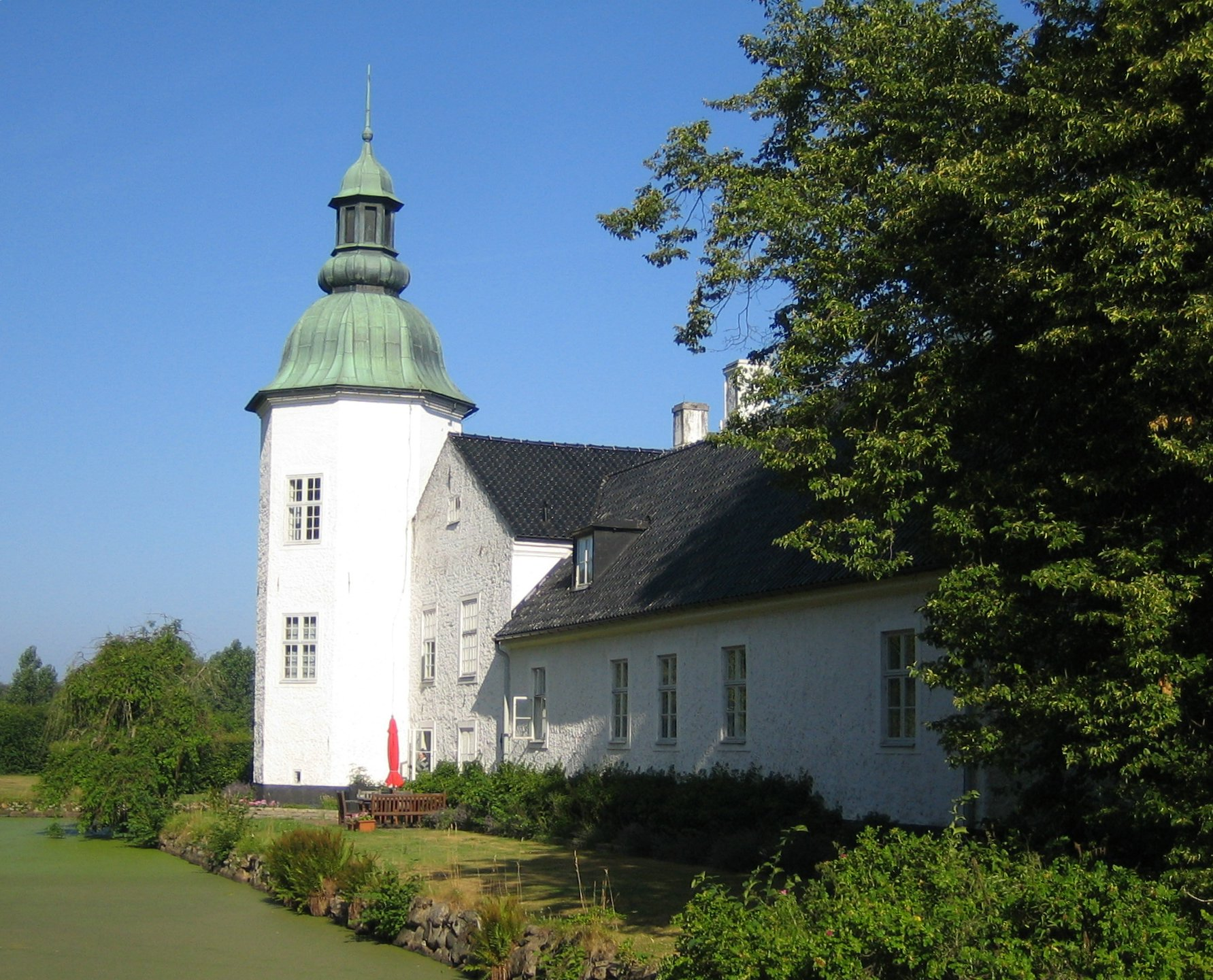
Osbyholm castle

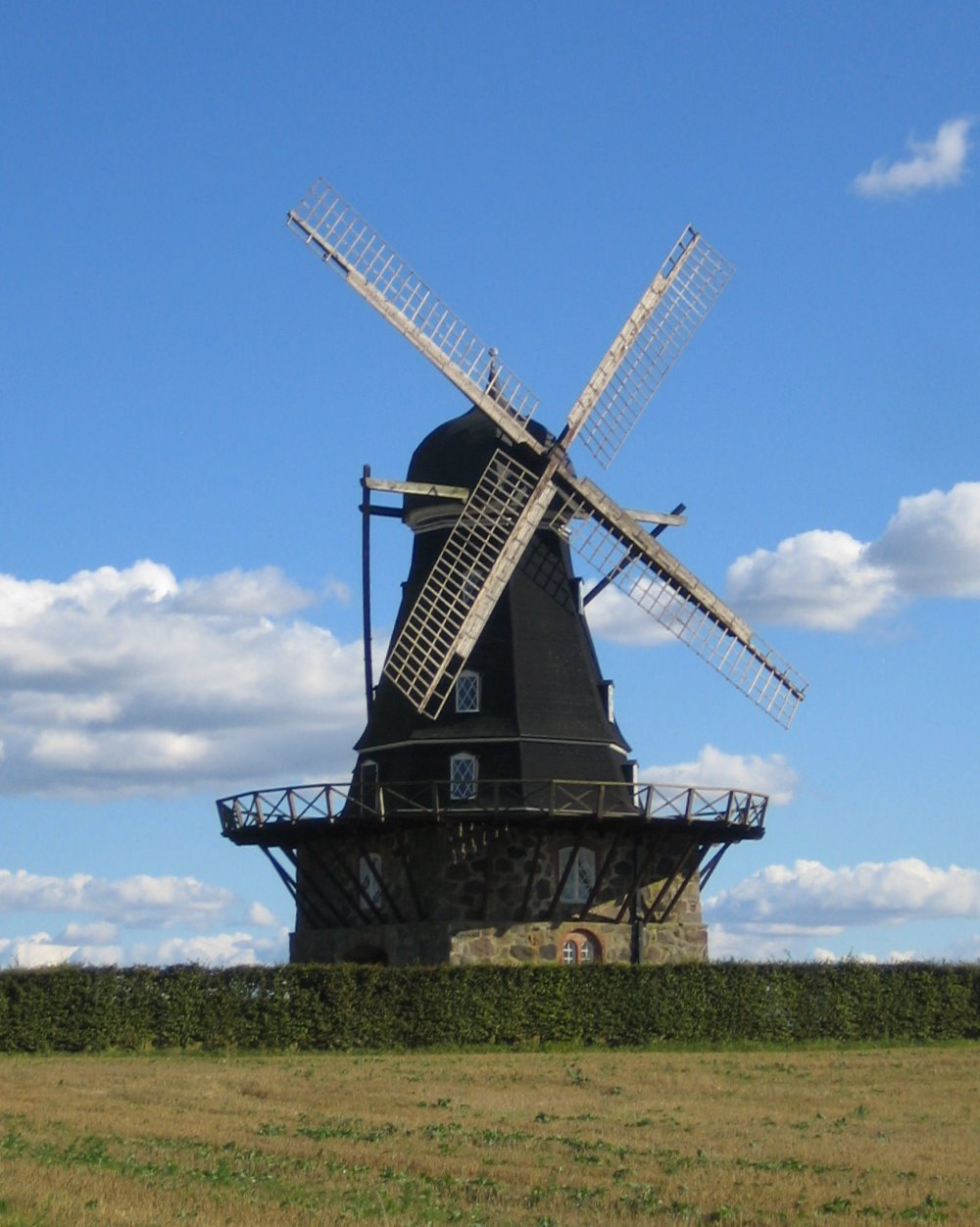
Windmill in Östraby
