= Freja Ryberg =

Finnish actress (1832–1920)

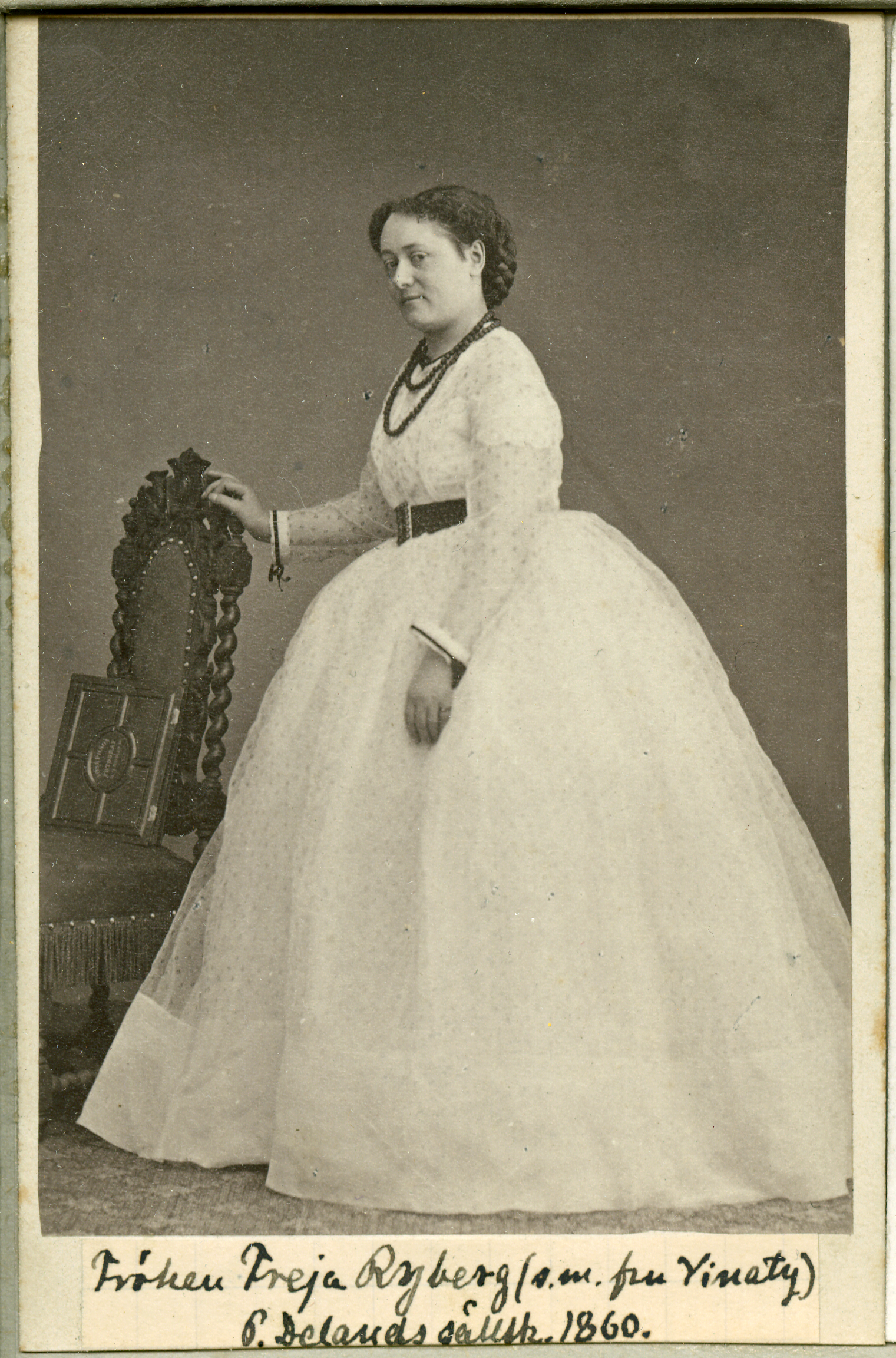
- Born: 5 October 1832; Ludvigsborg, Sweden
- Died: 1 July 1920 (aged 87); Paris, France
- Occupation: Stage actress
- Known for: Swedish Theatre
- Parents: Tuve Ludvig Ryberg (father); Cathrina Charlotta Kemner (mother)
- Relatives: Hulda Ryberg (sister)

Freja Ryberg (5 October 1832 in Ludvigsborg – 1 June 1920 in Paris), was a Finnish stage actress. She was a leading member of the first pioneer group of actors engaged at the foundation of the Swedish Theatre in Helsinki, the first permanent theatre in Finland, the first years after its foundation (1860–63).

== Life ==
Freja Ryberg was the daughter of land surveyor Tuve Ludvig Ryberg and Cathrina Charlotta Kemner and sister of the artist Hulda Ryberg. She was a student actor of the Royal Dramatic Theatre in 1852-53 and engaged in the theatre company of Edvard Stjernström. In 1860, she was engaged at the newly founded Swedish Theatre in Helsinki.

Alongside Fredrik Deland and Hjalmar Agardh, she was among the theatre's greatest attractions during the first years of its duration, the leading lady of the Finnish stage and frequently mentioned in the Finnish press. In 1863, however, the theatre burnt down and could not be rebuilt until three years later, and Ryberg left Finland. Freja Ryberg was long remembered in Finland, and the later famous Charlotte Raa-Winterhjelm was initially compared to her when she made her debut some years later.

Freja Ryberg married the French writer Alphonse Vinaty in 1866 and settled in Paris, where she died.
