= Dösjebro =

- Location within Skåne Location within Sweden
- Coordinates: 55°49′N 13°01′E
- Country: Sweden
- Province: Skåne
- County: Skåne County
- Municipality: Kävlinge Municipality

Area
  - Total: 0.57 km^{2} (0.22 sq mi)

Population (31 December 2010)
  - Total: 858
  - Density: 1,503/km^{2} (3,890/sq mi)
- Time zone: UTC+1 (CET)
  - Summer (DST): UTC+2 (CEST)

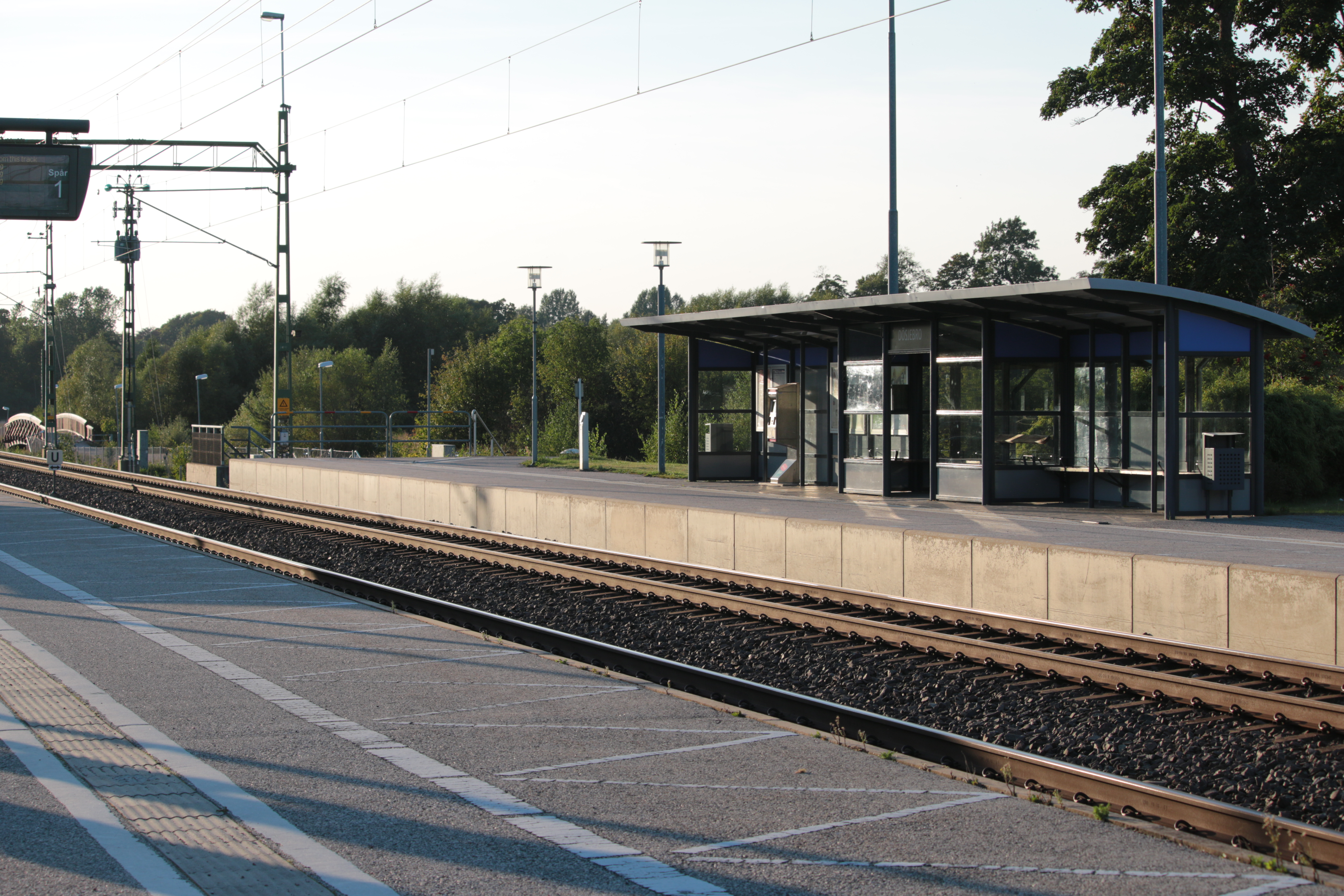
Dösjebro station

Dösjebro (Swedish pronunciation: [dœɧɛˈbruː]) is a locality situated in Kävlinge Municipality, Skåne County, Sweden with 858 inhabitants in 2010.
