= Kävlinge Municipality =

Kävlinge Municipality Kävlinge kommun
- Municipality
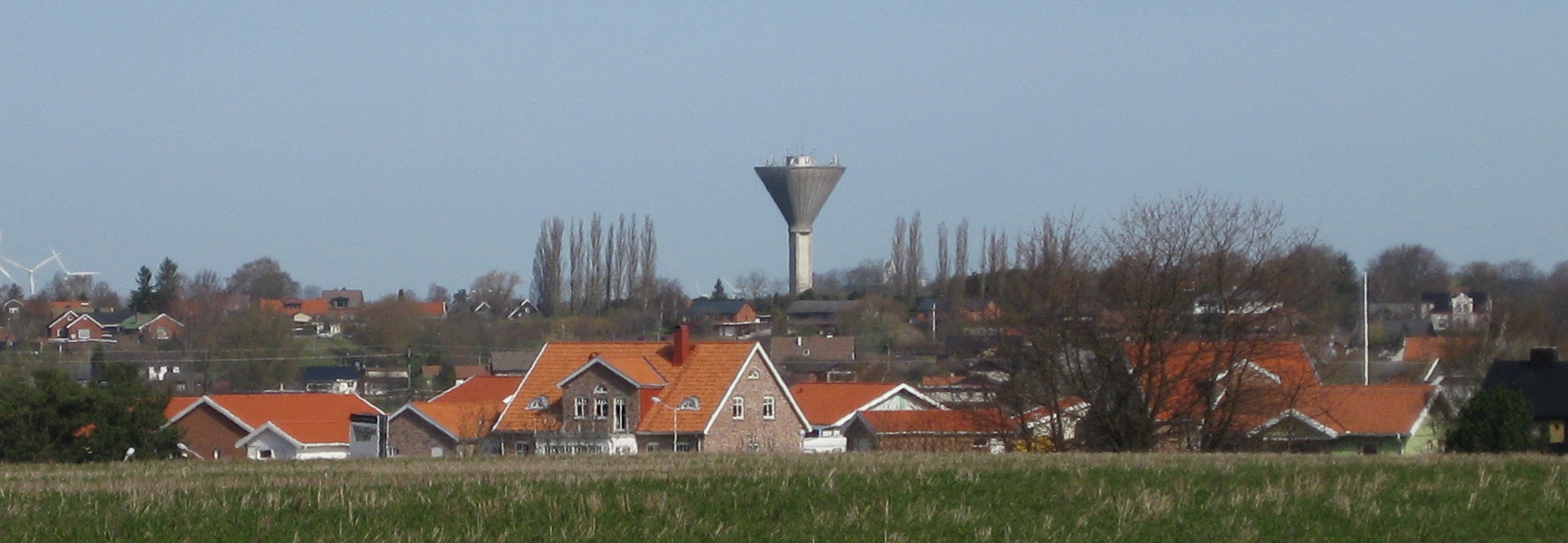

- Flag Coat of arms

- Coordinates: 55°48′N 13°07′E
- Country: Sweden
- County: Scania County
- Seat: Kävlinge

Area
  - Total: 292.45 km^{2} (112.92 sq mi)
  - Land: 152.56 km^{2} (58.90 sq mi)
  - Water: 139.89 km^{2} (54.01 sq mi)
- Area as of 1 January 2014.

Population (30 June 2025)
  - Total: 32,561
  - Density: 213.43/km^{2} (552.78/sq mi)
- Time zone: UTC+1 (CET)
  - Summer (DST): UTC+2 (CEST)
- ISO 3166 code: SE
- Province: Scania
- Municipal code: 1261
- Website: www.kavlinge.se

Kävlinge Municipality (Swedish: Kävlinge kommun) is a municipality in Scania County in southern Sweden. Its seat is located in the town of Kävlinge.

== Localities ==
There are nine urban areas (also called a Tätort or locality) in Kävlinge Municipality. In the table they are listed according to the size of the population as of December 31, 2005. The municipal seat is in bold characters.

#	Locality	Population
1	**Kävlinge**	10,500
2	Löddeköpinge	5,582
3	Furulund	3,888
4	Hofterup	3,243
5	Dösjebro	752
6	Sandskogen	533
7	Barsebäck	509
8	Barsebäckshamn	401
9	Lilla Harrie	321

Barsebäck was the location of a nuclear power plant, opened in the 1970s, but after decades of Danish protests - Copenhagen being located just across the Öresund Sound - it closed in 2005.

== Demographics ==
This is a demographic table based on Kävlinge Municipality's electoral districts in the 2022 Swedish general election sourced from SVT's election platform, in turn taken from SCB official statistics.

In total there were 32,305 inhabitants, including 23,627 Swedish citizens of voting age. 38.0% voted for the left coalition and 61.2% for the right coalition. Indicators are in percentage points except population totals and income.

Location	Residents	Citizen adults	Left vote	Right vote	Employed	Swedish parents	Foreign heritage	Income SEK	Degree
Location			%	%					
Barsebäck	2,249	1,656	32.5	67.2	87	91	9	36,686	65
Furulund C	1,690	1,204	42.6	55.7	78	79	21	25,095	42
Hofterup	2,410	1,773	28.9	70.7	85	90	10	33,689	57
Karaby/Dösjebro	1,812	1,353	36.6	62.9	88	90	10	31,311	50
Korsbacka/Arvidsborg	1,675	1,131	37.9	60.1	71	69	31	21,536	29
Kävlinge N	1,383	991	40.7	58.7	87	86	14	29,820	50
Kävlinge S	1,575	1,213	45.0	53.8	74	79	21	21,807	36
Kävlinge V	1,423	1,021	44.0	55.0	83	83	17	25,730	43
Kävlinge Ö	1,659	1,382	46.6	51.9	82	80	20	24,387	47
Lackalänga	1,539	1,071	45.8	53.2	87	90	10	30,541	53
Löddeköpinge C	1,601	1,181	39.8	58.9	84	87	13	26,619	50
Nyvång	1,797	1,335	38.7	60.8	87	88	12	31,412	56
Rinnebäck	1,991	1,406	44.8	54.2	86	84	16	27,831	43
Sandskogen/Lyckorna	1,818	1,394	32.7	66.9	89	88	12	31,037	48
Stora Harrie	1,757	1,301	36.9	61.9	88	88	12	31,585	49
Stävie	1,771	1,240	43.6	56.0	89	90	10	32,814	59
Tolvåker	2,175	1,513	35.2	64.3	86	88	12	29,604	46
Ålstorp	1,980	1,462	25.3	74.7	88	89	11	33,097	52
Source: SVT

== Elections ==
Below are the results since the 1973 municipal reform listed. Between 1988 and 1998 the Sweden Democrats' results were not published by the SCB due to the party's small size nationwide. "Turnout" denotes the percentage of the electorate casting a ballot, but "Votes" only applies to valid ballots cast.

=== Riksdag ===
Year	Turnout	Votes	V	S	MP	C	L	KD	M	SD	ND
1973	94.2	10,389	1.5	51.8	0.0	29.9	6.5	0.3	9.9	0.0	0.0
1976	95.0	12,470	1.6	48.4	0.0	23.9	10.5	0.2	15.3	0.0	0.0
1979	94.1	12,891	1.9	48.6	0.0	16.3	11.1	0.2	21.6	0.0	0.0
1982	94.2	13,187	2.0	49.6	1.6	14.6	5.5	0.4	26.2	0.0	0.0
1985	92.8	13,497	2.0	48.0	1.2	10.5	13.0	0.0	25.3	0.0	0.0
1988	88.9	13,441	2.9	48.3	5.2	10.2	10.9	0.7	20.8	0.0	0.0
1991	89.6	14,637	2.0	40.2	2.4	6.8	8.1	4.2	26.4	0.0	7.6
1994	89.9	15,284	2.3	50.6	3.2	5.5	5.8	2.0	26.7	0.0	1.5
1998	83.9	14,564	6.6	42.1	2.6	4.0	3.9	8.3	27.7	0.0	0.0
2002	83.2	15,224	4.1	43.0	2.6	4.2	13.8	6.3	18.1	6.0	0.0
2006	86.0	16,912	2.2	35.3	2.6	5.6	8.6	4.2	31.8	7.0	0.0
2010	87.7	18,422	2.1	25.4	4.7	5.3	8.6	3.6	40.0	9.1	0.0
2014	89.7	19,329	2.1	27.1	5.8	5.6	6.4	2.8	29.4	18.9	0.0

Blocs

This lists the relative strength of the socialist and centre-right blocs since 1973, but parties not elected to the Riksdag are inserted as "other", including the Sweden Democrats results from 1988 to 2006, but also the Christian Democrats pre-1991 and the Greens in 1982, 1985 and 1991. The sources are identical to the table above. The coalition or government mandate marked in bold formed the government after the election. New Democracy got elected in 1991 but are still listed as "other" due to the short lifespan of the party. "Elected" is the total number of percentage points from the municipality that went to parties who were elected to the Riksdag.

Year	Turnout	Votes	Left	Right	SD	Other	Elected
1973	94.2	10,389	**53.3**	46.3	0.0	0.4	99.6
1976	95.0	12,470	50.0	**49.7**	0.0	0.3	99.7
1979	94.1	12,891	50.5	**49.0**	0.0	0.5	99.5
1982	94.2	13,187	**51.6**	46.3	0.0	2.1	97.9
1985	92.8	13,497	**50.0**	48.8	0.0	1.2	98.8
1988	88.9	13,441	**56.4**	41.9	0.0	1.7	98.3
1991	89.6	14,637	42.2	**45.5**	0.0	12.3	95.3
1994	89.9	15,284	**56.1**	40.0	0.0	3.9	96.1
1998	83.9	14,564	**51.3**	43.9	0.0	4.8	95.2
2002	83.2	15,224	**49.9**	42.4	0.0	7.7	92.3
2006	86.0	16,912	40.1	**50.2**	0.0	9.7	90.3
2010	87.7	18,422	32.2	**57.5**	9.1	1.2	98.8
2014	89.7	19,329	**35.0**	44.2	18.9	1.9	98.1

== Twinnings ==
- Alatskivi Parish, Estonia
