= Barsebäckshamn =

Swedish locality

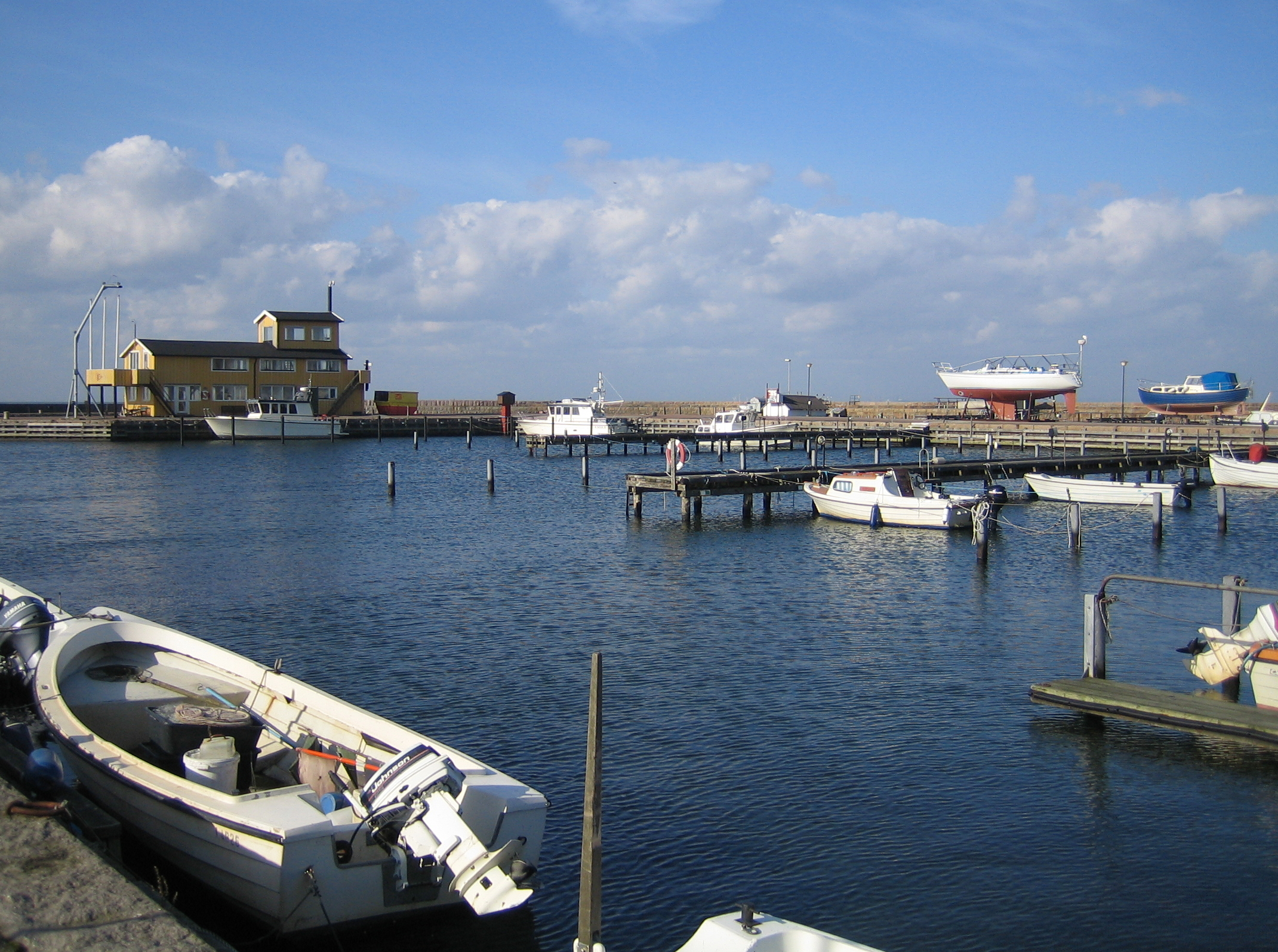
- The harbour in Barsebäckshamn

- Location within Skåne Location within Sweden
- Coordinates: 55°45′N 12°54′E
- Country: Sweden
- Province: Skåne
- County: Skåne County
- Municipality: Kävlinge Municipality

Area
  - Total: 0.38 km^{2} (0.15 sq mi)

Population (31 December 2010)
  - Total: 438
  - Density: 1,151/km^{2} (2,980/sq mi)
- Time zone: UTC+1 (CET)
  - Summer (DST): UTC+2 (CEST)

Barsebäckshamn is a locality situated in Kävlinge Municipality, Skåne County, Sweden with 438 inhabitants in 2010.
