= Hörby transmitter =

Transmitter station in Sweden

Coordinates: 55°48′22″N 13°43′16″E

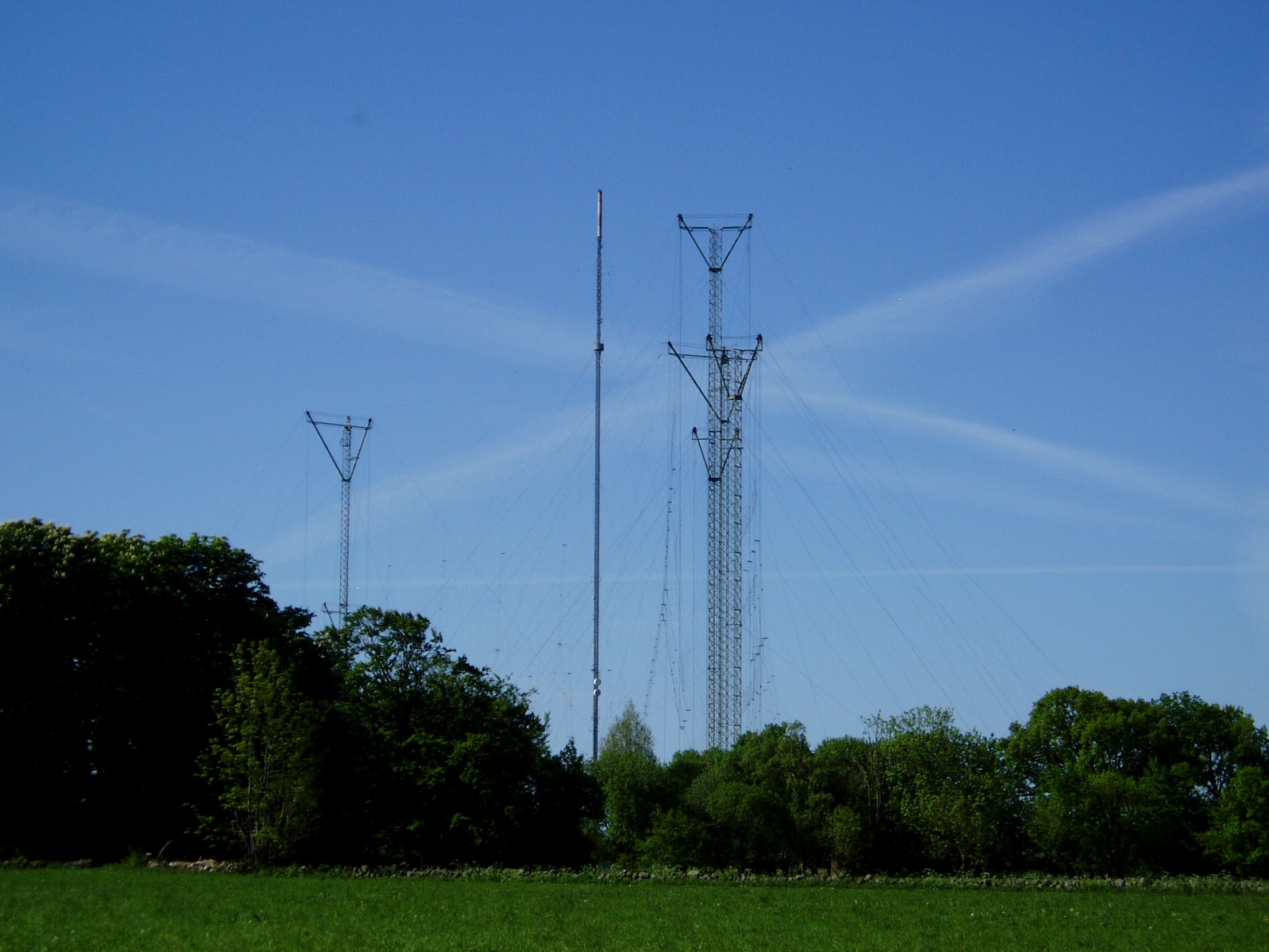
Hörby transmitter

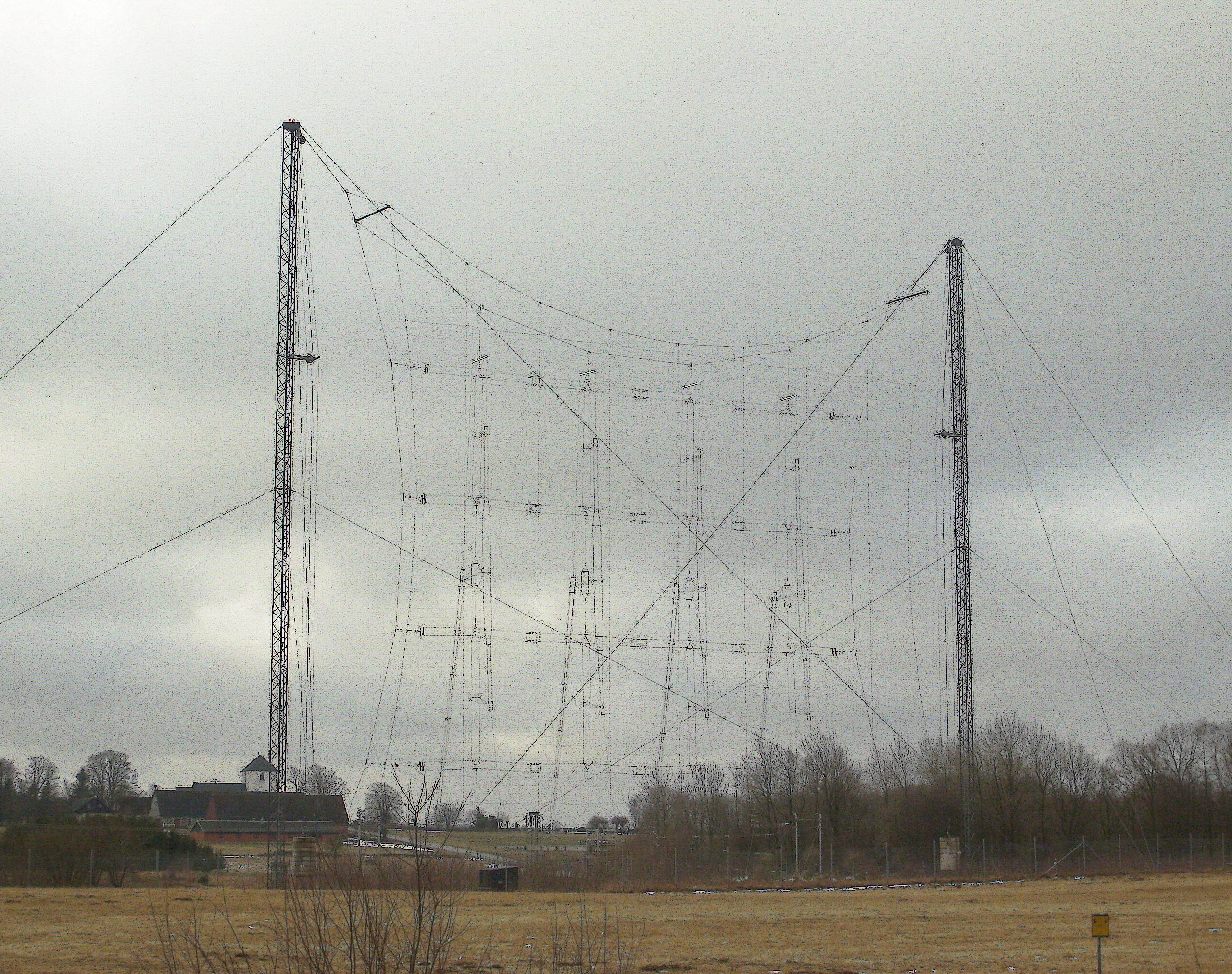
Historical Antenna G1, a curtain array, at Hörby shortwave station operated by Radio Sweden. It consists of 16 horizontal wire dipoles in a 4x4 array, suspended in front of a wire screen. Each of the 4 columns of dipoles is fed by a separate open-wire transmission line, which can be seen exiting at an angle from the center of each column. The diagonal wires in the foreground are guy wires. The CCIR designation for this type of antenna (below) is HR 4/4/0.5. Demolished on 2 April 2011.

The Hörby transmitter (Hörbymasten in Swedish) is a transmission centre located in Östra Sallerup, near Hörby in the southmost part of Sweden operated by national broadcaster Sveriges Radio. Due to its location in the middle of the province, it provides FM radio and television to most of Scania. It is 320 metres high and when opened in October 1959 it was one of the tallest structures in Europe.

It transmits the four national channels from Sveriges Radio: SR P1, SR P2, SR P3 and SR P4. Two versions of P4 are provided: SR Malmöhus and SR Kristianstad. The only remaining short wave radio transmissions also originated from outside Hörby, but were broadcast from the Hörby short wave transmitter.

The Hörby transmitter is among the last in Sweden to terminate its analogue signals. The analogue television channels carried by the transmitter were SVT1, SVT2 and TV4, all on UHF, which is unusual as SVT1 was usually broadcast on VHF. The analogue broadcasts of SVT2 and TV4 were closed down on October 15, 2007, with SVT1 continuing its broadcast for two more weeks.

The station has been broadcasting digital television (DVB-T) since 1999 and carries all seven national multiplexes.

On 2 April 2011 some short wave antennas have been blasted and dismantled. Among these the curtain antenna "G1".
