= Ludvigsborg =

- Location within Skåne Location within Sweden
- Coordinates: 55°54′N 13°36′E
- Country: Sweden
- Province: Skåne
- County: Skåne County
- Municipality: Hörby Municipality

Area
  - Total: 1.49 km^{2} (0.58 sq mi)

Population (31 December 2010)
  - Total: 1,041
  - Density: 699/km^{2} (1,810/sq mi)
- Time zone: UTC+1 (CET)
  - Summer (DST): UTC+2 (CEST)

Ludvigsborg is a locality situated in Hörby Municipality, Skåne County, Sweden with 1,041 inhabitants in 2010.
