= Östraby =

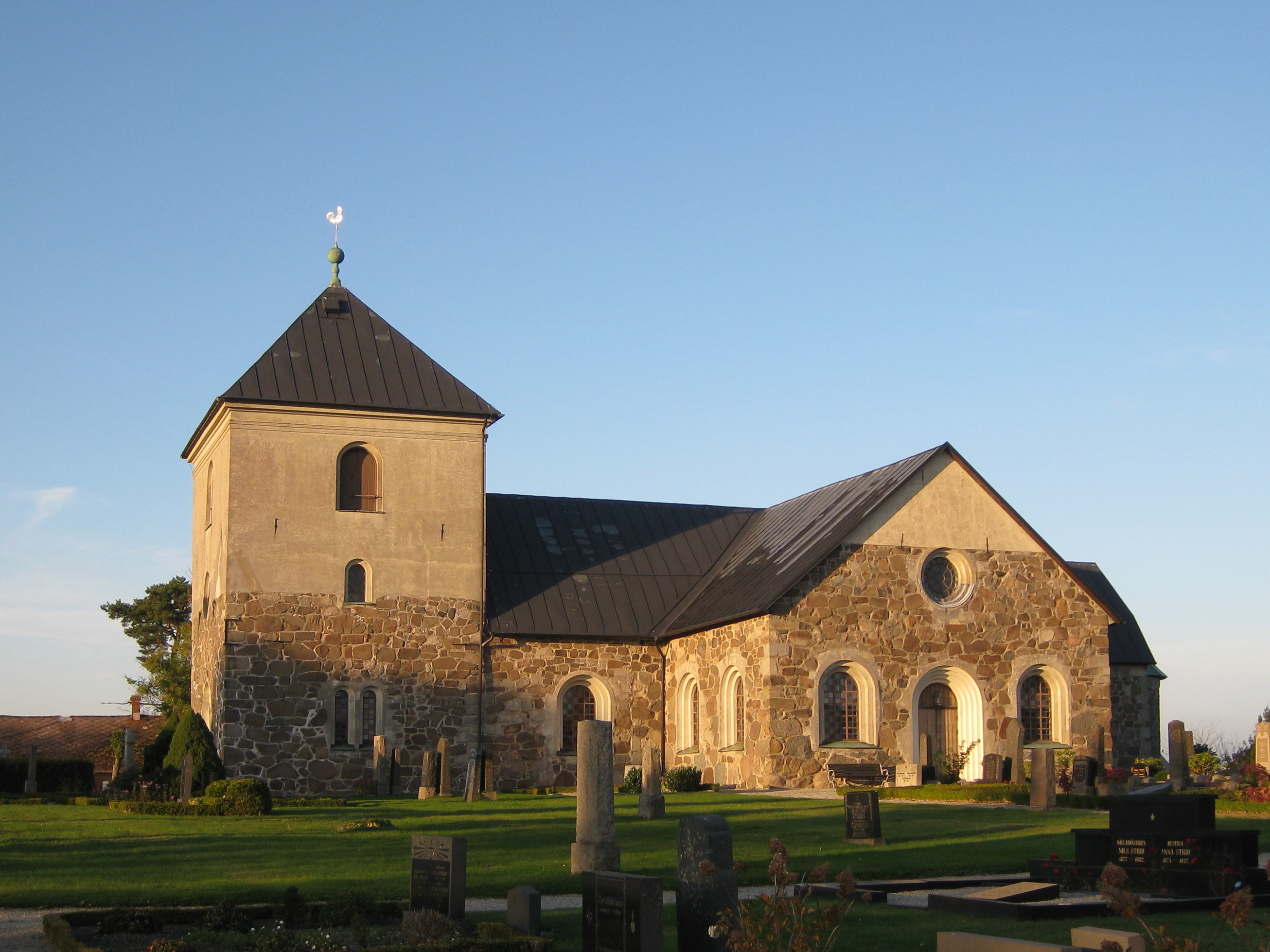
- Östraby Church

- Location within Skåne Location within Sweden
- Coordinates: 55°45′33″N 13°41′07″E
- Country: Sweden
- Province: Skåne
- County: Skåne County
- Municipality: Hörby Municipality

Area
  - Total: 0.27 km^{2} (0.10 sq mi)

Population (31 December 2010)
  - Total: 200
  - Density: 743/km^{2} (1,920/sq mi)
- Time zone: UTC+1 (CET)
  - Summer (DST): UTC+2 (CEST)

Östraby is a locality situated in Hörby Municipality, Skåne County, Sweden with 200 inhabitants in 2010.
