= Hofterup Church =

- Hofterups kyrka
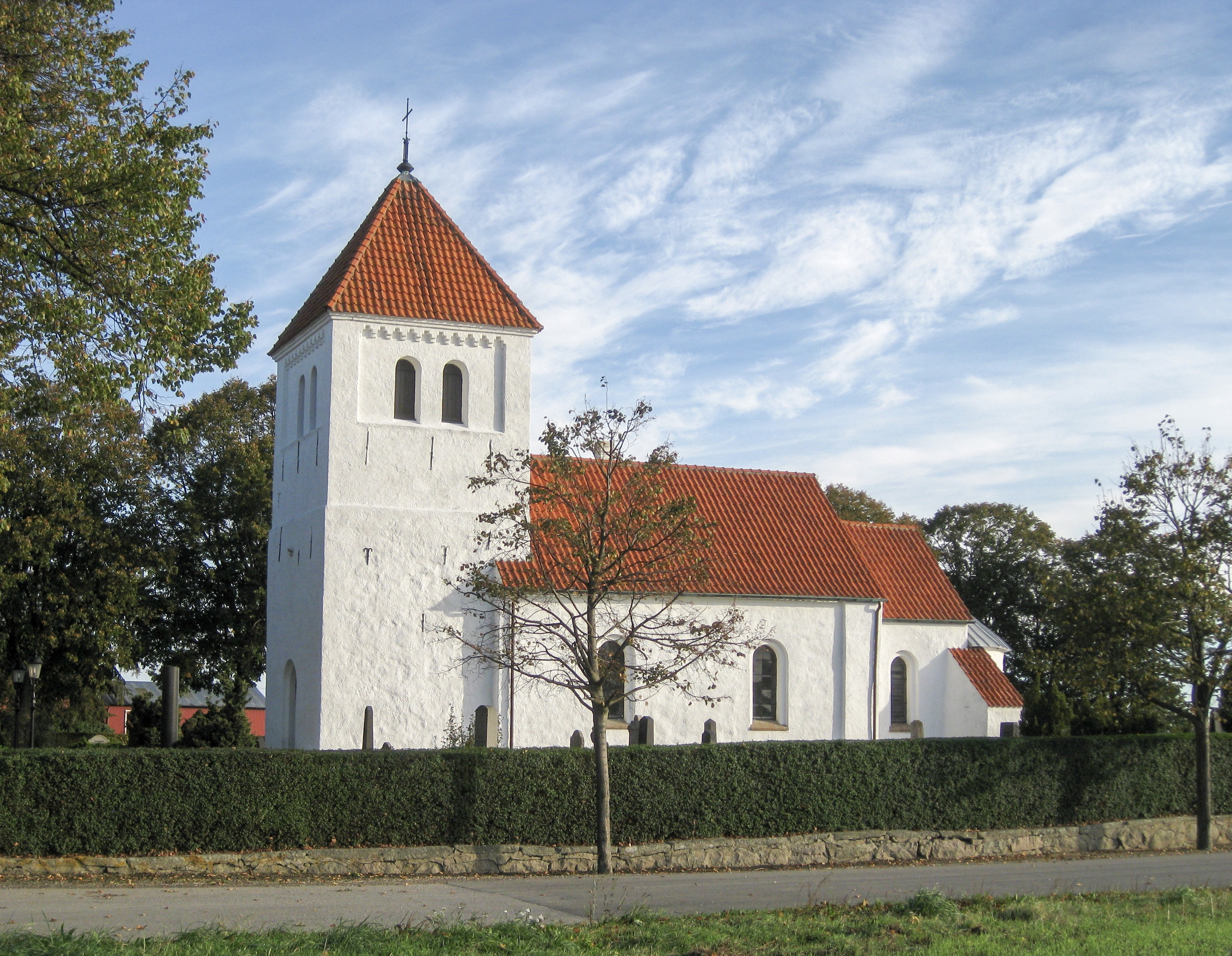
- Hofterup Church

- 55°47′03″N 12°58′34″E
- Country: Sweden
- Denomination: Church of Sweden

Hofterup Church (Swedish: Hofterups kyrka), medieval church in the province of Skåne, Sweden. It belongs to the Diocese of Lund. It is one of the oldest and most well-preserved Romanesque churches in Scandinavia.

== History and architecture ==
The church was built during the first quarter of the 11th century, originally consisting of an apse, choir and nave. Its design, with an apse almost as wide as the choir, suggest influences from England, probably conveyed via churches on Zealand and on Jutland. Original decorative details still remain, like the Romanesque semi-circular frieze on the apse and a sculpted plaque made of limestone from Saltholm immured above the entrance to the apse. The vaults of the choir and apse ceiling inside the church are also original. Furthermore, Hofterup Church contains preserved Romanesque murals on the walls of the choir and the apse; these date from the late 12th century. They were probably made by the same artist that made the murals of Finja Church in Hässleholm Municipality. Hofterup Church is the oldest and best-preserved church of its kind (built with an apse) in Skåne.

The vaults of the nave date from the 15th century and are decorated with late-Gothic murals. The tower was built during the 13th century and made taller in 1851. The northern transept was built in 1845. The furnishings of the church date from the time after the Reformation. The richly decorated altarpiece is from 1597 and contains the monogram of Christian IV of Denmark (as the province of Skåne didn't become part of Sweden before the Treaty of Roskilde in 1658), but the central oil painting (by Christian Holst) dates from 1754. The pulpit dates from 1751 and the Medievalist baptismal font is from 1890. The pews are from 1912 and designed by architect Theodor Wåhlin (1864-1948).
