= Saxån =

Coordinates: 55.84857°N 12.95853°E

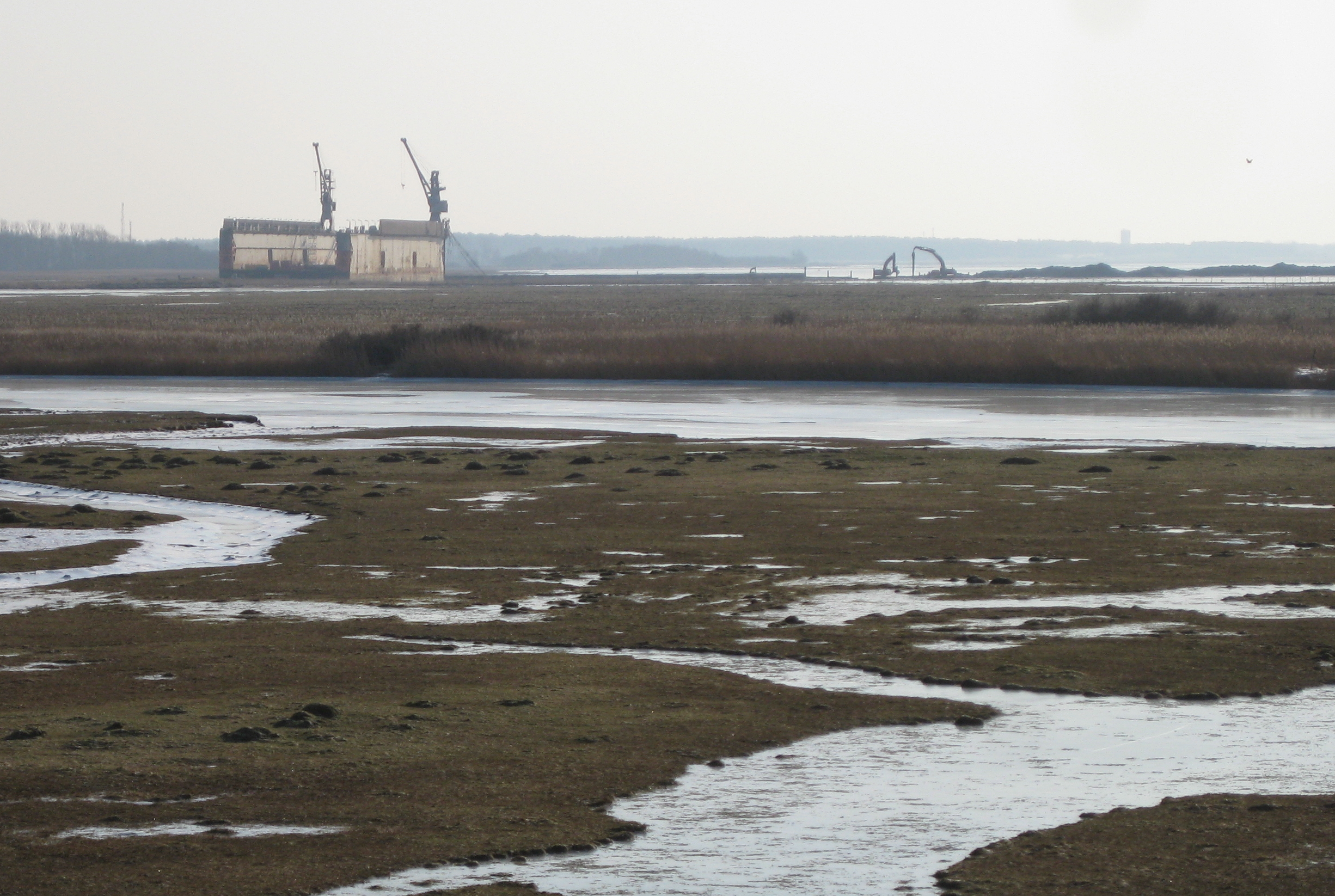

Location
- Country: Sweden
- County: Skåne

Physical characteristics
- Mouth: Lundåkrabukten in Öresund
- Length: 43 km (27 mi)
- Basin size: 359.9 km^{2} (139.0 sq mi)

Saxån is a river in Skåne County in Sweden.
