= Hofterup =

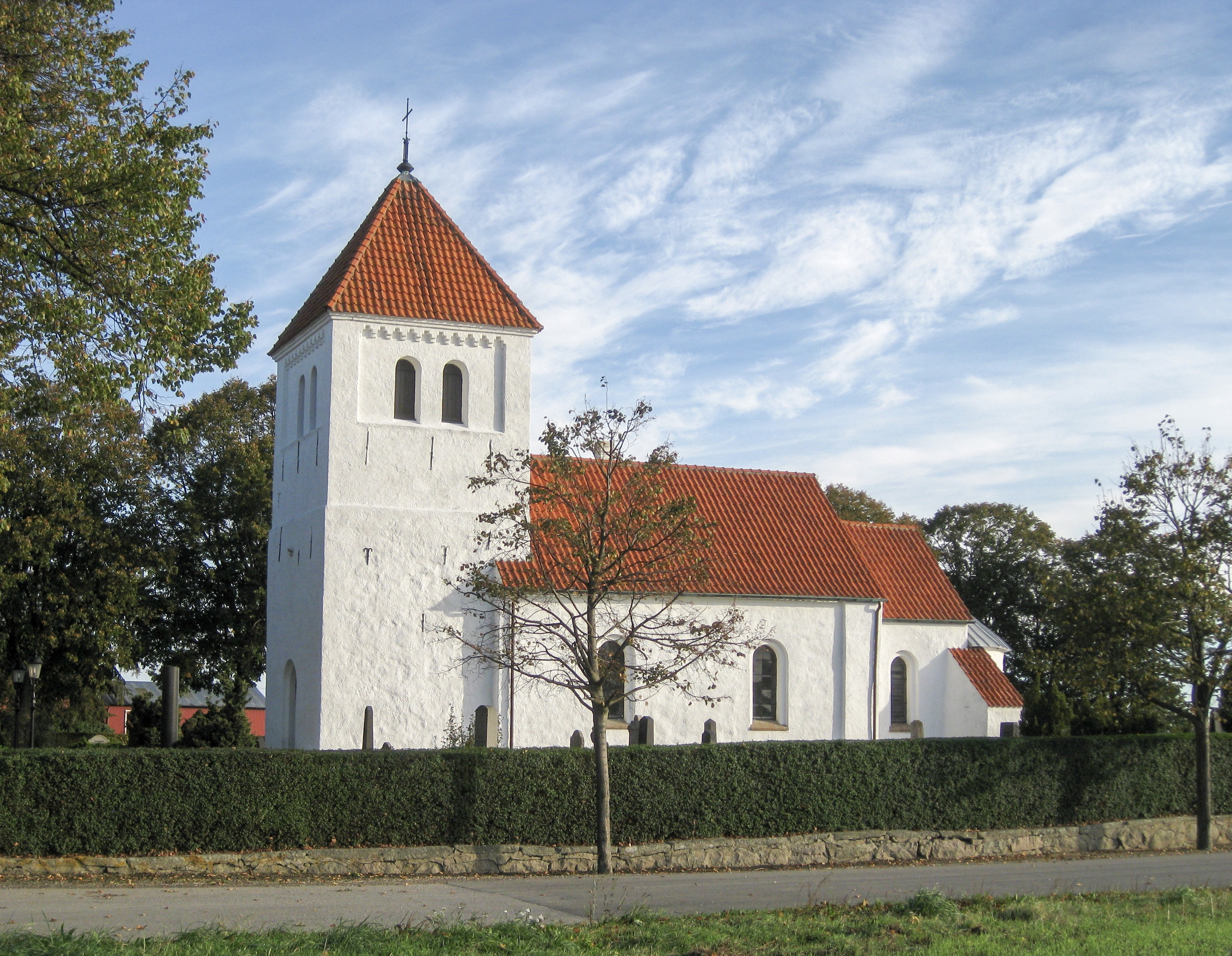
- Hofterup Church

- Location within Skåne Location within Sweden
- Coordinates: 55°47′N 12°58′E
- Country: Sweden
- Province: Skåne
- County: Skåne County
- Municipality: Kävlinge Municipality

Area
  - Total: 2.76 km^{2} (1.07 sq mi)

Population (31 December 2010)
  - Total: 3,501
  - Density: 1,268/km^{2} (3,280/sq mi)
- Time zone: UTC+1 (CET)
  - Summer (DST): UTC+2 (CEST)

Hofterup is a locality situated in Kävlinge Municipality, Skåne County, Sweden with 3,501 inhabitants in 2010.

The etymology of the name suggests it may originally have meant "the settlement of Horte", Horte being and old Scandinavian male name.

Among historical landmarks can be noted Hofterupsdösen, a stone chamber tomb from the Neolithic (Stone Age), and the well-preserved medieval Hofterup Church. Järavallen Nature Reserve, one of Skåne's largest public recreation areas, is in Hofterup. In Hofterup lies also Barsebäck Golf & Country Club - regarded as one of the top golf courses in Europe. The 2003 Solheim Cup was hosted here, as well as several Scandinavian Masters tournaments.
