= Hörby =

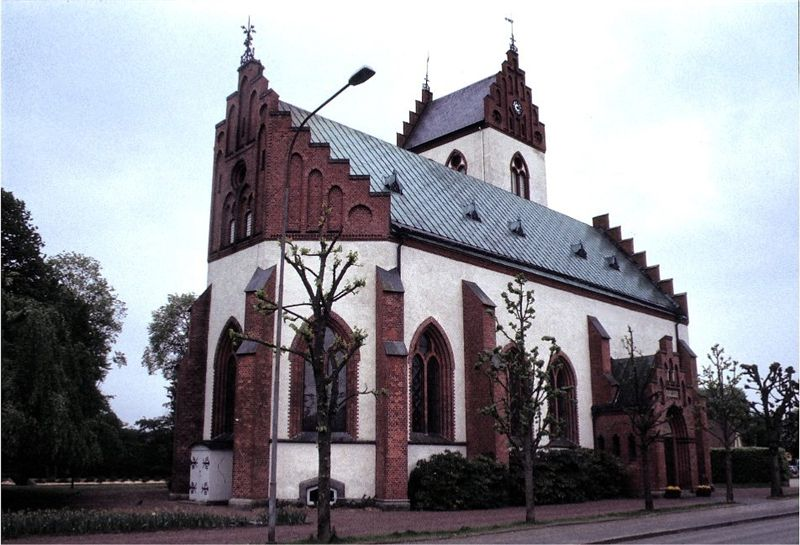
- Hörby Church

- Coat of arms

- Location within Skåne Location within Sweden
- Coordinates: 55°51′N 13°39′E
- Country: Sweden
- Province: Skåne
- County: Skåne County
- Municipality: Hörby Municipality

Area
  - Total: 4.23 km^{2} (1.63 sq mi)

Population (31 December 2010)
  - Total: 7,085
  - Density: 1,676/km^{2} (4,340/sq mi)
- Time zone: UTC+1 (CET)
  - Summer (DST): UTC+2 (CEST)

Hörby (Swedish pronunciation: [ˈhœ̂ːrbʏ]) is a locality and the seat of Hörby Municipality, Skåne County, Sweden with 15 631 inhabitants in 2019.

6 km (3.7 mi) south-east of the center of Hörby is at least since 1959 the location of a radio and TV transmitter. Short wave antennas have been dismantled there in 2011.

== Climate ==
Hörby has a transitional maritime-continental climate with moderate seasonal swings by Nordic inland standards. The weather station was opened in 1995 and thus cold records are limited, but nearby Stehag recorded −23 °C (−9 °F) in February 1979. With a January mean just below freezing, Hörby is as of 2021, the southernmost station in Sweden to average a meteorological winter under Nordic definitions of 0 °C (32 °F) means. Its inland and somewhat elevated location means higher levels of precipitation than in many surrounding areas, common to southern Sweden. As such, heavy snowfall sometimes occur during winter and the more frequent cloud cover in summer renders Hörby quite a bit milder than lower areas around Öresund and Österlen during the warm season.

Climate data for Hörby (2002–2021 averages, extremes since 1995; snow depth from Knopparp)
Month	Jan	Feb	Mar	Apr	May	Jun	Jul	Aug	Sep	Oct	Nov	Dec	Year
Record high °C (°F)	10.3 (50.5)	13.5 (56.3)	19.1 (66.4)	27.2 (81.0)	27.6 (81.7)	31.8 (89.2)	32.6 (90.7)	33.7 (92.7)	27.0 (80.6)	22.3 (72.1)	17.0 (62.6)	11.7 (53.1)	33.7 (92.7)
Mean maximum °C (°F)	7.4 (45.3)	8.1 (46.6)	13.8 (56.8)	19.5 (67.1)	24.1 (75.4)	27.0 (80.6)	28.8 (83.8)	27.9 (82.2)	23.5 (74.3)	17.4 (63.3)	12.0 (53.6)	8.3 (46.9)	30.0 (86.0)
Mean daily maximum °C (°F)	2.1 (35.8)	2.5 (36.5)	6.3 (43.3)	12.1 (53.8)	16.8 (62.2)	20.3 (68.5)	22.4 (72.3)	21.7 (71.1)	17.8 (64.0)	11.9 (53.4)	7.1 (44.8)	3.7 (38.7)	12.1 (53.7)
Daily mean °C (°F)	−0.1 (31.8)	0.2 (32.4)	2.8 (37.0)	7.3 (45.1)	11.8 (53.2)	15.4 (59.7)	17.7 (63.9)	17.2 (63.0)	13.8 (56.8)	8.8 (47.8)	5.0 (41.0)	1.7 (35.1)	8.5 (47.2)
Mean daily minimum °C (°F)	−2.3 (27.9)	−2.2 (28.0)	−0.8 (30.6)	2.5 (36.5)	6.8 (44.2)	10.5 (50.9)	12.9 (55.2)	12.7 (54.9)	9.7 (49.5)	5.6 (42.1)	2.8 (37.0)	−0.3 (31.5)	4.8 (40.7)
Mean minimum °C (°F)	−12.5 (9.5)	−10.3 (13.5)	−8.2 (17.2)	−3.6 (25.5)	−0.1 (31.8)	5.0 (41.0)	8.1 (46.6)	7.3 (45.1)	2.5 (36.5)	−2.5 (27.5)	−5.7 (21.7)	−8.9 (16.0)	−14.7 (5.5)
Record low °C (°F)	−20.3 (−4.5)	−16.3 (2.7)	−17.6 (0.3)	−8.8 (16.2)	−2.2 (28.0)	1.9 (35.4)	5.3 (41.5)	3.9 (39.0)	−1.1 (30.0)	−5.3 (22.5)	−11.4 (11.5)	−20.5 (−4.9)	−20.5 (−4.9)
Average precipitation mm (inches)	70.8 (2.79)	52.8 (2.08)	44.2 (1.74)	32.1 (1.26)	44.9 (1.77)	65.4 (2.57)	80.1 (3.15)	83.0 (3.27)	54.0 (2.13)	77.7 (3.06)	70.0 (2.76)	73.9 (2.91)	748.9 (29.49)
Average extreme snow depth cm (inches)	19 (7.5)	22 (8.7)	13 (5.1)	1 (0.4)	0 (0)	0 (0)	0 (0)	0 (0)	0 (0)	1 (0.4)	6 (2.4)	12 (4.7)	32 (13)
Source 1: SMHI Open Data for Hörby A, precipitation
Source 2: SMHI Open Data for Hörby A, temperature
