= Hulta =

Hulta may refer to:

- Hulta, Blekinge
- Hulta, Kronoberg
- Hulta, Jönköping
- Hulta, Kalmar
- Hulta, Östergötland
- Hulta, Örebro
- Hulta, Värmland
- Hulta, Västra Götaland
