= Hulta, Kalmar =

Settlement in Kalmar County, Sweden

Hulta
- Hulta's location in Kalmar County
- Coordinates: 58°01′43″N 16°33′59″E
- Country: Sweden
- Province: Småland
- County: Kalmar County
- Municipality: Västervik Municipality
- District: Västra Ed District
- Postal code: 590 98
- Postal town: Edsbruk
- Area code: 0493

Hulta is a settlement in Kalmar County, Sweden.

== Nearby settlements ==
Edsbruk – 5 km (3 miles) North
Vråka – 7 km (4.3 miles) Northeast
Gamleby – 20 km (12.4 miles) South
Överum – 22 km (13.6 miles) West
Västervik – 45 km (28 miles) South
