= Erik Reimhult =

Swedish artist (1915–1999)

Erik Reimhult was a Swedish sculptor (born 6 September 1915 in Hjorted Parish, Kalmar County, Sweden; died 20 September 1999 in Törnsfall Parish, Västervik Municipality, Kalmar County.

== Education ==
As a child, Reimhult made carvings of animals and men from his surroundings. From 1942 to 1945, he trained at Västervik Bildhuggarskola and then began his career as a sculptor. In 1957 he practiced with Bror Hjorth in Uppsala. His interest in animals and nature helped him to develop his special technique of saw shaping animal sculptures of wood. The saw tool provides a harshness that adds to the character of the sculptures.

== Exhibitions ==
Erik Reimhult participated in many exhibitions with other artists, particularly in the province of Småland. He had solo exhibitions in Karlskrona, Uddevalla, Linköping, Mariestad, Kalmar Art Museum, Växjö, Museum of Natural History in Stockholm, "Animals in Sculpture", and Forest Museum in Gävle. In 1976 he participated in "Sculpture in the Park" and "Animals in nature" in Kalmar Art Museum, the Konstgården Gallery in Tranås, and a retrospective exhibition at Kulturhuset in Västervik. In 1992 he participated in exhibitions in Kalmar, Växjö, Värnamo, Eksjö, Vimmerby and Liljevalchs konsthall in Stockholm.

== Awards ==
- Kalmar County Cultural 1971
- Västerviks-Tidningen Cultural 1988
- Västervik Municipality Cultural 1991
- Diploma from Kalmar County antiquities and heritage society 1990
