= Gunnebo (disambiguation) =

Gunnebo may refer to:

- Gunnebo, a Swedish town
- Gunnebo House, a château in Sweden
- Gunnebo Group, a multinational corporation
