= Leif Svanström =

Swedish epidemiologist (1943–2023)

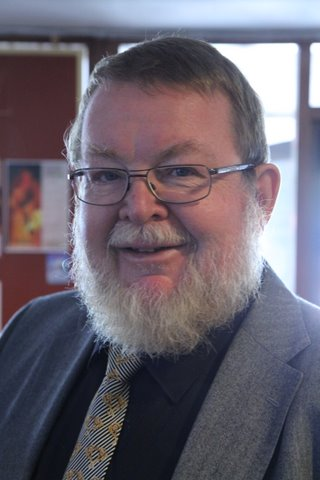
- Born: 30 October 1943; Gamleby, Västervik, Sweden
- Died: January 29, 2023 (aged 79); Sweden
- Spouse: Kerstin
- Children: 4

Academic background
- Education: Lund University

Academic work
- Discipline: Social medicine
- Institutions: Karolinska Institute

Leif Svanström (30 October 1943 – 29 January 2023) was a Swedish physician and researcher in the field of social medicine. He organized the first World Conference on Accident and Injury Prevention. He led initiatives at the Karolinska Institute in association with the World Health Organization (WHO) to develop and implement Safe Communities programs.

== Early life and education ==
He was born 30 October 1943 in Gamleby in the Västervik Municipality of Sweden. He earned his BA and MD from Lund University in 1966 and 1972, respectively. His PhD was completed in 1972.

== Career ==
He became a professor at the Karolinska Institute in 1980.

Svanström worked with Bo Haglund to develop the so-called rainbow model of health determinants, which was published 1983 in a Swedish medical textbook. The model was translated into English and became more commonly known as the Dahlgren-Whitehead model. In 2015, the UK Economic and Social Science Research Council cited it as one of the 50 key social science achievements of the past 50 years.

In 1989, Svanström organized the first World Conference on Accident and Injury Prevention in Stockholm. During the conference, a safe communities approach was outlined in reaction to a pilot Safe Community program in Falköping which had succeeded in reducing injury rates by 23%. It was adopted in other countries including Norway, Denmark, France, and Canada. Svanström was chair of the WHO's Collaborating Center on Community Safety Promotion, and founded its associated international network of safe communities. He also led the group's certifying center until 2017.

In 1990, he was invited as an expert by the Plunket Society of New Zealand to present a community program for prevention of childhood accidents.

== Awards and honors ==
In 1998, he received the International Distinguished Career Award from the American Public Health Association, in recognition of his work with injury prevention and emergency health services.

In 2010, he was made a professor emeritus in social medicine at the Karolinska Institute.

== Personal life ==
He and his wife Kerstin had four children.
