= Almvik =

- Location within Kalmar Location within Sweden
- Coordinates: 57°50′N 16°28′E
- Country: Sweden
- Province: Småland
- County: Kalmar County
- Municipality: Västervik Municipality

Area
  - Total: 0.21 km^{2} (0.081 sq mi)

Population (2005-12-31)
  - Total: 202
  - Density: 954/km^{2} (2,470/sq mi)
- Time zone: UTC+1 (CET)
  - Summer (DST): UTC+2 (CEST)

Almvik is a village situated in Västervik Municipality, Kalmar County, Sweden with 202 inhabitants in 2005.
