= Loftahammar =

- Location within Kalmar Location within Sweden
- Coordinates: 57°54′N 16°42′E
- Country: Sweden
- Province: Småland
- County: Kalmar County
- Municipality: Västervik Municipality

Area
  - Total: 0.86 km^{2} (0.33 sq mi)

Population (31 December 2010)
  - Total: 404
  - Density: 472/km^{2} (1,220/sq mi)
- Time zone: UTC+1 (CET)
  - Summer (DST): UTC+2 (CEST)
- Website: www.loftahammar.com

Loftahammar (Swedish pronunciation: [lɔftaˈhâmːar]) is a locality situated in Västervik Municipality, Kalmar County, Sweden with 404 inhabitants in 2010.
