= Piperskärr =

- Location within Kalmar Location within Sweden
- Coordinates: 57°47′N 16°38′E
- Country: Sweden
- Province: Småland
- County: Kalmar County
- Municipality: Västervik Municipality

Area
  - Total: 0.63 km^{2} (0.24 sq mi)

Population (31 December 2010)
  - Total: 551
  - Density: 869/km^{2} (2,250/sq mi)
- Time zone: UTC+1 (CET)
  - Summer (DST): UTC+2 (CEST)

Piperskärr is a locality situated in Västervik Municipality, Kalmar County, Sweden with 551 inhabitants as of 2010.
