= Casimirsborg =

Country house in Småland, Sweden

Coordinates: 57°52′40″N 16°26′3″E

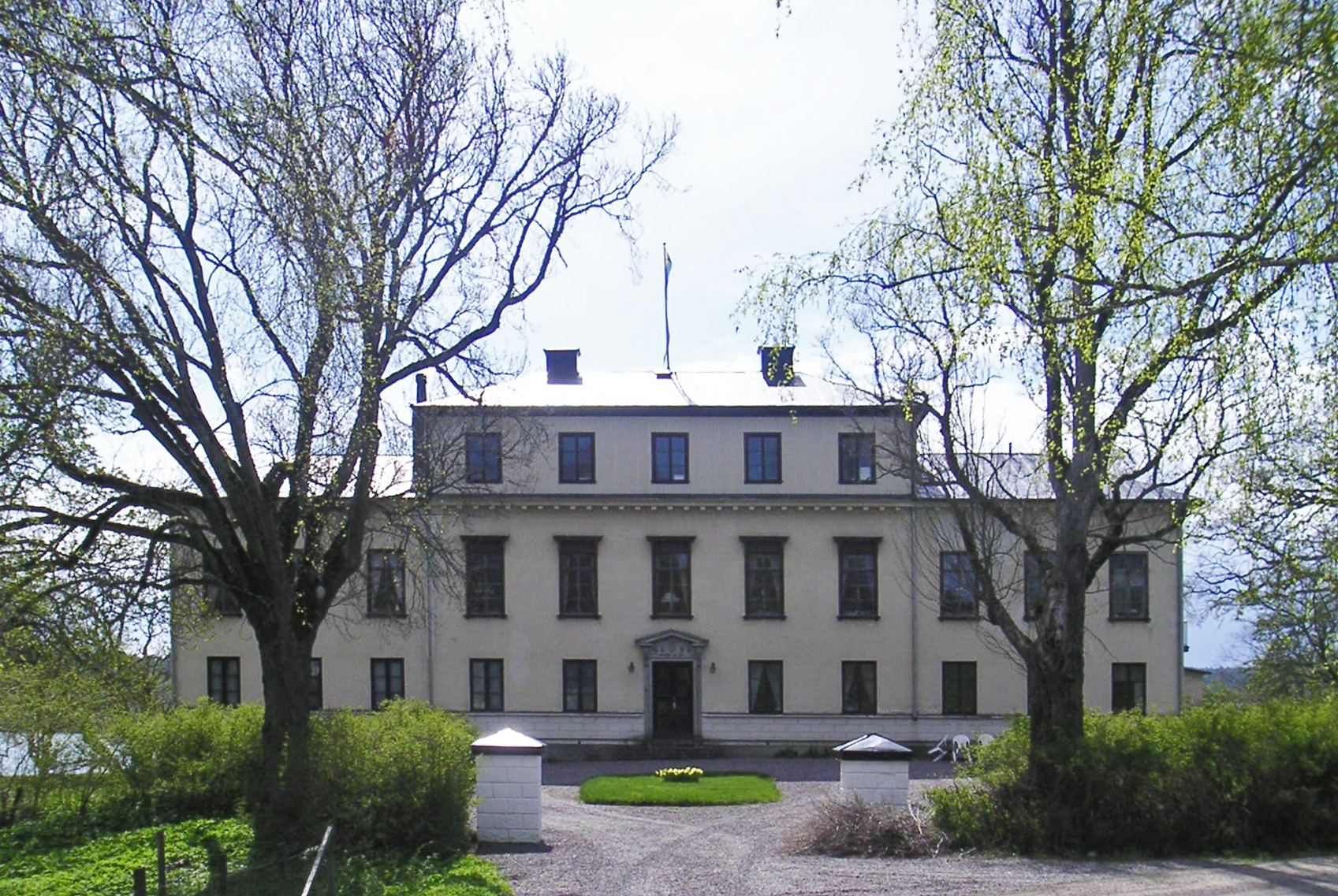
Casimirsborg, 2006. Photo by Björn Becker.

Casimirsborg is a country house just south of Gamleby, Småland, Sweden. It is situated on Gamlebyviken lake and was built in 1829 in the so-called neoclassical Tjust empire style, after the original 17th-century mansion was destroyed by fire.

== Early history ==
During the Middle Ages, the site of the present mansion was close to a village named Mæm (as spelled in 1379). The village consisted of two farms, and is first mentioned in 1379 when an Olof of Mem is mentioned as a witness to a land sale at the district court. The following year 1380, Tyrgils Geme, freeman in Västervik, and his wife Catherine sold a small parcel of land in the village to Bo Johnsson Grip (a seneschal), who bought more land in the village in 1383 and named the entire estate Vinäs.

In the early 17th century Mem was owned by Sidonia Grip (1585–1652) who on October 6, 1616, married her cousin Count Johan Casimir Lewenhaupt (1583–1634). The latter combined all the farms in the North Country into a unified estate and received manor privileges in 1618. He built a mansion with two wings and renamed the manor for himself, Casimirsborg.

The present day estate consists of consists of 13 houses, farmland and forestry.

== The mansion ==
In 1809, the seventeenth century mansion was destroyed by fire; twenty years later, in 1829, its owners, Count Gustaf Lewenhaupt and his wife Sophie, commissioned architect Uppman and builder Jonas Jonsson to rebuild the house in the then fashionable neoclassical Empire style. Like its predecessor, the new house was built on the foundations of the previous mansion; thus, the cellars date from the 14th century and still contain a dungeon from the first castle on the site dungeon. These cellars are all that remain of the previous buildings.

The house consists of a central block of three floors, flanked by two wings of three floors. It contains informal, low-ceilinged family living accommodation on the ground floor, and a high-ceilinged piano nobile above. The piano nobile contains the grandest and most formal rooms; these include six bedrooms and the principle reception room, the Grand salon, which is believed to be northern Småland's largest room in a private house (about 100 m^{2}). Adjoining the Grand Salon is a chapel designed in the Gothic revival style; this is one of the earliest examples of Gothic revival in Sweden, and was inspired by the Gothic Room at the Royal Palace in Stockholm. The chapel is decorated with trompe-l'œil, and has not been altered since its completion in 1829.

During the late 19th century, the house was mentioned in various travel guides as a destination worth visiting.

After Countess Lewenhaupt's death, in 1850, the estate passed from the Lewenhaupt family. Today, it is owned by Björn Becker and his wife Louise Klingspor. The house is not generally open to the public, but private tours, and occasional function hire are possible.
