= Tjust IF BF =

Tjust Bandy
- City: Gamleby, Sweden
- League: Division 1
- Division: Södra
- Founded: 2007; 18 years ago
- Home arena: Tjustvallen
- Head coach: Thomas Fransson
- Website: www.tjustbandy.se/

Tjust Bandy is a sports club in Gamleby, Sweden. The team colours are red and black. The club was founded in 2007.

The club was playing in Allsvenskan, the second level bandy league in Sweden, until 2009 when it was relegated to Division 1. It was playing in Allsvenskan in the season of 2013/14 too but was relegated again for the 2014/15 season.
