= Hjorted =

- Location within Kalmar Location within Sweden
- Coordinates: 57°38′N 16°18′E
- Country: Sweden
- Province: Småland
- County: Kalmar County
- Municipality: Västervik Municipality

Area
  - Total: 0.60 km^{2} (0.23 sq mi)

Population (31 December 2010)
  - Total: 324
  - Density: 540/km^{2} (1,400/sq mi)
- Time zone: UTC+1 (CET)
  - Summer (DST): UTC+2 (CEST)

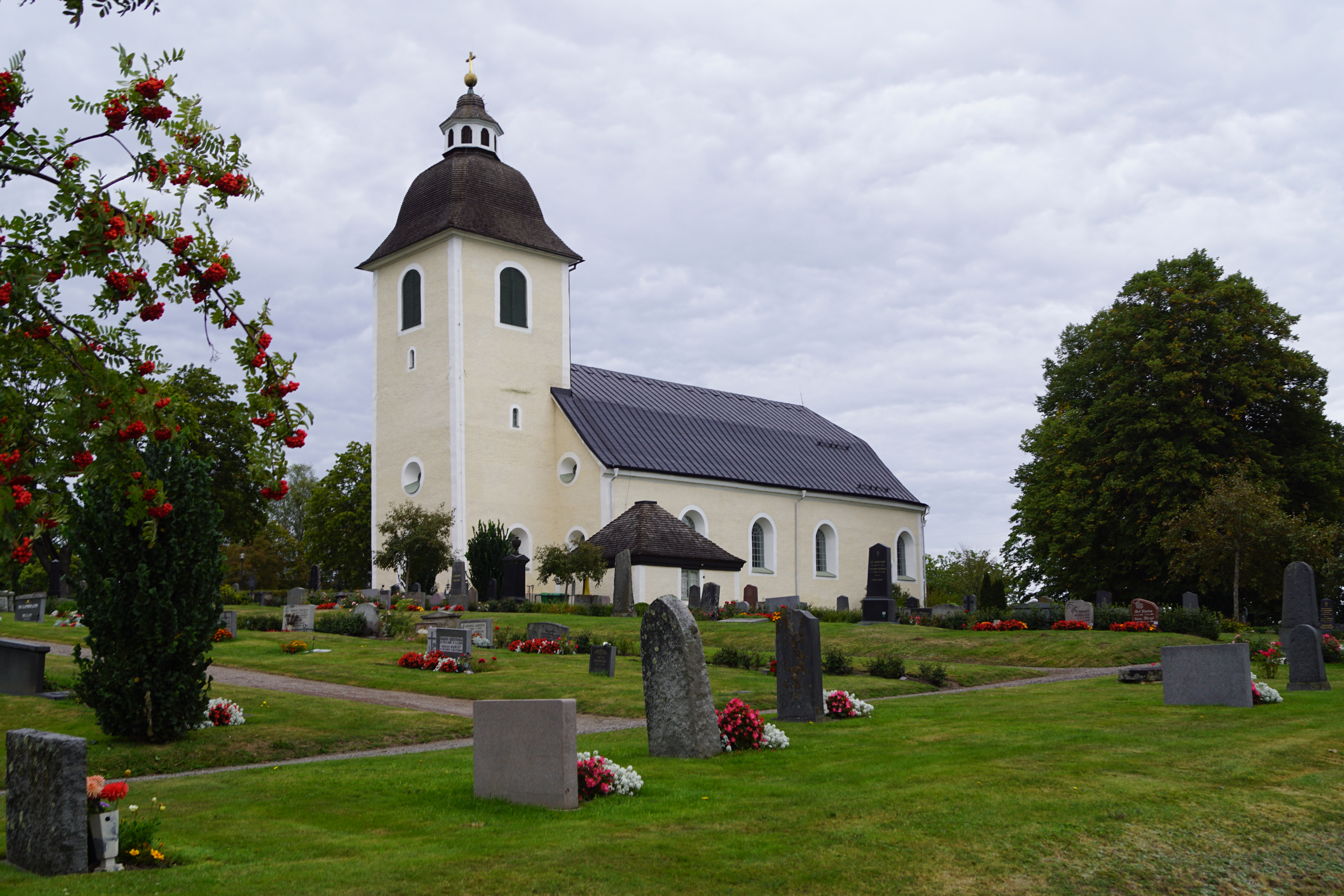
The church of the socken of Hjorted in Västervik Municipality, Sweden

Hjorted is a locality situated in Västervik Municipality, Kalmar County, Sweden, with 324 inhabitants in 2010.

== Notable people ==
- Erik Reimhult (1915–1999), sculptor
