= Gamleby =

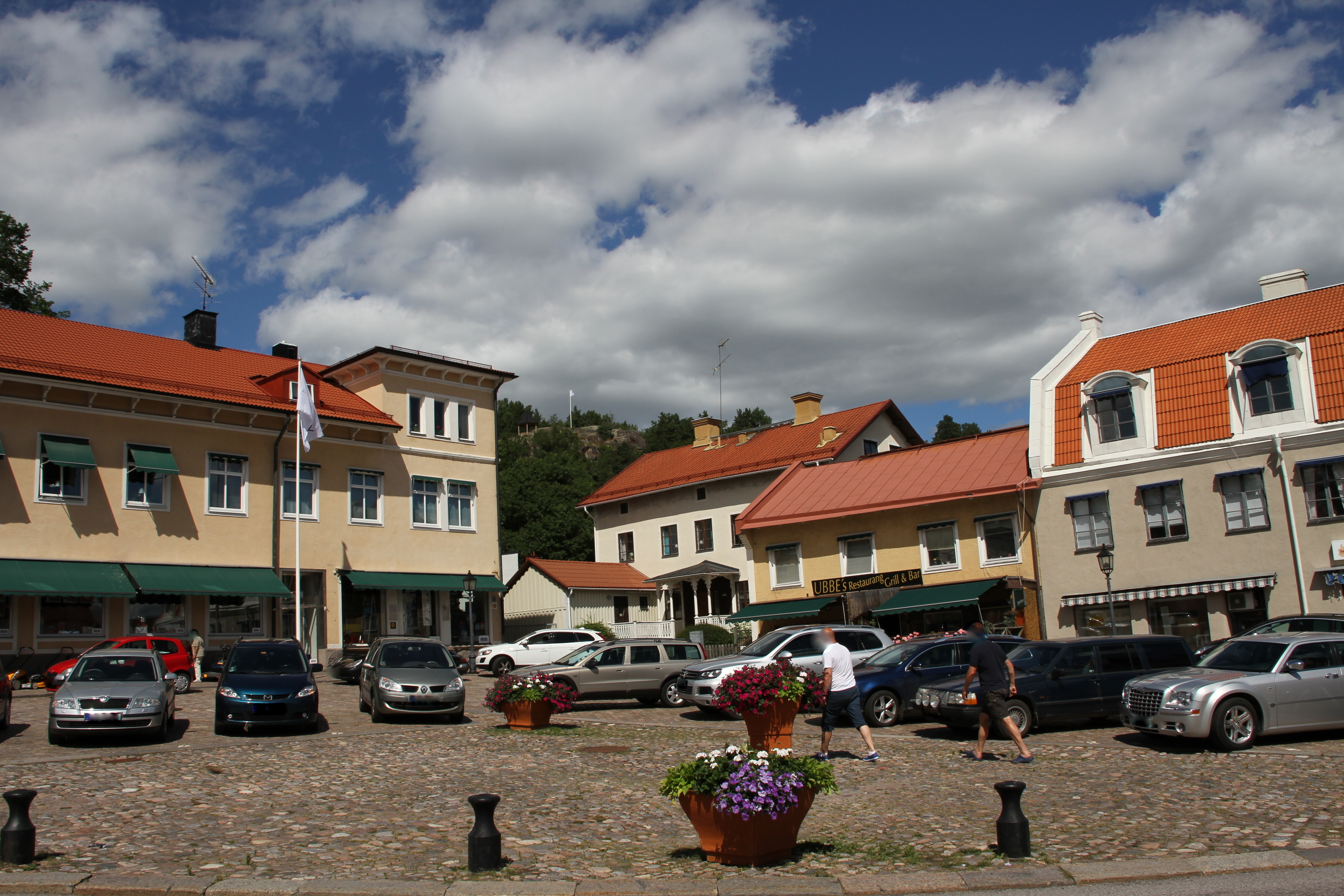

- Location within Kalmar Location within Sweden
- Coordinates: 57°53′N 16°23′E
- Country: Sweden
- Province: Småland
- County: Kalmar County
- Municipality: Västervik Municipality

Area
  - Total: 3.18 km^{2} (1.23 sq mi)

Population (31 December 2010)
  - Total: 2,775
  - Density: 873/km^{2} (2,260/sq mi)
- Time zone: UTC+1 (CET)
  - Summer (DST): UTC+2 (CEST)

Gamleby is the second largest locality situated in Västervik Municipality, Kalmar County, Sweden with 2,775 inhabitants in 2010. It is situated about 20 km north-west of Västervik, in the area known as Tjust.

Gamleby (which means "old village") was the original location of the town Västervik, first mentioned in 1275 (as Västervik). In 1433 Västervik moved to its present place, but a small settlement remained here.

The bandy and football club Tjust IF has its home in Gamleby.

== History ==
The name Gamleby means "the old town" and refers to the fact that the town is located in the place where Västervik's city was originally located, until 1433. The name Västervik was mentioned in 1275. The place had the north-eastern Småland's leading port, until the move of the city when Västervik was considered to have a better placed harbor than this town which is located at the end of Gamlebyviken about 25 km to the northwest. The place was named after the move in 1433 Gamla Västervik, later Gamleby and is written 1456 Gamblaby.

The whole of Gamleby is located on land that originally belonged to Åby manor. This farm, which belongs to the very oldest settlement, was originally called Gammelgård and was a royal farm.

Only in the 19th century did the town begin to grow again when the railway (today called Tjustbanan) ran through the community and contributed to the growth of industries and workshops and as a central location for the surrounding countryside in Tjust. In 1963, Svenska Färgfabriken opened a paint factory in the community which became one of the community's largest employers (Akzo Nobel) until it closed in 2016. Gamleby Folkhögskola was established at the end of the 19th century in Åby manor. After that, the locality had a period of growth that lasted until about 1975, when a population peak of about 3,700 inhabitants was reached.

Other industries have also been central to the town's development, e.g. a board farm owned by the wholesaler Henrik Cornelius and a quarry that lay along Marstrandsberget, on the other side of Gamlebyviken seen from the town. The board farm, which in its heyday was the village's largest workplace, burned down in a big fire in 1920. Miraculously, however, the rest of Gamleby could be saved.

== Society ==
Gamleby Torg, below Garpedansberget, is one of Scandinavia's few triangular squares. A few hundred meters west of Gamleby's old town center is Gamleby shopping center, inaugurated in 1972. Examples of shops in Gamleby Shopping Center are ICA, electricity store, clothing store, pizzeria, pharmacy, kiosk, Systembolaget and restaurant. Bank and ATM are also available. In the southern outskirts of the community, Hammarsbadet is about 25 minutes walk from Gamleby shopping center which is child-friendly with docks and jumping tower of five and ten meters, beach volleyball, playground and a barbecue area. There is also a mini golf course, kiosk with snack bar and restaurant.

=== Schools ===
- Ernebergsskolan
- Gamleby Folkhögskola
  - Gamleby Fotoskola
  - Old town TV production
  - Visskolan (formerly Visskolan in Västervik)
- Gamlebygymnasiet (formerly Valstadskolan)
- Hammargymnasiet
- Gamlebyviken's friskola
- Åbyängskolan
- Östra Ringskolan

== Notable people from Gamleby ==
- Daniel Hallingström (born 1981), football player and coach
- Conny Torstensson (born 1949), football player
- Tore Holm (1896 – 1977), boat designer, sailor and Olympic gold medalist
- Leif Svanström (1943 – 2023), physician and professor of social medicine

== Image gallery ==
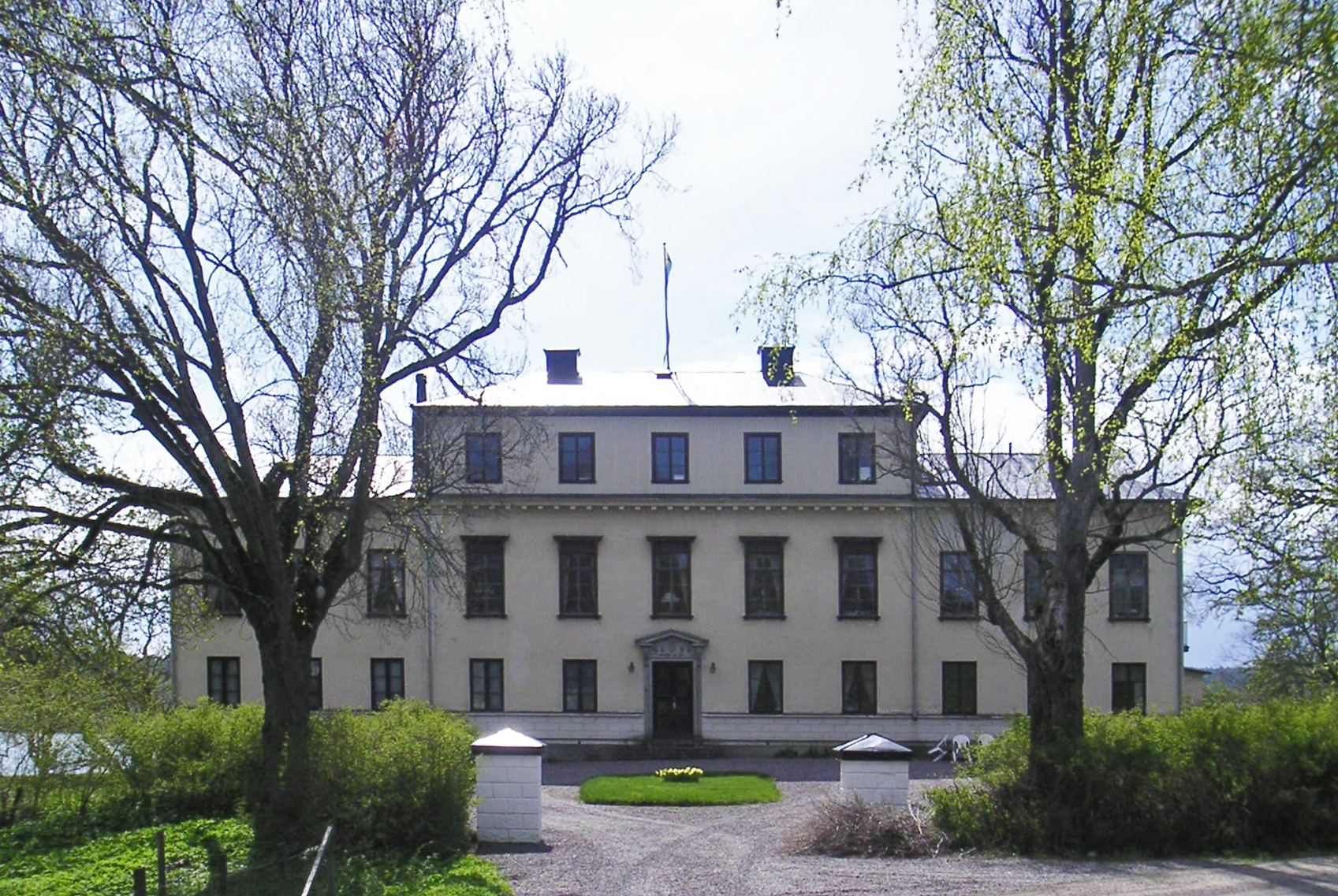
Casimirsborg, a 19th century country house just south of Gamleby

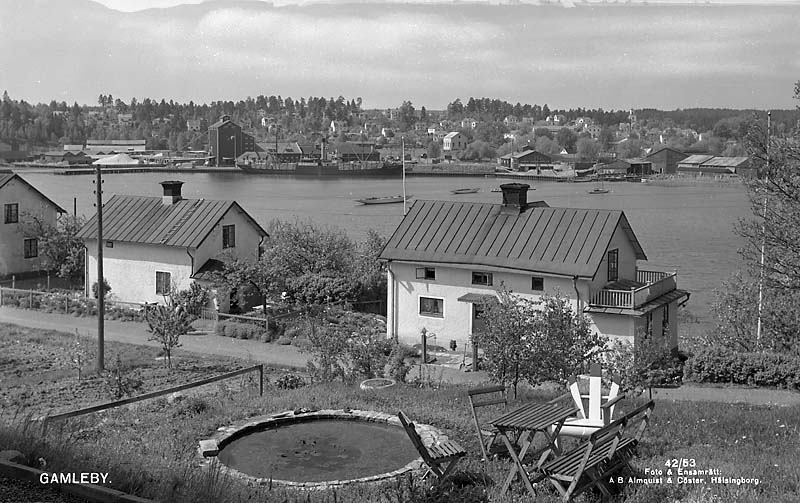

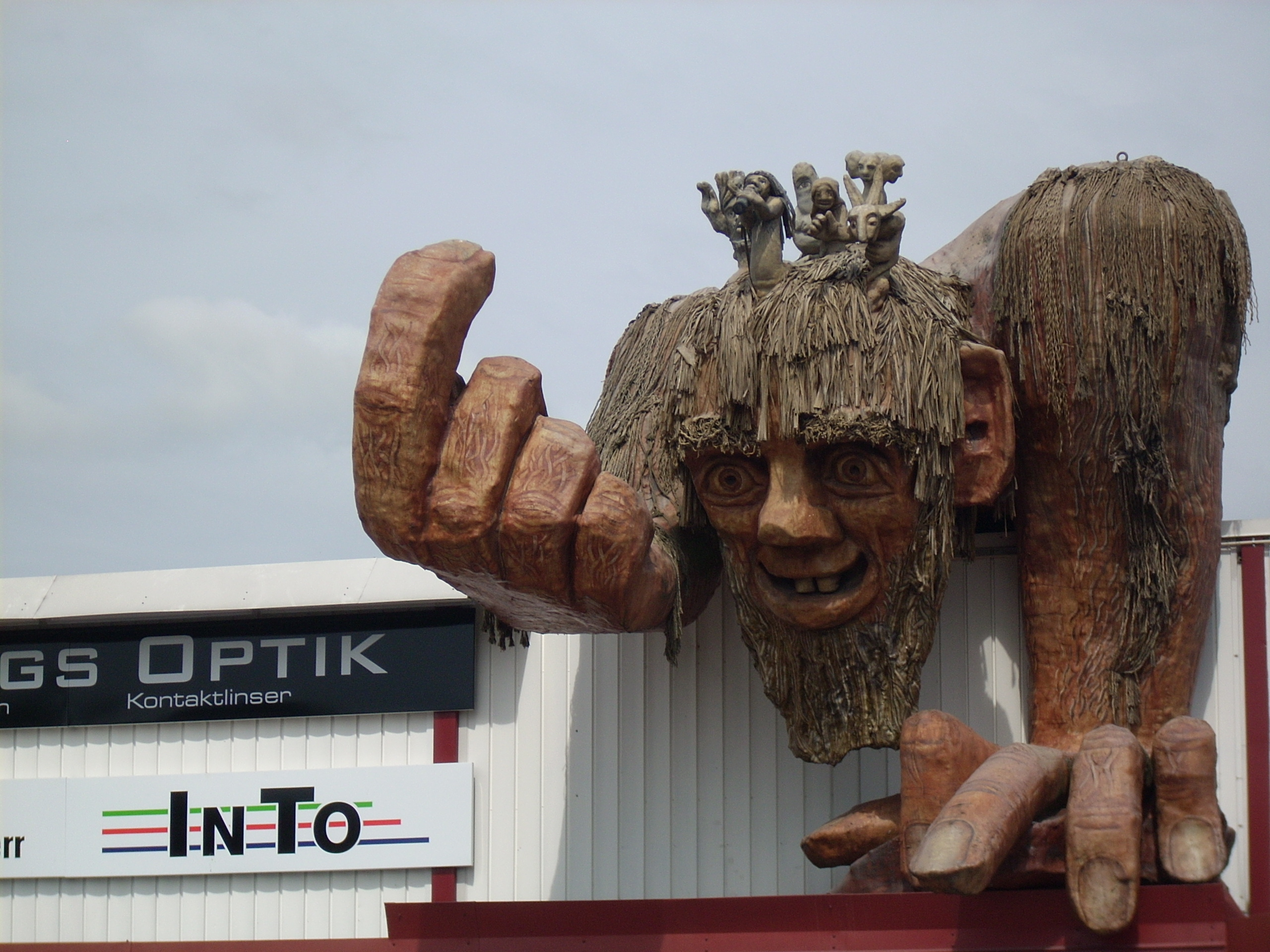
