= Hulta, Blekinge =

Settlement in Blekinge County, Sweden

Coordinates: 56°12′N 15°18′E

Hulta
- Residential area
- Location within Sweden
- Country: Sweden
- Province: Blekinge
- Municipality: Ronneby

Population (2022)
  - Total: 1,593
- Time zone: UTC+1
  - Summer (DST): UTC+2

Hulta is a residential area in Ronneby Municipality, Blekinge County, Sweden, on the eastern side of the town of Ronneby.

== Geography ==
Hulta lies about 1 km (0.62 mi) east of Ronneby's town centre, near the small lake Hultagölen. The area is built up mainly with detached houses with mature gardens, and the undeveloped land around Hultagölen consists of exposed bedrock and hilly woodland. Known ancient remains are located to the southwest of the Hultagölen area.

== Demographics ==
At the 2022 Swedish general election, the Hulta electoral district had 1,593 residents, 1,211 of whom were Swedish citizens of voting age. In the Riksdag election, 54.6% of the district's votes went to the right-wing parties and 44.1% to the left-wing parties.
