= Gunnebo =

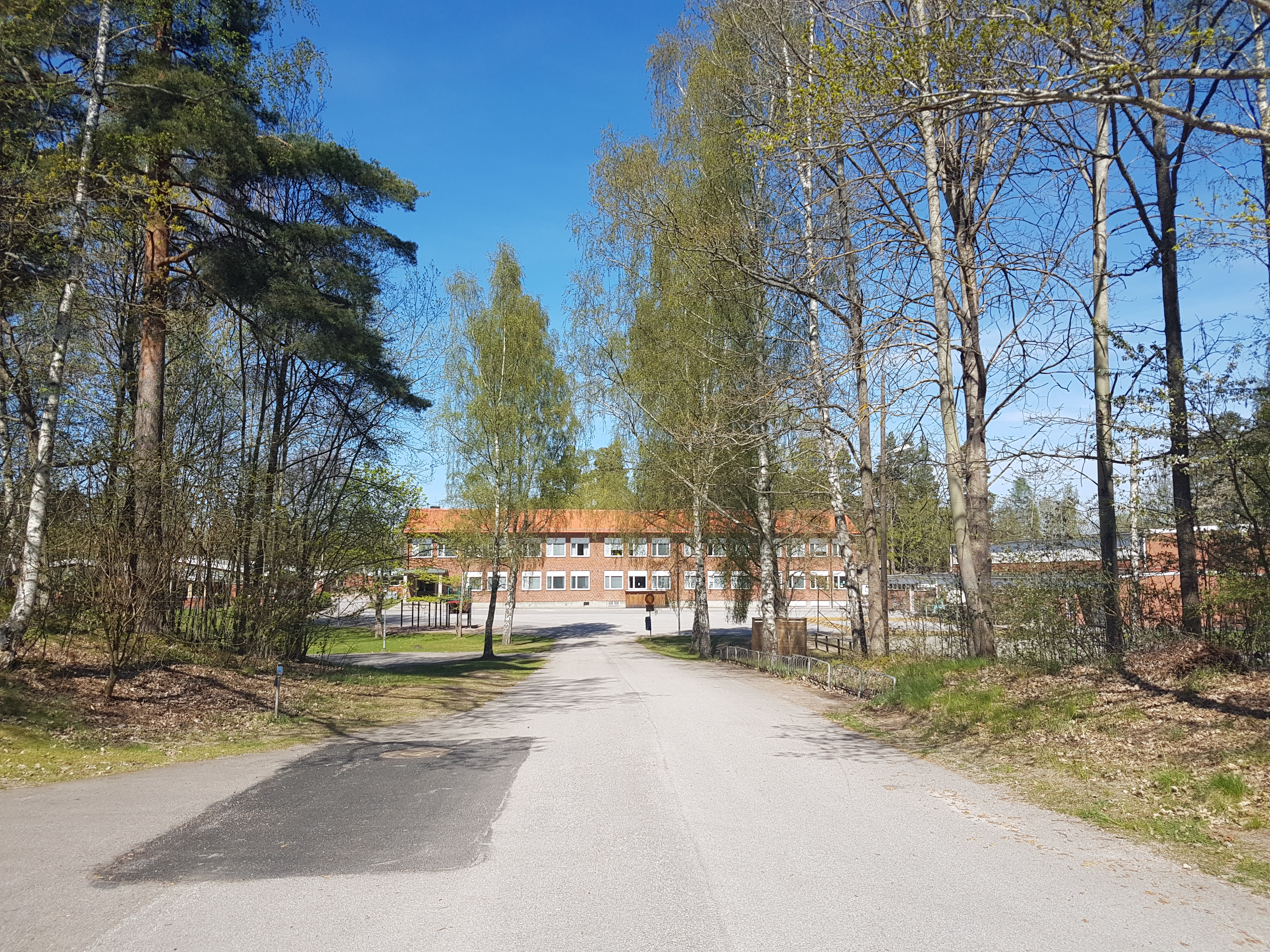
- A school

- Location within Kalmar Location within Sweden
- Coordinates: 57°43′N 16°32′E
- Country: Sweden
- Province: Småland
- County: Kalmar County
- Municipality: Västervik Municipality

Area
  - Total: 1.49 km^{2} (0.58 sq mi)

Population (31 December 2010)
  - Total: 938
  - Density: 631/km^{2} (1,630/sq mi)
- Time zone: UTC+1 (CET)
  - Summer (DST): UTC+2 (CEST)

Gunnebo is a locality situated in Västervik Municipality, Kalmar County, Sweden. In 2010 Gunnebo had 938 inhabitants.
