= Hulta, Jönköping =

Settlement in Jönköping County, Sweden

Coordinates: 57°24′N 14°47′E

Hulta is a settlement in Sävsjö Municipality, Jönköping County, Sweden.
