= Hulta, Örebro =

Settlement in Örebro County, Sweden

Coordinates: 58°42′N 14°59′E

Hulta is a settlement in Hammar district, Askersund Municipality, Örebro County, Sweden.
