= Överum =

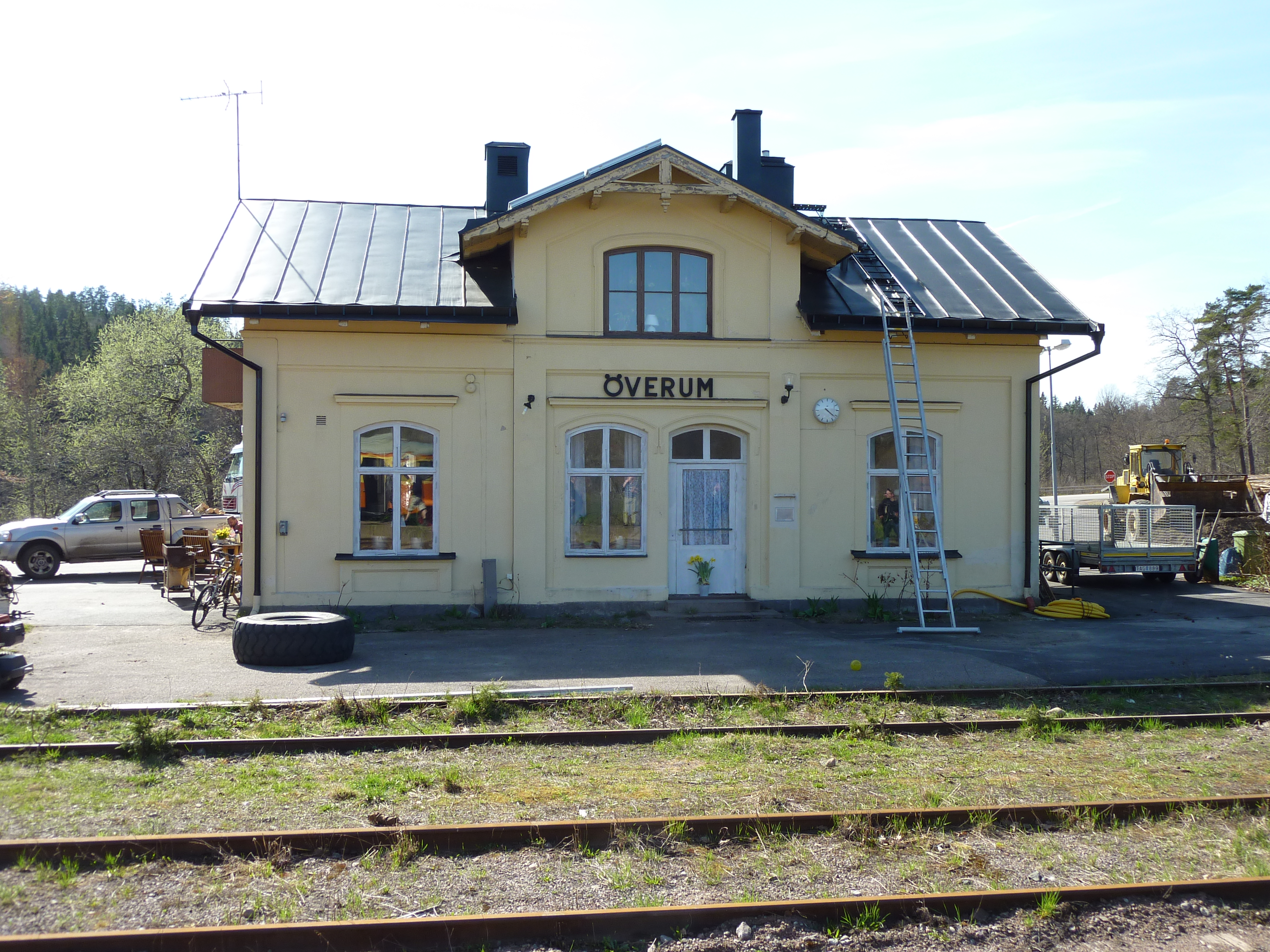
- Överum Station 2011.jpg

- Location within Kalmar Location within Sweden
- Coordinates: 57°59′N 16°19′E
- Country: Sweden
- Province: Småland
- County: Kalmar County
- Municipality: Västervik Municipality

Area
  - Total: 1.92 km^{2} (0.74 sq mi)

Population (31 December 2010)
  - Total: 1,203
  - Density: 627/km^{2} (1,620/sq mi)
- Time zone: UTC+1 (CET)
  - Summer (DST): UTC+2 (CEST)

Överum is a locality in Västervik Municipality, Kalmar County, Sweden with 1,203 inhabitants in 2010.
