= Hulta, Östergötland =

Settlement in Östergötland, Sweden

Coordinates: 58°12′N 15°34′E

Hulta is a settlement in Östergötland, Sweden.
