= Edsbruk =

- Location within Kalmar Location within Sweden
- Coordinates: 58°02′N 16°28′E
- Country: Sweden
- Province: Småland
- County: Kalmar County
- Municipality: Västervik Municipality

Area
  - Total: 0.72 km^{2} (0.28 sq mi)

Population (31 December 2010)
  - Total: 300
  - Density: 419/km^{2} (1,090/sq mi)
- Time zone: UTC+1 (CET)
  - Summer (DST): UTC+2 (CEST)

Edsbruk is a locality situated in Västervik Municipality, Kalmar County, Sweden with 300 inhabitants in 2010.

The community was originally named Ed. In 1670 Abraham Parment established an ironworks there, Eds Bruk, which employed a large number of the inhabitants. When postal service was established there, the post office renamed the town Edsbruk after the plant to distinguish it from another place called Ed. The ironworks closed during the economic crisis at the end of the 19th century and was replaced by a cellulose plant founded by Alfred de Maré; this closed in 1992.
