= Hulta, Kronoberg =

Settlement in Kronoberg County, Sweden

Coordinates: 56°39′N 15°07′E

Hulta is a settlement in Kronoberg County, Sweden.
