= Västervik Municipality =

Västervik Municipality Västerviks kommun
- Municipality
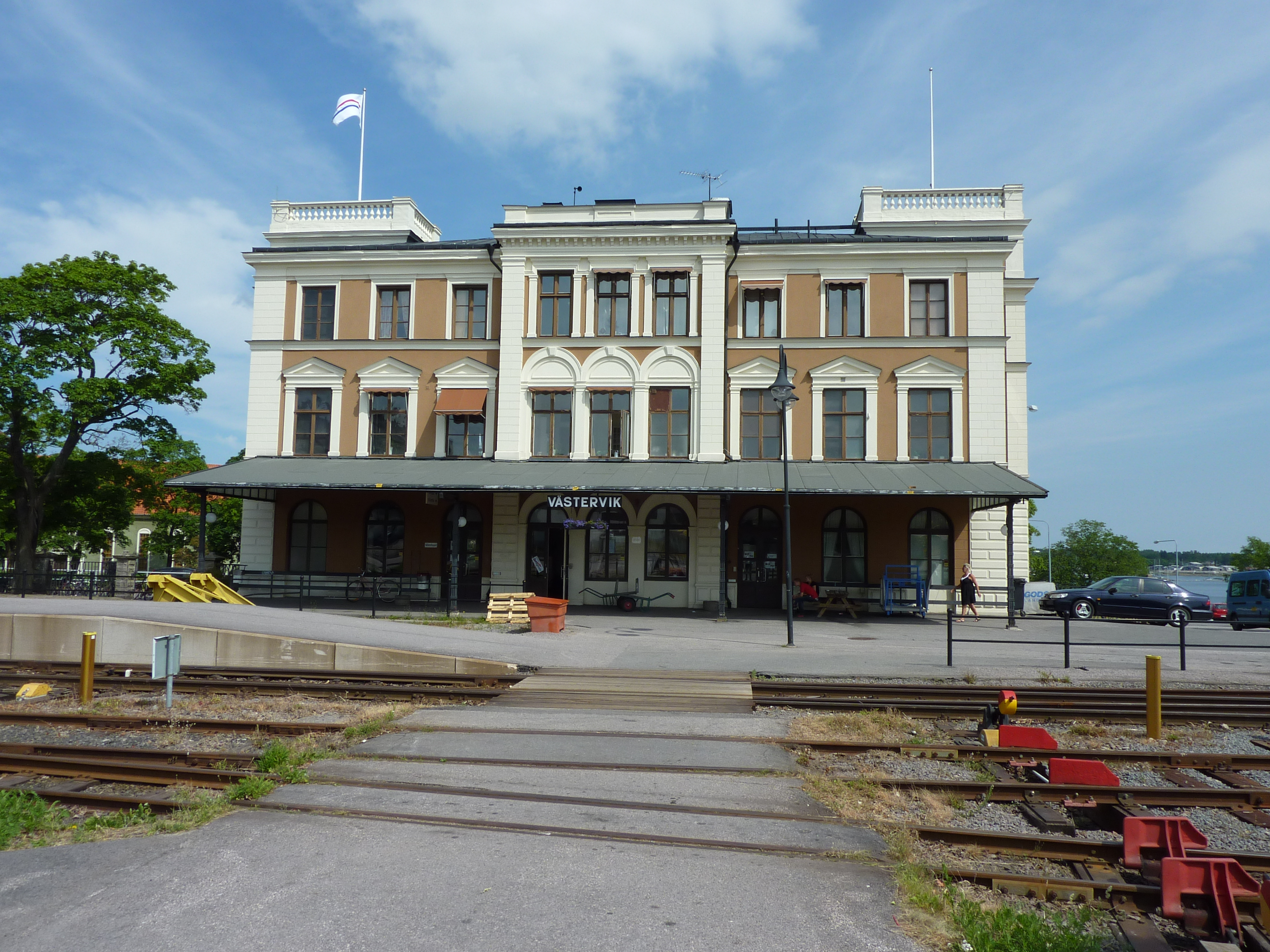
- Västervik Railway Station

- Flag Coat of arms

- Coordinates: 57°45′N 16°38′E
- Country: Sweden
- County: Kalmar County
- Seat: Västervik

Area
  - Total: 3,596.85 km^{2} (1,388.75 sq mi)
  - Land: 1,874.43 km^{2} (723.72 sq mi)
  - Water: 1,722.42 km^{2} (665.03 sq mi)
- Area as of 1 January 2014.

Population (30 June 2025)
  - Total: 36,366
  - Density: 19.401/km^{2} (50.249/sq mi)
- Time zone: UTC+1 (CET)
  - Summer (DST): UTC+2 (CEST)
- ISO 3166 code: SE
- Province: Småland
- Municipal code: 0883
- Website: www.vastervik.se

Västervik Municipality (Swedish: Västerviks kommun) is a municipality in Kalmar County, south-eastern Sweden, with its seat in the city of Västervik.

The present municipality was created in 1971, when the former City of Västervik was amalgamated with eight surrounding rural municipalities.

== Localities ==
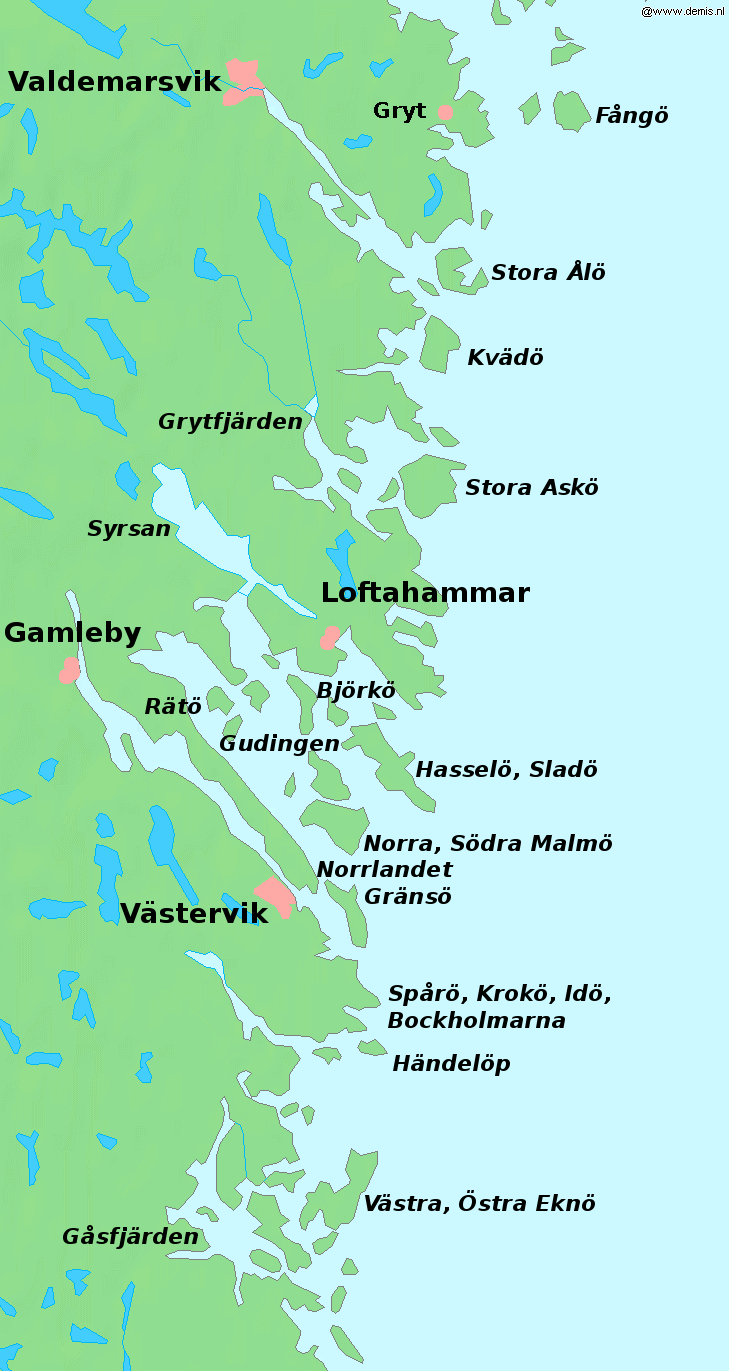
The municipalities of Västervik and (partially) Valdemarsvik belong to the Tjust region with an extensive coastal archipelago.

There are 11 urban areas (also called localities, Swedish: tätorter) in Västervik Municipality.

In the table the localities are listed according to the size of the population as of December 31, 2005. The municipal seat is in bold characters.

#	Locality	Population
1	**Västervik**	20,694
2	Gamleby	2,805
3	Ankarsrum	1,337
4	Överum	1,270
5	Gunnebo	989
6	Piperskärr	462
7	Loftahammar	432
8	Hjorted	338
9	Edsbruk	311
10	Totebo	256
11	Almvik	202

== Demographics ==
This is a demographic table based on Västervik Municipality's electoral districts in the 2022 Swedish general election sourced from SVT's election platform, in turn taken from SCB official statistics.

In total there were including 36,704 residents, including 29,293 Swedish citizens of voting age. 48.2 % voted for the left coalition and 50.3 % for the right coalition. Indicators are in percentage points except population totals and income.

Location	Residents	Citizen adults	Left vote	Right vote	Employed	Swedish parents	Foreign heritage	Income SEK	Degree
Location			%	%					
Blackstad-Odensvi	1,283	1,034	42.6	56.2	85	94	6	22,940	29
Brevik	1,556	1,225	50.5	48.6	83	89	11	26,246	44
Centrum	1,783	1,663	45.4	53.8	82	88	12	24,957	44
Djurgården-Törnfall	1,833	1,410	41.2	57.5	85	91	9	28,806	50
Gamleby 1	1,927	1,500	46.8	51.2	74	83	17	19,342	26
Gamleby 2-Lofta	1,838	1,436	42.8	54.9	79	88	12	22,614	29
Gladhammar-Västrum	1,668	1,269	47.8	50.0	76	81	19	21,799	30
Hallingeberg S	1,343	1,034	52.4	46.3	76	83	17	20,985	25
Hjorted	1,319	1,030	51.9	46.7	80	88	12	21,744	29
Jenny-Kvännaren	1,772	1,316	43.9	54.8	89	91	9	27,758	40
Johannesdal	2,093	1,627	55.0	43.1	78	78	22	23,689	33
Karstorp	1,705	1,360	56.2	41.3	70	72	28	19,105	25
Loftahammar	749	661	44.2	54.9	80	92	8	21,613	33
Ludvigsdal-Hornslandet	1,930	1,512	48.3	50.5	87	90	10	27,169	40
Marieborg	1,505	1,231	50.4	48.0	81	87	13	23,619	42
Peru	1,255	1,011	48.7	49.1	80	84	16	23,671	35
Piperskärr-Gränsö	1,817	1,497	37.4	61.7	84	92	8	30,637	51
Skogshaga	2,077	1,588	56.7	42.3	78	82	18	23,743	33
Södermalm	1,482	1,145	56.7	40.8	69	69	31	19,179	31
Ukna-Västra Ed	1,254	1,040	45.5	52.8	77	92	8	19,602	31
Västralund-Stenhagen	1,603	1,322	47.5	51.1	85	93	7	26,526	42
Östermalm	1,487	1,231	54.0	45.1	80	85	15	23,661	37
Överum	1,425	1,151	47.5	50.3	74	86	14	19,920	19
Source: SVT

== International relations ==
=== Twin towns — Sister cities ===
The municipality is twinned with:

- Tønder Municipality, Denmark
- Närpes, Finland
- Akranes, Iceland
- Ventspils, Latvia
- Bamble, Norway
