= Ljungberg =

Ljungberg is a Swedish surname derived from ljung (heather) and berg (mountain). Youngberg is an Americanized variant of the name.

Notable persons with this name include:

- Anders Ljungberg (born 1947), Swedish footballer
- Annika Ljungberg (born 1969), Swedish pop singer
- Birger Ljungberg (1884–1967), Norwegian politician
- Blenda Ljungberg (1907–1994), Swedish politician
- Bo Ljungberg (1911–1984), Swedish athletics competitor
- Einar Texas Ljungberg (1880–1974), Swedish politician
- Emma Ljungberg (born 1994), Swedish discus thrower
- Freddie Ljungberg (born 1977), Swedish footballer and manager
- Göta Ljungberg (1893–1955), Swedish soprano
- Hanna Ljungberg (born 1979), Swedish footballer
- Hans Ljungberg (1948–2020), Swedish swimmer
- Helge Ljungberg (1904–1983), Swedish bishop and religious historian
- Jon Ljungberg, American TV personality and comedian
- Jörgen Ljungberg (born 1967), Swedish powerlifter and strongman
- Karl Ljungberg, Swedish civil engineer and sailor
- Lars Ljungberg (born 1977), Swedish musician
- Märta Ljungberg (1656–1741), Swedish innkeeper
- Mikael Ljungberg (1970–2004), Swedish wrestler
- Mikael Ljungberg (curler) (born 1961), Swedish male curler
- Sven Ljungberg (1913–2010), Swedish artist

== See also ==
- Thomas Ljungbergh (born 1963), Swedish ice hockey player
- Ljungberg Museum in Ljungby, Sweden
