= Småland Runic Inscription 35 =

Coordinates: 56.84783°N 13.97469°E

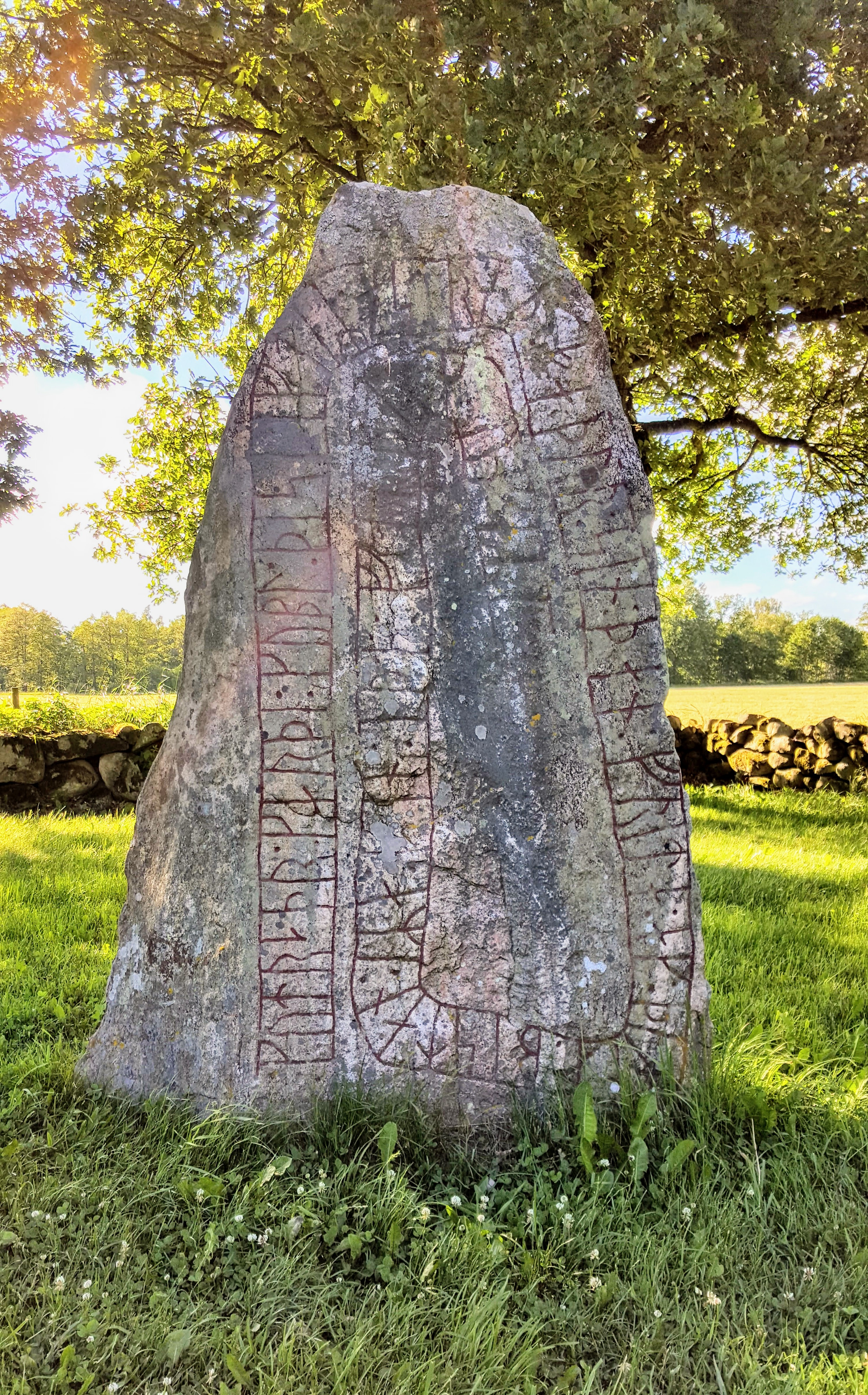
- Created: 11th century
- Discovered: Ljungby, Kronoberg, Sweden
- Rundata ID: Sm 35
- Runemaster: unknown

The Replösa Stone (Also Småland Runic Inscription 35, Sm 35, and Ljungby 28:1) is a runestone in Replösa near Ljungby, Sweden.

== The stone ==
The stone is made of granite, is 185 centimetres (73 in) tall and 90 centimetres (35 in) wide. The runiform ornament and inscription on the stone's southeastern side have 13–15 centimetres (5.1–5.9 in) high runes. The inscription is from the 11th century.

== Inscription ==
Transliteration, and normalization to Old West Norse and Old East Norse:

: kutraþr : karþi : kubl : þisi : iftiʀ : astraþ : faþur : sin : þan : frita : ak : þih:na : bistan : iʀ a : fin:iþi : forþum : uf| |faʀi :
{} Gautráðr {} gerði {} kuml {} þessi {} eptir {} Ástráð, {} fǫður {} sinn, {} þann {} frænda {} ok {} þegna {} beztan, {} er á {} Finnheiði {} forðum {} of væri. {}
{} Gautraðr {} gærði {} kumbl {} þessi {} æftiʀ {} Astrað, {} faður {} sinn, {} þann {} frænda {} ok {} þegna {} bæztan, {} eʀ a {} Finnhæiði {} forðum {} of vaʀi. {}
Gautráðr made these monuments in memory of Ástráðr, his father, the best of kinsmen and Þegns, who formerly was in Finnheiðr.

== Interpretation ==
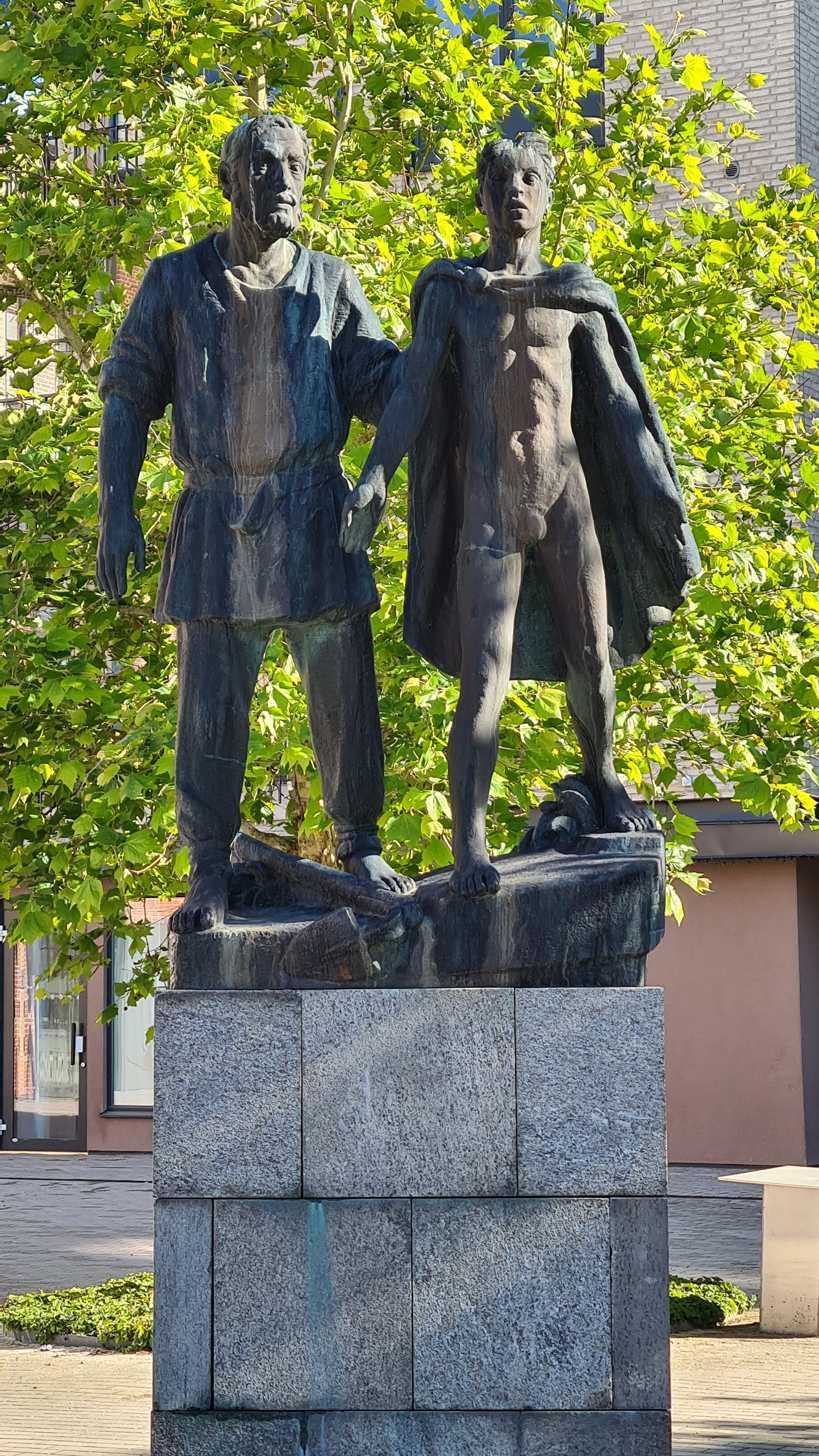
Odlarmonumentet, an artist's impression of Astrad and Götrad at Ljungby central square, by John Lundqvist.

The Danish sounding names Götrad and Åstrad are uncommon. From the Middle Ages only a few persons are known to bear the name Åstrad. The name have also appeared on Danish runestones. The name Götrad does not appear on any other known runestone. Finnveden mentioned on the stone was one of the "countries" that would later be included in the province of Småland. Finnveden is mentioned on three runestones: Sm 35, Sm 52 in Småland, and U 130 in Uppland. The word "thane" (þegna) can be seen in a number of runic inscriptions, but opinions are divided of its meaning. The two main opinions are "free farmer, odalman (Similar to yeomen)" respectively "warrior, member of the king's hird".

== The ship setting ==
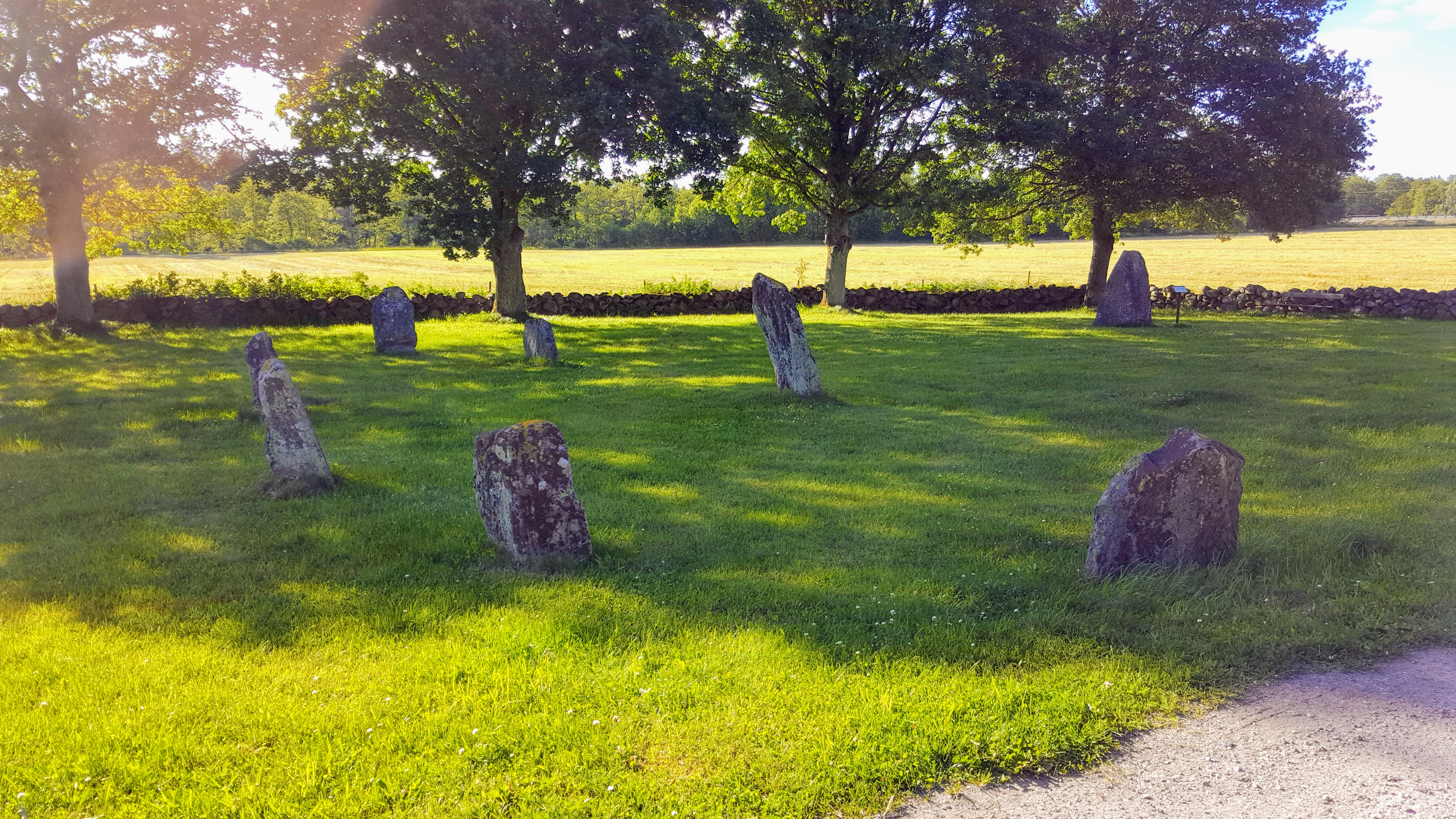
Replösa Ship Setting with the Replösa Stone in the background.

Just south of the runestone lies Ljungby 29:1, a damaged, but partly restored, ship setting. It is 17 metres (56 ft) long, 6 metres (20 ft) wide, and made out of seven erected stones that are 80–150 centimetres (31–59 in) tall. According to historical data there have been twelve stones.

== See also ==
- History of Sweden (800–1521)
