= Vera Sandberg =

Sweden's first female engineer

Vera Helfrid Victoria Sandberg
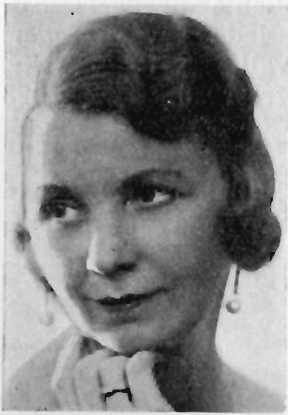
- Vera Sandberg from Svenska Teknologföreningen's biographies.
- Born: 23 May 1895; Ljungby, Sweden
- Died: 24 December 1979 (aged 84); Stockholm, Sweden
- Education: Chemistry, Chalmers University of Technology
- Occupation: Engineer

Vera Helfrid Victoria Sandberg (born 23 May 1895 at Hångers gård (Eng:Hångers farm) in Ljungby; died 24 December 1979 in Stockholm) was a Swedish engineer. In 1917, she became Sweden's first female engineer.

== Biography ==
Vera Sandberg grew up at Långasjönäs in Asarums parish in the province of Blekinge. When she entered Chalmers University of Technology in 1914 she was the only woman among 500 male students. In 1917, she achieved her degree in chemistry, and after that she started working at AB Skandinaviska Raffineriet in Partille, as well as positions at Oljefabriken i Karlshamn, Helsingborgs Gummifabrik and at Sieverts Kabelverk in Sundbyberg. She married engineer Ragnar Adolf Resare in 1937. The couple resided in Storfors for several years, when she mainly focused on her family. Until 1965 she was part-owner of Långasjönäs Pappersbruk and was included in the board on a regular basis.

== Legacy ==
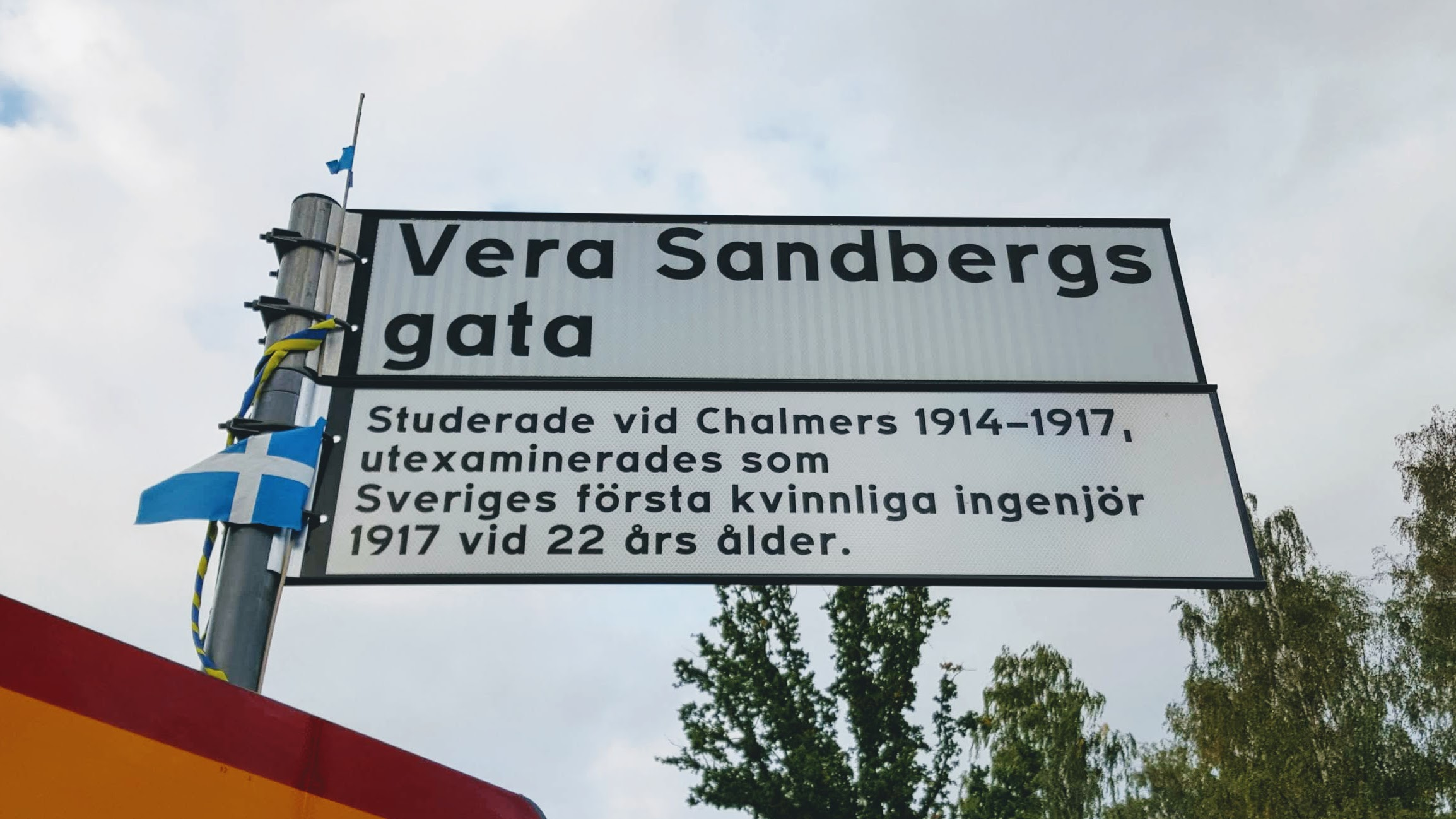
Vera Sandberg's street in Ljungby, with a brief biography.

Vera Sandberg has given her name to several things, among other:

- Chalmersspexet Vera, spex performed by Chalmers Students' Union.
- Vera Sandbergs Allé, allée in Gothenburg.
- One of Chalmer's hot-air balloons.
- A conference room at Chalmer's student union building.
- Event space at Chalmers called Veras Gräsmatta (Vera's Lawn).
- Chalmer's team, Chalmers Vera Team, in the competition Eco Marathon.
- Vera Sandbergs gata, a street in Ljungby.

In June 2019, a statue was unveiled in her honour by Chalmers University of Technology on Vera Sandberg Avenue in Gothenburg, created by sculptor Jan Cardell.

== Sources ==
- Sveriges dödbok 1947-2006, (CD-ROM), Sveriges Släktforskarförbund
- Svenska DagblExterna links - Vera Resare (1979-12-30)
