= Youngberg =

Youngberg may refer to:

== People ==
- Brett Youngberg (born 1979), Canadian volleyball player
- Garth Youngberg, founder and director of the Institute for Alternative Agriculture
- Jordan Youngberg, American politician and businessman, member of the South Dakota Senate from 2017 to 2020
- Renae Youngberg (1933–2015), American baseball player in the All-American Girls Professional Baseball League

== Other uses ==
- Youngberg, Arizona, United States, a populated place
- Youngberg v. Romeo, a landmark United States Supreme Court case regarding the rights of the involuntarily committed and intellectually disabled
