= Ljungby =

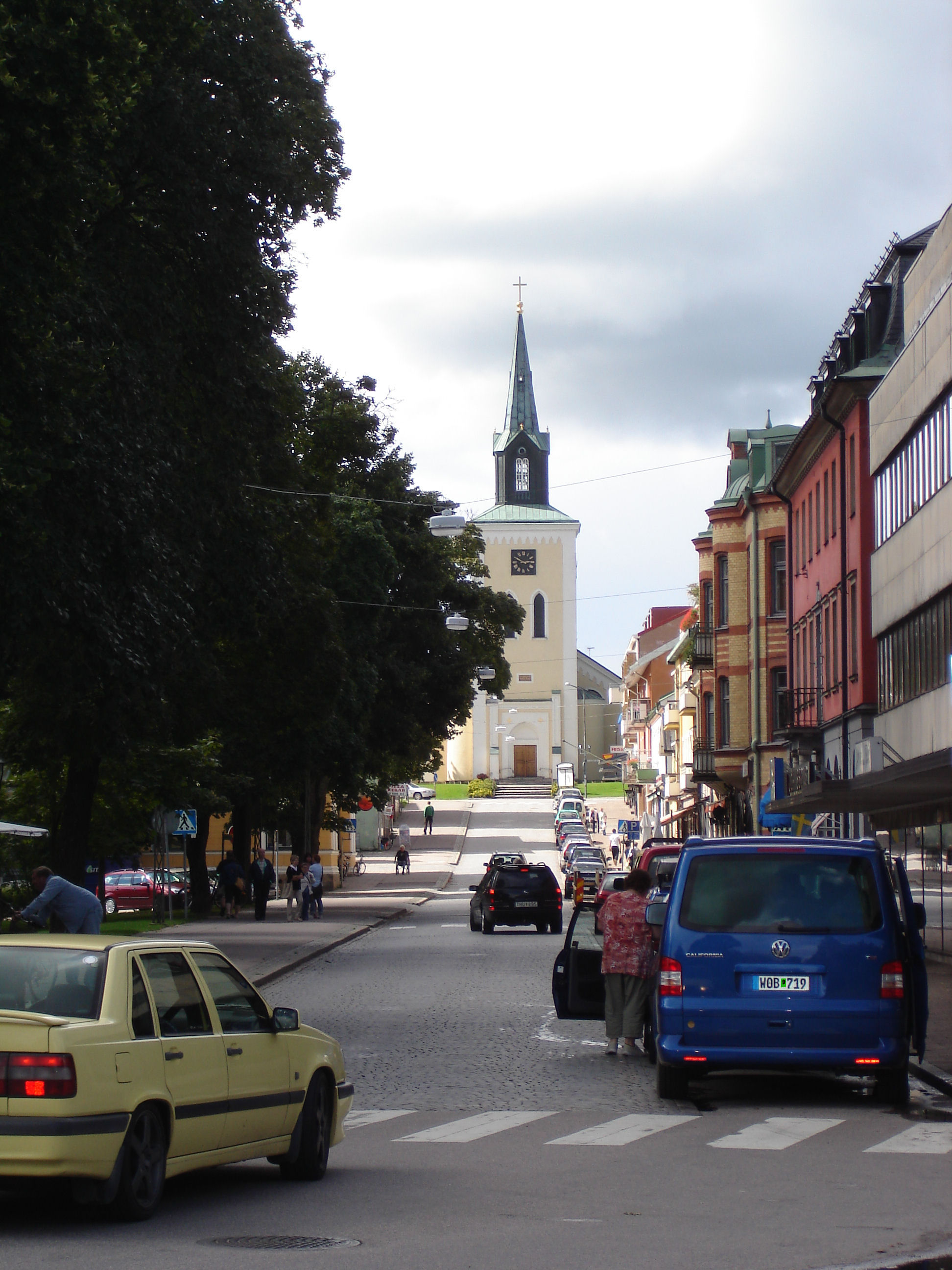
- Storgatan with Ljungby Church in the background.

- Coat of arms

- Location within Kronoberg Location within Sweden
- Coordinates: 56°50′N 13°56′E
- Country: Sweden
- Province: Småland
- County: Kronoberg County
- Municipality: Ljungby Municipality

Area
  - Total: 11.93 km^{2} (4.61 sq mi)

Population (31 December 2010)
  - Total: 15,205
  - Density: 1,274/km^{2} (3,300/sq mi)
- Time zone: UTC+1 (CET)
  - Summer (DST): UTC+2 (CEST)

Ljungby (Swedish: [ˈjɵ̂ŋːbʏ]) is the central locality of Ljungby Municipality, Kronoberg County, Sweden, with 15,785 inhabitants in 2015.

Ljungby was instituted in 1829 as a köping, or market town, and did not become a municipality of its own when the first local government acts took effect in 1863, but retained part of the surrounding rural municipality of the same name. In 1936 Ljungby got the title stad, Swedish for Town or City. Since 1971 Ljungby is the seat of Ljungby Municipality.

Much of the town center was destroyed in the city fire of 1953. At the time of the rebuilding, International Style architecture was used, characterized locally by the Hotel Terazza and adjacent structures, which still remains controversial locally.

== History ==
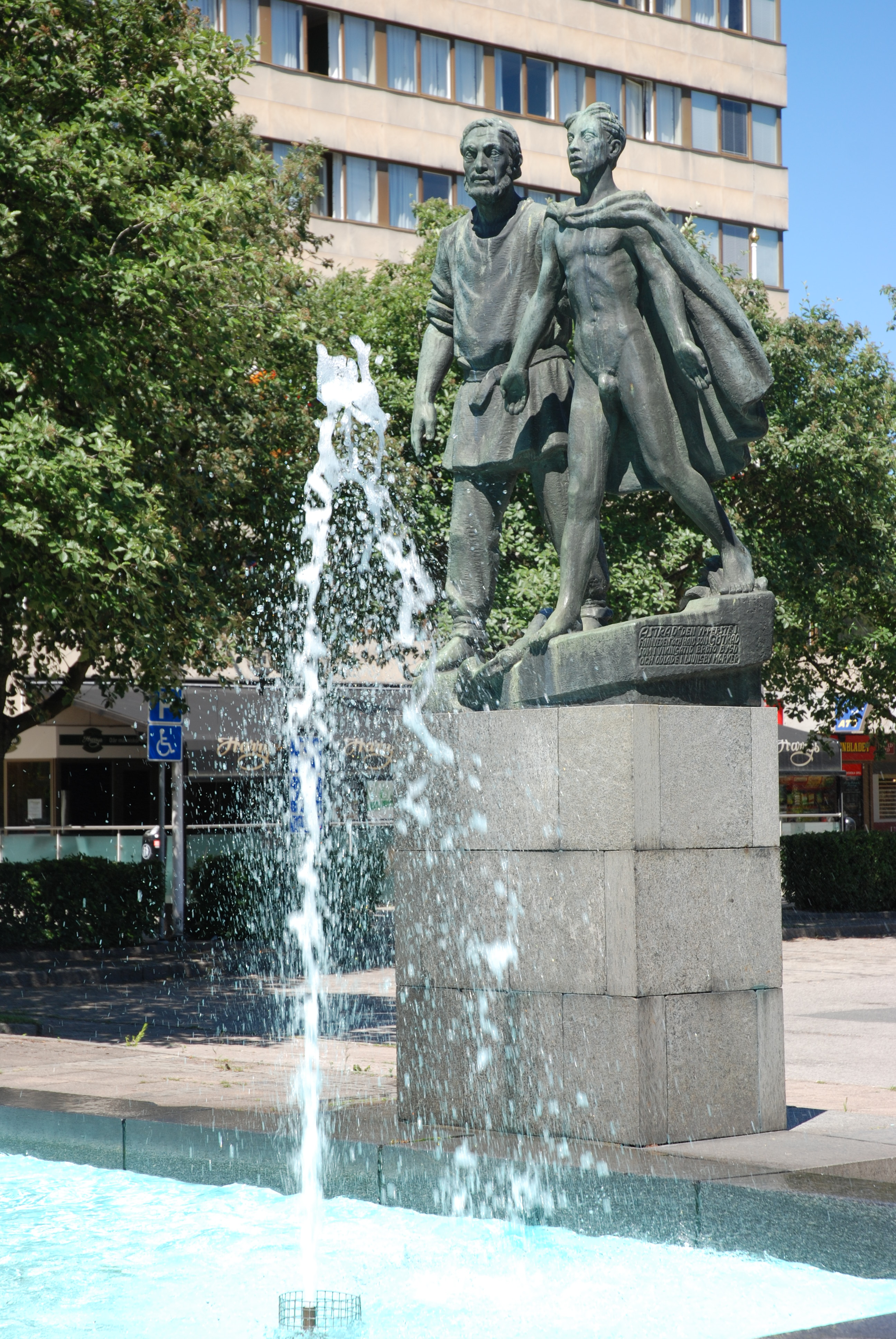
Bronze statue by John Lundqvist depicting Astrad and Götrad, the first known inhabitants of Ljungby.

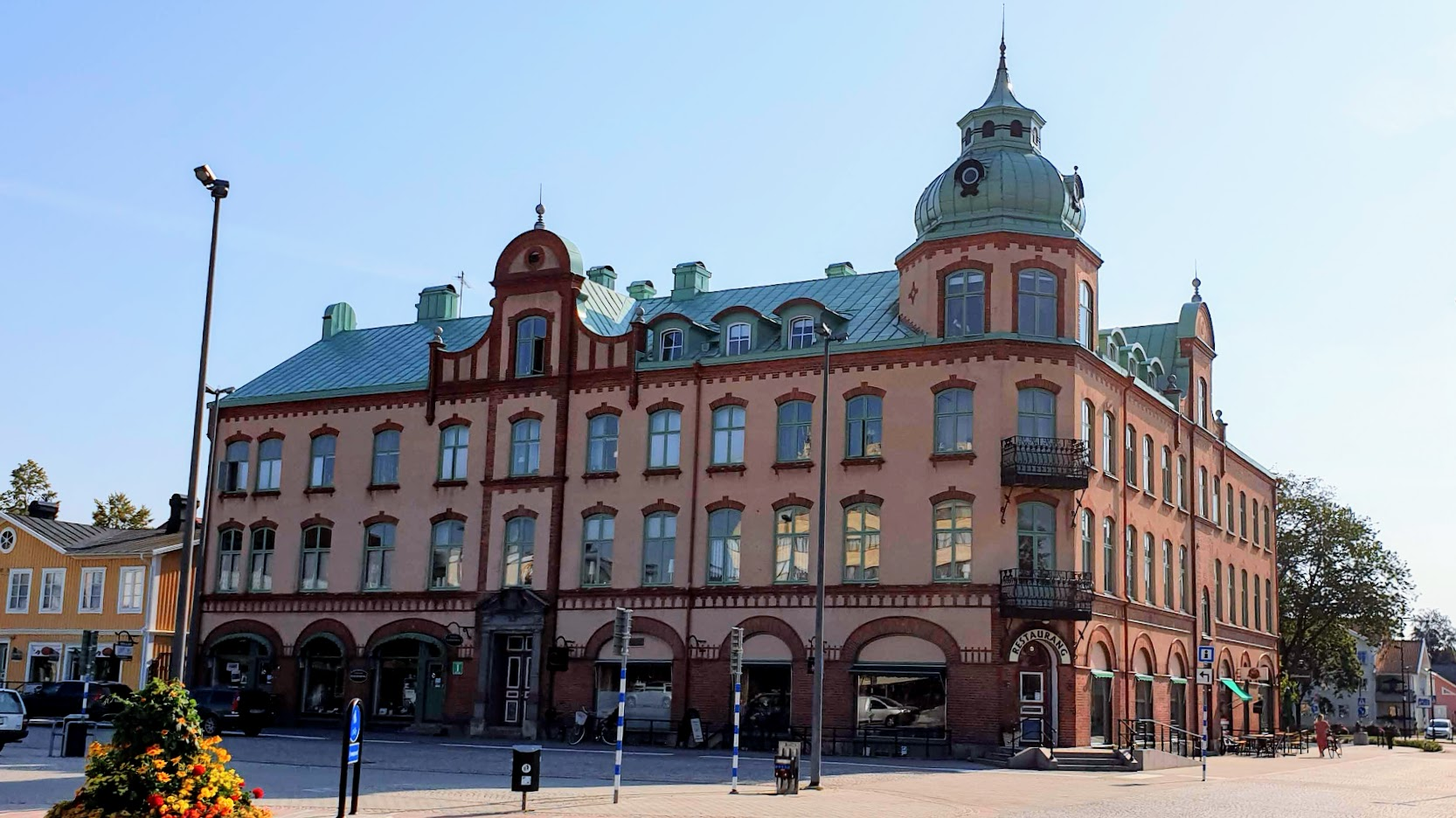
Tellushuset is one of the few historical buildings that wasn't destroyed in the 1953 fire. The former city center, that existed before the fire, was built in a similar style.

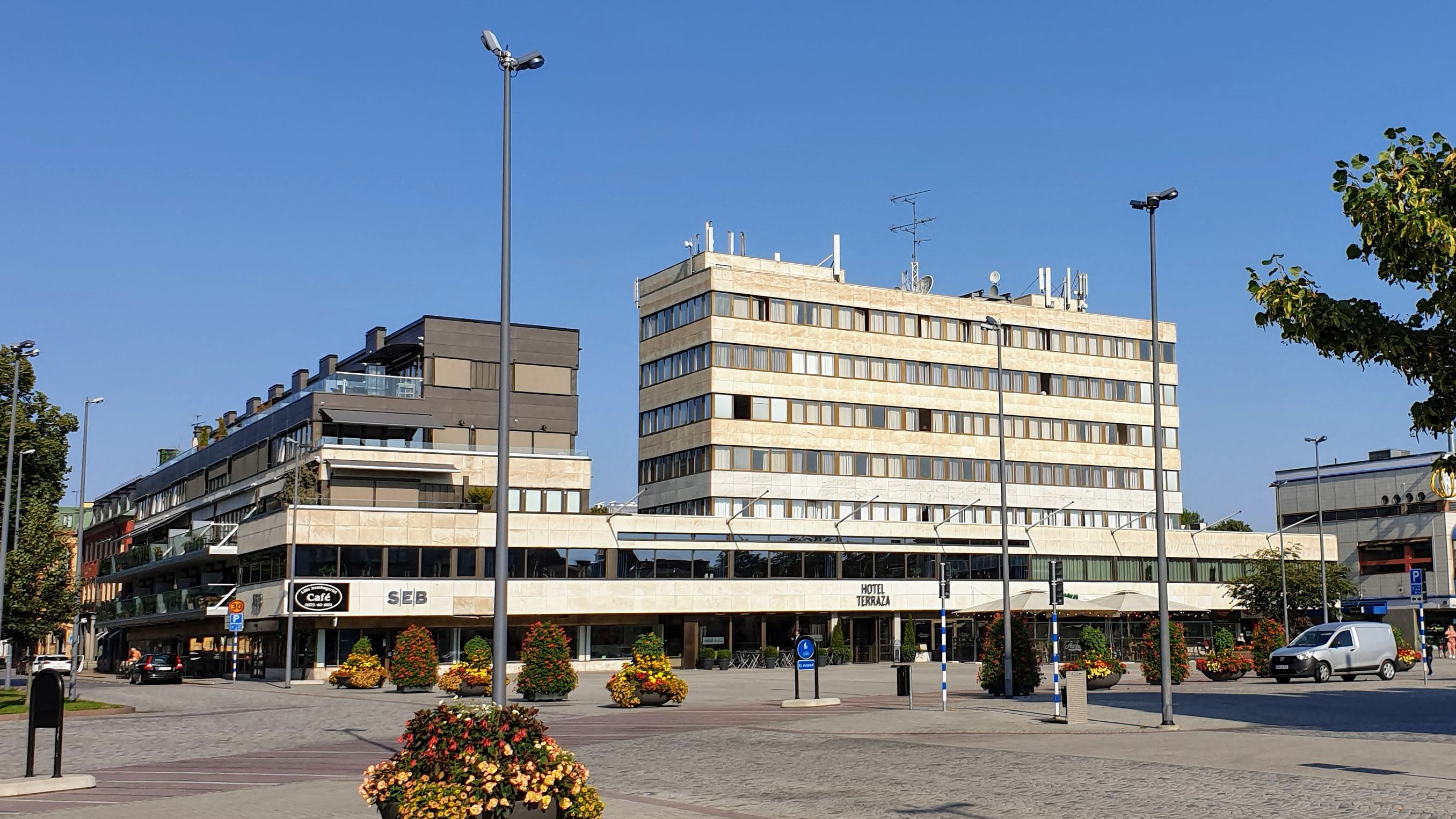
After the fire of 1953 many of the buildings was rebuilt in a then modern style, which today is still considered controversial. The picture shows Hotell Terraza with its international style.

The first known inhabitant of the area that is today's Ljungby was Astrad, as can be read on the runestone Replösastenen from the 11th century located a couple of kilometers from the city center. The runestone says: "Götrad made this stone after Astrad, the foremost of kinsmen and yeomen (Swedish: odalmän) who in Finnveden formerly lived". In 1952 a statue by John Lundqvist was erected near the main plaza depicting Astrad and Götrad. But there were other people living around Ljungby long before Astrad and Götrad as evident by the numerous burial mounds in the area. One of the largest burial mounds lies close to the water tower and is named Kungshögen. The largest burial is however Höga rör that lies some kilometers south of Ljungby on the slope of the Lagan river valley.

In the 12th century the first stone church was built with the formation of the parish Ljungby socken. Ljungby had for a long time been the crossroad where the two important north–south and east–west trade routes met. Because of this a hostelry was built adjacent to the Laganstigen in the 14th century by royal decree.

In 1828 Ljungby only consisted of five farms. It was in the beginning of the 19th century the need for a city in Sunnerbo hundred was raised. Ljungby competed with the village Berga, where bishop Henrik had obtained permission to found a city. As Ljungby was considered to be located more central in the hundred and had better road connections, the choice fell on the latter option.

According to a royal letter from 15 October 1828, Ljungby was made a friköping with regulations on 28 March 1829, according to three sources, and on 1 January 1830, according to another. Ljungby was founded mostly on property that was donated by Märta Ljungberg, operator of Ljungby's hostelry. A town plan with perpendicular roads was used as base when the town's buildings was planned. The city plan would later be split with the arrival of the railroad. In 1878 the railroad between Vislanda and Bolmen, via Ljungby, was opened. The railroad would later be linked with Karlshamn–Vislanda–Bolmens railroad (KVBJ) and Halmstad–Bolmen Railroad (HBJ). In 1899 the north–south stretch Skåne–Smålands Railroad (SSJ) was opened.

During the 20th century the town expanded with the help of the workshop and wood industry.

The first population boom started at the end of the 1940s and culminated in the 1960s. Luckily this coincided with the increased need of work by the growing industry in the urban area with the need of work decreasing in the rural areas. The growth was also supported by the labor immigration that began in the post-war period.

=== The town centre fire of 1953 ===
During the night between 4 and 5 July 1953 a fire started at Gustaf Svenssons Bilverkstad (English: Gustaf Svensson's Garage) by the street Eskilsgatan at block Stjärnan. The garage was a wooden building with cans of petrol and oil on the floor. First on site was Ljungby fire department, no more than five minutes after the alarm, and could confirm that the fire had started at the garage. Once the fire had taken hold it continued to spread eastward towards the other wooden buildings in block Stjärnan. The fire department had hoped that the street Föreningsgatan would work as a fire road, but the wind brought with it sparks and flames, and soon stood parts of block Kometen also ablaze.

Next to block Kometen, by the street Kungsgatan, lied Ljungby's Telegraph and Telephone Station, who tried to protect themself behind suspended soaked cloths. The nightstaff could not handle the increased traffic pressure the fire had brought with it and had to call in additional staff, who also had to evacuate archives and machines from the building. The Telegraph and Telephone Station survived the fire after the firefighters managed to extinguished it with foam.

In an attempt to gain control over the fire Ljungby called on reinforcement from Hamneda, Angelstad, Ryssby, Växjö, Älmhult, and Strömsnäsbruk. Police from Växjö were also called in to support Ljungby's police force with directing traffic and to prevent people from entering the scene of fire. Due to an error the fire department from Lagan were not summoned. The fire departments' efforts were weakened as only one of the pumps at Ljungby water plant was in operation. The activation of the second pump was delayed as the regular mechanic was on vacation and the substitute mechanic had troubles getting the machinery started. Despite the activation of both pumps at the water plant there were still not enough water to put out the fires. The fire departments had to activate the river pump by Lagan River and pump in untreated raw water into Ljungby's water supply. A wagon with water pipes from the civil defence were also requisitioned. The pipes were laid from the river all the way to the city centre and gave water to five fire hoses. It is said that the pipe ended at the square basin by the statue of Astrad and Götrad.

At most; nine motor pumps were used with a total capacity of 10,900 litres (2,900 US gal) per minute and 3,225 metres (3,527 yd) fire hoses were pulled out and used.

==== Aftermath ====
During the days after the fire it was concluded that 7,200 square metres (78,000 sq ft) floor space had been destroyed and that twenty buildings had been affected by the fire; whereof 28 residential flats, 24 business flats, 12 workshops, and 9 warehouses. Most of the buildings where from the days when Ljungby was just a market town, built before 1936. Thirty families became homeless and 96 people became unemployed. It was estimated that a value of three million kronor had been destroyed by the fire. No person was killed, but seven firefighters had to visit Ljungby hospital; six of them could leave shortly thereafter and one had to stay.

As untreated raw water had been pumped in into Ljungby's water supply network from the Lagan River the Health Department issued a request for everyone to boil their water before using it. This was particularly important as there was a high risk that sewage water had entered the water supply and as the deadly salmonella outbreak The Alvesta Epidemic had recently reached its peak.

There were rumours that looting had occurred during the fire. However, no reports were received and according to police and firefighters on site all went well, apart for some drunk people who disturbed the peace.

There were plans to build huts on the square so that the affected businesses could continue their trade while rebuilding. But many business continued their trade at other temporary premises, which was noticed as only 15 out of the 96 unemployed reported to the Employment Service the following days.

The reconstruction of the city centre consisted of buildings and a piazza in a more modern international style. This style is particularly evident in the seven-storey hotel Terraza which replaced the four-story hotel Stadshotellet. The plan was to demolish Stadshotellet in the spring of 1961, but instead it burned down on 18 December 1960.

=== Administration ===
Ljungby became a friköping (or chipping in English) on 15 October 1828, with the regulations decided on 28 March 1829. On 31 January 1879, Ljungby chipping's rules and regulations, building bylaws, and the fire charter was issued. On 10 February 1893 it was decided that the health care charter would also apply in the chipping. 1900 the concept municipalsamhälle was introduced into Sweden's legislation and Ljungby chipping was transformed into Ljungby köping municipalsamhälle. This was due to the fact that at least one of the town's charters was applied to the area and didn't belong to a stadskommun (approx. town municipality) or köpingskommun (approx. chipping municipality). On 3 July 1902 a special arrangement Charter was issued for Ljungby köping municipalsamhälle. On 7 October 1921 the area of Ljungby municipalsamhälle was increased from 0.98 km^{2} (0.37 mi^{2}) to 3.50 km^{2} (1.35 mi^{2}).

Ljungby was, and is, the "church village" of Ljungby parish and belonged to Ljungby rural municipality after 1862 Swedish municipal reform. On 1 January 1936 Ljungby parish and rural municipality was reformed into Ljungby stad. This was in accordance with a decision made on 20 September 1935 that gave Ljungby the title "stad" (English: town or city). With 1971 Swedish municipal reforms Ljungby stad and the rural municipality was ascended into Ljungby municipality with Ljungby being the central locality.

== Transport ==
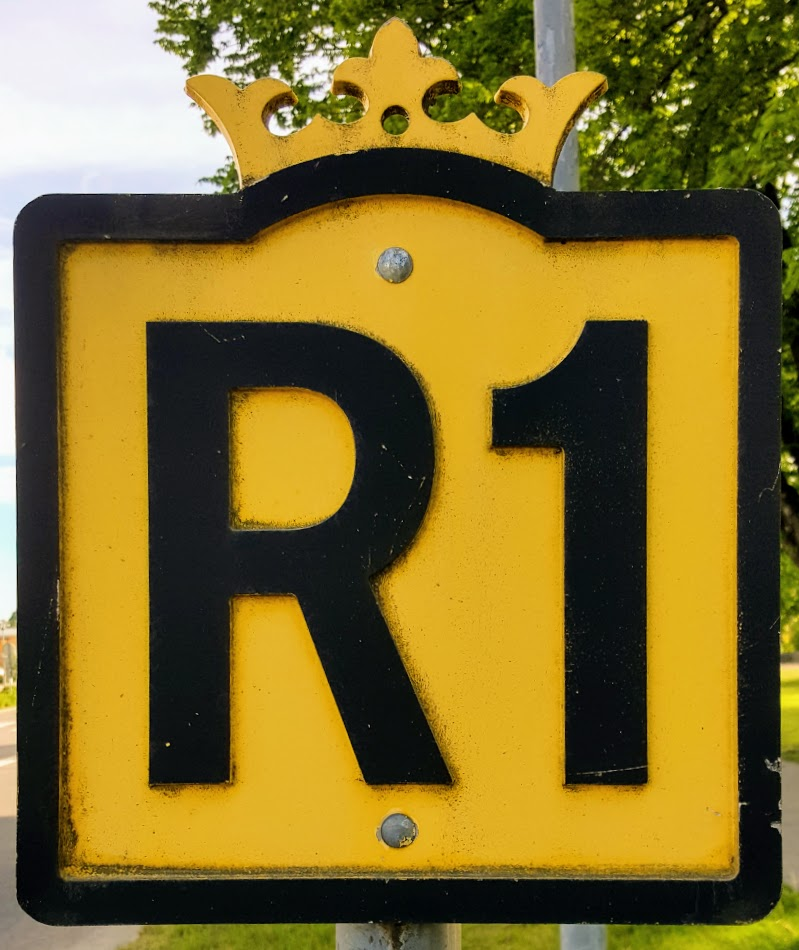
The scenic route Riksettan goes through Ljungby city center.

Ljungby has good road connections as it lies where the E4 and national road 25 intersects. The town is also pierced by the scenic route Riksettan.

Ljungby has a small airport, Ljungby-Feringe airport, without regular services about 13 kilometers to the northeast. The airport is owned by Feringe Flygklubb and is mostly used by sports planes, gliders, and parachutists. The closest airport with passenger traffic is Växjö Småland Airport.

There were earlier railroad connections in four directions with narrow-gauge railways towards Halmstad and Vislanda, and standard gauge towards Värnamo and Markaryd. These lines are now defunct and the tracks have been removed.

Most of the railway embankments have been converted into bicycle paths. The northerly embankment connects Ljungby and Lagan with a 10 kilometer asphalted bicycle path where it connects with the bicycle route Sverigeleden. The west-eastern embankment is part of the 250 kilometer long bike trail Banvallsleden.

== Business and education ==
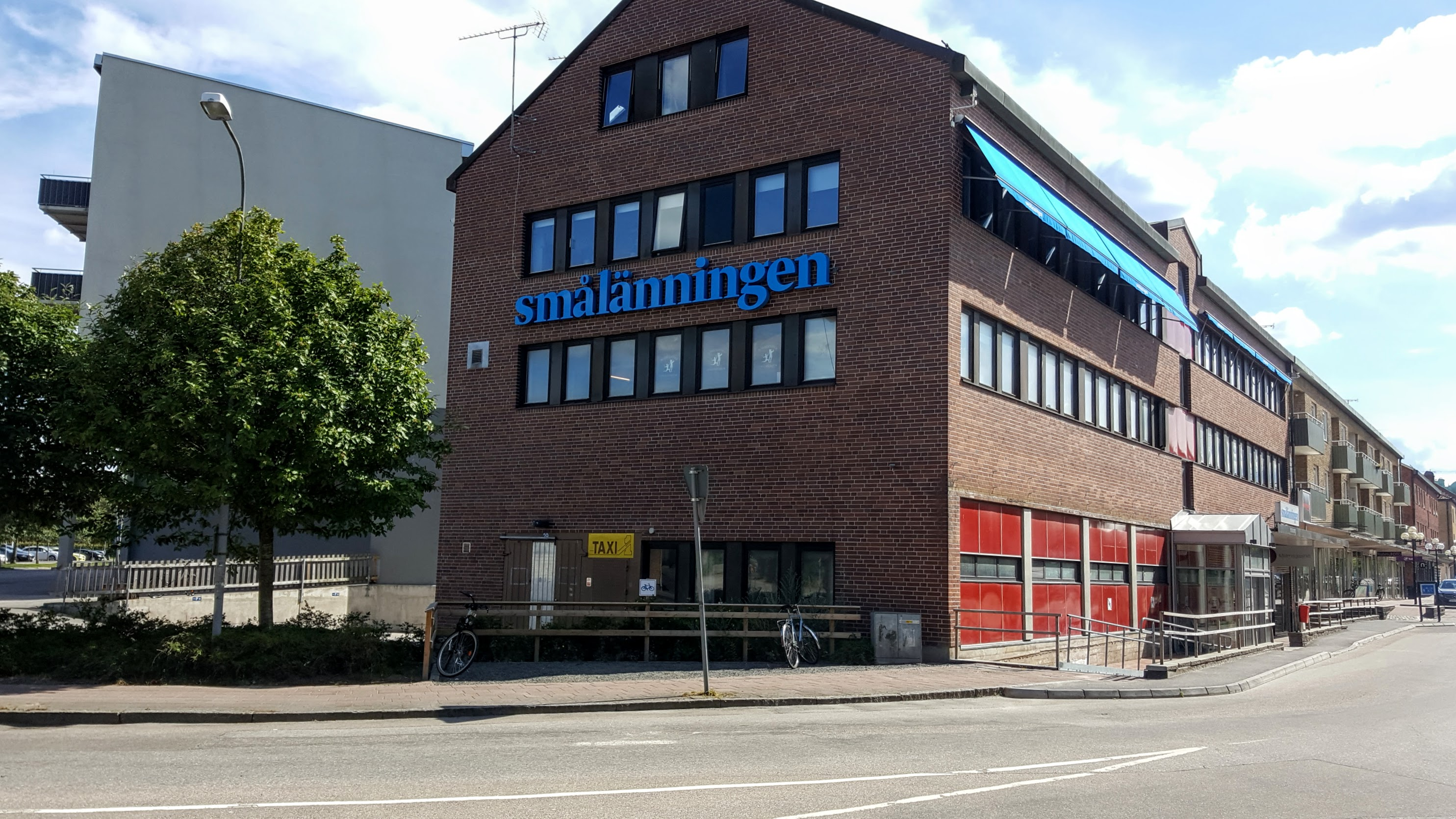
The regional paper Smålänningen's head office in central Ljungby.

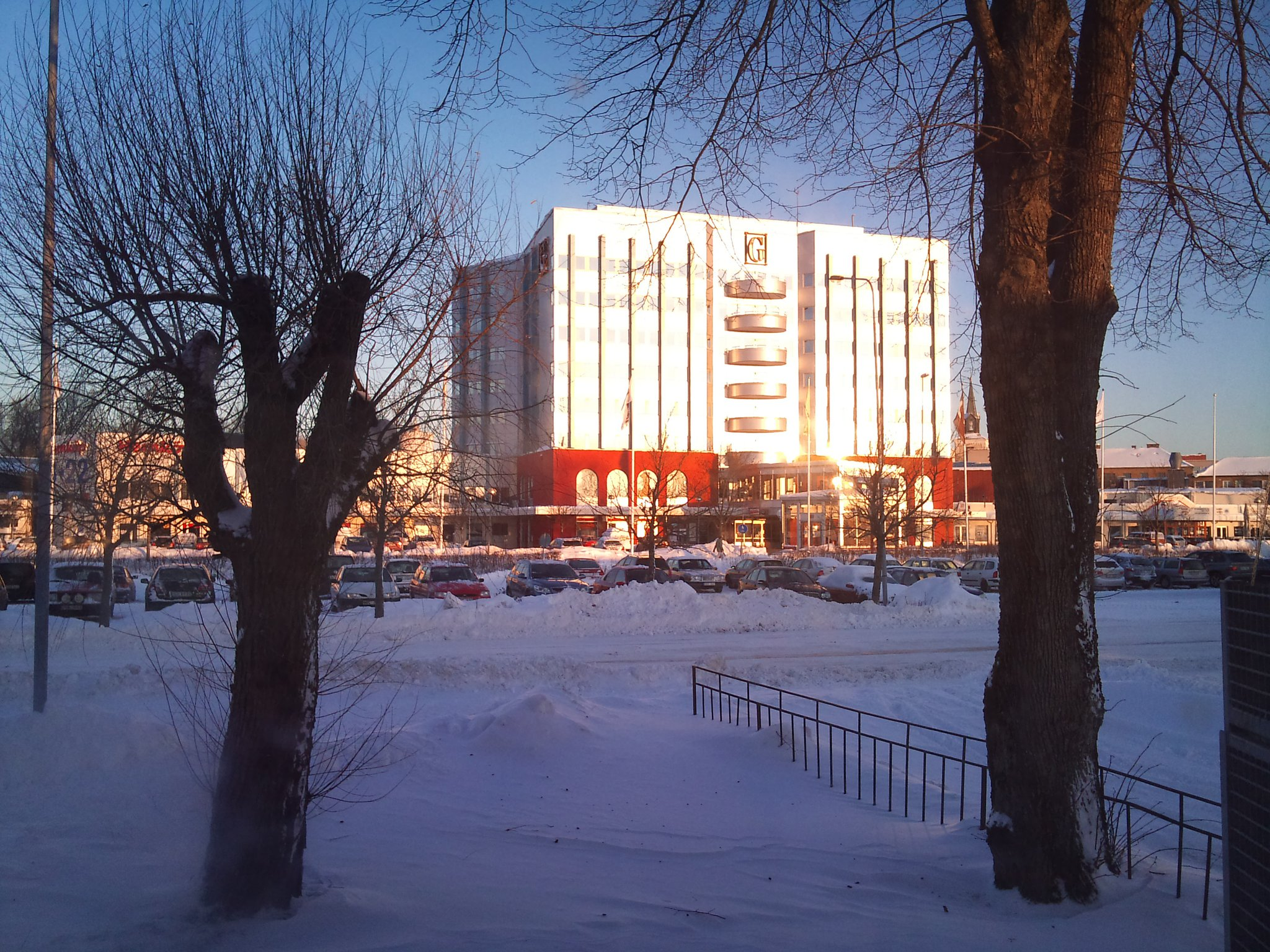
Högskolecentrum Ljungby has its premises on the second floor of the building "Garvaren".

Among the industries in Ljungby there are Svetruck, Electrolux Laundry Systems, Strålfors, Ljungby Maskin, CTC Enertech, HP Tronic and LL-Skogsmaskiner. Ljungby is also home to the daily regional newspaper Smålänningen. There are also several smaller and niche companies located in Ljungby.

The Ljungby library was designed by Jan Wallinder and finished construction in 1982.

=== Gymnasium ===
There are two gymnasiums in Ljungby municipality; Sunnerbogymnasiet and Ryssbygymnasiet.

Sunnerbogymnasiet is the largest with about 1'300 students and offers education in Social Science, Natural Science, Engineering, Construction, Aesthetics, Handicraft, and Business and Administration.

Ryssbygymnasiet lies about 30 kilometers outside Ljungby in the small village Ryssby. It offers education in Hotel, restaurant and catering, Hunting and wildlife management, Nature and adventure tourism, and Forestry.

=== College ===
Since 2002 there is a small college in Ljungby, Centre for Information Logistic and Högskolecentrum Ljungby, in cooperation with Linnaeus University, Jönköping University, and Halmstad University. The college offers a variety of programs and courses in the three areas of information logistics, marketing and sales, and product development.

== Culture ==
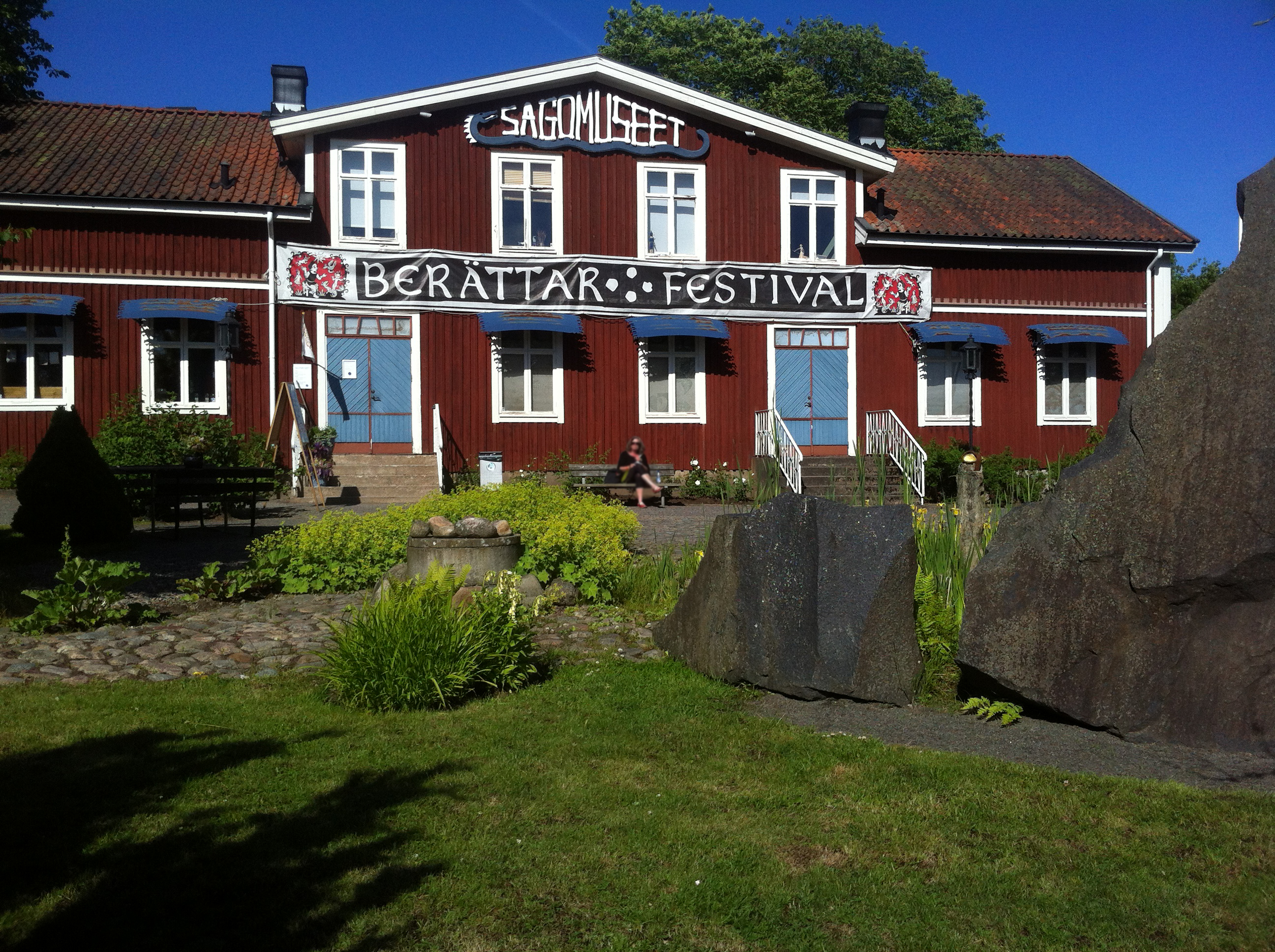
Museum of Legends, a small museum dedicated to oral storytelling, fairy tales and folklore.

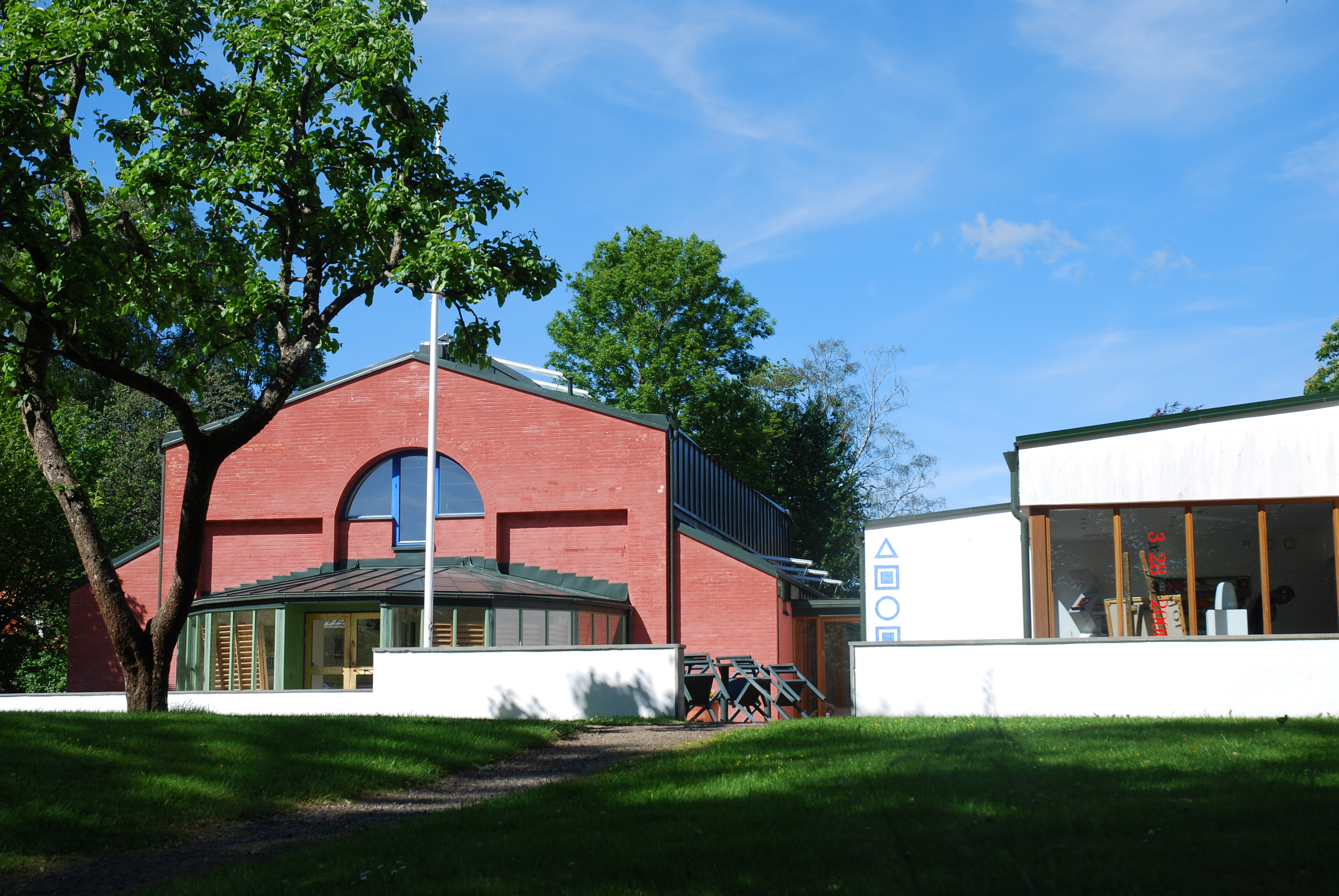
Kronoberg's museum of visual art, Ljungberg Museum, designed by Pontus Ljungberg.

Ljungby have been the home of several different cultural personalities. Among others, the cinematographer Gunnar Fischer and the writers Folke Fridell, Lennart Williams, and Sölve Rydell.

The Ljungberg Museum is since 2012 Kronoberg County's official museum of visual art. The museum's permanent exhibition feature Sven Ljungberg and Ann Margret Dahlquist-Ljungberg's artistic achievements. They do also have continuously special exhibitions with other major Swedish and Nordic artists.

The internationally renowned painter Erik Ortvad had his home during the second half of his life in Kvänjarp just outside Ljungby. The painter and sculptor Albert von Stockenström lived and died in Ljungby. Current painter Kenneth Sjöö live in Ljungby.

The Museum of Legends is a small museum dedicated to oral storytelling, fairy tales and folklore. The museum is run by the UNESCO accredited advisorStorytelling Network Kronoberg who also arrange the yearly Ljungby Storytelling Festival.

== Churches and religious communities ==
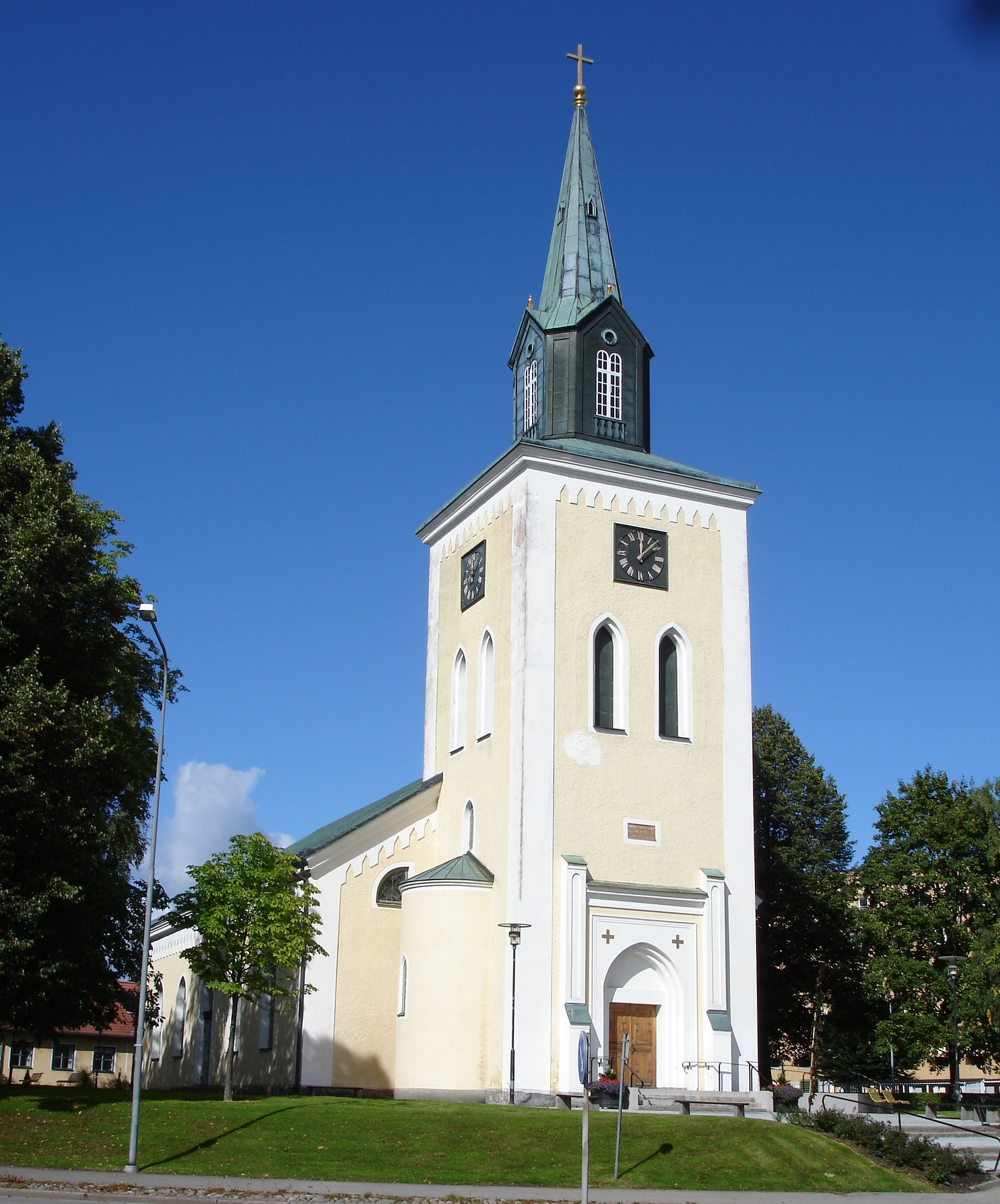
The exterior of Ljungby Church.

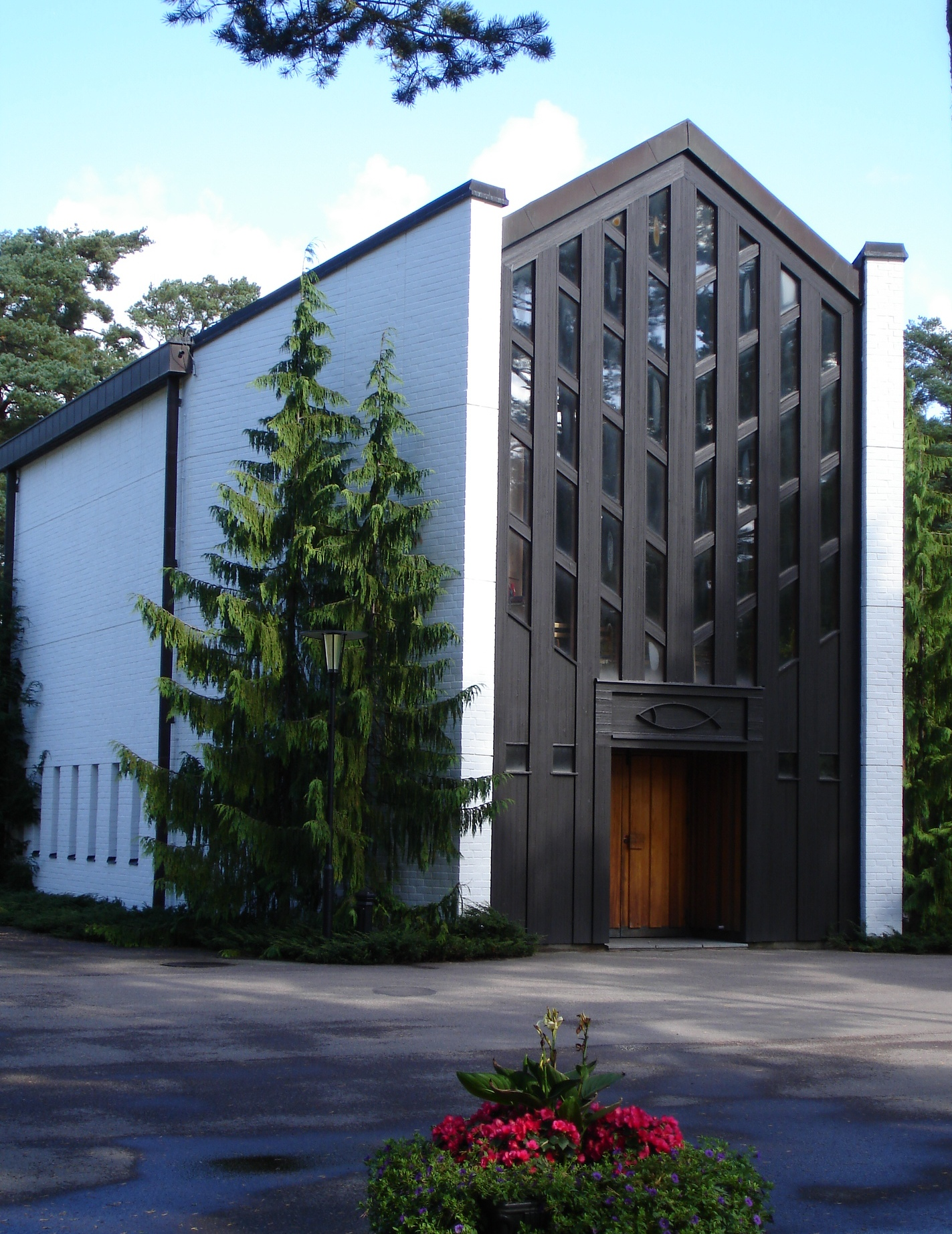
Annelundkyrkan located at Skogskyrkogården cemetery.

=== Church of Sweden ===
==== Ljungby församling ====
Ljungby assembly belongs to Ljungby parish in the diocese of Växjö. The congregation was formed in the Middle Ages with their first stone church being built in the 12th century. Ljungby assembly's current church, Ljungby Church, was built between 1858–1859 and inaugurated on 8 September 1861 by Bishop Henrik Gustaf Hultman.

The newly built church had a bit of an austere interior, with the only inventory from the old demolished stone church being the middle aged baptismal font and the 18th century longcase clock. The church does however have a few recent artistic embellishments. One of the most eye-catching objects being the gilded altarpiece by Sven Ljungberg featuring Christ's way on via Dolorosa.

==== Ljungby Maria Församling ====
Ljungby Maria assembly belongs to Ljungby parish. The assembly was created when Ljungby assembly was split in 2002. The church Mariakyrkan was designed by architect Agneta Holmqvist and opened in 2001 to be the new assembly's main church.

==== Annelundkyrkan ====
Annelundkyrkan operates as the district church for Ljungby's Annelund district and as a funeral church as it is located at the Skogskyrkogården cemetery. The church was designed by county architect Hans Lindén and opened on 2 July 1972. The church is decorated by Åke Wremp and woodcarver Eva Spångberg. The church does also have a rich mural by Sven Ljungberg.

=== Other ===
Churches and communities that belongs to other religious communities:

- Pingstkyrkan i Ljungby
- Betelkyrkan EFK
- Missionskyrkan
- Sankt Stefans katolska kapell
- Markuskyrkan, LBK
- Allianskyrkan

== Sport ==
The most well-known sports clubs of Ljungby are the ice hockey club IF Troja/Ljungby, the soccer club Ljungby IF, and the volleyball club Ljungby VBK

== Famous people from Ljungby ==
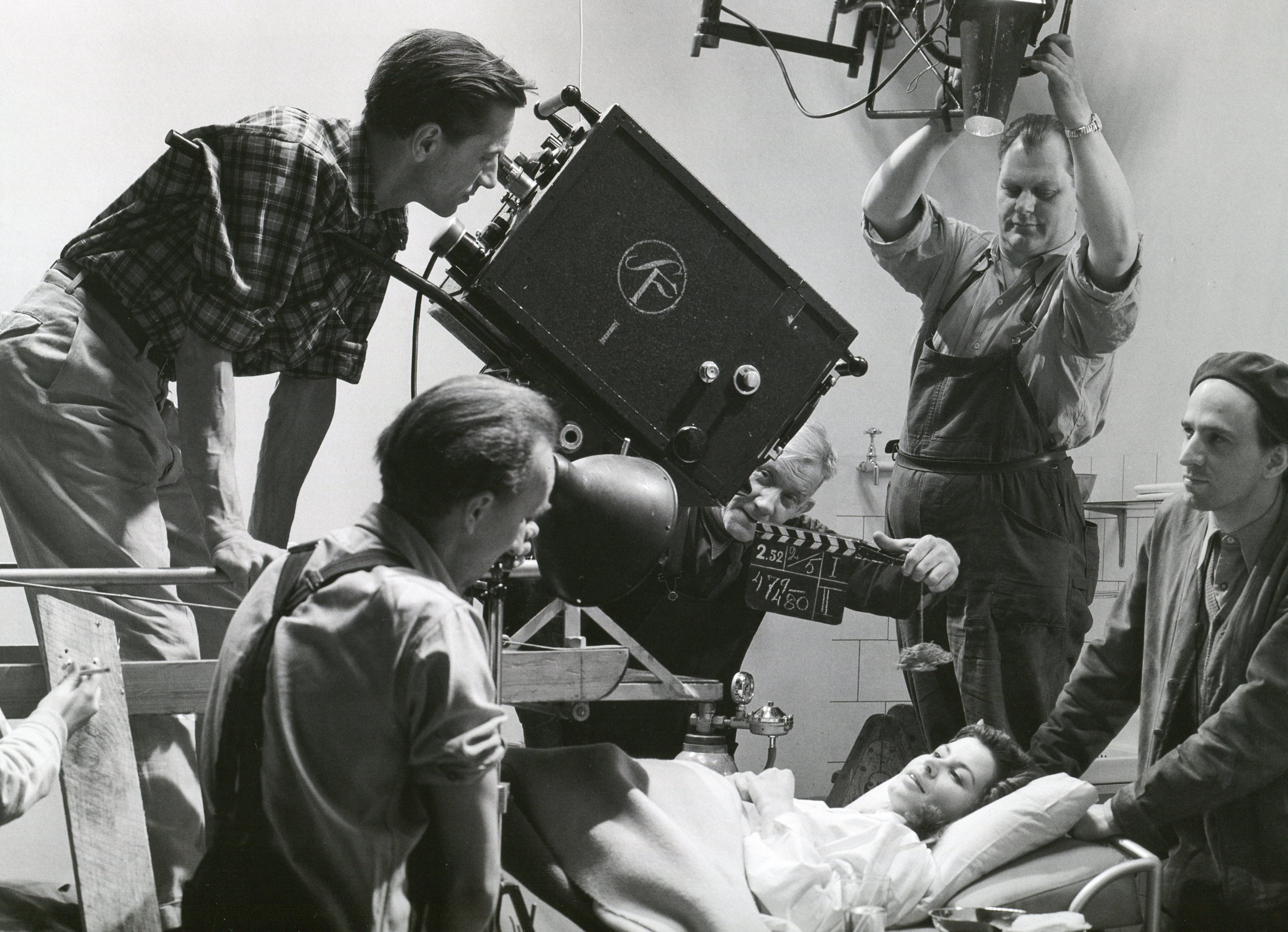
The cinematographer Gunnar Fischer (Operating the camera) was born in Ljungby.

- Bengt Harding Olson, prosecutor and politician (fp)
- Eskil Erlandsson, MP, and Minister for Rural Affairs (c)
- Ingvar Kamprad, active in Elmtaryd, business leader, founder of IKEA
- Märta Ljungberg, innkeeper and donor
- Rune B. Johansson, MP and Minister of the Interior (s)
- Vera Sandberg, Sweden's first female engineer

=== Art and Culture ===
- Folke Fridell, Berga parish; proletarian writer
- Gunnar Fischer, cinematographer, director, and writer
- Sven Ljungberg, painter, graphic artist, professor, and writer
- Margareta Strömstedt, journalist

=== Sport ===
- Emil Krafth, soccer player for Newcastle United of the English Premier League
- Jacob Larsson, ice hockey player for the Anaheim Ducks of the NHL
- Linus Johansson, ice hockey player for HC Sochi of the KHL
- Mattias Nilsson, ice hockey player for the Sparta Warriors of the GET-ligaen
- Mattias Weinhandl, former professional ice hockey player
- Oscar Fantenberg, ice hockey player for the Vancouver Canucks of the NHL
- Pierre Engvall, ice hockey player for the New York Islanders of the NHL
- Rade Prica, former professional soccer player
- Roger Johansson, former professional ice hockey player

== Demographic ==
Ljungby population
City	Population
1920	1,397
1940	5,354
1960	8,750
1965	10,727(22,6%)
1970	12,596(17,4%)
1975	12,969(3,0%)
1980	13,667(5,4%)
1990	14,192(3,8%)
1995	14,480(2,0%)
2000	14,485(0,0%)
2005	14,810(2,2%)
2010	15,205(2,7%)
2015	15,785(3,8%)
Source: 1920 1940 SCB Tätorter 1960-2005

== Climate ==
Ljungby has a transitional maritime (Cfb) and humid continental climate (Dfb) influenced by its inland position, with large temperature differences between seasons. Most winter precipitation is cold rain, an effect of mild weather being associated with low pressure systems arriving from the North Sea in a westerly direction. Summers have some of the strongest hypothetical heat potential in Sweden, being inland at a low latitude. However, the same type of westerlies often bring in moist and cool air instead leading to clouds, convection and heavy rainfall. Being at 150 metres (490 ft) above sea level also cools down afternoons year round. This renders seaside locations on the west coast having similar summer afternoon temperatures as Ljungby. The high variability is notable, with warm and cool July months differing about 8 °C (14 °F) for daytime temperatures. Winter means may differ more than 10 °C (18 °F) between different years.

Climate data for Ljungby 2002–2021 averages (extremes since 1962)
Month	Jan	Feb	Mar	Apr	May	Jun	Jul	Aug	Sep	Oct	Nov	Dec	Year
Record high °C (°F)	9.8 (49.6)	15.3 (59.5)	20.3 (68.5)	28.0 (82.4)	29.5 (85.1)	35.0 (95.0)	33.5 (92.3)	34.2 (93.6)	27.4 (81.3)	23.1 (73.6)	15.5 (59.9)	11.7 (53.1)	35.0 (95.0)
Mean maximum °C (°F)	6.7 (44.1)	8.4 (47.1)	13.7 (56.7)	20.2 (68.4)	25.3 (77.5)	27.7 (81.9)	29.0 (84.2)	27.8 (82.0)	23.3 (73.9)	16.8 (62.2)	11.3 (52.3)	7.9 (46.2)	30.2 (86.4)
Mean daily maximum °C (°F)	1.2 (34.2)	1.9 (35.4)	6.0 (42.8)	12.4 (54.3)	17.2 (63.0)	20.7 (69.3)	22.5 (72.5)	21.3 (70.3)	17.4 (63.3)	11.0 (51.8)	6.0 (42.8)	2.8 (37.0)	11.7 (53.1)
Daily mean °C (°F)	−1.3 (29.7)	−1.0 (30.2)	1.7 (35.1)	6.3 (43.3)	11.0 (51.8)	14.6 (58.3)	16.7 (62.1)	15.8 (60.4)	13.3 (55.9)	7.3 (45.1)	3.6 (38.5)	0.4 (32.7)	7.4 (45.3)
Mean daily minimum °C (°F)	−3.8 (25.2)	−3.9 (25.0)	−2.7 (27.1)	0.2 (32.4)	4.7 (40.5)	8.4 (47.1)	10.9 (51.6)	10.3 (50.5)	7.2 (45.0)	3.5 (38.3)	1.2 (34.2)	−2.0 (28.4)	2.8 (37.1)
Mean minimum °C (°F)	−16.0 (3.2)	−13.7 (7.3)	−11.7 (10.9)	−6.6 (20.1)	−2.9 (26.8)	1.8 (35.2)	5.2 (41.4)	3.6 (38.5)	−0.9 (30.4)	−5.8 (21.6)	−8.3 (17.1)	−12.2 (10.0)	−18.4 (−1.1)
Record low °C (°F)	−27.4 (−17.3)	−27.3 (−17.1)	−27.9 (−18.2)	−16.5 (2.3)	−5.6 (21.9)	−2.9 (26.8)	1.3 (34.3)	−0.7 (30.7)	−6.7 (19.9)	−14.0 (6.8)	−19.0 (−2.2)	−27.0 (−16.6)	−27.9 (−18.2)
Average precipitation mm (inches)	57.1 (2.25)	48.3 (1.90)	40.8 (1.61)	31.2 (1.23)	62.7 (2.47)	71.9 (2.83)	96.3 (3.79)	81.3 (3.20)	59.7 (2.35)	81.1 (3.19)	65.8 (2.59)	63.6 (2.50)	759.8 (29.91)
Source 1: SMHI Open Data for Ljungby A, temperature
Source 2: SMHI Open Data for Ljungby A, precipitation
