= Ljungberg Museum =

Coordinates: 56°49′48.10″N 13°56′25.25″E

- Ljungbergmuseet
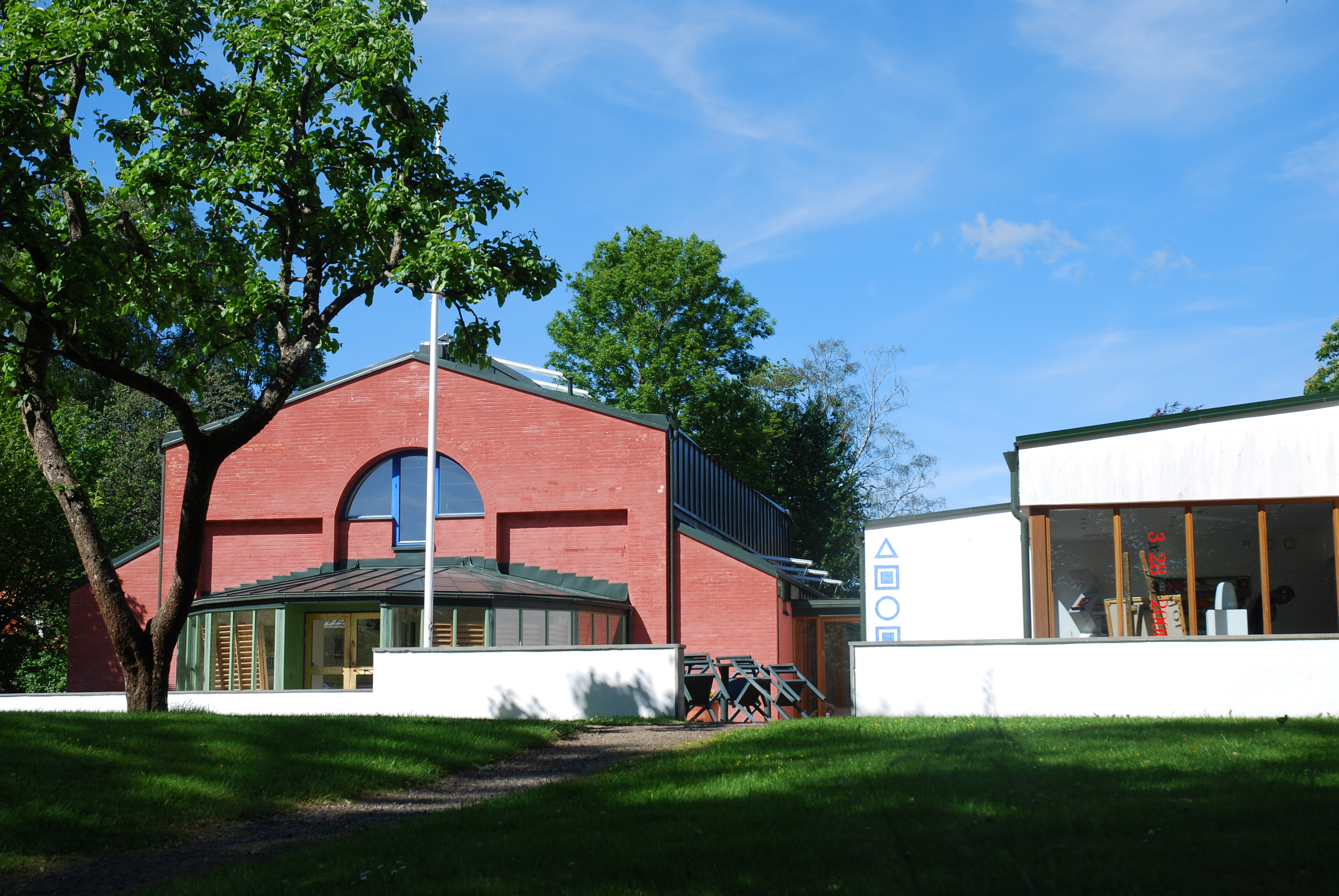
- Established: September 24, 1990
- Location: Ljungby, Sweden
- Type: Art museums
- Founders: Sven Ljungberg; Ann Margret Dahlquist-Ljungberg
- Architect: Pontus Ljungberg
- Owner: Sven och Ann Margret Ljungbergs Stiftelse
- Website: ljungbergmuseet.se

Ljungberg Museum (Swedish: Ljungbergmuseet) is a museum located in Ljungby, Sweden, and is Kronoberg County's official museum of visual art.

The museum is located in Ljungby city center next to the former home and atelier of Sven Ljungberg (1913–2010) and Ann Margret Dahlquist-Ljungberg (1942-2002). Some of the permanent exhibitions are dedicated to their works. The museum was designed by their son, architect Pontus Ljungberg, and was built in stages between 1990 and 2002.

The foundation Sven och Ann Margret Ljungbergs Stiftelse was created in 1989 with the purpose of constructing a picture warehouse, but the idea was soon transformed into a museum instead. The museum was inaugurated by the then current minister of culture Bengt Göransson. In 2012 it became the official visual art museum for Kronoberg County.
