= Sagomuseet =

Folklore museum in Ljungby, Sweden

The Museum of Legends
- Sagomuseet
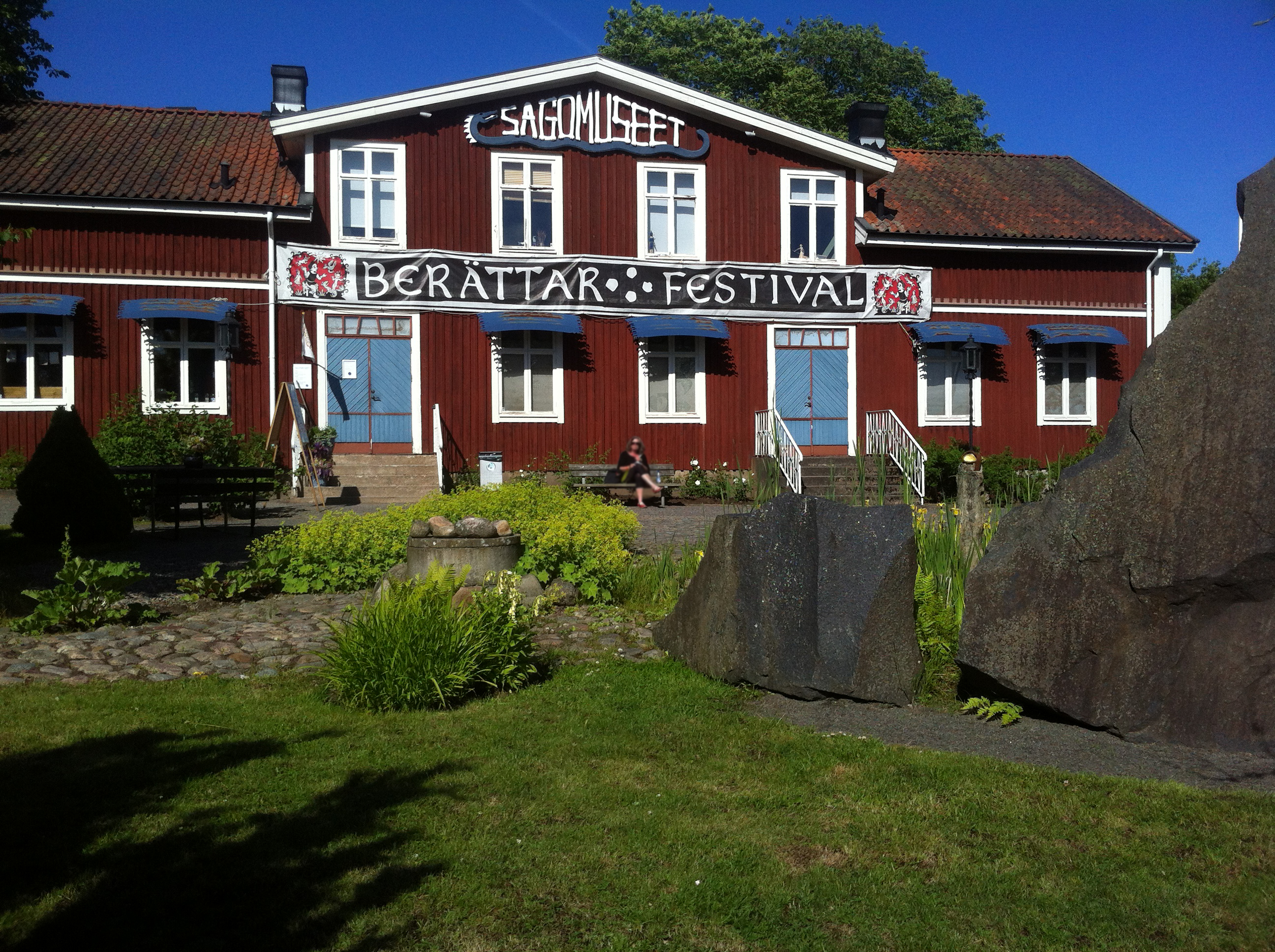
- The Museum of Legends in Ljungby, promoting the upcoming Storytelling Festival.

- Location in Kronoberg Sagomuseet (Sweden)
- Location: Märta Ljungbergsvägen 1, Ljugnby, Sweden
- Coordinates: 56°50′00.71″N 13°55′59.36″E
- Type: Folklore, Oral storytelling
- Executive director: Meg Nömgård
- Owner: Sagobygden
- Public transit access: Ljungby Terminal (250 meters)
- Website: English website

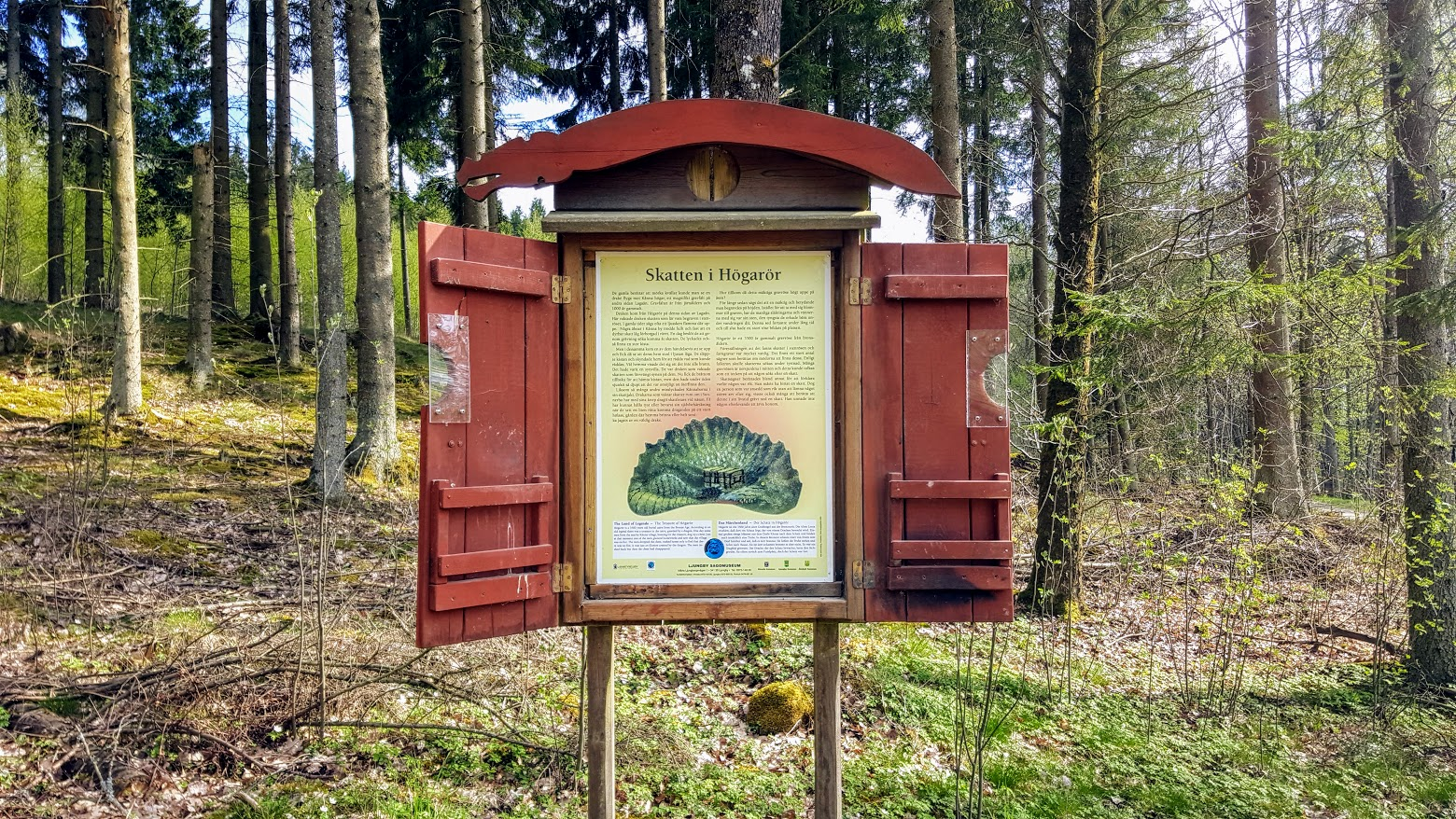
One of the information boards about legendary places. This particular one is about The Treasure of Högarör.

The Museum of Legends, or Sagomuseet in Swedish, is a museum in Ljungby, Sweden, for oral narration, fairy tales, and folklore. The museum is operated by the UNESCO Accredited Advisor and non-profit association Sagobygden that protects the oral narrative and contributes to the continuation of the oral narrative traditions. Together with the Storytelling Network Kronoberg they also arrange the Storytelling Festival in Ljungby. In March 2017 the Government of Sweden nominated Sagobygden, the operator of the Museum of Legends, to UNESCO's register of good examples on the preservation of intangible heritage.

While the museum itself offer a condensed experience of the regional folklore, the Storytelling Network Kronoberg maintain several legendary places around Kronoberg.
