= Smålänningen =

Local newspaper in Kronoberg county, Sweden

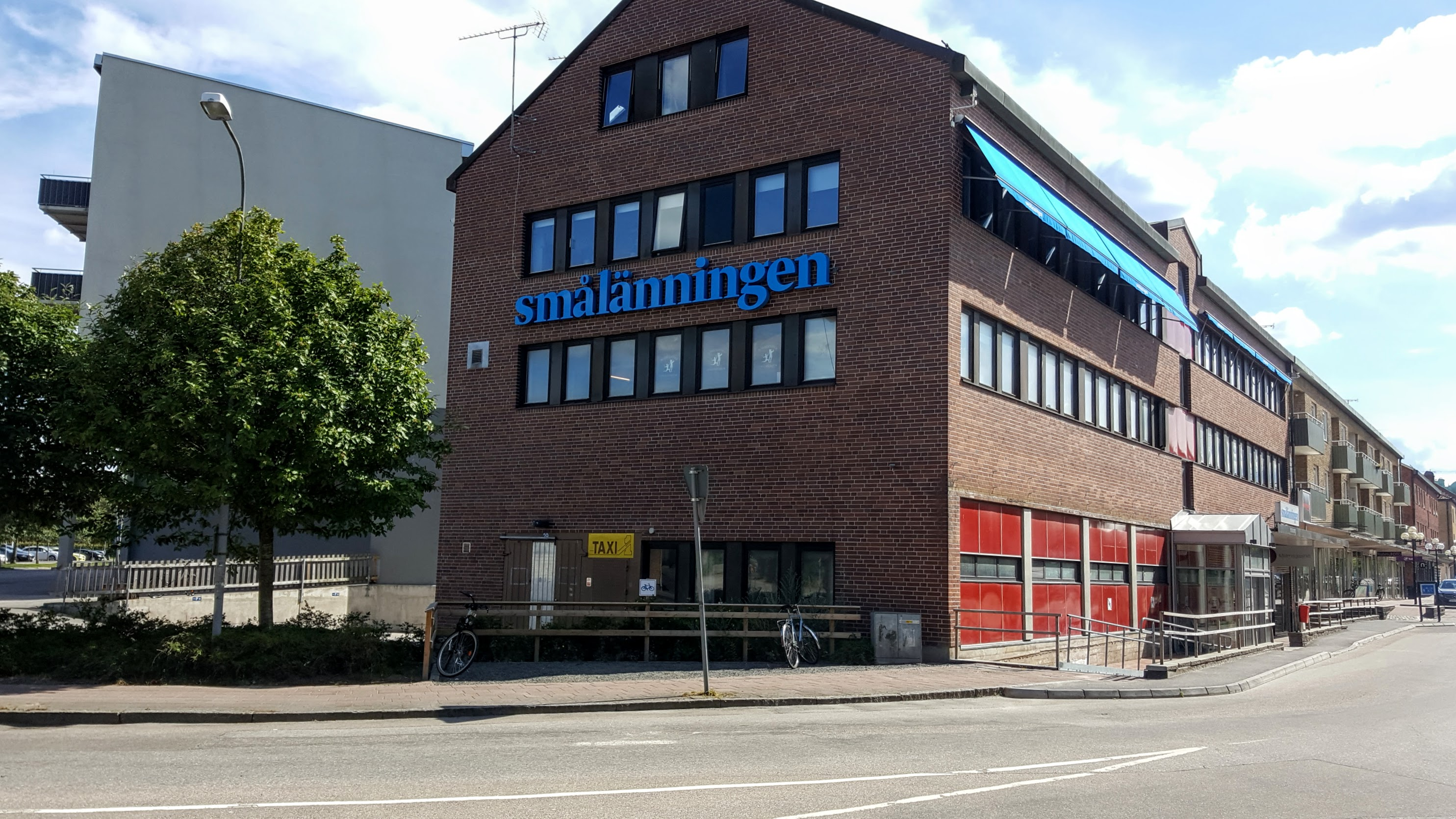
- Smålänningen's head office
- Type: Triweekly
- Owner: Hallpressen AB
- Founder: Elfrid Dürango
- Managing editor: Inger Abram Ohlsson
- General manager: Mats Tidstrand
- News editor: Anna Lilliequist
- Founded: 6 December 1921; 104 years ago
- Language: Swedish
- Headquarters: Ljungby, Sweden
- City: Ljungby; Markaryd; Älmhult
- Circulation: 12 200
- Readership: 34 000
- OCLC number: 941099494
- Website: Smalanningen.se

Smålänningen is a newspaper which is published three days a week (Monday, Wednesday and Friday) in Kronoberg County and mainly covers news in Ljungby, Markaryd, and Älmhult. The newspaper's head office is located in Ljungby, with local offices in Markaryd and Älmhult. The newspaper was founded in 1921 in Ljungby by Elfrid Dürango. The first edition was published on 6 December 1921. Since 1969 Smålänningen is a part of Hallpress. Smålänningen has a circulation of 12 200 and 34 000 readers.

In 2022, it was announced that it would only be printed in paper form three times a week rather than five.
