= John Lundqvist =

Swedish sculptor

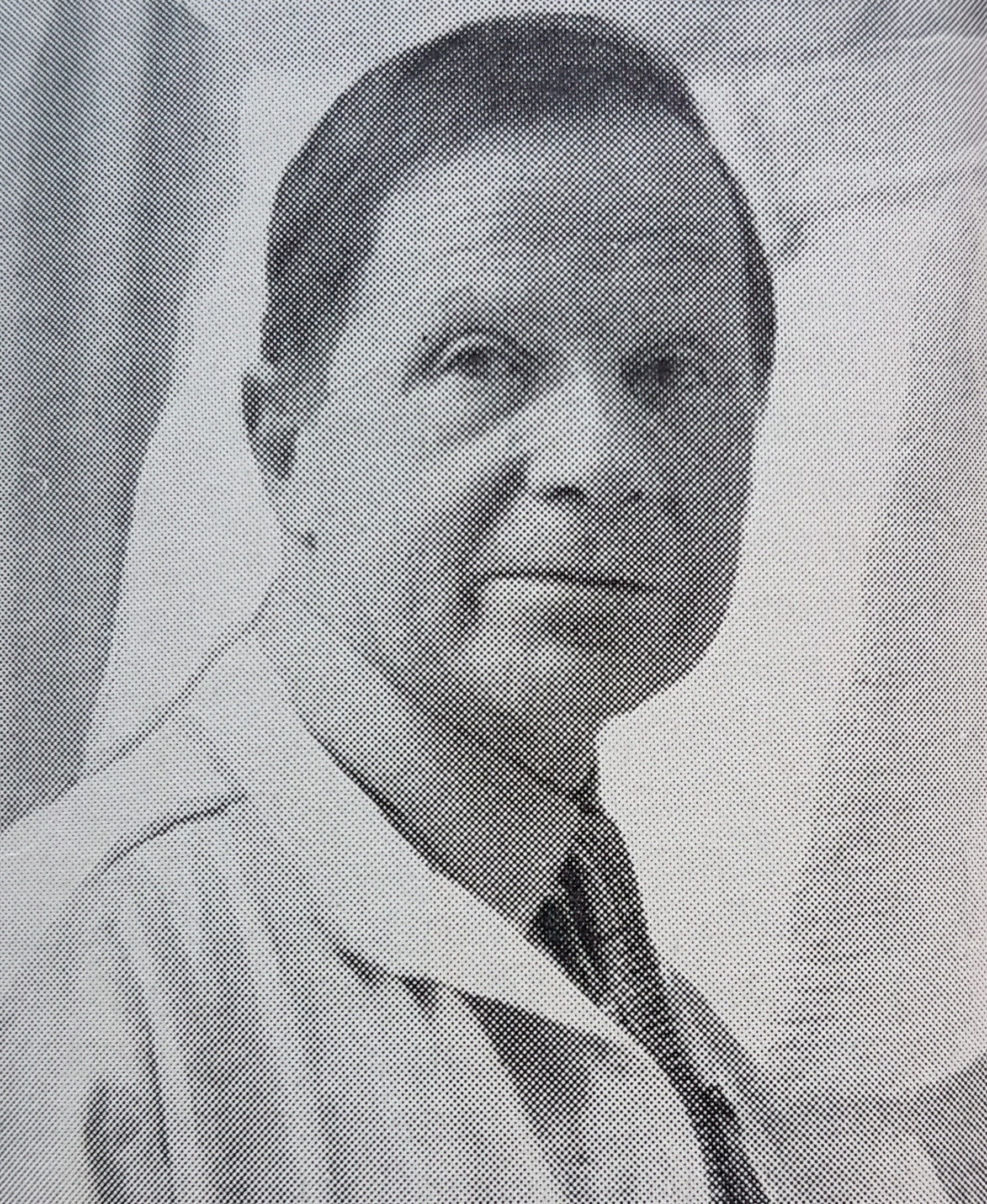
- Born: Johan Anders Lundqvist; 2 October 1882; Stockholm, Sweden
- Died: 2 June 1972 (aged 89)
- Resting place: Skogskyrkogården, Stockholm
- Education: Tekniska skolan, Académie Colarossi

Johan (John) Anders Lundqvist (2 October 1882 – 2 June 1972) was a Swedish sculptor.

== Life and works ==
John Lundqvist first studied at Tekniska Skolan (today Konstfack) and was thereafter assistant to Christian Eriksson between 1907 and 1913. In 1913, he studied at Académie Colarossi in Paris where Auguste Rodin made an impression on him. In the years 1919–1927, he lived in Paris. He advanced his education in Copenhagen and Italy.

His works were characterized by a deeply religious way of life. His inspiration is collected from French sculptor Auguste Rodin and gothic sculptures, but there are also clear similarities to Carl Milles. John Lundqvist mainly devoted himself to church decorations, such as Uppståndelsemonumentet by Heliga Korsets kapell at Skogskyrkogården in Stockholm, Sweden. Lundqvist have also made the crucifix's gilded Christ figure.

Other famous works include Uppståndelsen (at Nationalmuseum) and Orfeus, pilot studies of Uppståndelsemonumentet, the crucifix at the Swedish church in Paris (1926), Job, Två människorI (1923), and the fountain composition Forskarlen (1933, for Laholm municipality).

John Lundqvist is represented at, among other, Moderna Museet, National Museum of Fine Arts, and Kalmar art museum. His work was also part of the sculpture event in the art competition at the 1932 Summer Olympics.

== Gallery ==
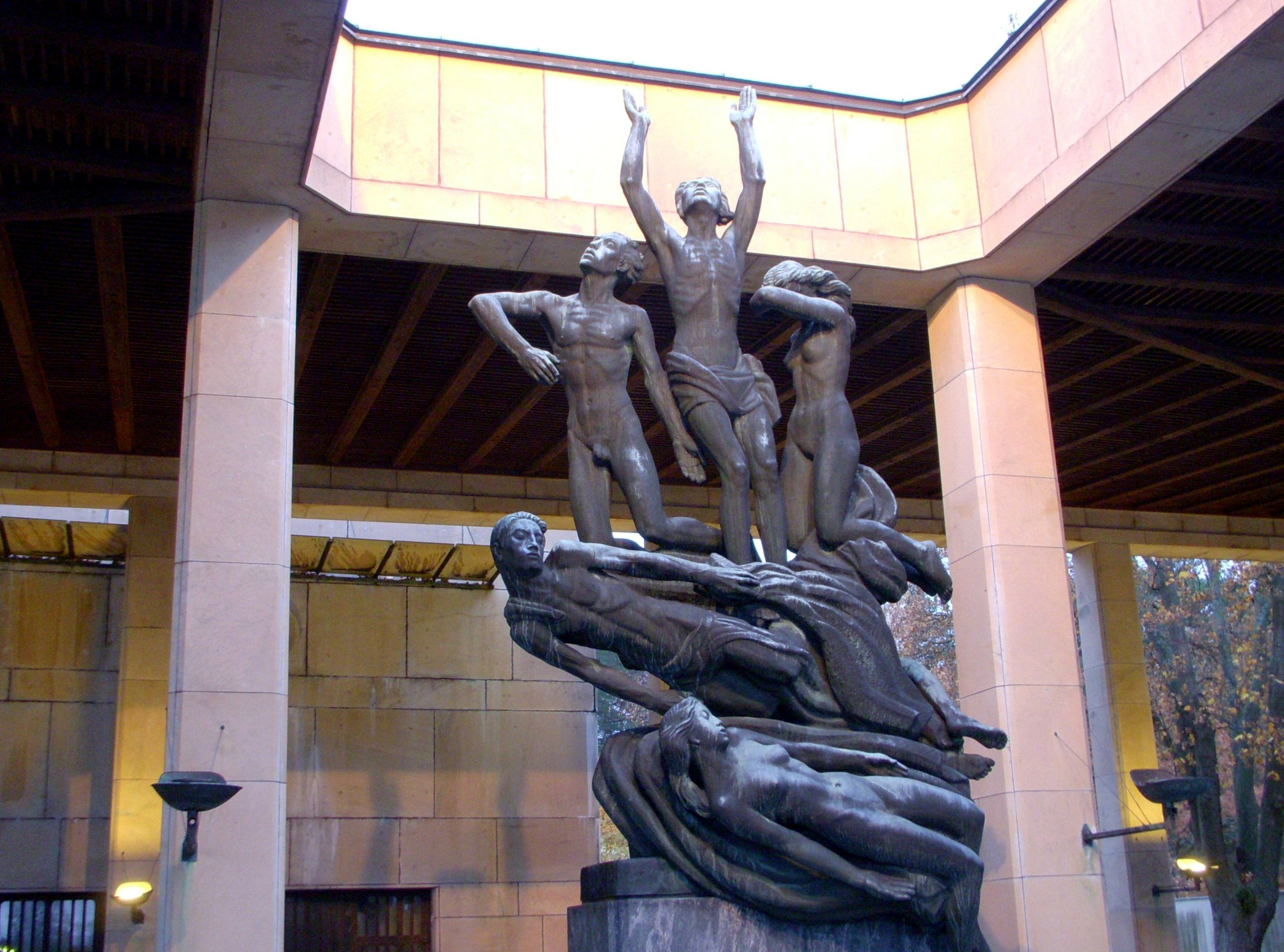
Uppståndelsemonumentet at Skogskyrkogården i Stockholm

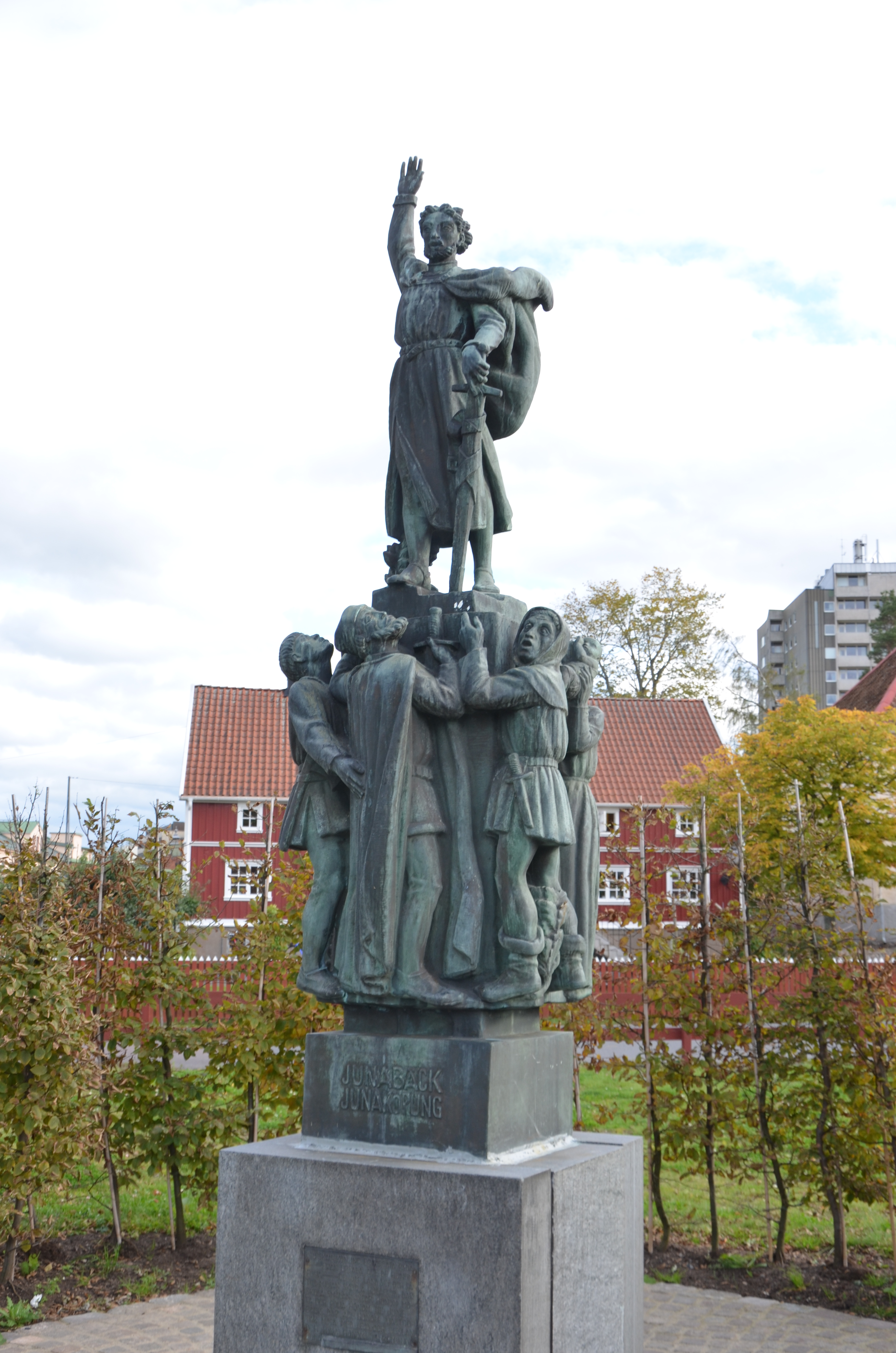
Junebäcksmonumentet in Jönköping

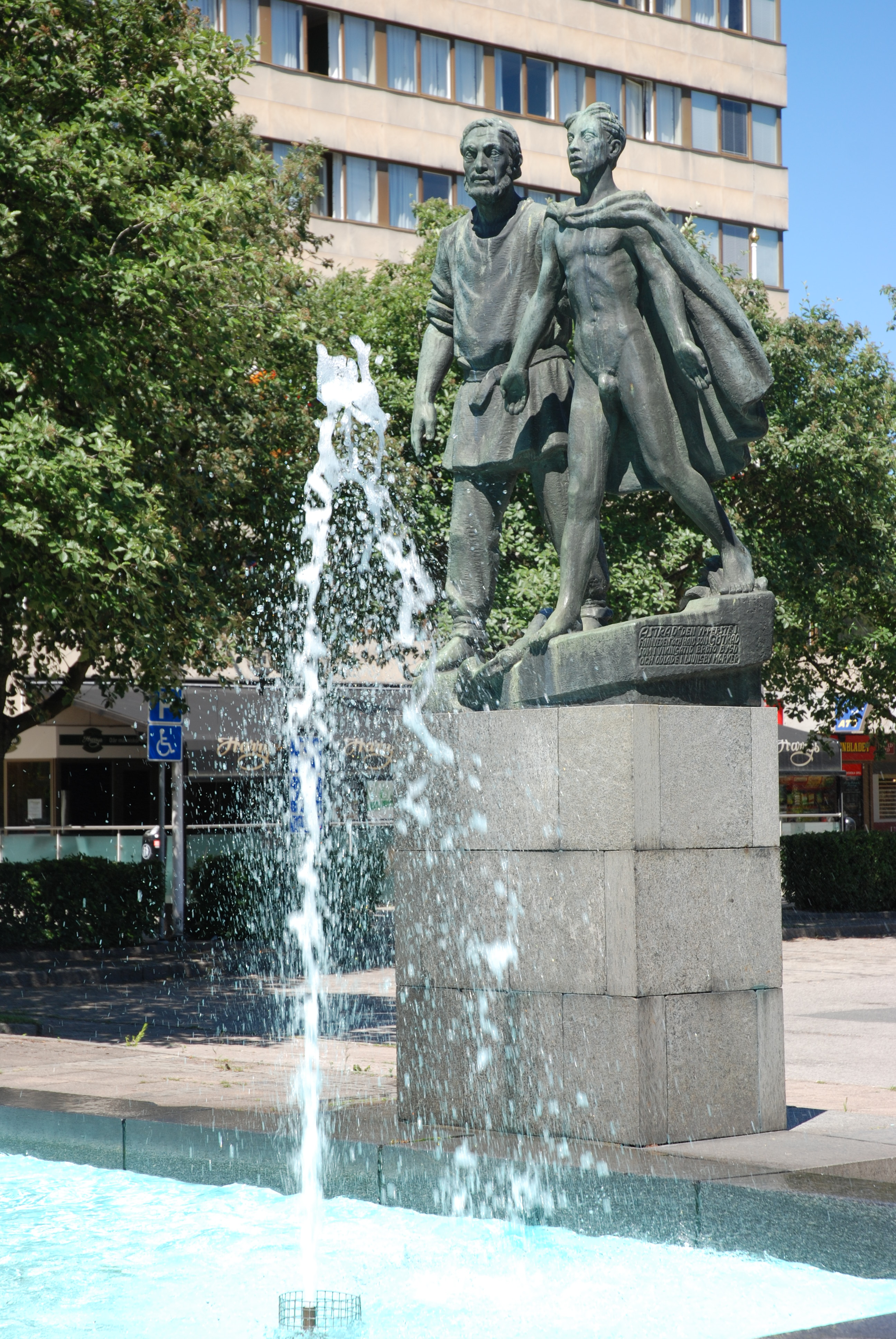
Astrad och Götrad in Ljungby

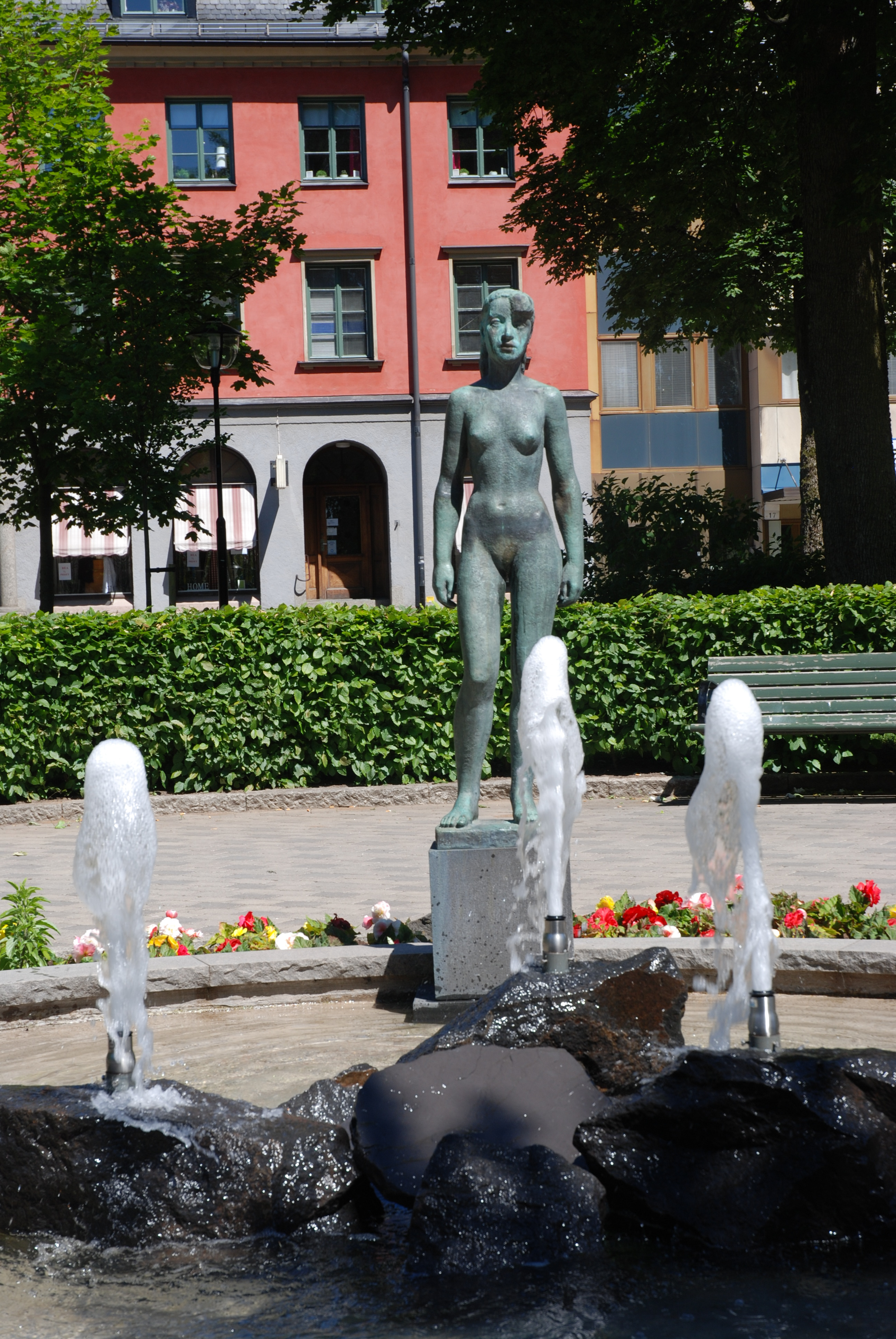
Ungdom in Ljungby

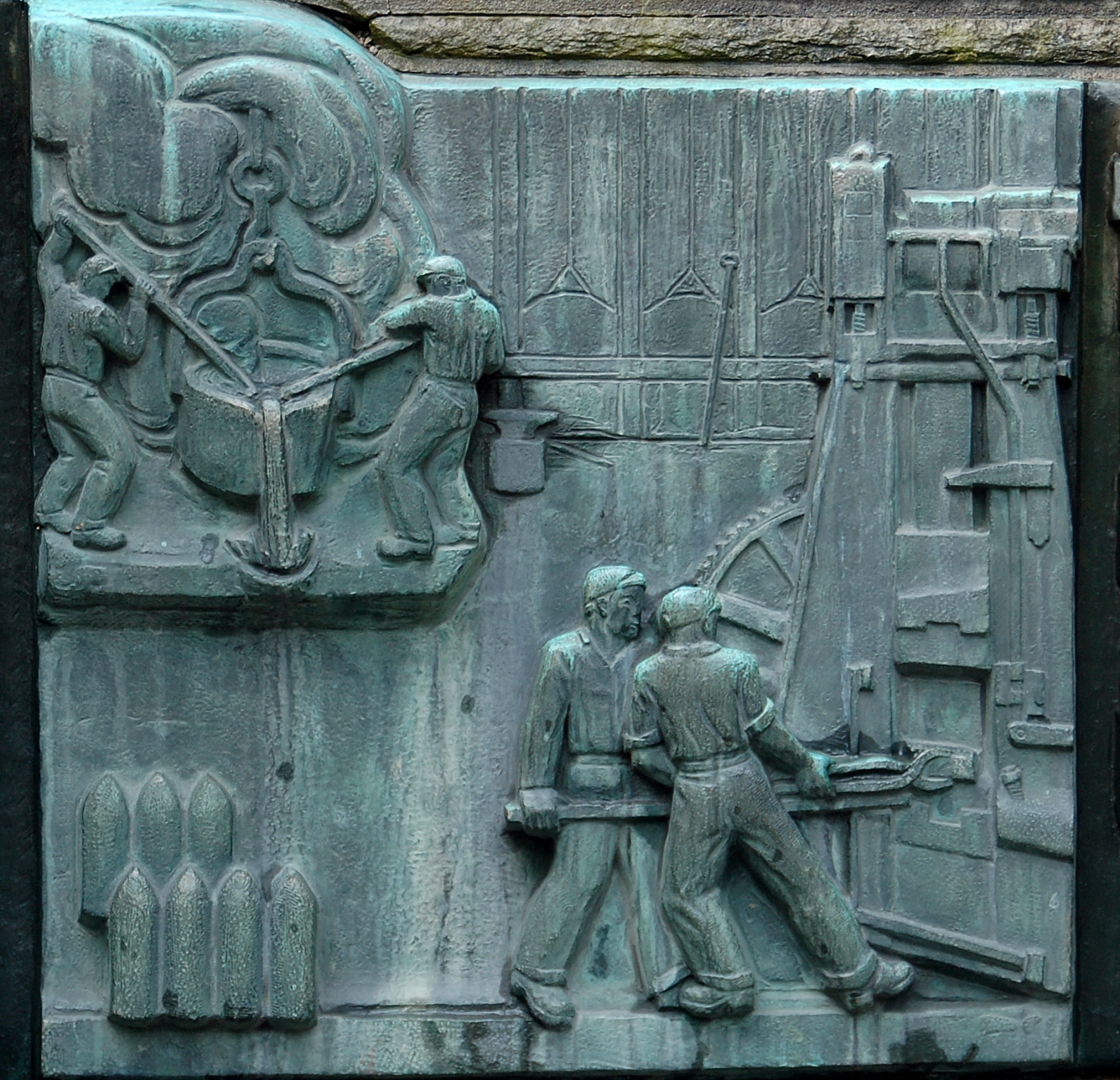
Part of Boforsmonumentet in Karlskoga

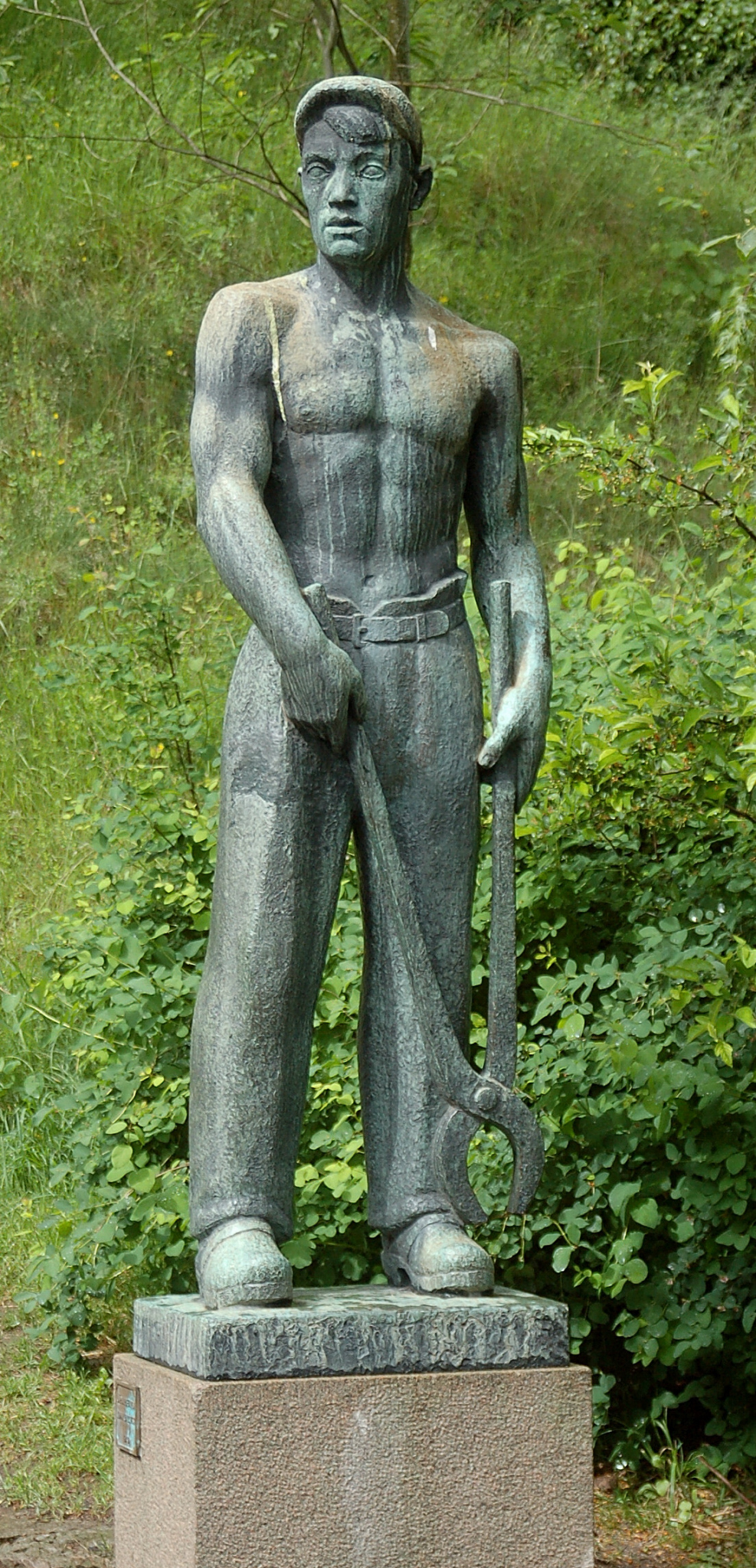
Järnarbetaren in Karlskoga

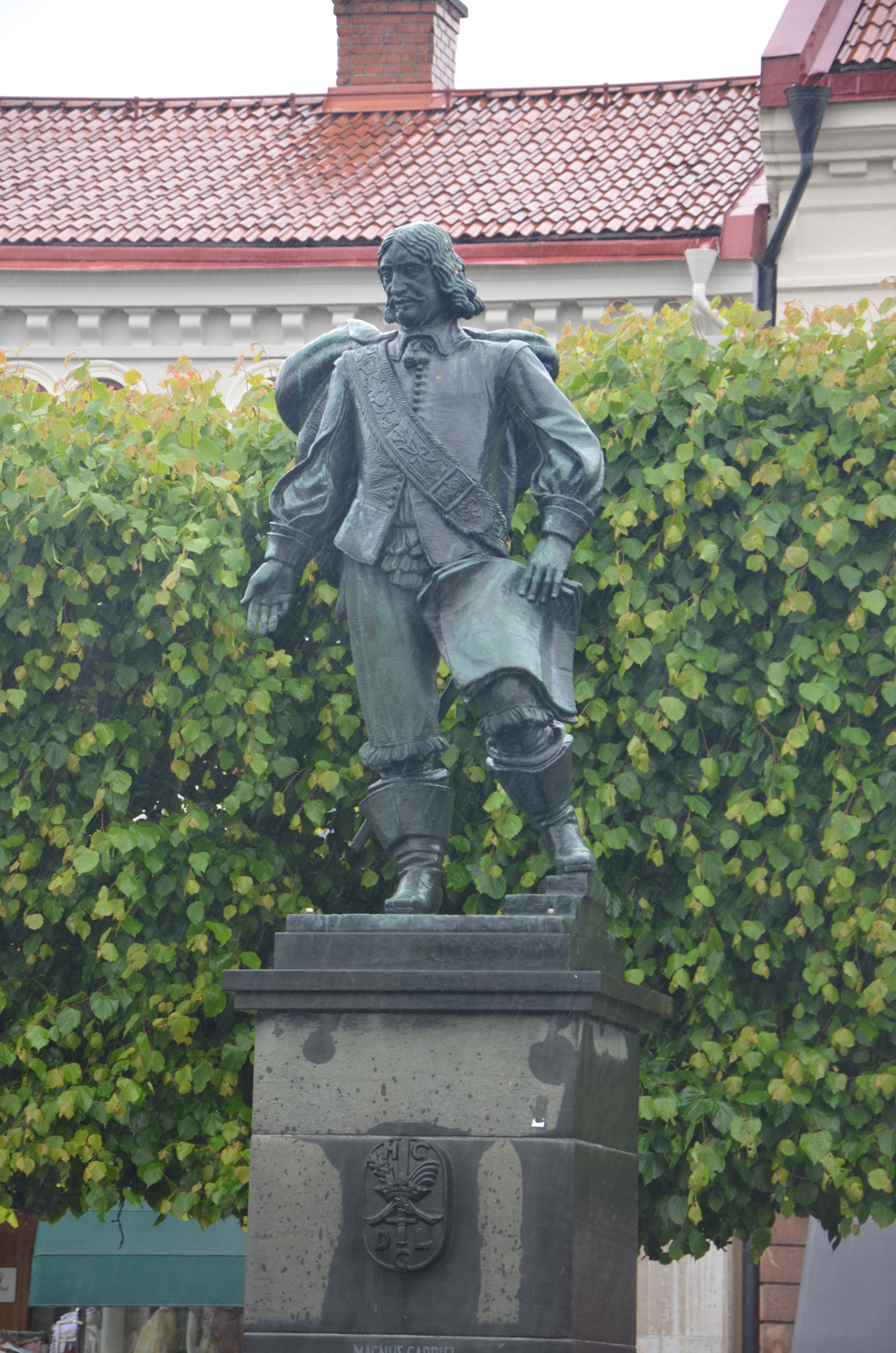
Magnus Gabriel De la Gardie, part of De la Gardiebrunnen in Lidköping

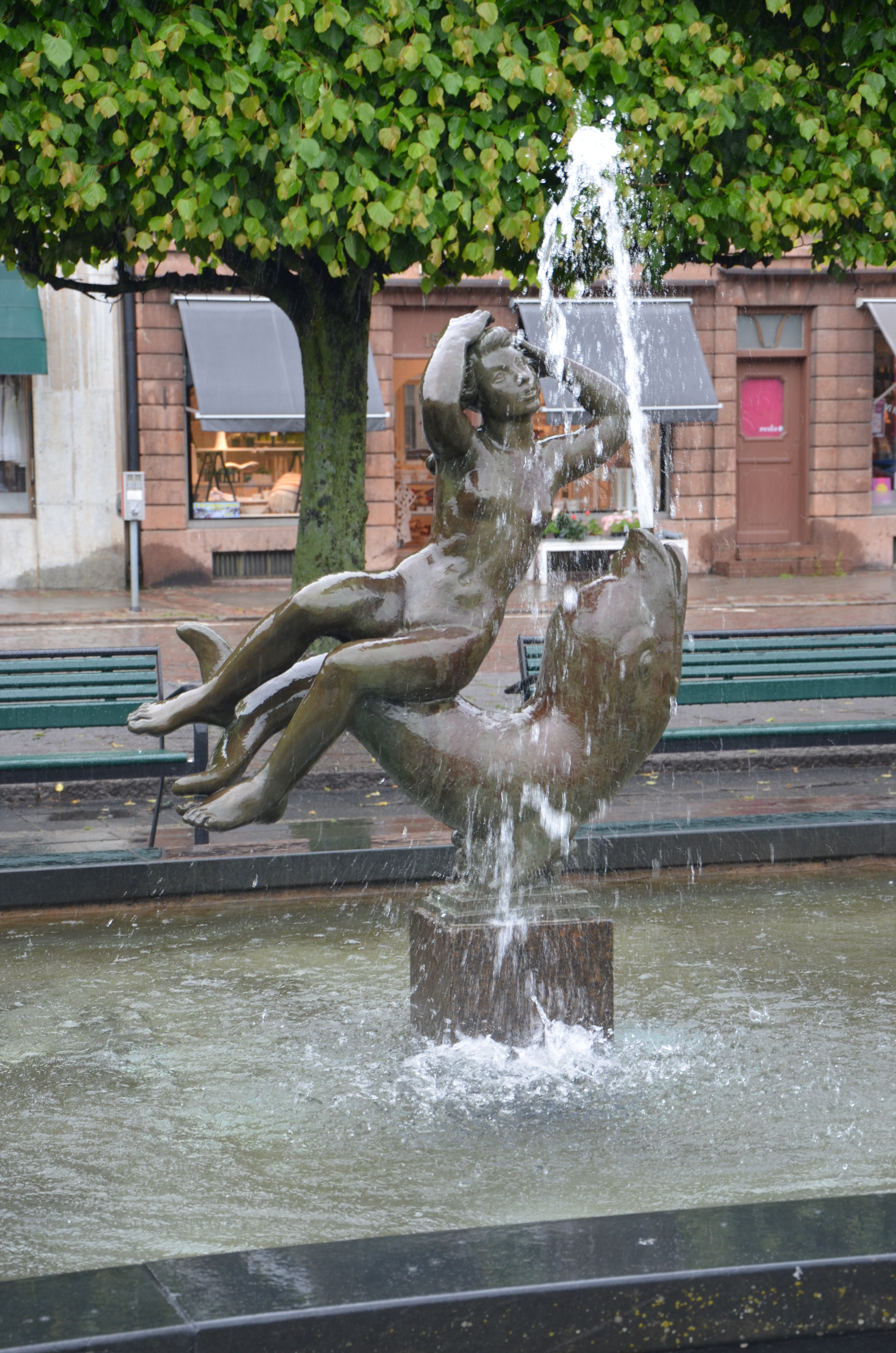
Part of De la Gardiebrunnen in Lidköping

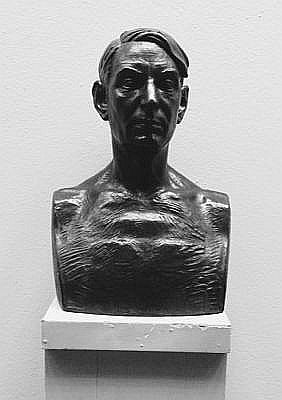
Yngve Larsson in Stockholm City Hall

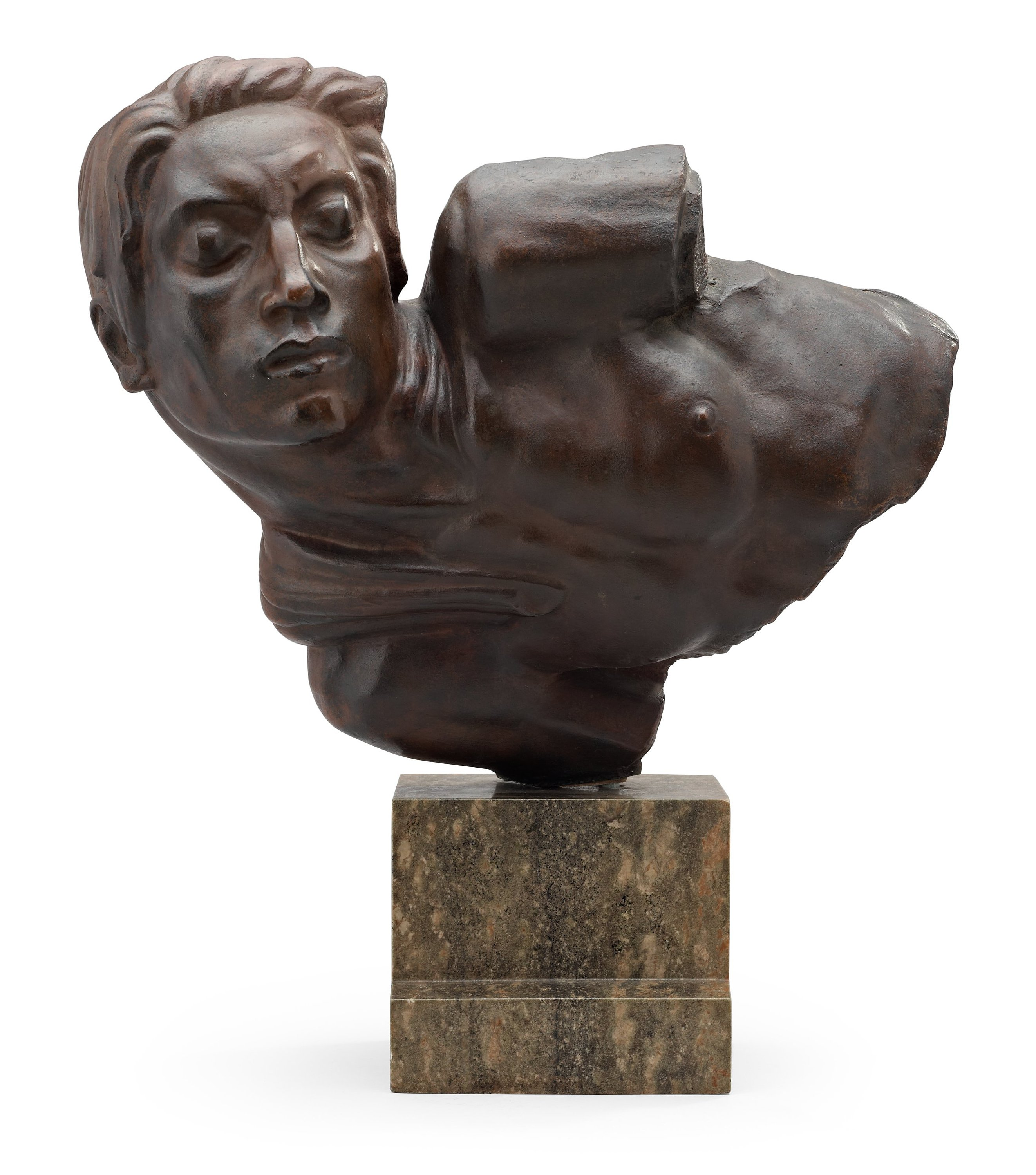
Detailed studie of Uppståndelsemonumentet
