= Garth Youngberg =

American writer

- Occupation: Non-fiction writer

Academic background
- Education: University of Illinois

Ivan Garth Youngberg was the founder and director of the Institute for Alternative Agriculture.

== Life and work ==
He graduated from the University of Illinois with a PhD in Political Science in 1971. He taught at Southwest Missouri State University, where he was chairman of the Political Science department until 1981. He was a member of the United States Department of Agriculture (USDA) Study Team for Organic Farming, and Organic Resources Coordinator, for the USDA. He lost his job during the Ronald Reagan administration transition. He was a specialist with the Maryland Environmental Service. He supported the Organic Farming Research Foundation.

== Awards ==
- 1988 MacArthur Fellows Program

== Works ==
- Alternative Farming Systems and Rural Communities: Exploring the Connections: Symposium Proceedings, Editors Garth Youngberg, Neill Schaller, Henry A. Wallace Center for Agriculture & Environmental Policy at Winrock International, 1992, ISBN 978-1-893182-02-8
- "Sustainable Agriculture: An Overview", Sustainable agriculture in temperate zones, Editors Charles A. Francis, Cornelia Butler Flora, Larry D. King, Wiley-Interscience, 1990, ISBN 978-0-471-62227-7
- "Policy Considerations for a Sustainable Agriculture", Sustainable Agriculture in California: Proceedings of a Research Symposium, Sacramento, California, March 15–16, 1990, Editor David Chaney, ANR Publications, 1991, ISBN 978-1-879906-02-0
- Understanding the True Cost of Food: Considerations for a Sustainable Food System: Symposium Proceedings, Editors Garth Youngberg, Otto Doering, Henry A. Wallace Center for Agriculture & Environmental Policy at Winrock International, 1991, ISBN 978-1-893182-14-1
- Biotechnology in Agriculture: Implications for Sustainability: Symposium Proceedings, Henry A. Wallace Center for Agriculture & Environmental Policy at Winrock International, 1986, ISBN 978-1-893182-03-5
- "The Alternative Agricultural Movement", Policy Studies Journal, Volume 6 Issue 4, Pages 524 - 530
- Federal administration and participatory democracy: the ASCS farmer committee system, Volume 1971, Part 1, University of Illinois at Urbana-Champaign, 1971
- John F. Kennedy's views on presidential power, Western Illinois University, 1966
