= Sven Ljungberg =

Swedish artist (1913–2010)

Professor Sven Ljungberg
- Born: Sven Birger Ljungberg; 15 December 1913; Ljungby, Sweden
- Died: July 28, 2010 (aged 96); San Benedetto del Tronto, Italy
- Education: University of Arts, Crafts and Design, Stockholm (1932-1934); Royal Institute of Art, Stockholm (1934-1939)
- Occupations: Royal Institute of Art (Director 1972-1978) (Rector 1978-1981)
- Years active: 1931-2010
- Title: Professor's name (1980)
- Board member of: Académie des Beaux-Arts
- Spouse: Ann Margret Dahlquist-Ljungberg (1942-2002)
- Children: Pontus Ljungberg
- Parent(s): Elof Ljungberg; Blända Sjöberg
- Relatives: Sigge Ljungberg (brother)
- Awards: Prince Eugen Medal (1976)

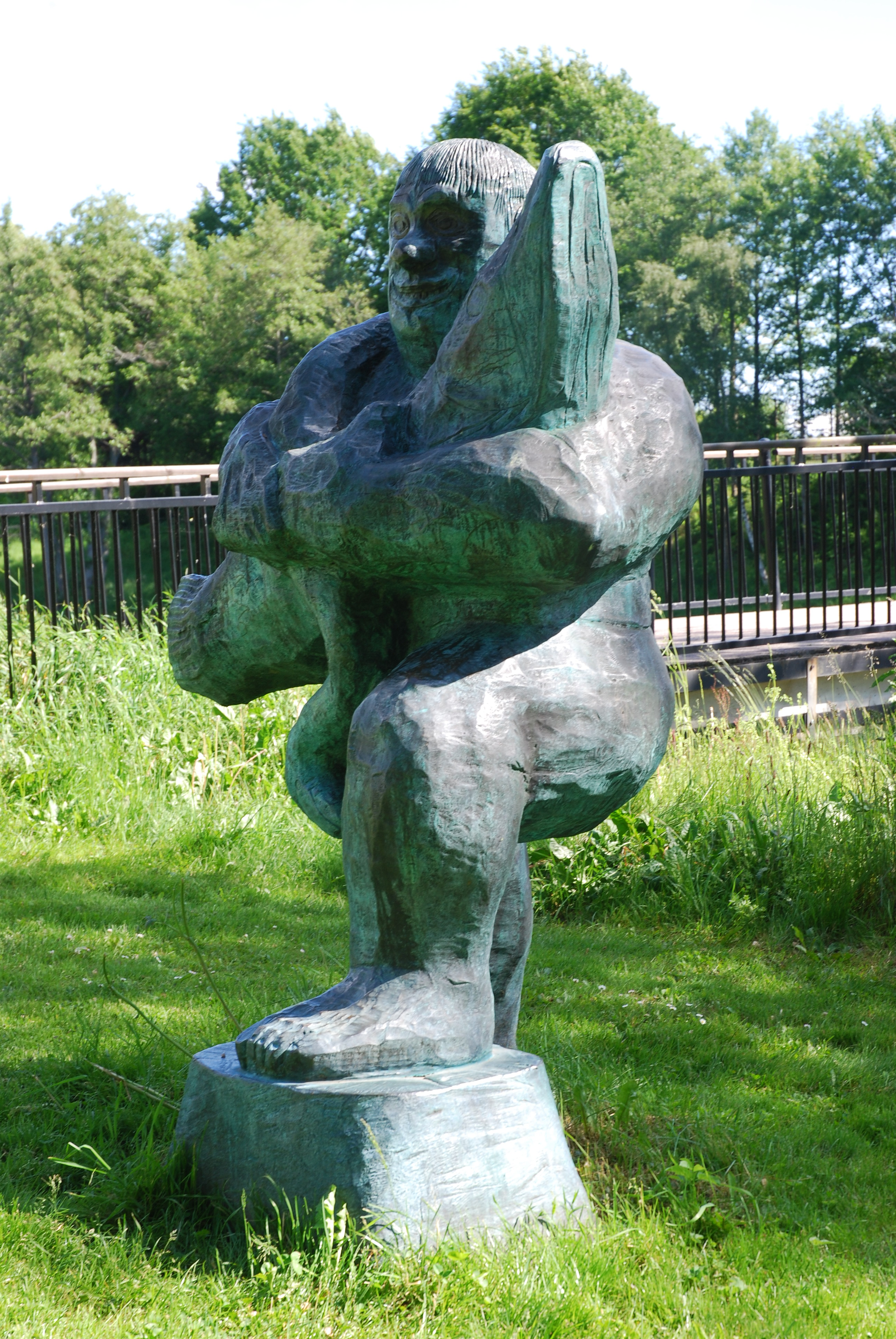
Ågubben ("The River Man") by Ljungberg, at Lagan (Sweden) in Ljungby.

Sven Birger Ljungberg (December 15, 1913 – July 28, 2010) was a Swedish visual artist whose work was created predominantly in the genres of printmaking and painting, though his entire body of his work includes murals and mosaics. He was born in Ljungby, Sweden.

== Biography ==
Small-town life in Sweden, specifically in Småland, located in the central southern part of Sweden, serves as the major theme in his work. His hometown of Ljungby, located in Småland, is specifically referenced throughout his work.

His work is included in both the Moderna museet and Nationalmuseum in Stockholm, as well as museums in Växjö, Kalmar, and Jönköping. The village of Ljungby has also erected a museum, Ljungbergmuseet, to house his works.

In addition to his larger work, Ljungberg has also created illustrations for several books, including many books by Ivar Lo-Johansson.

Ljungberg served as director of Konsthögskolan (Royal University College of Fine Arts) in Stockholm between 1972 and 1978 and subsequently as the school's rector from 1978 to 1981. It was within this timeframe, 1977–1981, that Ljungberg held the distinguished honor of creating the certificates for the winners of the Nobel Prize in Physics, Chemistry, and Economics.

He was married to artist Ann Margret Dahlquist-Ljungberg, with whom he had a son, Pontus Ljungberg, also an artist. Ljungberg died on July 28, 2010.
