= Ljungby library =

Library in Ljungby, Sweden

- Ljungby bibliotek
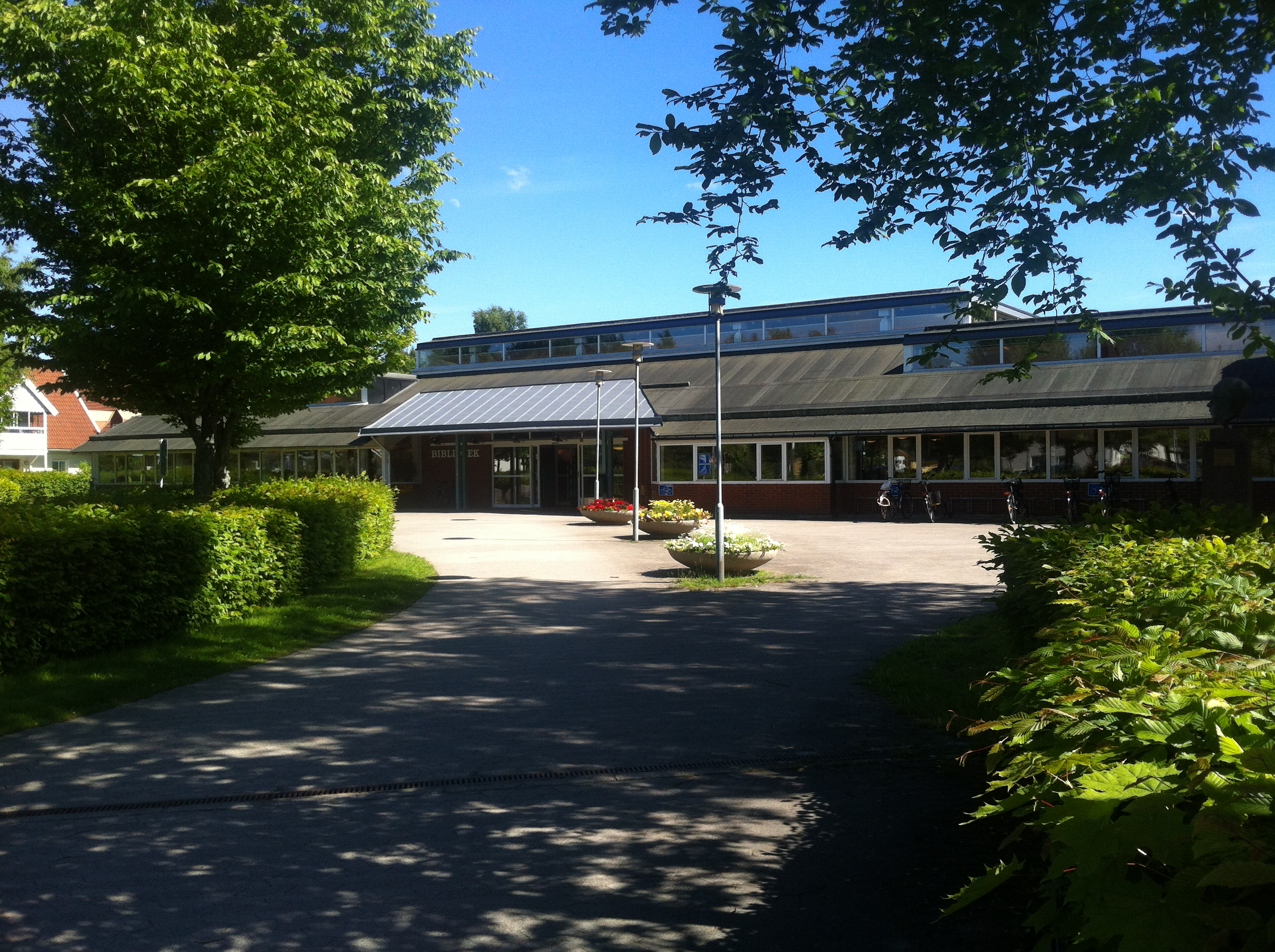
- 56.8329°N 13.9478°E
- Location: Ljungby, Sweden, Sweden
- Type: Public library
- Established: October 1920; 105 years ago
- Architect: Jan Wallinder
- Branches: 4 (Lagan, Ryssby, Lidhult, mobile library)

Collection
- Items collected: Books, journals, newspapers, magazines, sound and music recordings, and media.

Access and use
- Circulation: 224,000 (2017)
- Population served: 28,500 (2018)

Other information
- Director: Lina Holmér
- Employees: 18
- Website: https://bibliotek.ljungby.se/web/arena

Ljungby library (Swedish: Ljungby bibliotek), is a library in Ljungby, Sweden, that opened in 1982. It was designed by architect Jan Wallinder and has an interior designed by Rolf and Margareta Åberg. It is visited daily by 500 to 800 patrons and is 3,030 square metres (32,600 sq ft) in size. The library also houses a small café plus an attached art gallery, which also can serve as lecture hall.

== History ==
It is unknown when Ljungby got its first library. There should have been a parish library sometime between 1860 and 1870, but no traces of this have been found. The only known parish library in current Ljungby municipality was in Ryssby.

=== Three room plus kitchen at Storgatan (1920–1928) ===
At the start of the 20th century there were several smaller libraries in Ljungby, with varying access for the public.

Ljungby folkbibliotek (Eng: "Ljungby public library") opened in October 1920 with the creation of its statutes. The library was located in the municipal meeting room and was open every Saturday between two and half-past two. It was managed by the chairman of the library board rector Gustav Strömvall and librarian head teacher Algot Björkman.

Ljungby köpings bibliotek (Eng: Ljungby market town's library) had its own premises at Vinkelhaken 4 on Storgatan street – a stone's throw away from the court house – that was rented already in 1921, but did not open until 1922. The apartment the library was located in had three rooms plus kitchen, with woodshed and access to the laundry room. The rent was 650 kronor per year. With the first governmental grant of 218 kronor and 94 öre they bought their first books on 1 October 1921. Their collection then consisted of 78 books and 23 newspapers. The library board consisted of first chairman häradshövding Nils Munck af Rosenschöld, first secretary folk school teacher Ernst Malmertz, and master baker Axel Johansson.
In 1921 there were five libraries in Ljungby: the two public libraries Ljungby köping and Ljungby folkbibliotek; two temperance libraries belonging to Logen 2876 Ljung of the Independent Order of Good Templars and Logen Finnveden of the Nationalgodtemplarorden; and a workers' library belonging to the ABF. Ernst Malmertz called the representatives from these libraries to a meeting regarding the possibilities of a merger. Logen 2876 Ljung and ABF said that they could not participate in a merger, and Logen Finnveden was absent. However, the representatives from Ljungby folkbibliotek and Ljungby köping agreed to merge their libraries. Shortly thereafter Ljungby folkbibliotek's collection was moved to Ljungby köping's premises at Storgatan.

At the end of 1927, Ljungby had 2,924 inhabitants and the library on Storgatan had 769 volumes and 176 lenders.

=== Köpingsgården, the old clog factory (1928–1965) ===
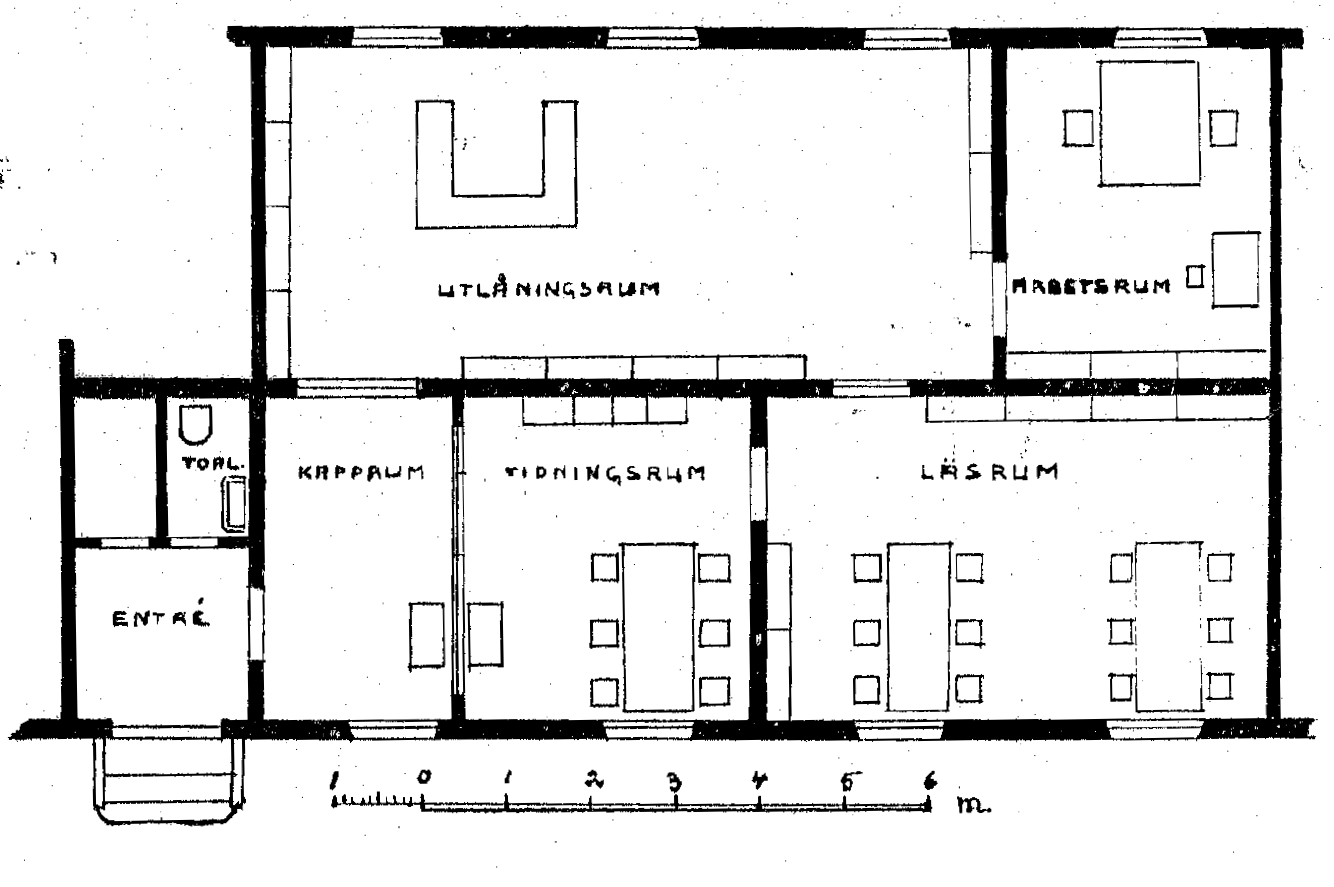
Overview of the library at Köpingsgården in 1937.

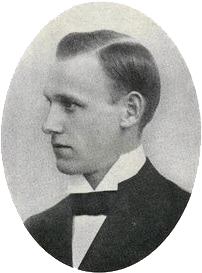
John Howding (taken 1932), librarian and later library director at Ljungby Köpings Bibliotek.

In 1928 the library moved to the old clog factory Köpingsgården on Skånegatan street, which they had already bought in 1925 for 40,000 kronor. With the move the library acquired an additional two rooms and now had 48 square metres (520 sq ft) of space. Librarian there was John Howding, who in 1925 had succeeded Ernst Malmertz. Howding managed to quadruple the library's governmental grant by formally becoming a library director and acquiring a collection of reference books. But the Skolöverstyrelse still forced Howding and library assistant Karl Loby to attend a two-week library course in Stockholm. In 1936 the library expanded to 85 square metres (910 sq ft), after several years of complaints from the Skolöverstyrelse about the all too small rooms. In the trade paper Biblioteksbladet Howding said:

"[...]Since Ljungby is our country's second youngest city, and also one of the smaller ones, with only circa 5000 inhabitants, no one dared expect that the city already would appear among them who during last year acquired stately new buildings with modernly furnished libraries... It is the hope of the library board that these facilities, although small and simple, would be a calm refuge for those of the city's inhabitants for whom useful knowledge and pleasant amusement is the sought-after goal." - John Howding

In 1937 Howding managed at last to fulfill the merger, that had partially failed fifteen years earlier, with the remaining libraries in Ljungby. They acquired additional 550 to 600 bands – which can be compared to the 184 newly sourced books their then budget allowed. In 1941 the library at the old clog factory peaked at 11,800 borrowed books and 900 borrowers, with a town population of about 5,300 inhabitants. In 1957 Ljungby's first qualified librarian was hired.

=== Brunnsparken, the former restaurant (1965–1982) ===
On 1 July 1965, the library moved to larger premises of 350 square metres (3,800 sq ft) by Brunnsparken park, when the previous restaurant moved to the newly built Terraza building. At the end of the 1960s the library lent out 60,000 books per year and was open 28 hours per week. In 1971 a national municipal reform occurred and Ljungby municipality's population increased to 26,000 inhabitants; but the library was just suited for a population of half that size, despite that the building had been expanded by 500 square metres (5,400 sq ft). The Cultural Committee of Ljungby – which had replaced the library board – concluded that there was too little staff, too few books, and too small rooms.

==== The mobile library ====
As an initial solution to these problems a bookmobile was bought which made its first trip on 23 August 1976. During the first trip 2,400 books were carried. Not all of these belonged to Ljungby library as only 700 had been bought during the year, whereof 165 of these were children's books. But since these 700 books were not enough another 2,000 books were lent from Växjö Library. An additional 40,000 SEK in grant would subsequently be requested from the cultural committee to fill the mobile library with their own books. On 15 October 1976, TV channel TRU showed a 10-minute program about the mobile library in Ljungby called "Questions about the future - a rolling library", a part of the three-episode series "Questions about the future". The program included issues related to branch libraries.

In 1979 the mobile library accounted for twenty-eight percent of the total lending in Ljungby, which for comparison was as much as the whole library at the end of the 1960s.

==== The plans of a dedicated library building ====
After the mobile library; step two of the size problem started, the construction of a proper library building. Rejected proposals from 1974 and 1975 had suggested an expansion of the current library. But in 1977 it was found that a completely new building was needed. One that was especially adapted to the unique needs of a library, which could serve for 20 to 30 years. In 1979 the municipal council decided that the new library building was going to be a wing of the planned new municipal building at block Herkules just outside the central part of Ljungby. The proposal created debate at the same time it turned out that the municipal budget was not enough to build the two buildings, plus the ice rink that also was planned. To save millions of SEK and not have to build a "brag and indulgence library" it was suggested to rebuild an old car hall. In 1981 the municipal council decided to only build the library; the new plans of a municipal building were scrapped and the current municipal building was instead expanded.

== Ljungby Library (1982–Current) ==
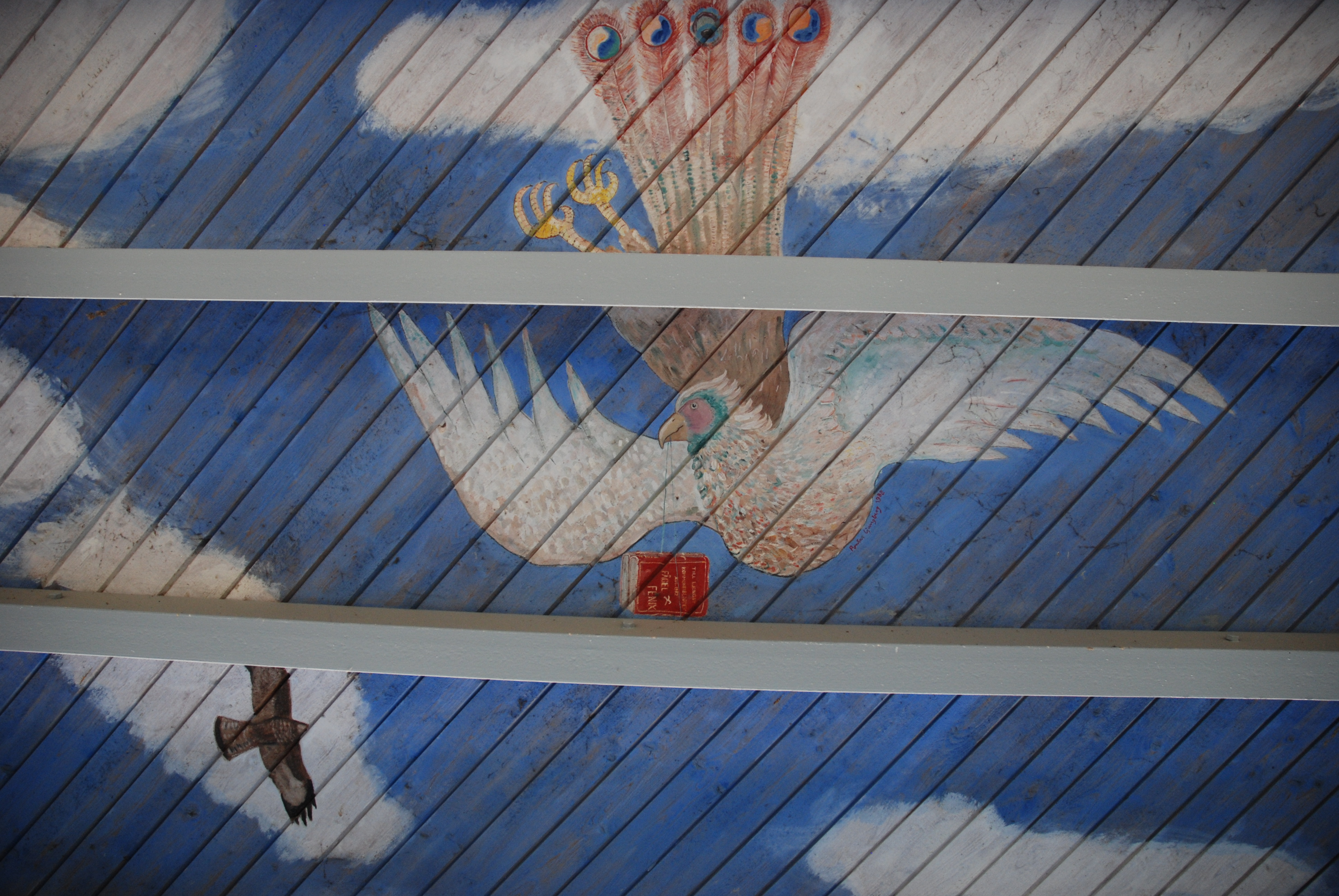
Pontus Ljungberg's painting of Phoenix on the canopy above the entrance.

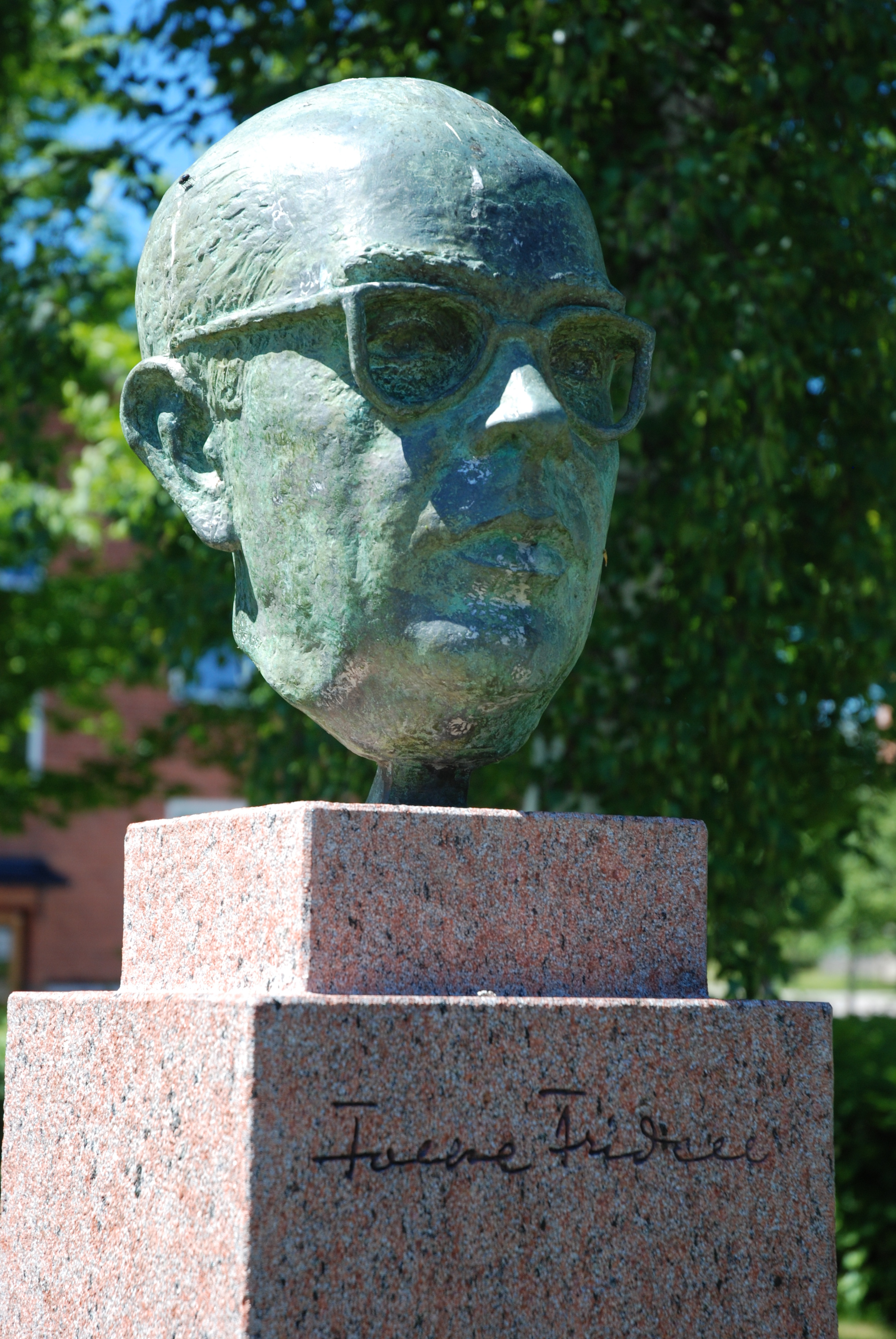
Portrait of Folke Fridell by Maire Männik outside the library.

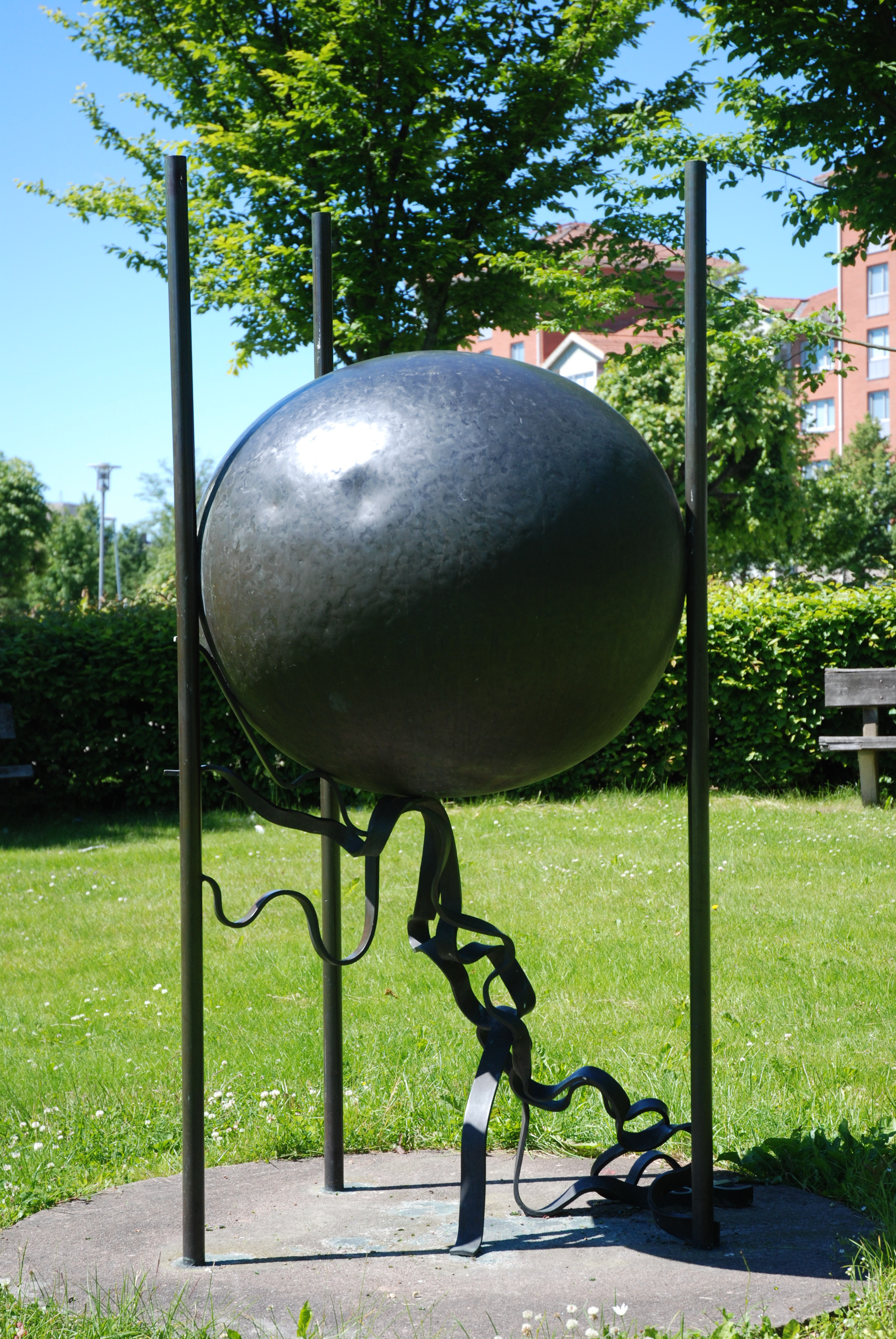
Ingemar Svensson's non-representational sculpture "Glob".

Ljungby Library was designed by architect Jan Wallinder and opened in October 1982. At the opening the library served a population of 27,000 inhabitants, contained 60,000 volumes, and during the opening year lent 141,000 books.

The trade journal Biblioteksbladet, 1985, began an article with "the library in Ljungby has been described by experts as both functionally and architecturally the perhaps most interesting library building, which in recent years has been built in Sweden". However, they commented on the library's location as "too far from the center". Per Nyeng from the Danish trade journal Bibliotek 70 described the library's interior as "a true delight for the eye". Librarian Ingemar Ehlin from Uppsala City Library considered it to be one of the most interesting libraries for its time, thanks to the innovative architecture and its functionality. However, he too was critical of the libraries placement on an old industrial site on "the outskirts of the city" among scattered apartments and houses.

=== Placement ===
According to the original plans the library would be a wing of Ljungby's planned municipal building, so was not the case but the traces of this decision can still be seen. The library is awkwardly located quite a good distance from the city center, which only with good will can be called centrally, surrounded by apartments and small houses without any seemingly justifiable reasons for its position. The absence of the planned municipal building is also one of the reasons the building is located unusually far into the plot. The placement makes it hard to attract passers by as there is little insight to the shelves, books, and visitors. However, this deviation can contribute to the library attaching itself to memory.

=== Exterior ===
The library is a red, two floor, brick-building with black felt roof and looks, partly, like a flat pyramid with broad steps in glass. The building is almost symmetrical, unlike other public buildings in Ljungby, with only the projecting gallery and lecture hall breaking free. On the canopy above the entrance is Pontus Ljungberg's painting of a Phoenix. On the building's opposite side the staff facilities, garage, and loading platform comes forward which gives the building - according to Ingemar Ehlin - "two distinct facades instead of a front and back".

In front of the library is a large courtyard, a result of the absence of the previously planned municipal building and the resulting unusual placement of the library far into the plot. The courtyard consists mostly of trees, shrubs, and green areas. Centrally placed on the yard is Ingemar Svensson's sculpture "Glob" (Eng: "Globe") from 1981, Ljungby's first non-representational artwork. On the yard's western side is Maire Männik's bust of Folke Fridell from 1989, one of Sweden's leading working-class writers who lived in Lagan outside Ljungby. In the southeastern part of the yard is Harald Ahlman's "Labyrint", from 1988, based on the design of classical labyrinths created from 463 stones.

=== Interior ===
Directly adjacent to the entrance is the newspaper room which usually opens a few hours before the rest of the library. The newspaper room is part of the main library room, but is separated by bookshelves and screens. When you enter the library you are met by the circulation desk which is flanked by Sven Ljungberg's pillars that are decorated with birch trunks and owls.

The library room itself is a large open space without shielding walls. The reasons behind this is to make the building clear and easy to navigate. The architect Jan Wallinder has said: "If the plot size is favorable and the size of the library is moderate as in Ljungby, a library plan can be set up so that the public rooms present itself to the visitor at the first step into the house". To the left of the entrance is the children's library and to the right is the adult library. Both departments also meet at the opposite side of the library room, where the passage to the outside atrium, which they both surround, can be found.

The staff rooms are located on the upper floors of the building's center portion which runs around the rectangular atrium. All of these rooms have windows facing the atrium and doors out to the gallery which take the form of a mezzanine floor and give the staff an overview of what is happening in the library room. The gallery has become the motif for the entire building and reminds visitors of the constant work that is going on in the library.

The interior was designed by Rolf and Margareta Åberg, which among other things introduced Sweden's first stepless height-adjustable counter in the library. Rolf Åberg spent much time during the light design with combining day light and electric light. Instead of fixed central lighting fixtures the luminaires were integrated into the bookshelves. This means that the shelves can be moved without the lighting being affected and that the light becomes smoother from top to bottom shelf.

== Branches ==
Ljungby library has branches in Lagan, Ryssby, and Lidhult. There is also a mobile library that visits various stops around Ljungby municipality.

== See also ==
- List of libraries in Sweden
