= Hamneda =

Place in Småland, Sweden

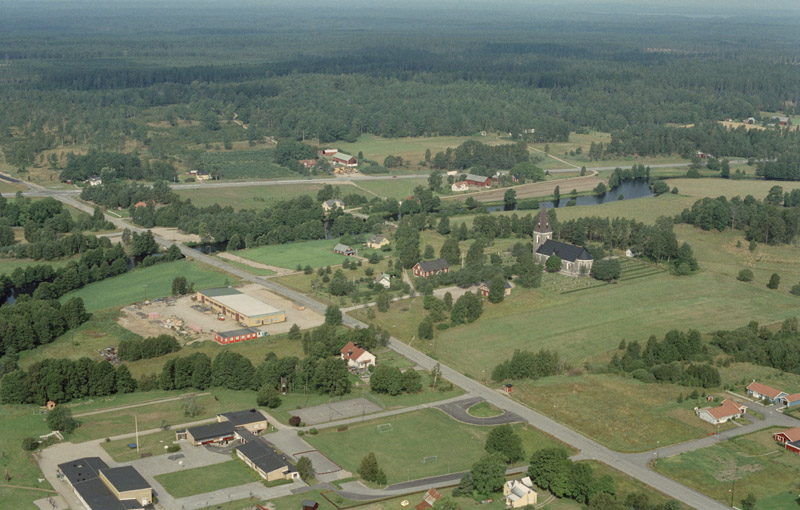
- Aerial photo of Hamneda in 1997
- Interactive map of Hamneda
- Coordinates: 56.697778°N 13.859444°E
- Country: Sweden
- Land: Småland
- County: Kronoberg
- Municipality: Ljungby

Population (2024)
  - Total: 160
- Time zone: UTC+1 (CST)
  - Summer (DST): UTC+2 (CEST)
- Postal code: 341 75

Hamneda is a town in Ljungby Municipality, Kronoberg County, Sweden. As of 2024, the population was 160. Located south of the municipal seat of Ljungby, Hamneda is situated in close proximity to both European route E4 and the Lagan River. Points of interest include the Hamneda Church and a historic inn, which is a listed building. There is also a school and a preschool. The town is one of five service locations within the Ljungby Municipality, a status designed to promote increased investment and resources in selected rural areas.

== History ==
A church had been established in the village by about the 12th century. In 1884, a ferry service was introduced connecting Hamneda to Ljungby along the Lagan River. It was discontinued around 1898 after the town received a station along the Skåne–Småland Railway. The railway spurred more development and commerce in Hamneda. On 1 July 1895, seven people were killed by a lightning strike while working around the town. Six of them were buried at the Hamneda Cemetery, in a ceremony attended by several thousand people. A so-called Blixtstenen (English: Lightning stone) was later erected in memory of the victims.

In the 1960s, the railway was closed. A cist was found in Hamneda in 1996. Smålandsposten reported that it was the first such find to be examined with modern technology. In 2017, the town was hit by a tornado. It tore off a roof but there were no reported injuries. A serious flood from the Lagan River impacted the town in 2020. A channel was dug to protect Hamneda's historic arch bridge from being swept away. It was proposed as a possible service location, a designation which would offer increased investment. By 2022, it had been confirmed as a service location, alongside Lidhult, Lagan, Agunnaryd, and Ryssby.

== Geography ==
It is located south of the town of Ljungby and along the Lagan River.

== Economy ==
Woodcon Hamneda Träproduktion AB, which is located in Hamneda, is the largest company by revenue in the Ljungby Municipality. It employed 38 people as of June 2024.

== Culture ==
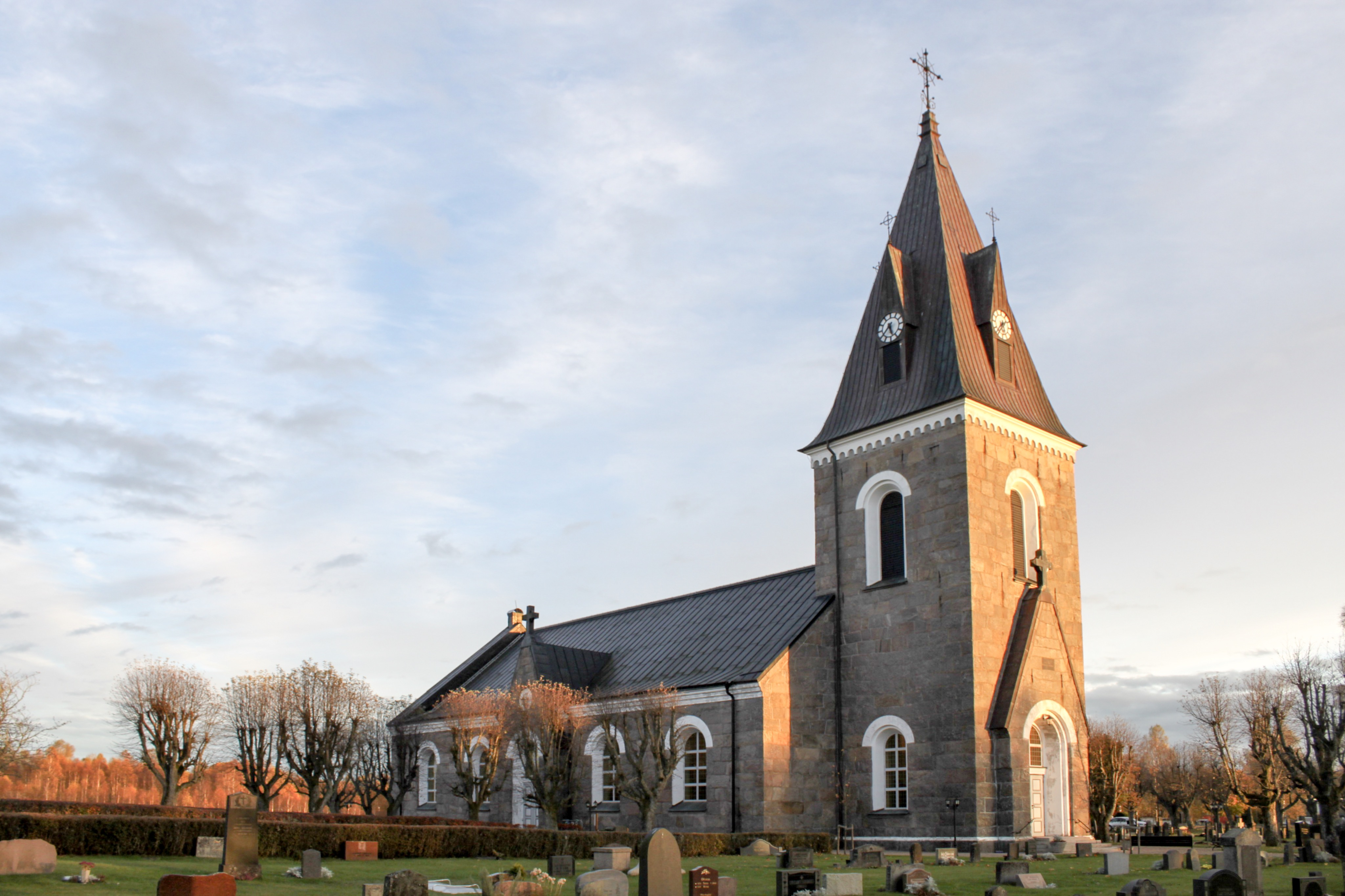
Hamneda Church in 2010

The town contains the Hamneda Church. Hamneda once had its own parish, but merged with two others to form a broader Södra Ljunga parish in 2006. There is also a historic inn, which has stood since 1750 and became a listed building in 1995. The town has an annual summer fair, which features fireworks and various outdoor activities. There is a small Christmas market organized by the local heritage association. Since 2000, there has been an award ceremony for horse breeding hosted in Hamneda at the old railway station. Hamneda GoIK competes in division 6 football.

== Government and politics ==
The Sweden Democrats won 32.6% of the vote during the 2024 European Parliament election, the highest of any electoral district in Kronoberg County.

== Education ==
The town has a preschool and a school, the latter of which was founded in 1959. As of June 2022, both were considered overcrowded and the school was undergoing a renovation. In January 2025, the municipality proposed closing the schools in Hamneda and sending students there to Hjortsberg School in Ljungby, as part of a plan to cut costs by reducing the number of rural schools.

== Transport ==
The town is located along European route E4. County road 594 also passes through, connecting Hamneda to Älmhult. There was previously a station in the town located on the Skåne–Småland Railway, which was closed in the 1960s. Bus line 150, which runs between Ljungby and Markaryd, stops in Hamneda.
