= Märta Ljungberg =

Swedish innkeeper (1656–1741)

Marta Liungberg
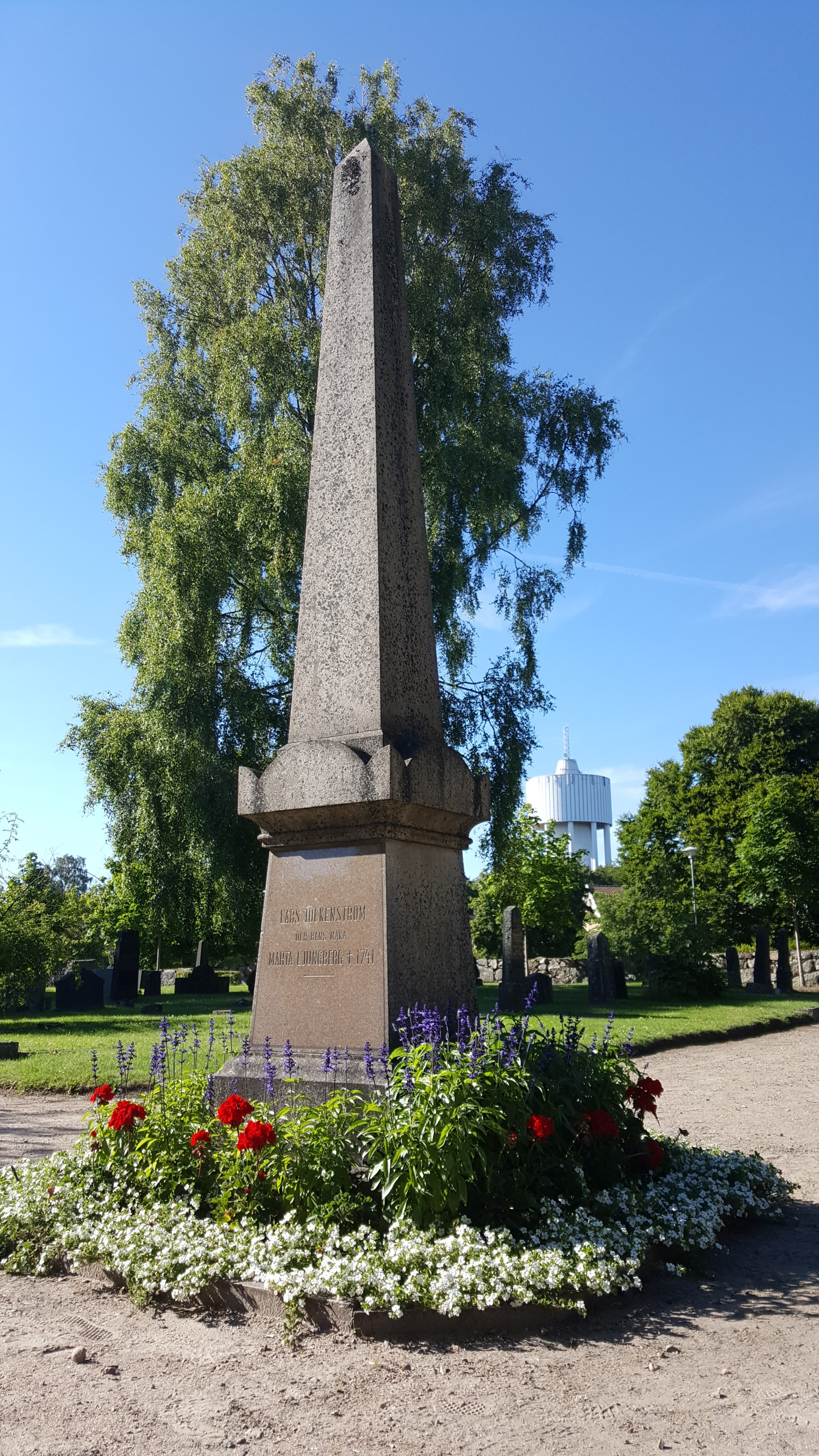
- The burial obelisk at The Old Cemetery marks the place where it is believed Märta Ljungberg, and her husband, lied buried under the church floor.
- Born: 26 May 1656; Ljungby Gård
- Died: 4 October 1741 (aged 85)
- Burial place: Gamla Kyrkogården, Ljungby; 56.835788°N 13.933771°E
- Monuments: Märta Ljungberg's Memorial Stone, Gamla Torg, Ljungby; Märta Ljungbergsvägen, Ljungby
- Spouse: Lars Tåckenström (1681-1714)
- Children: 2

Marta Liungberg (modern spelling: Märta Ljungberg) (1656–1741), was a Swedish innkeeper. She managed the important inn at Ljungby in Sunnerbo. She was also a successful farmer, who acquired many of the farms around the area of the inn. In 1828, when it was decided that a city should be founded in Sunnerbo, Ljungby (at that time only a couple of farms around the inn), was chosen to be founded upon the land donated by her in her will.

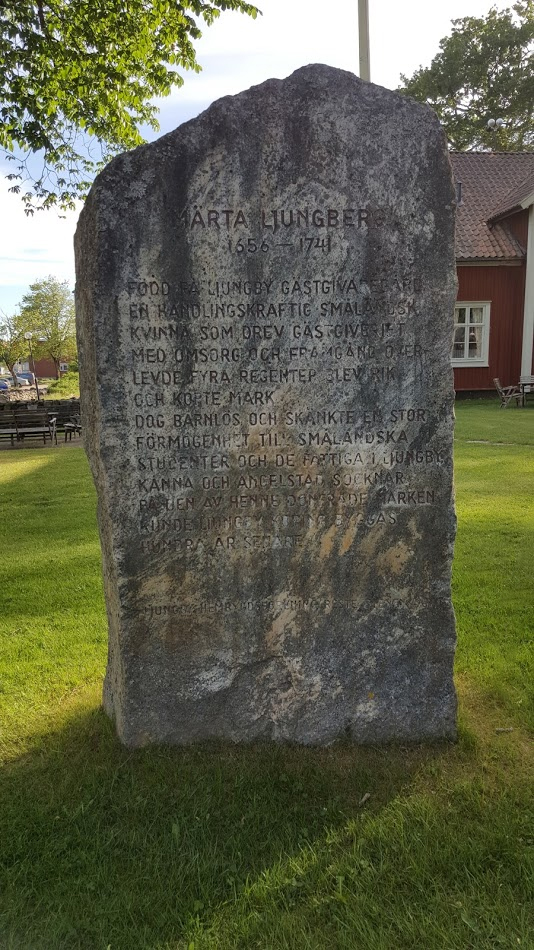
In 1981 a memorial stone was erected near her inn.

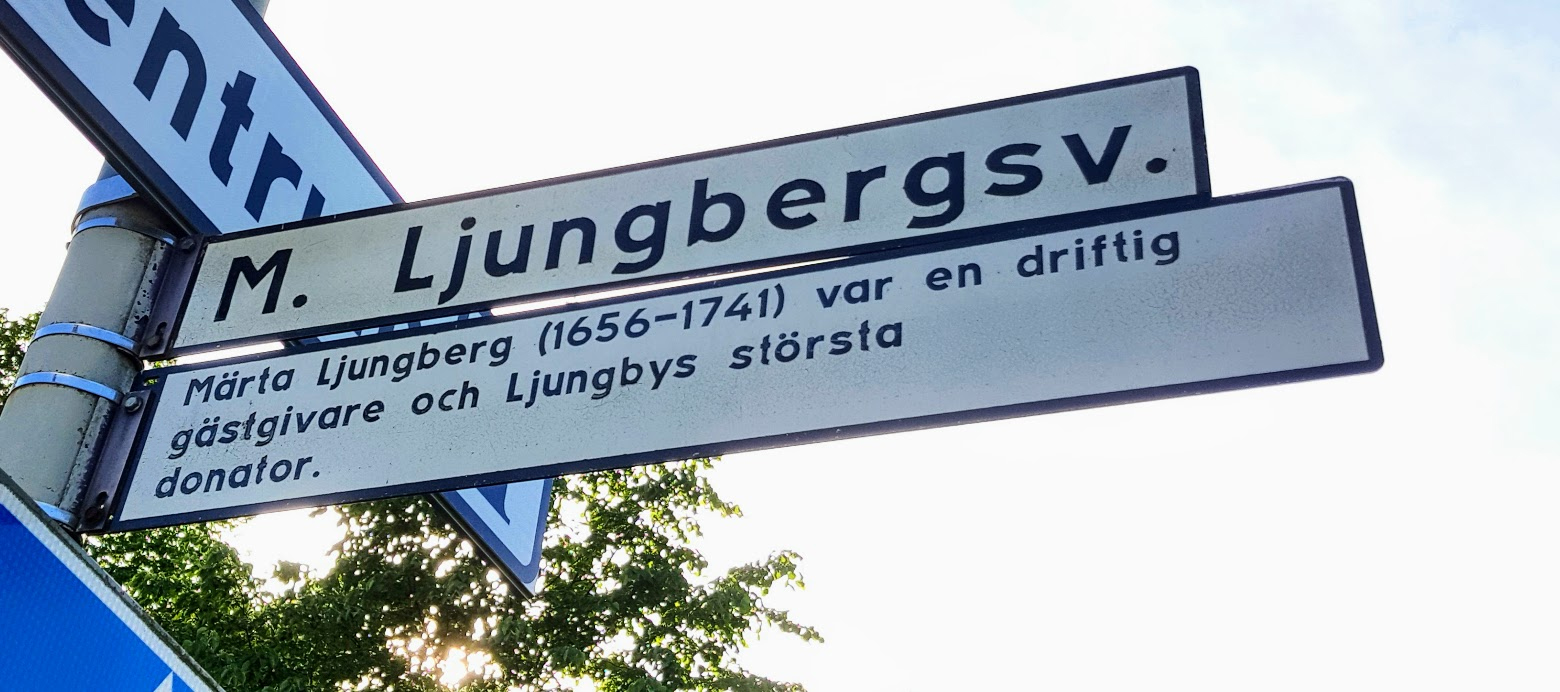
One of Ljungby's major arterial roads is named after Märta Ljungberg.

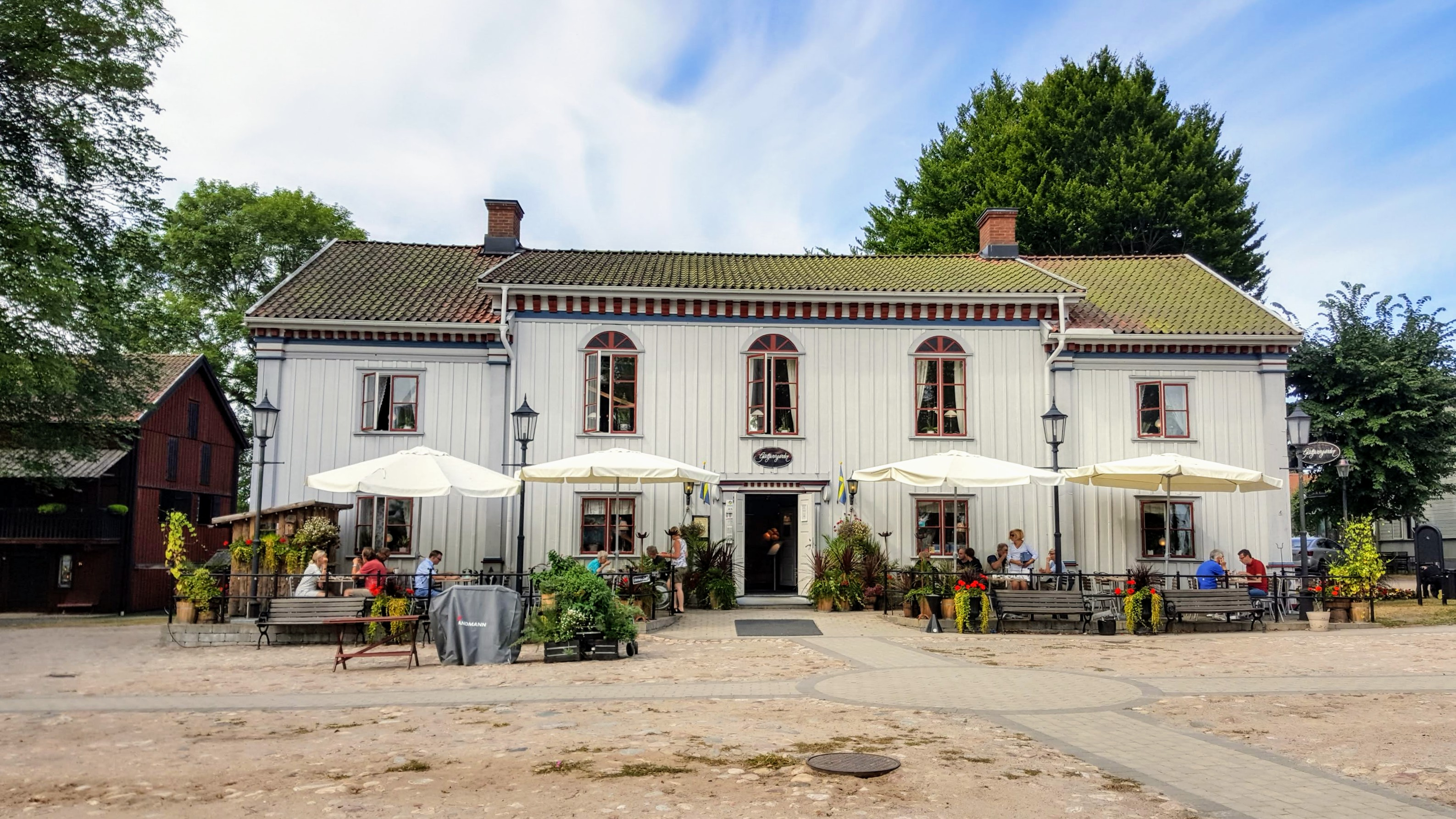
Gästgivaregården in Ljungby that was built after Märta Ljungberg's inn burned down in 1754.

== Before the inn ==
Märta Ljungberg grew up on Ljungby Gård (English: Ljungby Farm) together with her parents and six siblings. She was daughter to frälseinspektor and innkeeper Lars Svensson Frimolin and his wife Margareta Larsdotter.

== Inn ==
After her parents' death the ownership of inn was taken over by her brother Abraham Ljungberg (later Ljungfelt) with the everyday operation handed over to Märta herself. Instead her brother made a career as a county official (Swe: landskamrerare) for the county. During the next four years the thingstead in Hamneda and the marketplace in Berga was moved to Ljungby. In 1681 she married with the district bailiff Lars Tåckenbo. Four years later, 1685, Lars was transferred to Stockholm around the same time as the birth of their first child, the son Samuel. Eight years later Lars was transferred to Halmstad. They had a second son, but he only lived for eight days.

It took several years, into the 1700s, before Lars was transferred to Ljungby under Göta Court of Appeal. Meanwhile, her son Samuel studied in Lund and became captain lieutenant. However, he was hit by the Asian plague and died in 1710 at age 25. Four years later her husband, Lars, died at Angelstad rectory.

After her brother's death in 1724, she was required to pay a retroactively annual lease of the inn to her nephews. After her refusal to pay the inn was ceded to them in 1729, when Märta was 73 years of age.

== Testament ==
In the autumn of 1741 Märtha Ljungberg damaged her hip when she fell off a wagon. She later died on 4 October 1741, 85 years old. After three months lying in state she was buried by dean Olof Osander. During her life she managed to acquire an estate of twelve farms; including Eskilsgården, Södergården, and Klockaregården that today is located in and around Ljungby's Old Marketplace.

Before her death, she decided that the proceeds of her estate should go to scholarships for students of Smålands Nation in Lund and the poor in Ljungby, Kånna och Angelstad's parishes. Her nephews were disinherited.

In 1754 the inn burned to the ground, but is later rebuilt between 1818 and 1820 in its current form.

== Legacy ==
During the 1828 discussions about the founding of a new town in Sunnerbo, Ljungby was elected thanks to her donation. The town of Ljungby would then later be founded on the land donated by Märta Ljungberg.

In 1981 a memorial stone was erected in her memory at the old market place where her inn was located.

The street Märta Ljungbergsvägen (Eng: Märta Ljungberg's Street) was named after her. It is one of the most trafficked streets in Ljungby and part of the old trade route that brought most of her customers.
