= Lidhult =

- Location within Kronoberg Location within Sweden
- Coordinates: 56°49′42″N 13°26′21″E
- Country: Sweden
- Province: Småland
- County: Kronoberg County
- Municipality: Ljungby Municipality

Area
  - Total: 1.09 km^{2} (0.42 sq mi)

Population (31 December 2010)
  - Total: 611
  - Density: 559/km^{2} (1,450/sq mi)
- Time zone: UTC+1 (CET)
  - Summer (DST): UTC+2 (CEST)

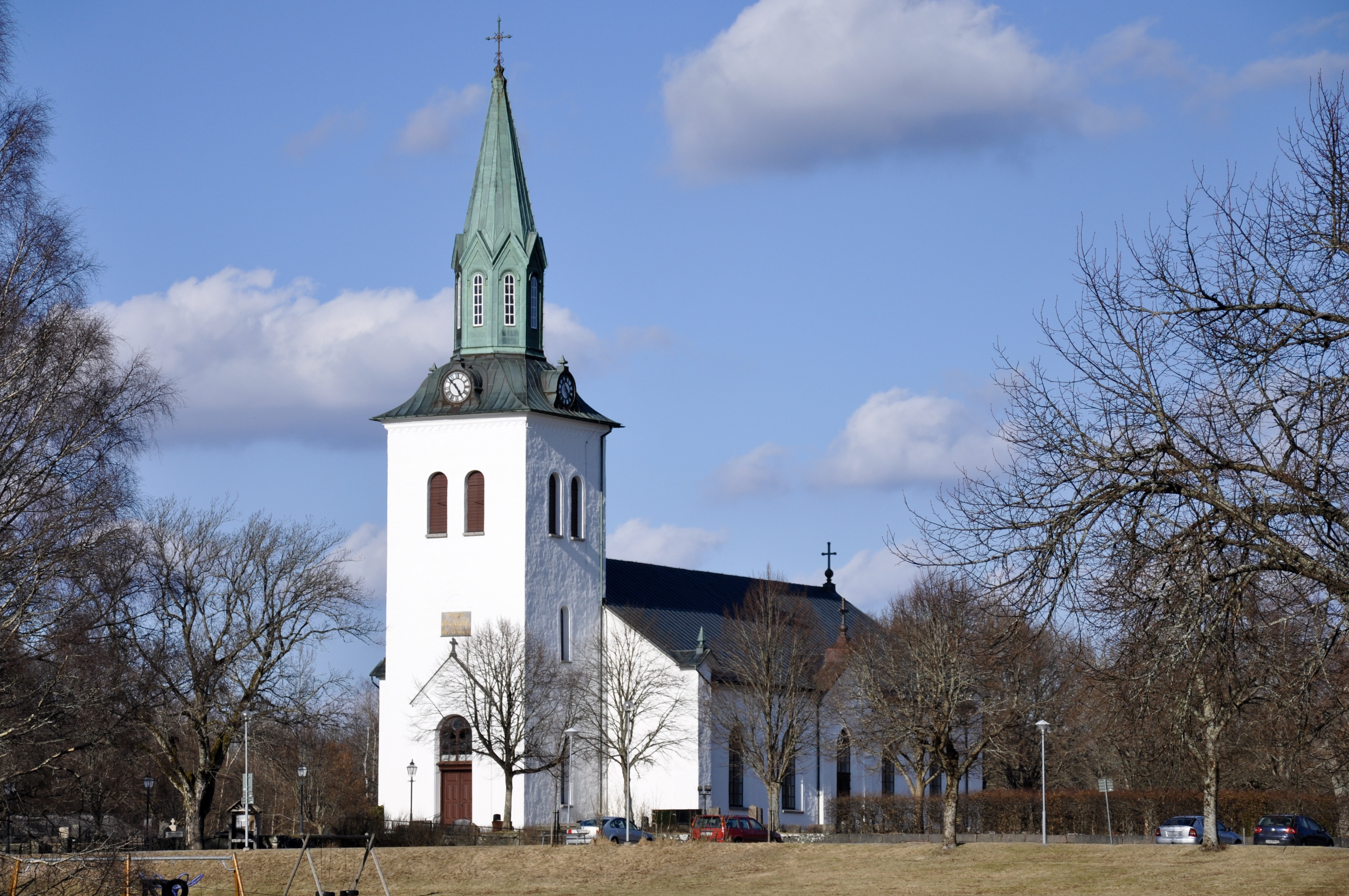
Lidhult church, Kronoberg county, Sweden.

Lidhult is a locality situated in Ljungby Municipality, Kronoberg County, Sweden with 611 inhabitants in 2010. It is one of five service locations within the Ljungby Municipality, alongside Agunnaryd, Hamneda, Lagan, and Ryssby.

== Economy ==
The company Holtab opened a concrete assembly plant there in 2021. Previously, the forklift manufacturer Lidhults Mekaniska Verkstad had employed around 160 people in Lidhult before moving productions to Poland around 2016.
