= Tellus, Ljungby =

City block in Ljungby, Sweden

Tellus is one of central Ljungby's oldest city blocks and was spared by the fire of 1953. It is bounded by Smedjegatan in north, Kungsgatan in east, Stationsgatan in south, and Föreningsgatan in west. To the west lies also the plaza Stora Torg, and across is block Minerva with the Terraza building.

== Tellushuset ==
The Tellus Building
- Tellushuset
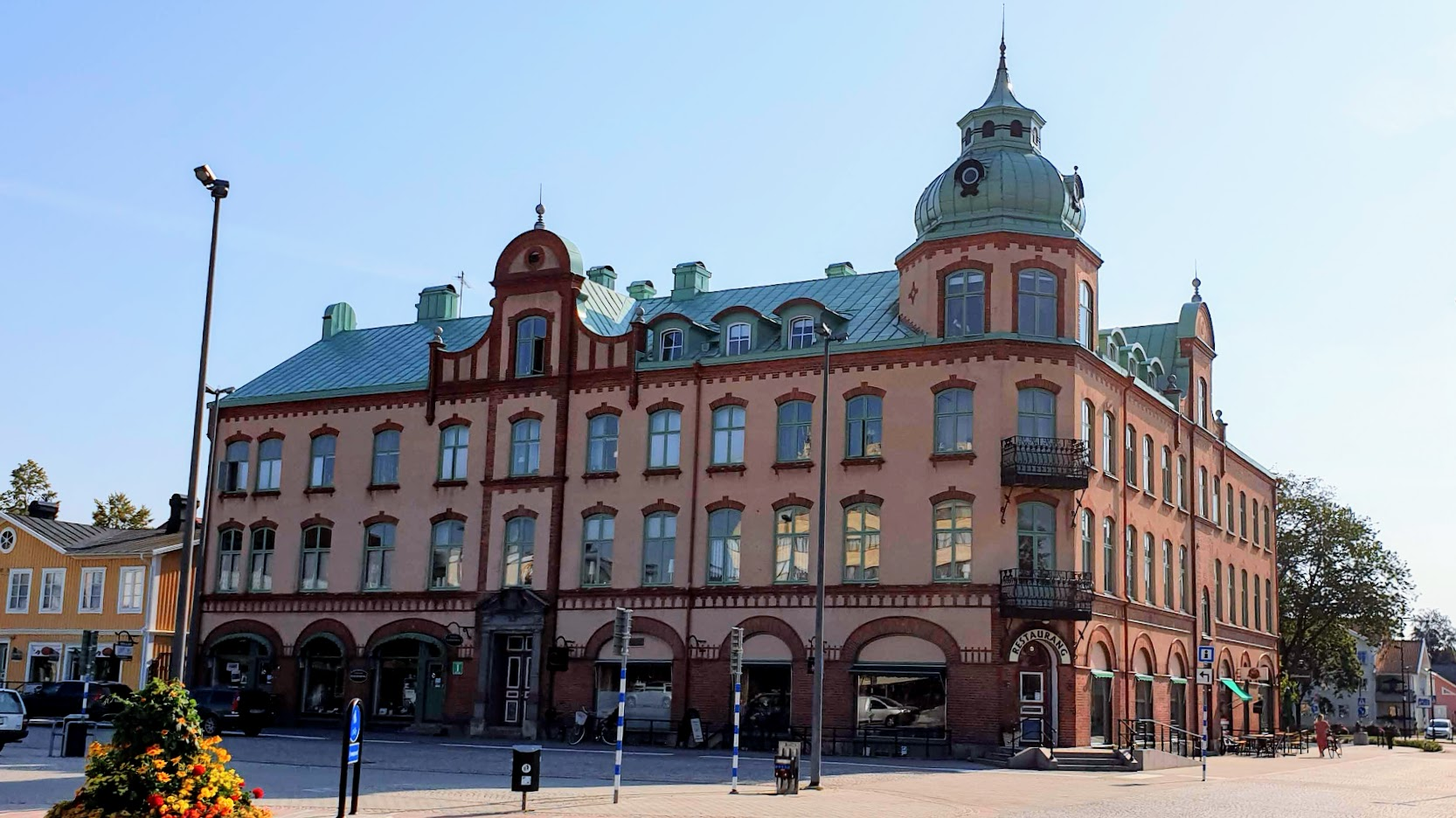
- Tellushuset seen from Stationsgatan
- Interactive map of the The Tellus Building area
- Etymology: Named after the block, named after the Roman goddess and planet Earth

General information
- Type: Residential and retail
- Architectural style: Renaissance Revival
- Location: Stora Torget 6 Storgatan 21, Ljungby, Sweden
- Coordinates: 56°49′58.7″N 13°56′27.4″E
- Completed: 1906

Height
- Height: 16.7 meter

Technical details
- Floor count: 3

Design and construction
- Architect: Aron Johansson
- Awards: Arkitekturupproret – "Småland's most beautiful building"

Tellushuset, or The Tellus Building in English, is a three-story-tall residential and retail building in the south-western corner along Storgatan and Föreningsgatan, it is also met by the street Stationsgatan from south-west, and is one of the few remaining buildings from Ljungby's market town period. It was finished in 1906 after the former wooden building with Peter Adam Johansson shoe factory burnt down 1904. Tellushuset is constructed with bricks from one of Ljungby's two brickyards, dressed in pink plaster with a base and decorations in brown-red bricks, adorned with a patina coated copper roof with an onion dome, and verdigris windows.

Tellushuset was designed by architect Aron Johansson, raised in Ryssby outside Ljungby, who also designed the national parliament building Riksdagshuset and then central bank building Riksbankshuset on the island Helgeandsholmen in Stockholm. It is also likely that Aron Johansson designed Tellushuset's one story shorter twin-sister Fogelbergska huset, that stood finished 1910 and lay diagonally across the plaza Stora Torg on city block Månen. According to the painter and former rector of the Royal Swedish Academy of Fine Arts and the Royal Institute of Art, Sven Ljungberg, the two buildings contributed the impression of being in a Russian city, especially wintertime.

=== Plans for demolition ===
While both Tellushuset and its sister Fogelbergska survived the fire of 1953, they were about to be demolished to give room to the newly planned modern metropolitan city centre. The Månen block with Fogelbergska was demolished already in 1963 and was replaced by an EPA department store. After that, it was Tellus' and Tellushuset's turn. The whole block had been sold to Kooperativa Förbundet who planned to construct a Domus department store. However, there was an error among the calculations and it turned out that the block was too small for both the department store and its parking lot. Therefore the block was repurchased by Ljungby Municipality and the department store was instead built on block Violen.

=== The rescue ===
While it had some tenants, Tellushuset was mostly dilapidated with falling plaster and an old neglected interior, it even carried the vernacular name "the Brick Barn" ["Tegelladan"]. Ljungby Municipality was of the opinion that the whole block had to be demolished and give room to new, more modern, buildings. Tellushuset's rescue came 1978 in the form of Louise Andersson who shared her idea about buying Tellushuset with her husband Rune "Truck-Rune" Andersson, who recently sold his share of Ljungbytruck to Kalmar Verkstad, and would later found Ljungby Maskin. Rune Andersson hesitated at first when he heard his wife Louise's suggestion, but soon realized that she was right. However, during the meeting with municipal commissioner Nils-Ivar Påhlsson the negotiations came to a complete halt as the demolition plans were too far advanced for any changes to be done. In a last effort Rune Andersson offered one million SEK for the whole block, including the renovations. This made the municipal commissioner hesitate for a moment before he, according to Rune Andersson, lit up and said "This we can earn votes on". This decision nevertheless encountered protests with slogans such as "Tellus to the people - not the capital" with an appeal as a result, but the purchase finally went through in 1979. The couple has thenceforward spent many times over renovating the block.

=== "Småland's most beautiful building" ===
Since spring 2017 Tellushuset is featured on the national television channel TV3's idents that is shown in conjunction with commercial breaks, along with numerous other notable buildings.

During 2019 the nonprofit association Arkitekturupproret with 37 000 members begun a vote to elect "Sweden's most beautiful building", excluding churches and castles, with a preparatory vote in each province. The basis of the vote was to "show that there are alternatives to the modernism's square boxes and spectacularly boastful constructions". In the Småland vote, with a total of 1 746 votes, the Tellushuset won with 276 votes, before Kalmar Stadshotell on second place with about half the number. In the national vote with a total of 18 127 votes the Tellushuset landed in twelfth position with 313 votes, between Sollefteå court house and Visby's old pharmacy. In first place came Lund's University Library with 1 249 votes.

== Ernfrid ==
Ernfrid
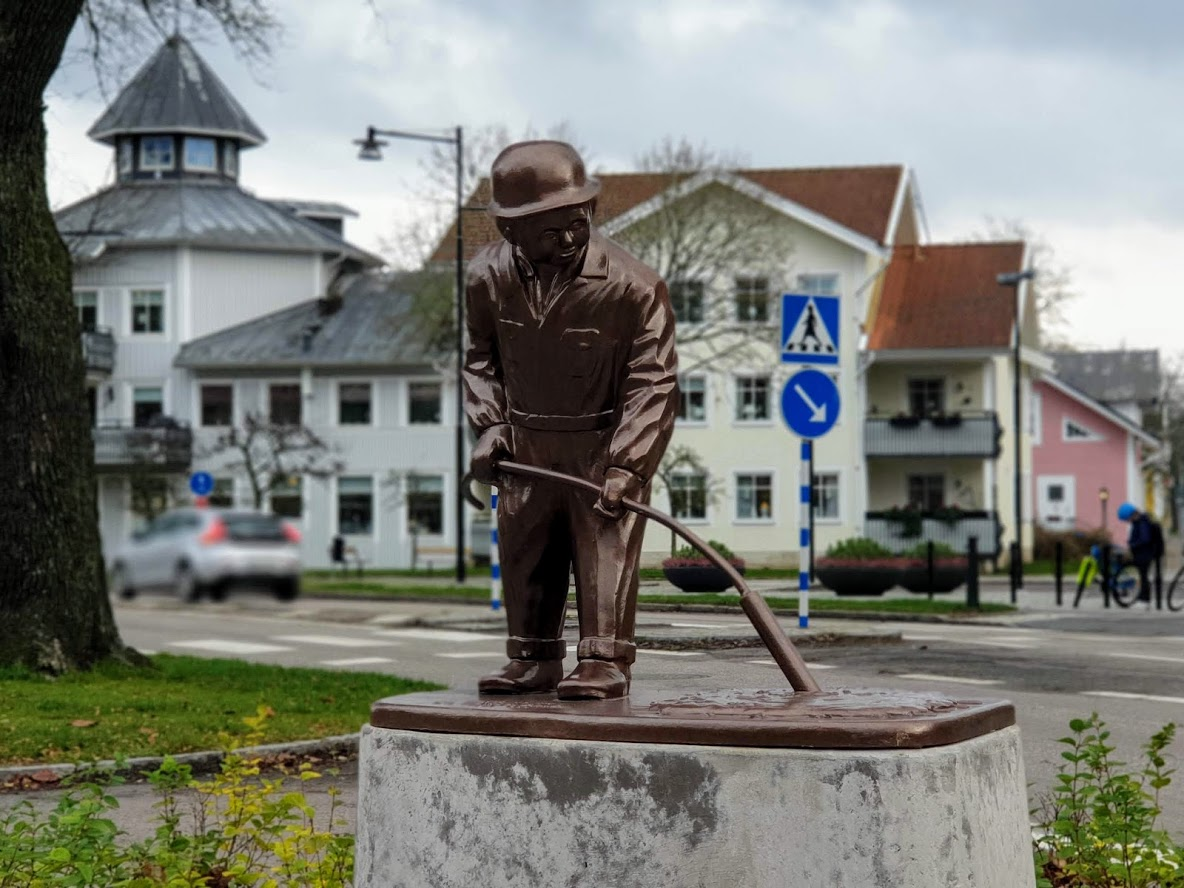
- Artist: Carl Meijer
- Year: 13 January 1970 (cast); 13 November 2018 (current location)
- Medium: Grey iron statue
- Subject: Worker with a handheld concrete vibrator
- Location: Ljungby, Sweden; 56°49′58.2″N 13°56′29.5″E
- Owner: Ljungby municipality
- Website: https://www.ljungby.se/konst

Ernfrid is an industrial-historic gray iron statue made by Carl Meijer (1908-2004) that stands in the south-eastern corner along Kungsgatan and Rune B. Johanssons gata portraying a worker holding a handheld concrete vibrator. It was cast January 13, 1970, together with three or four copies of the last melt from Vibro-Verket's foundry facility before it was put out of commission. The other copies were sent to the head office in Stockholm and the factories in Karlstad, Sweden and São Paulo, Brazil. The prototype in bronze was given to Vibro-Verket's director Stig Giertz Hedström when he left.
The sculptor Carl Meijer was a model carpenter and made casting models at Vibro-Verket. When the foundry department were to be closed, it was decided to make a statue of the company's first and most popular product, the handheld concrete vibrator, to which they owed much of their success. The concrete vibrator was introduced in 1934 and was used to spread the concrete evenly around the reinforcing bars. As model stood maintenance foreman Ernfrid Johansson.

Carl Meijer did first make a model out of wood, then plaster, before casting it in massive grey iron and then placing it outside Vibro-Verket. There it stood until Dynapac took over and moved it to the new facilities some hundred meters away. When Dynapac Ljungby was defunct in 2011, the association "Vibro-Verken Ljungby Historiska Sällskap" ["Vibro-Verken Ljungby Historical Society"] took over much of the company's material, such as the archives and the statue. In 2013 they donated the statue to Ljungby municipality which promised to place it at a suitable spot by the central plaza Stora Torg. One of the spots that were discussed was in the corner of Förningsgatan and Smedjegatan, another spot was by the Tellushuset. The statue did however remain stored.

During 2018, anticipating the upcoming election, the local newspaper Smålänningen had an article series called "#kandulova" ["#canyoupromise"] where local citizens aimed questions to local politicians. One of these questions was "Can you promise that the statue "Ernfrid" that Vibro-Verkens LHS donated to Ljungby Municipality 2013 during the next term of office will be placed according to agreement?". A couple of days later Ljungby Municipality's culture strategist answered that the next term will probably not even begin before the statue is in place. In November 2018 the statue was inaugurated, after extensive and several months long repurposing and renovation work of the former railroad embankment and the street Rune B. Johanssons gata. The statue had also been cleaned and had a back injury repaired.
