= Våraskruv Nature Reserve =

Nature reserve in Kronoberg, Sweden

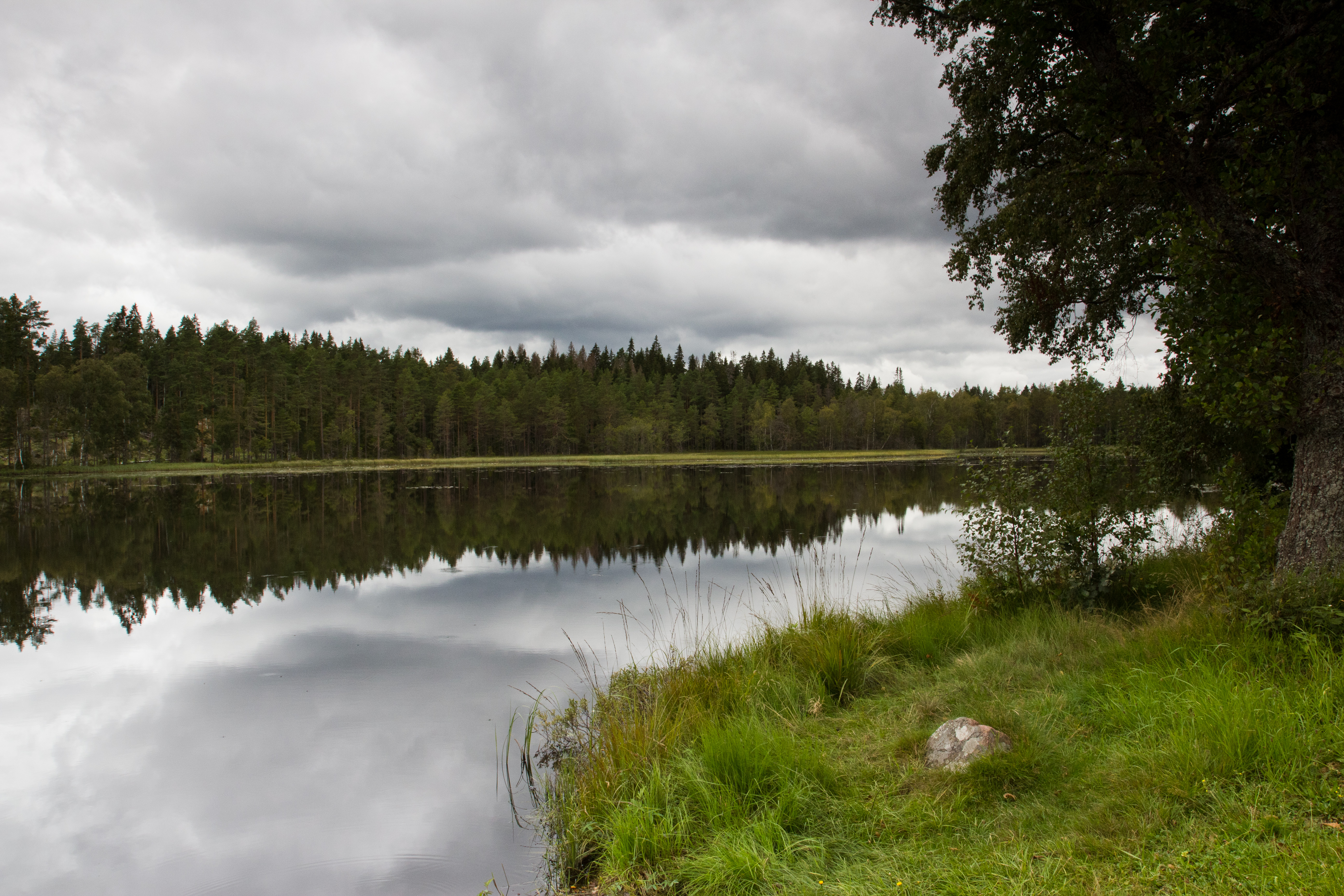

- Location within Southern Sweden
- Location: Sweden
- Nearest city: Växjö
- Coordinates: 57°01′48″N 15°27′02″E
- Area: 78 ha (190 acres)
- Established: 1959

Våraskruv Nature Reserve is a nature reserve in Kronoberg County, Sweden.

The nature reserve protects an area of still maintained old-fashioned meadows and tended fields. Several large oaks grow in the area and support a variety of insects and birds. The nature reserve also includes a lake (Lake Våraskruv). For the convenience of visitors, footpaths have been prepared in the nature reserve.
