= Småland Runic Inscription 39 =

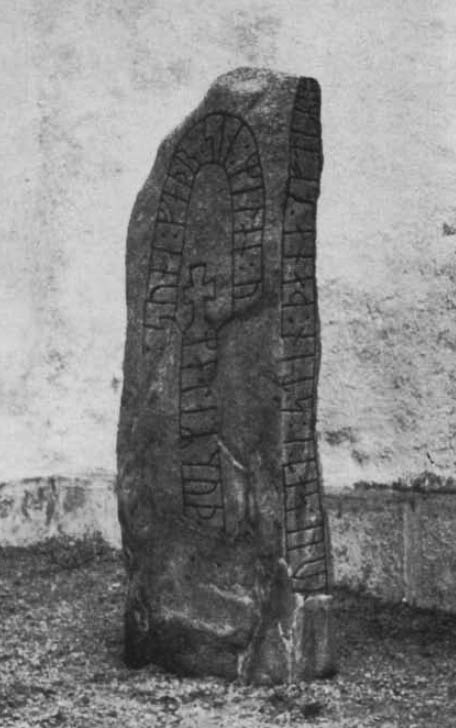
Sm 39 in a 1964 photograph after it had been removed from the church wall.

Småland Runic Inscription 39 or Sm 39 is the Rundata catalog listing for a Viking Age memorial runestone that is located in Ryssby, Kronoberg County, Sweden, in the historic province of Småland.

== Description ==
The inscription on this gneiss runestone, which is 2.2 meters in height, consists of runic text inscribed in the younger futhark in three text bands, the first band, marked as "A" in the transliteration of the runes, along the side of the stone, and two band marked as "B" with one forming an arch over a cross and the second directly below the cross. The text is damaged at the end of the first line of text band "B", but the words have been interpolated based upon similar inscriptions. The inscription was first noted in 1844 by vicar A. R. Lindroth when the materials from a medieval church was being used in the construction of a new church. Before the historic significance of runestones was understood, they were often reused in the construction of roads, bridges, and buildings such as churches. Lindroth noted the location in the wall of the new church where the stone was being placed. On October 14, 1964, the Swedish National Heritage Board supervised the removal of the stone from the church wall and raised it on the church grounds.

The runic text states that the stone was raised by Gunni as a memorial for his son Soni. Soni is described using Old Norse phrases as being mildan orða or "gentle in speech" and mataʀ goða or "free with food." This description is consistent with generosity with food and feasting being renowned in Viking Age Scandinavia. Several other runestones also note persons who are generous with food, including inscriptions Sm 44 in Ivla, Sö 130 in Hagstugan, U 703 in Väppeby, and U 805 in Fröslunda, where men are described using a form of matar góðan or "free with food," U 739 in Gådi and DR 291 in Sövestad, which describe men using a form of mildr mataʀ or "generous with food," and Sm 37 in Rörbro which uses yndr mataʀ or "liberal with food."

Based upon stylistic analysis, the runologist Sven B. F. Jannson has suggested that the unnamed runemaster who carved Sm 39 also carved inscriptions Sm 5 in Transjö and Sm 44 in Ivla. For example, the rune forms for both Sm 39 and Sm 5 are somewhat unusual as the m-runes are dotted and the k-runes have a stroke to the left instead of to the right, and the runic text on both stones uses two dots (:) as a word separator punctuation mark.

This runestone is known locally as the Ryssbystenen.

== Inscription ==
=== Transliteration of the runes into Latin characters ===
A: : kuni : sati : stin : þana : iftiʀ :
B: suna : faþr : sin : milan : u... ... mataʀ kuþa... :

=== Transcription into Old Norse ===
A: Gunni satti stæin þenna æftiʀ
B: Suna, faður sinn, mildan o[rða ok] mataʀ goða[n].

=== Translation in English ===
A: Gunni placed this stone in memory of
B: Soni, his father, gentle in speech and free with food.
