= Folke Fridell =

Swedish writer

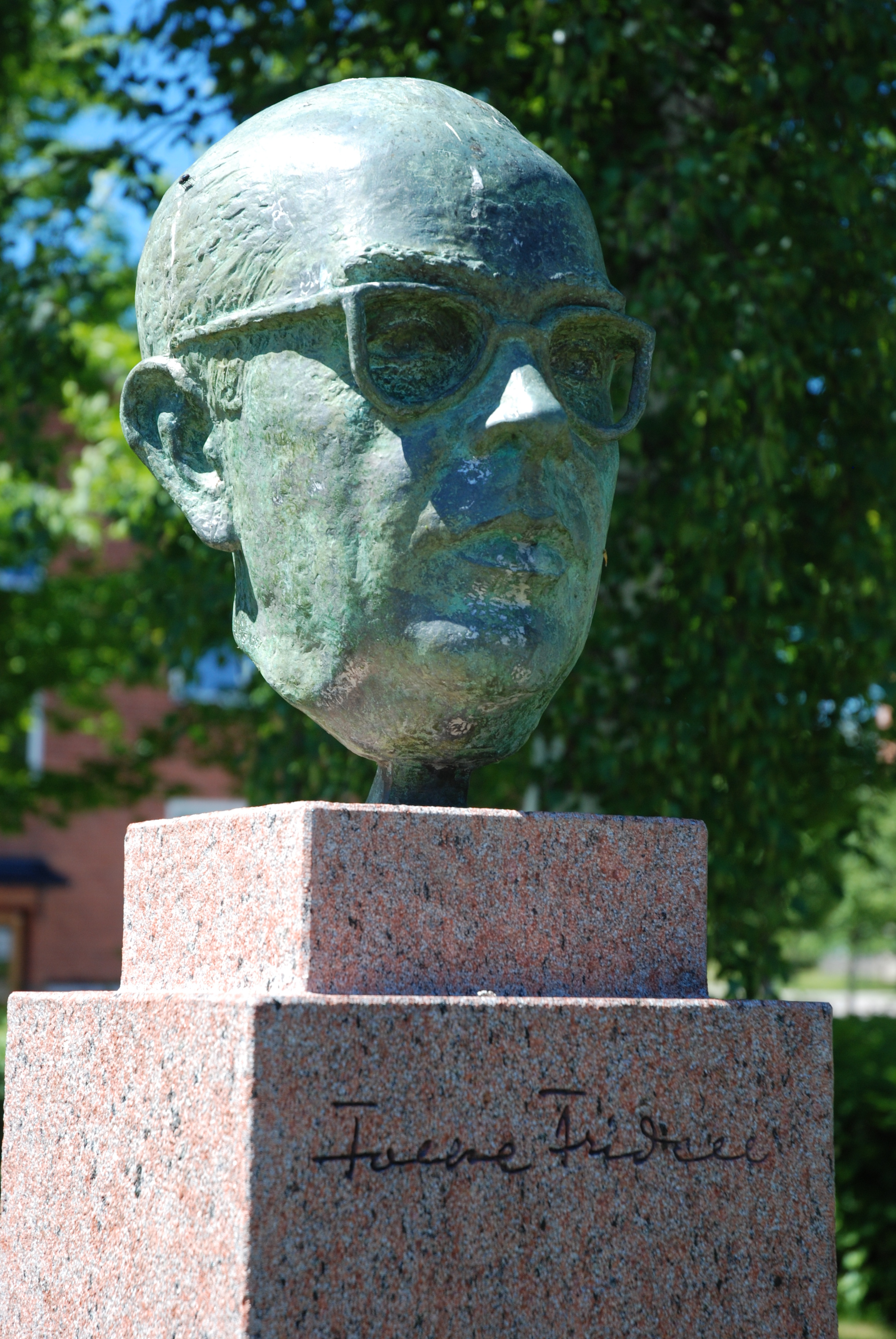
Bust of Folke Fridell outside Ljungby library

Folke Ivar Valter Fridell (1 October 1904 – 12 August 1985) was a Swedish writer of the proletarian school and syndicalist.

== Biography ==
Fridell was born the youngest of a large family (6 siblings, and 6 more half siblings by his father) living in a stream-side home in a woods in Lagan, Kronoberg County, Småland, in Götaland, Sweden. That part of Sweden consists of forested lakes and bogs, out of which arable patches had been carved. In the late 18th through early 19th centuries, the region had hemorrhaged emigrants to Minnesota. Fridell's mother was a public school teacher and seamstress and his father was a soldier, tailor, and postal carrier. The family was locally known for their intense reading culture, and Fridell's education mostly came through that family culture, the local library, and a book collection he found in a deserted house while he was shepherding. At age 13, he started working in a textile factory, and after a youthful spell of learning the masculine arts of card-playing, drinking, fighting, and generally being a roughneck, at age 19 he was shocked straight by his older brother's drowning. Thereafter he returned to reading, and in addition took up writing after factory work hours. Fridell married Hanna "Stina" Wahlberg (9 years his junior) in 1934, and together they raised two boys, born 17 years apart. He would remain at the factory until 1946, when he was able to quit and support himself on his writing.

Despite his brief hard-living stint, at a young age, Fridell joined the IOGT, the Temperance movement. In 1921, the year of his brother's death, he participated in the formation of and was made secretary of a local branch of the Central Organisation of the Workers of Sweden (Sveriges arbetares centralorganisation, SAC). In meetings, he was at first shy about the organization material he wrote. When the Syndicalist Workers' Federation (Syndikalistiska arbetarefederationen, SAF) broke from SAC in 1929, Fridell followed, as he admired the more radical politics of the founder, a Swede who had spent some years working and living in the U.S. Fridell became a member of SAC once again when SAF merged back into SAC in 1938.

In the 1930s, Fridell started writing for Arbetare-Kuriren, the newspaper of SAF. After the reunion of SAC and SAF in 1938, he contributed frequently to Arbetaren, SAC's newspaper. Fridell is recognized as a theorist of syndicalism. He was also active as a lecturer and a delegate at several SAC congresses; from 1942 until 1946, he was a deputy in the organisation's central committee. Swedish Syndicalist archives include posters prominently advertising Fridell as the featured speaker at May Day demonstrations inviting "All peace- and freedom-loving people together."

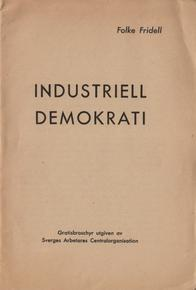
Fridell's theoretical essay on industrial democracy

Fridell debuted as a fiction writer with the novel Tack för mig – grottekvarn ("Thanks from me, treadmill") in 1945, and his breakthrough came with his second novel, the strongly autobiographical Död mans hand (1946). He was hooked and wrote a book nearly every year thereafter, winning labor and national awards for his writing every decade of his life after 1950. Although they were savagely denounced and dismissed by conservatives, his novels were widely read, in part thanks to their distribution by book ombudsmen in the factories.

== Legacy ==
Fridell explained the reason behind his art: "As long as there are proletarians, there is a proletarian literature. And I would like to go a little further and say that as long as people are insulted in their work for so long, there must be voices that speak their language and take their case."

By his influential criticism of monotonous and soul-killing factory work in Sweden's modernizing era of Taylorist automation, Fridell become a renewer of the workplace as well as a champion of the right of the worker to defend his dignity and capacity for cooperative decision-making. Other frequent themes of Fridell's writing were juvenile delinquency, rural flight and dystopian views of the future.

Fridell's work has been regarded as easy to read, conveying an ironic sense of humor. A prolific writer and editorialist, he often wrote in the voice of an alter ego. His play "One Man's Bread" was translated into English; the working class characters' dialogue was represented in British cockney accents. Fridell's novel Rikedom ("Wealth," 1956) was made into a television film in 1978. In 2005 Swedish singer-songwriter (and orienteering expert) Erik de Vahl released a mellow song he composed and named after Fridell.

Fridell died in 1985 at the age of 80 and is buried in the cemetery of Berga church in Lagan. Outside the library in Ljungby, a bronze bust of Folke Fridell commemorates his contributions to the development of literature, theory, working conditions, and human liberty in Sweden.
