= Kånna =

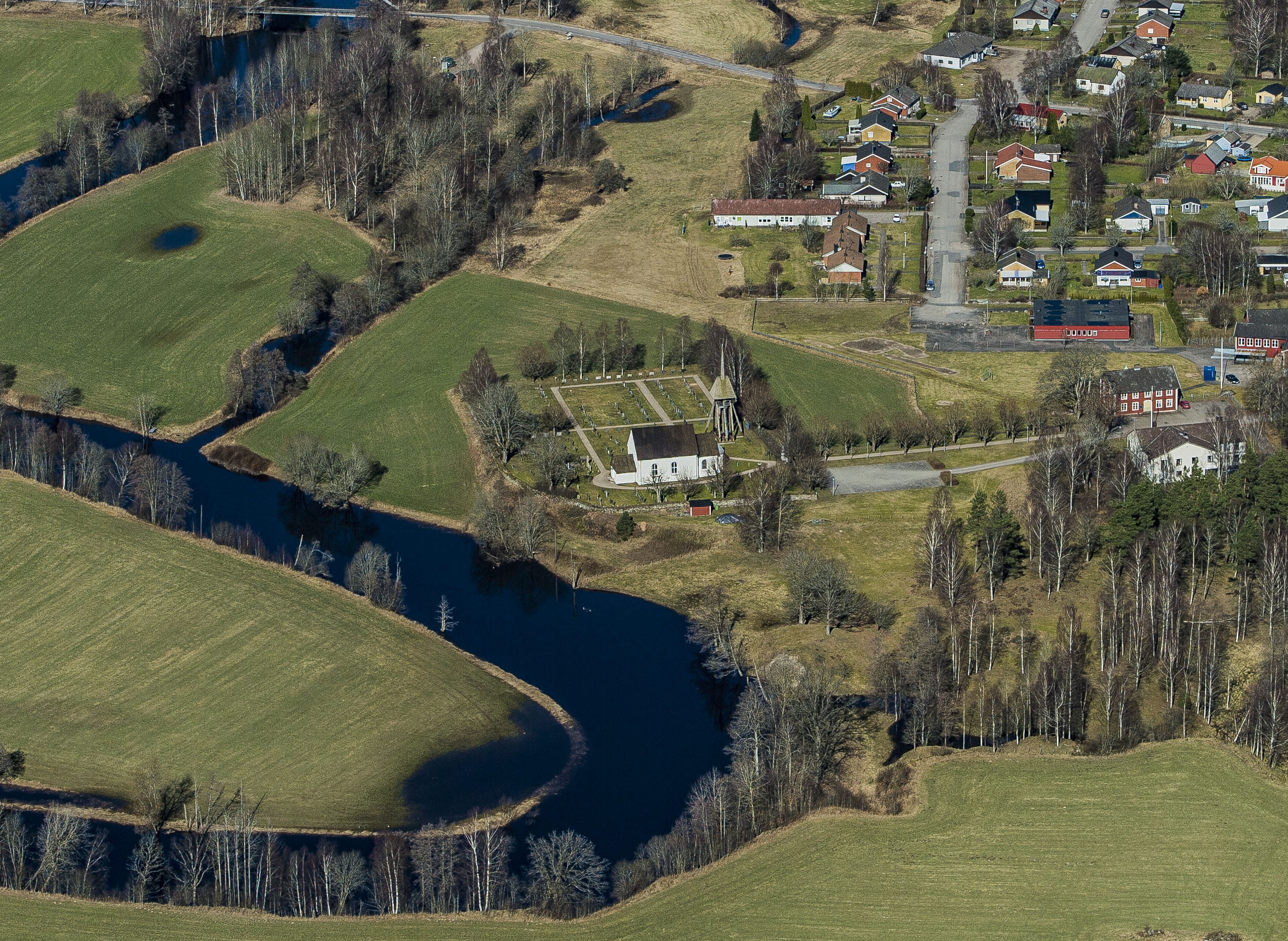
- Kånna with the parish church in the center.

- Location within Kronoberg Location within Sweden
- Coordinates: 56°47′N 13°54′E
- Country: Sweden
- Province: Småland
- County: Kronoberg County
- Municipality: Ljungby Municipality

Area
  - Total: 0.43 km^{2} (0.17 sq mi)

Population (31 December 2010)
  - Total: 352
  - Density: 823/km^{2} (2,130/sq mi)
- Time zone: UTC+1 (CET)
  - Summer (DST): UTC+2 (CEST)

Kånna is a locality situated in Ljungby Municipality, Kronoberg County, Sweden with 352 inhabitants in 2010.

The name Kånna is guessed to mean "swamp". In this area during the Iron Age people used to settle on higher grounds where it was drier. There have been found Viking burial places and settlements by archaeologists which all are located on higher grounds. During the 18th century there was a church together with a village in Kånna. In 1890 there was a railroad made through the area which was part of "Skåne-Smålands Järnväg".

In late 2015, politicians in Ljungby laid plans to make accommodation for refugees in the old school building in Kånna, which had been disused since 2011. Shortly after, the old school building was burned down in a fire. The fire began at ~1:00 a.m. on Saturday, October 17, 2015.
