= Vittaryd =

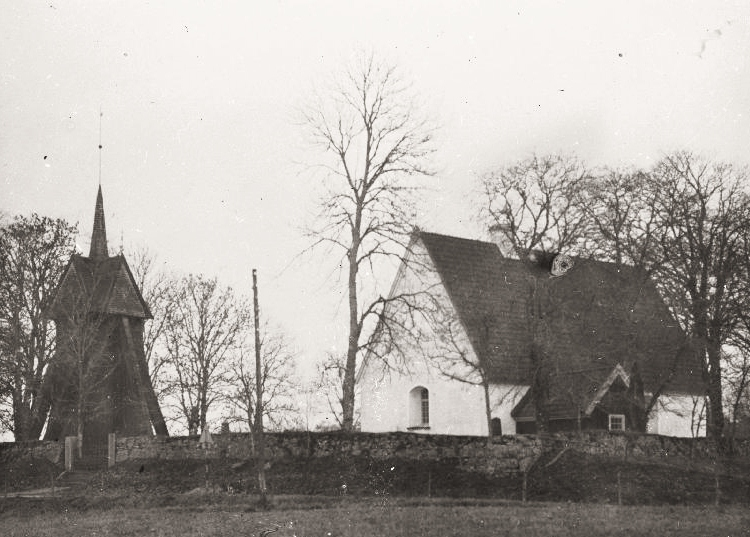

- Location within Kronoberg Location within Sweden
- Coordinates: 56°58′16″N 13°56′42″E
- Country: Sweden
- Province: Småland
- County: Kronoberg County
- Municipality: Ljungby Municipality

Area
  - Total: 0.71 km^{2} (0.27 sq mi)

Population (31 December 2010)
  - Total: 318
  - Density: 448/km^{2} (1,160/sq mi)
- Time zone: UTC+1 (CET)
  - Summer (DST): UTC+2 (CEST)

Vittaryd is a locality situated in Ljungby Municipality, Kronoberg County, Sweden with 318 inhabitants in 2010.

Several of the older houses in the centre of the village predate the industrialisation of Europe. Currently, however, economic activity is concentrated on manufacturing, with a house door factory and a car parts plant as the two largest employers.

== Education ==
The town has a school, which was threatened with closure as part of a plan to reduce the number of rural schools to balance the municipality's budget. By February 2025, an agreement was reached which allowed Vittaryd's school to continue operating.
