= Sövestad Runestones =

Two stones in Skåne County, Sweden

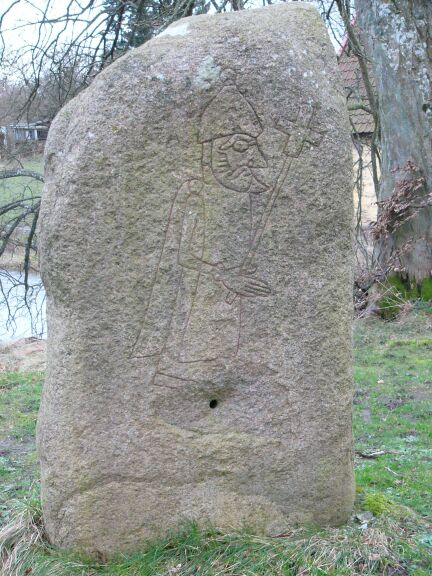
The Sövestad 1 stone depicts a man holding a cross.

The Sövestad Runestones consist of a Viking Age image stone and memorial runestone found near Krageholm Castle, which is about two kilometers west of Sövestad, Skåne County, Sweden.

== Sövestad 1 ==
Sövestad 1, which is listed as DR 290 in the Rundata catalog, consists of a depiction of a man holding a cross on a pole. There are no runes carved on this stone. The inscription on the granite stone, which is 1.65 meters (5 ft 5 in) in height, was discovered in 1756 on the castle grounds when the stone was turned over. The remains of a sword were also found under the stone. Both of the Sövestad 1 and 2 stones are today raised at the castle.

Although located in Sweden, both of the Sövestad stones were given Danish Rundata designations because Scania was part of the historical Denmark.

== Sövestad 2 ==
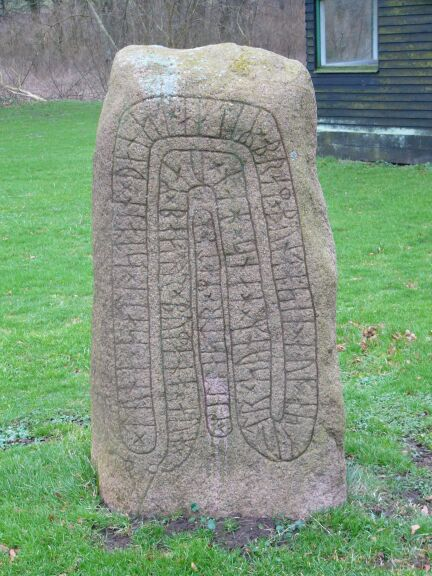
The Sövestad 2 stone

The inscription on Sövestad 2, which is listed as DR 291 in the Rundata catalog, consists of runic text in the younger futhark carved within a serpent that curves to make four text frames and within a separate inner text band. The inscription is classified as being carved in runestone style Fp, which is the classification for inscriptions with text bands with serpent or beast heads depicted as seen from above. The granite stone, which is 1.5 meters (4 ft 11 in) in height, was discovered with the inscription side down in a grove near a lake on the castle grounds in 1757.

The runic text indicates that the stone was raised as a memorial to a man named Bramr by his wife Tonna and son Asgotr. Bramr is described as being bæztr bomanna or "best of estate-holders" and mildastr mataʀ or "most generous with food". This description is consistent with generosity with food and feasting being a mark of power and renown in Viking Age Scandinavia. Several other runestones also note persons who are generous with food, including inscription U 739 in Gådi, which similar to DR 291 describes a man as mildr mataʀ or "generous with food", Sm 37 in Rörbro which uses yndr mataʀ or "liberal with food", and Sm 39 in Ryssby, Sm 44 in Ivla, Sö 130 in Hagstugan, U 703 in Väppeby, and U 805 in Fröslunda, where men are described using a form of matar góðan or "free with food".

=== Inscription ===
==== Transliteration of the runes into Latin characters ====
× tuna × sati × stain × þansi × aftiʀ × bram × bunta : sin × auk × askutr × sunʀ × hans × han × uaʀ × bastr × bumana × auk × ¶ × miltastr × mataʀ

==== Transcription into Old Norse ====
Tonna satti sten þænsi æftiʀ Bram, bonda sin, ok Asgotr, sunʀ hans. Han waʀ bæztr bomanna ok mildastr mataʀ.

==== Translation in English ====
Tonna placed this stone in memory of Bramr, her husbandman, and (so did) Ásgautr, his son. He was the best of estate-holders and the most generous with food.

== Sövestad 3 ==
Descriptions from the 1800s suggest that there was a third Sövestad stone, which has been given the designation DR 292, which was located near a gate in a fence, but this stone either has been lost or never existed. Any inscription that may have been on this stone was not recorded.
