= Halta-Kajsa =

Kajsa (Catarina) (1792, Agunnaryd - 1857), known as Halta-Kajsa (Limp-Kajsa), was a Swedish story teller and tradition bearer. She was an important co-worker and source of information of Gunnar Olof Hyltén-Cavallius in his work of collecting old Swedish fairy tales and folk songs. Kajsa was illegitimate and therefore had no last name, and is in literature known and referred to by her nickname, Halta-Kajsa.

== Life ==
She was born in the country parish of Agunnaryd in Småland as the illegitimate daughter of the farmhand Ingjerd Svensdotter by an unknown father, although the farmer Anders Persson was unofficially pointed out as her father, and grew up with her mother and maternal grandparents in a cottage reserved for the parish destitute. She married her foster brother Johan Jönsson (1800-1842) in 1822 and lived her married life in Århult; despite their poverty, the family are described as cultivated within literature. As a widow she became a crofter in Tumhult.

Gunnar Olof Hyltén-Cavallius met her in 1845, and found her to have an immense knowledge about old legends, folk songs, fairy tales and stories, and she was one of his most important assistants and sources in his work in collecting and documenting them. He also had her edit his manuscripts as consultant. To enable him to move with him to Stockholm as his assistant consultant, he employed her in 1848, officially however as a nurse maid for his daughter.
