= Angelstad =

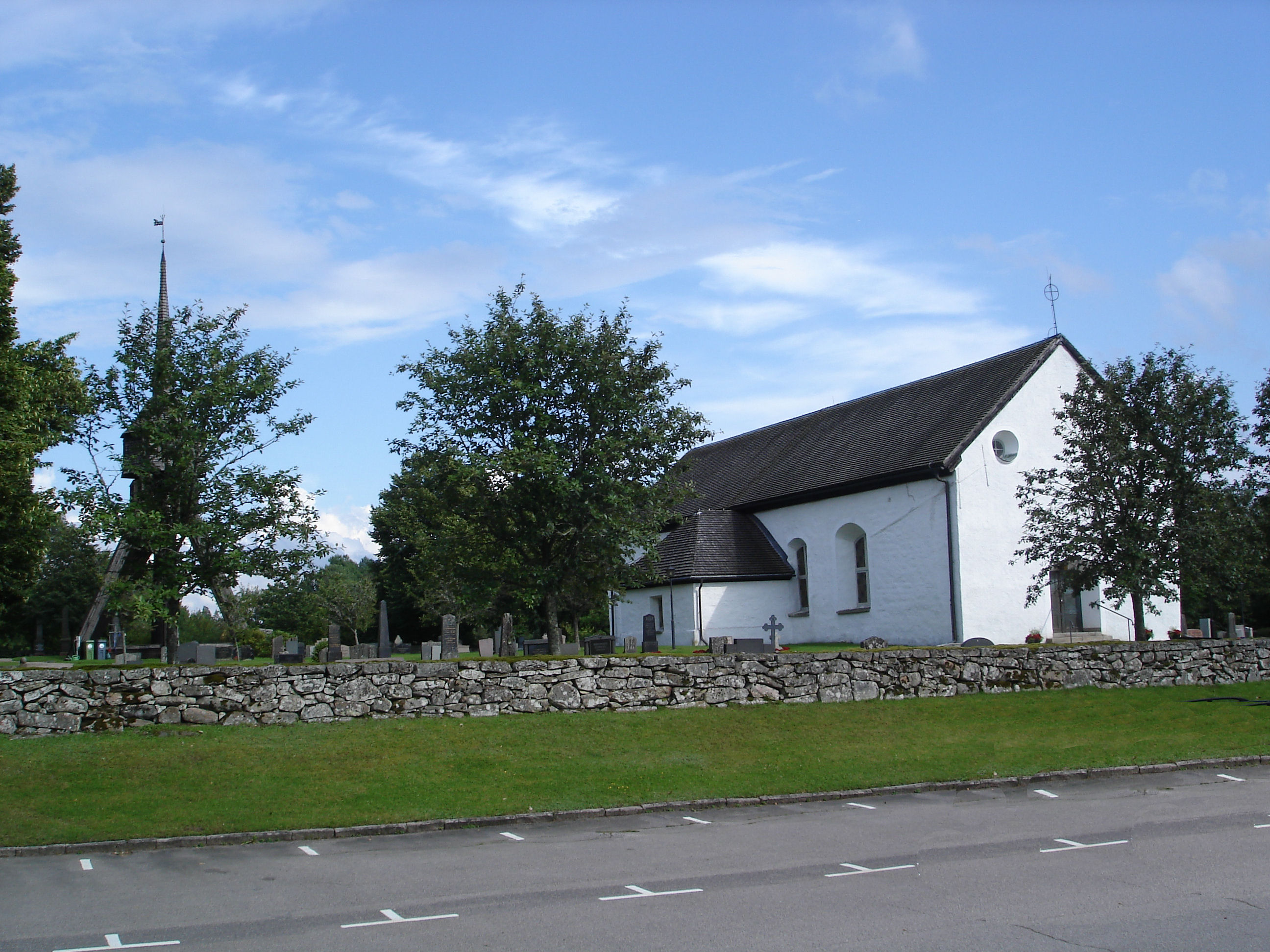
- Angelstad church

- Location within Kronoberg Location within Sweden
- Coordinates: 56°50′N 13°45′E
- Country: Sweden
- Province: Småland
- County: Kronoberg County
- Municipality: Ljungby Municipality

Area
  - Total: 0.48 km^{2} (0.19 sq mi)

Population (31 December 2010)
  - Total: 271
  - Density: 562/km^{2} (1,460/sq mi)
- Time zone: UTC+1 (CET)
  - Summer (DST): UTC+2 (CEST)

Angelstad is a locality situated in Ljungby Municipality, Kronoberg County, Sweden with 271 inhabitants in 2010.
