= Jönköping and Kronoberg County =

17th century county in Sweden

Jönköping and Kronoberg County Jönköpings och Kronobergs län
- County of the Swedish Empire
- 1634–1636; 1654–1658; 1669–1674; 1680–1687
- Flag
- History
  - Established: 1634
  - Disestablished: 1687
Preceded by	Succeeded by
Jönköping County; Jönköping County	Jönköping County; Kronoberg County

Jönköping and Kronoberg County, or Jönköpings och Kronobergs län was a county of the Swedish Empire in several periods from 1634 to 1687. It was ultimately split into the Jönköping County and the Kronoberg County.
