= Agunnaryd =

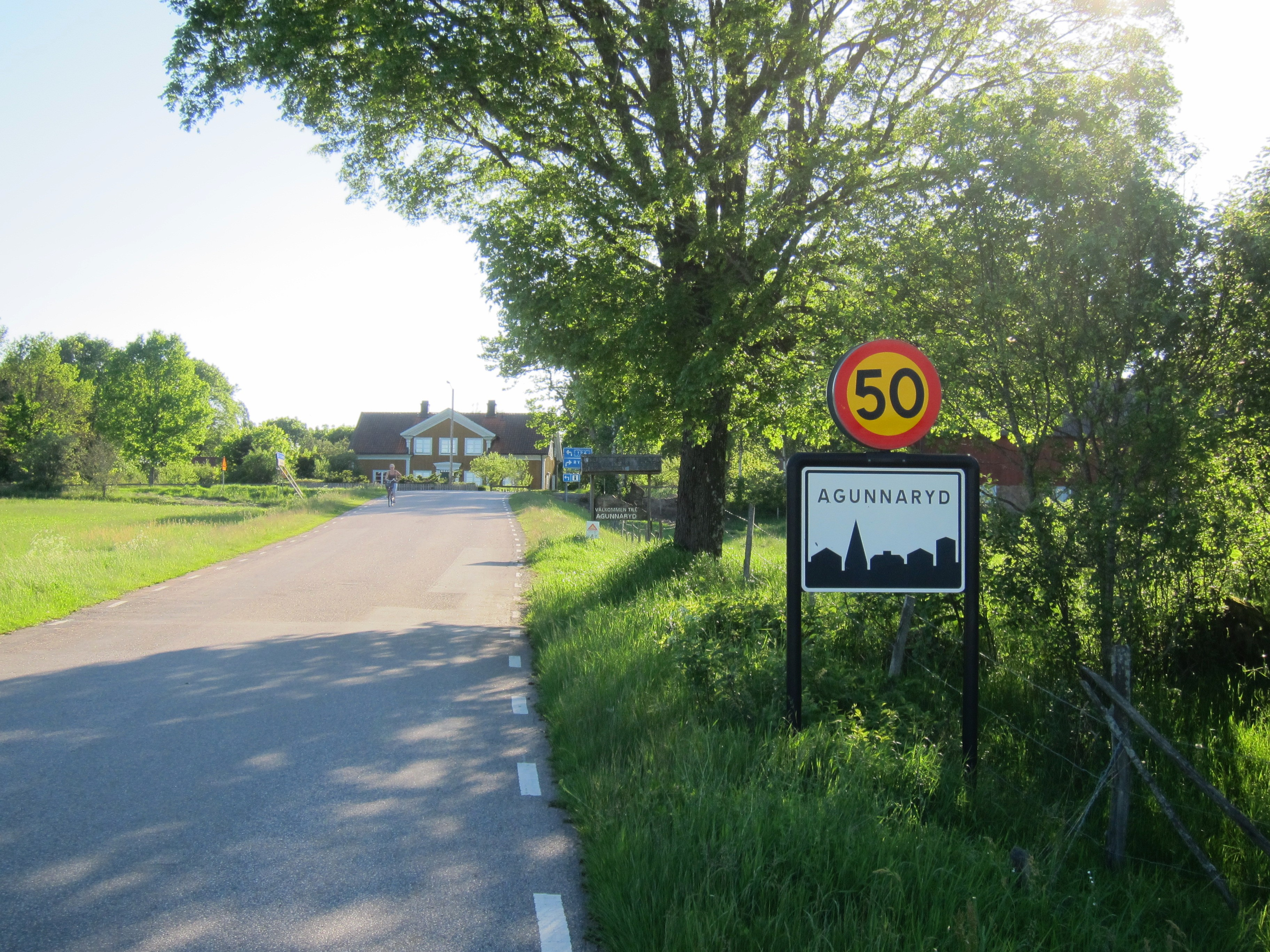
- Agunnaryd

- Location within Kronoberg Location within Sweden
- Coordinates: 56°44′51″N 14°08′41″E
- Country: Sweden
- Province: Småland
- County: Kronoberg County
- Municipality: Ljungby Municipality

Area
  - Total: 0.40 km^{2} (0.15 sq mi)

Population (31 December 2010)
  - Total: 220
  - Density: 544/km^{2} (1,410/sq mi)
- Time zone: UTC+1 (CET)
  - Summer (DST): UTC+2 (CEST)
- Website: www.agunnaryd.se

Agunnaryd is a locality and a parish situated in Ljungby Municipality, Kronoberg County, Sweden with 220 inhabitants in 2010.

Agunnaryd is chiefly associated with the industrialist Ingvar Kamprad, who founded IKEA (the A of which stands for Agunnaryd). It has one school, a kindergarten, a small supermarket named 'Matöppet', and four football teams. The little village has its own newspaper/newsletter, Agunnaryds Allehanda, that is mailed to inhabitants once a month.

The nearby lake of Agunnarydsjön, located some 300 meters from the village church, is a haven for fishing and swimming. The lake is part of the Helge å river system, extending further down into the lake of Möckeln, south of Agunnaryd.

The village's vicinity offers plenty of opportunities to experience Swedish nature, e.g. 12,000 acres (49 km^{2}) of forest, ideally suited for hiking. The bicycle-route Sverigeleden passes right through the village. Canoeing on Helge å is a popular activity among tourists. In Agunnaryd, there are "lay-bys" by the stream to be used by canoeists.

In 2014 Ingvar Kamprad donated 53 million SEK (~US$7million) to the parish, for them to use at their discretion.

== Notable people ==
- Halta-Kajsa
- Ingvar Kamprad
