= Ljungby Municipality =

Ljungby Municipality Ljungby kommun
- Municipality
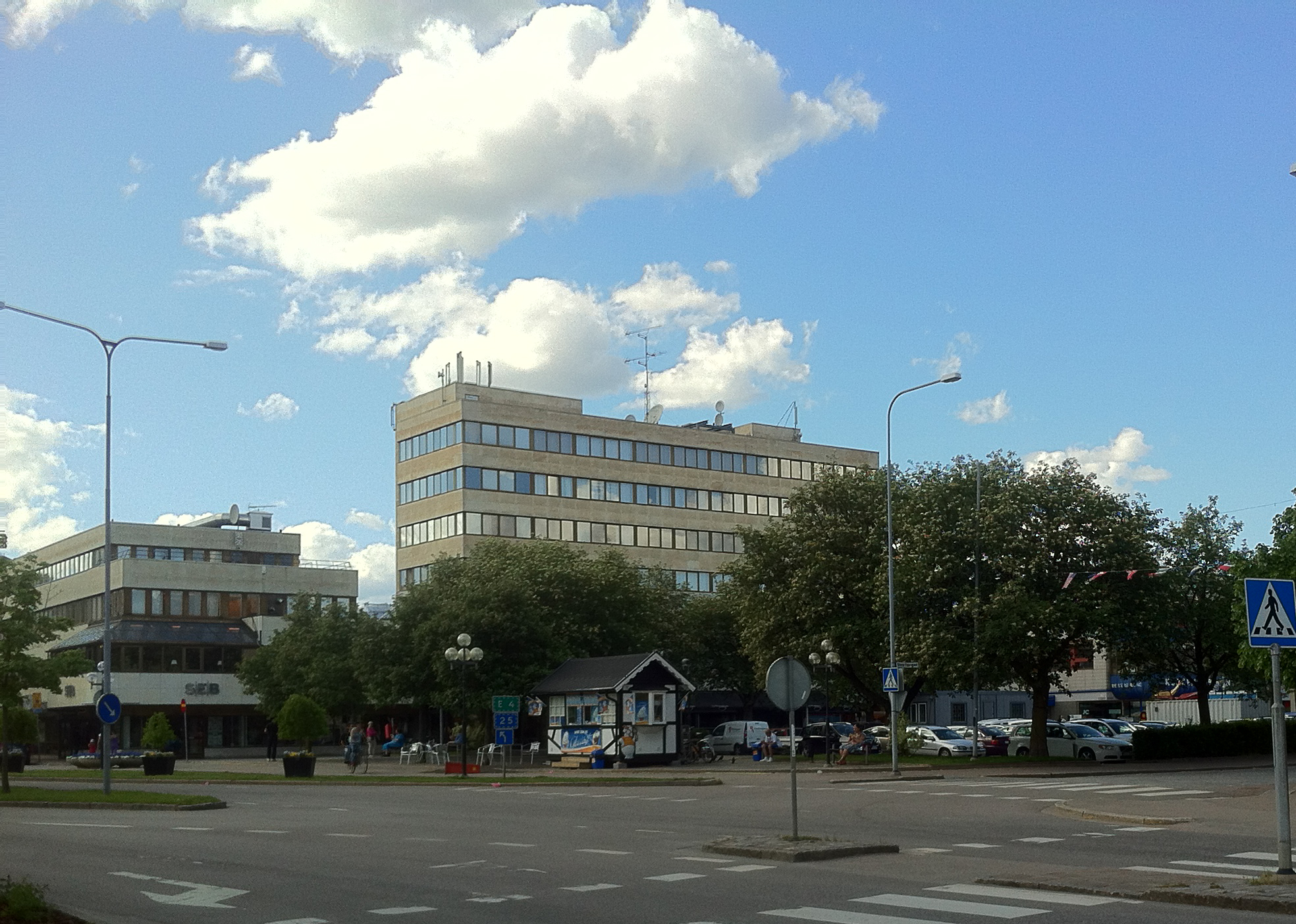

- Coat of arms

- Coordinates: 56°50′N 13°56′E
- Country: Sweden
- County: Kronoberg County
- Seat: Ljungby

Area
  - Total: 1,994.9833 km^{2} (770.2674 sq mi)
  - Land: 1,747.7533 km^{2} (674.8113 sq mi)
  - Water: 247.23 km^{2} (95.46 sq mi)
- Area as of 1 January 2014.

Population (30 June 2025)
  - Total: 28,305
  - Density: 16.195/km^{2} (41.945/sq mi)
- Time zone: UTC+1 (CET)
  - Summer (DST): UTC+2 (CEST)
- ISO 3166 code: SE
- Province: Småland
- Municipal code: 0781
- Website: www.ljungby.se

Ljungby Municipality (Swedish: Ljungby kommun) is a municipality in Kronoberg County, southern Sweden, where the town Ljungby is seated.

In 1971 the City of Ljungby (1936-1970) was amalgamated with the rural municipalities surrounding it, thus creating the present municipality. In 1974 a minor adjustment of the boundaries took place. There are 19 original entities within the area.

== Geography ==
Ljungby Municipality contains a little more plains than average in Småland. Lakes, forests and plains are never far away. The tenth largest lake in Sweden, Bolmen, is located in the north-western part of the municipality. The town Ljungby is visited by thousands of tourists, mainly from Germany, every summer.

=== Localities ===
There are 8 urban areas (also called a tätort or locality) in Ljungby Municipality.

In the table the localities are listed according to the size of the population as of 31 December 2005. The municipal seat is in bold characters.

#	Locality	Population
1	**Ljungby**	14,810
2	Lagan	1,751
3	Ryssby	689
4	Lidhult	635
5	Kånna	365
6	Vittaryd	306
7	Angelstad	276
8	Agunnaryd	215

The town of Hamneda and the small village of Bohok are also located within Ljungby Municipality.

== Demographics ==
This is a demographic table based on Ljungby Municipality's electoral districts in the 2022 Swedish general election sourced from SVT's election platform, in turn taken from SCB official statistics.

In total there were 28,396 inhabitants, including 21,191 Swedish citizens of voting age. 40.8% voted for the left coalition and 57.9% for the right coalition. Indicators are in percentage points except population totals and income.

Location	Residents	Citizen adults	Left vote	Right vote	Employed	Swedish parents	Foreign heritage	Income SEK	Degree
Location			%	%					
Agunnaryd	1,281	928	34.4	64.4	87	85	15	26,298	31
Angelstad	1,418	1,136	38.1	61.1	85	90	10	27,200	36
Astrad	1,721	1,255	43.9	55.0	84	76	24	26,695	37
Berga V	1,323	949	35.3	63.5	81	79	21	24,490	28
Berga Ö	1,386	1,062	36.3	62.7	85	82	18	25,011	30
Ekebacken	1,318	998	45.2	53.6	88	84	16	27,583	33
Hammaren	1,678	1,292	44.3	53.2	75	65	35	22,727	31
Hamneda	1,532	1,113	32.6	65.6	83	81	19	24,156	29
Hjortsberg V	1,468	1,201	45.1	53.6	72	62	38	20,581	28
Hjortsberg Ö	1,696	1,199	51.3	47.9	73	51	49	22,648	27
Kungshög V	1,675	1,185	44.1	54.2	80	73	27	24,221	32
Kungshög Ö	1,644	1,311	44.6	54.0	77	70	30	24,008	36
Lidhult	1,213	848	41.2	57.6	70	72	28	21,362	30
Ljungsätra	1,604	1,297	42.7	56.5	79	75	25	23,095	35
Ryssby	1,704	1,246	41.4	57.5	82	85	15	25,613	34
Stensberg	1,697	1,235	37.7	61.1	86	76	24	26,758	32
Sunnerbo	1,886	1,323	42.0	57.1	91	79	21	30,182	44
Torpa	734	556	29.8	67.4	80	84	16	21,975	29
Vittaryd-Bolmsö	1,418	1,057	38.4	60.3	82	81	19	25,401	35
Source: SVT

== History ==
Ljungby Municipality traces its history back to the Viking Age. Vikings followed the river Lagan and lived in its vicinity, and one of the locations were in what is now Ljungby Municipality.

In the 14th century several important medieval roads went through the municipality. In that century, an inn was established, and this was to form the center of Ljungby town.

During the 19th century the area closest to Ljungby itself consisted mostly of sand without any vegetation, and the government released funds to plant trees which would tie together the sand and make it suitable for plants.

== Sister cities ==
The following cities are twinned with Ljungby:

- Ås, Akershus fylke, Norway
- Paimio, Southwest Finland, Finland
- Šilutė, Klaipėda County, Lithuania

== Notability ==
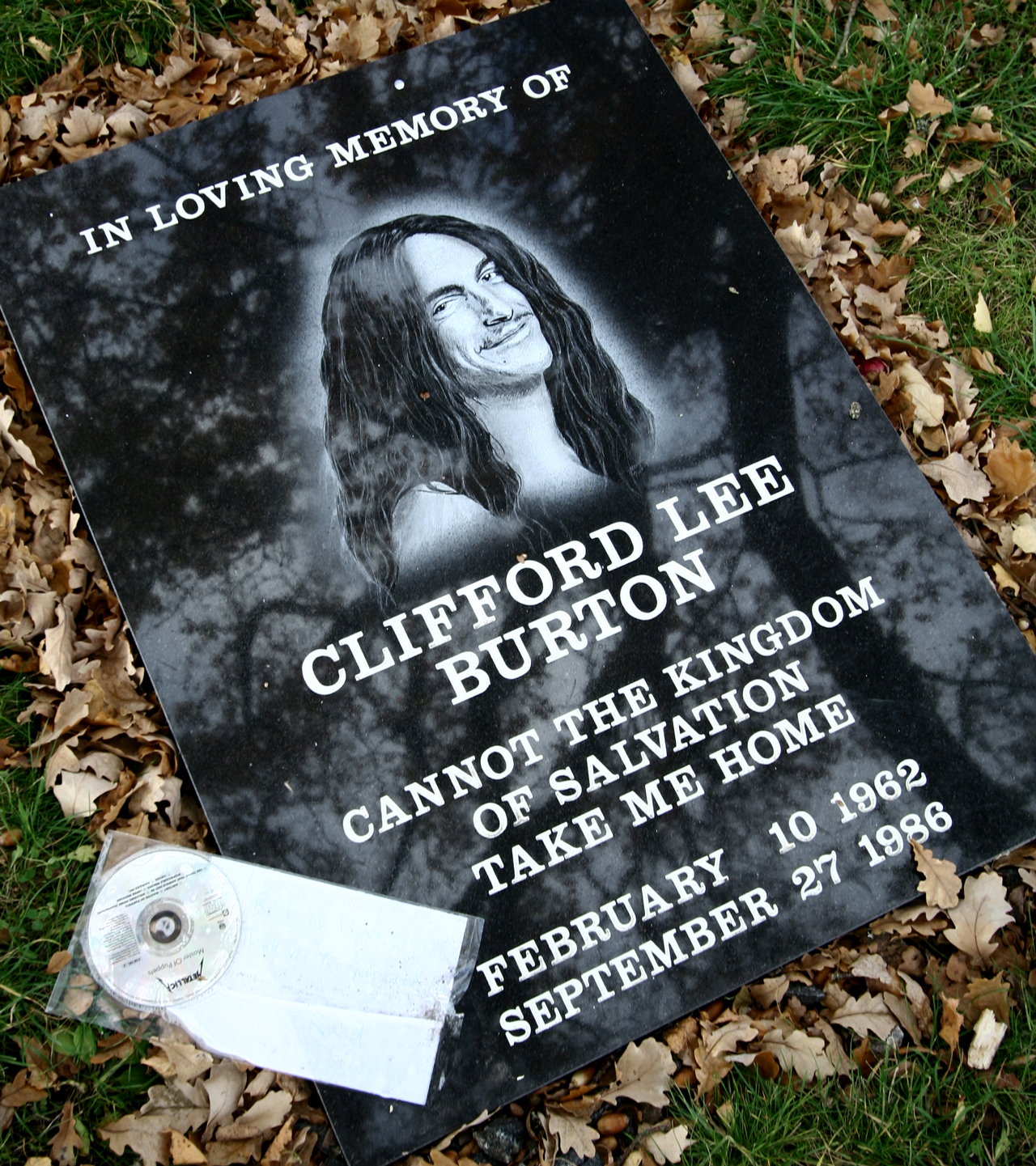
Memorial stone near the crash site.

- The opera singer Christina Nilsson was discovered while performing at the Ljungby market in 1857.
- Metallica bassist Cliff Burton died on a highway within the municipality when the band's tour bus overturned on 27 September 1986.

=== Born here ===
- Eskil Erlandsson born in Torpa 1957. Former chairman of the Swedish Defence Committee (2002-2006) and current Agriculture ministry(2006-).
- John Lind, Governor of Minnesota (1899–1901), born in Kånna parish.
- Olof Johansson (b. 1931), politician, former president of the Swedish Centre Party.
- Peter Westerstrøm, mass murderer executed in Norway in 1809.
