= Lagan (Sweden) =

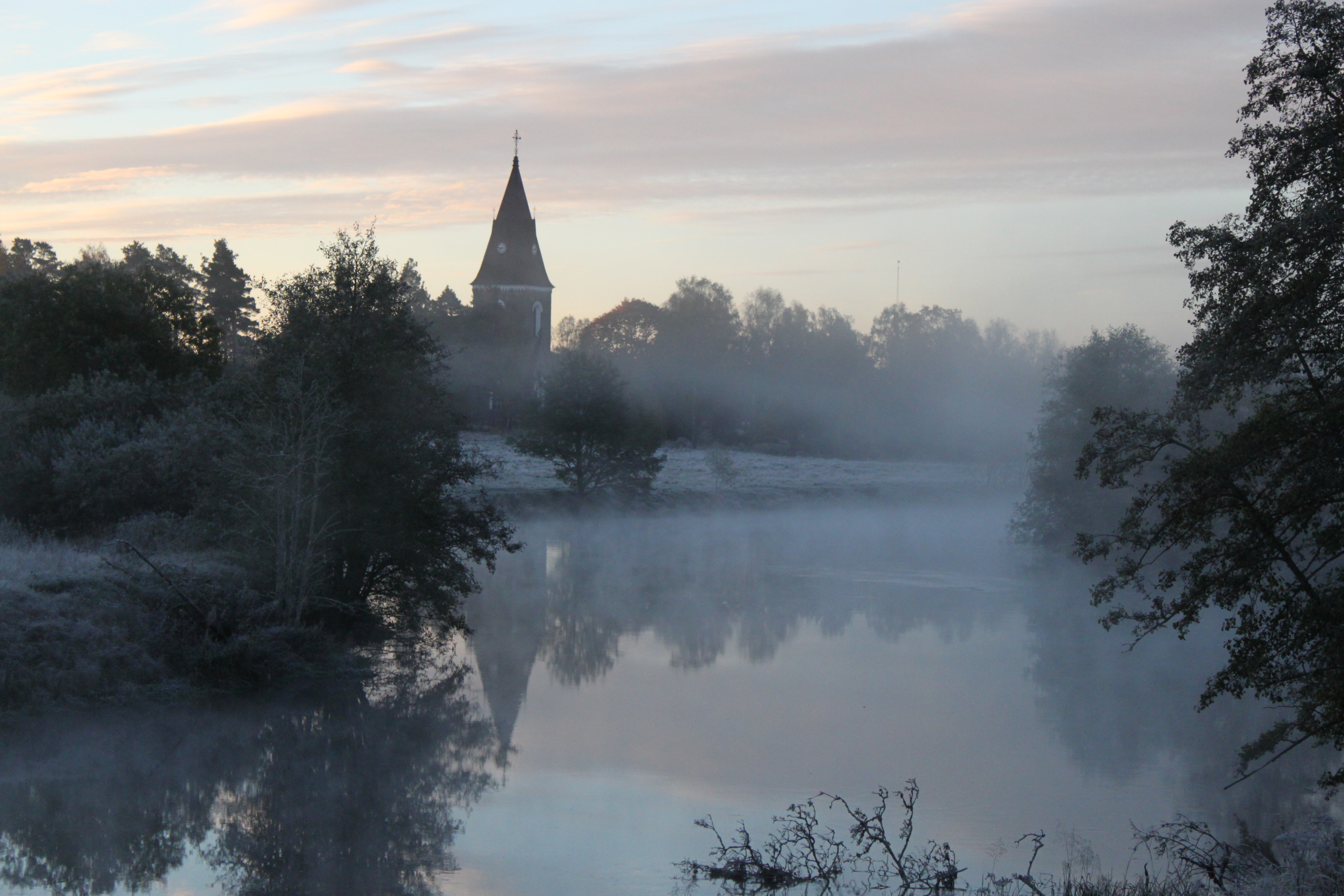
- Lagan and Hamneda Church in October 2010

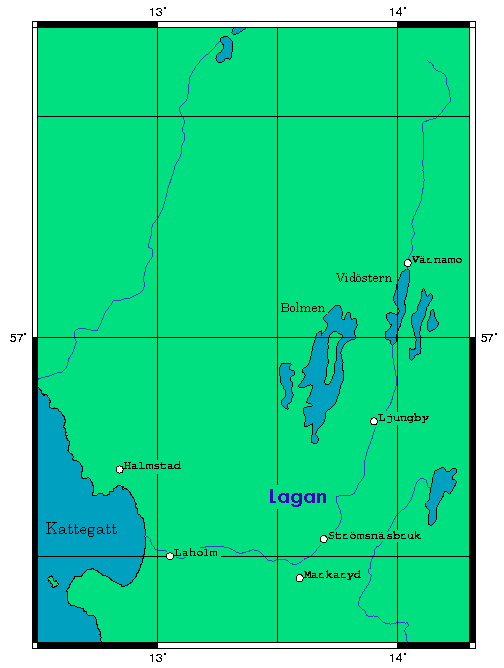

Location
- Country: Sweden

Physical characteristics
- Source: Tahesjön
  - location: Jönköping Municipality, Sweden
- Mouth: Laholmsbukten, Kattegat
  - coordinates: 56°32′55″N 12°56′50″E
  - elevation: 0 m (0 ft)
- Length: 244 km (152 mi)
- Basin size: 6,451.8 km^{2} (2,491.1 sq mi)
- Discharge
  - average: 82 m^{3}/s (2,900 cu ft/s)

The Lagan is one of four main westcoast rivers in south-western Sweden besides Göta älv. It is 244 kilometers and is one of the longest rivers in southern Sweden.

It starts in Tahesjön near Taberg in the municipality of Jönköping, flows through Vaggeryd, Värnamo and Ljungby and ends in the town of Mellbystrand in the municipality of Laholm. More specifically, it ends in the Bay of Laholm, a part of the strait of Kattegat.

People have been following the river from the coastal areas since the Viking Age and settling in its vicinity. Along Lagan was a trading route, the so-called Lagastigen ("the Lagan path"), which is now part of the road E4.

The straight middle and upper course of Lagan follows a branch of the Protogine Zone —a zone of crustal weakness in western Sweden.

== See also ==
- The other three main Halland rivers: Viskan, Ätran, Nissan
- Lagan, a town located by the river some 10 kilometers north of Ljungby
