= Ryssby =

- Location within Kronoberg Location within Sweden
- Coordinates: 56°52′N 14°10′E
- Country: Sweden
- Province: Småland
- County: Kronoberg County
- Municipality: Ljungby Municipality

Area
  - Total: 1.10 km^{2} (0.42 sq mi)

Population (31 December 2010)
  - Total: 707
  - Density: 645/km^{2} (1,670/sq mi)
- Time zone: UTC+1 (CET)
  - Summer (DST): UTC+2 (CEST)

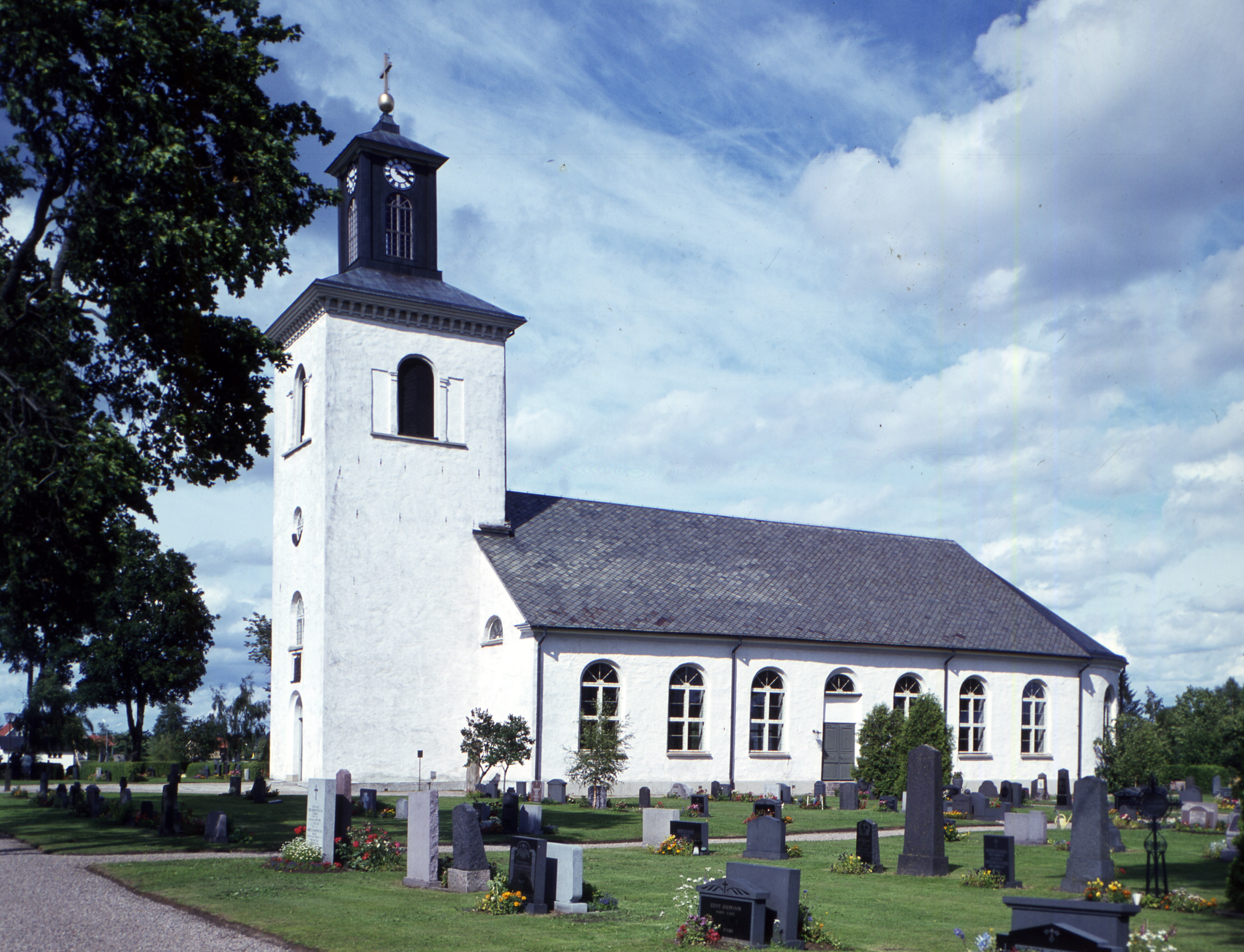
Ryssby's church, Sweden, 1970

Ryssby is a locality situated in Ljungby Municipality, Kronoberg County, Sweden with 707 inhabitants in 2010. It is situated at an altitude of 313 metres (1030 feet). Ryssby lies on the north end of the Ryssby Lake.

Ryssby Church has the greatest church in Ljungby Municipality, with up to 300 seats.

== See also ==
- Småland Runic Inscription 39
