= Lagan, Sweden =

Lagan
- Location within Kronoberg Location within Sweden
- Coordinates: 56°55′N 13°59′E
- Country: Sweden
- Province: Småland
- County: Kronoberg County
- Municipality: Ljungby Municipality

Area
  - Total: 2.73 km^{2} (1.05 sq mi)

Population (31 December 2010)
  - Total: 1,744
  - Density: 639/km^{2} (1,660/sq mi)
- Time zone: UTC+1 (CET)
  - Summer (DST): UTC+2 (CEST)

Lagan is the second largest locality situated in Ljungby Municipality, Kronoberg County, Sweden, with 1,744 inhabitants in 2010. It is at an altitude of 139 meters (459 feet). It has got its name from the river Lagan, which passes nearby.
