= Kronoberg County =

County (län) of Sweden

Kronoberg County Kronobergs län (Swedish)
- County of Sweden
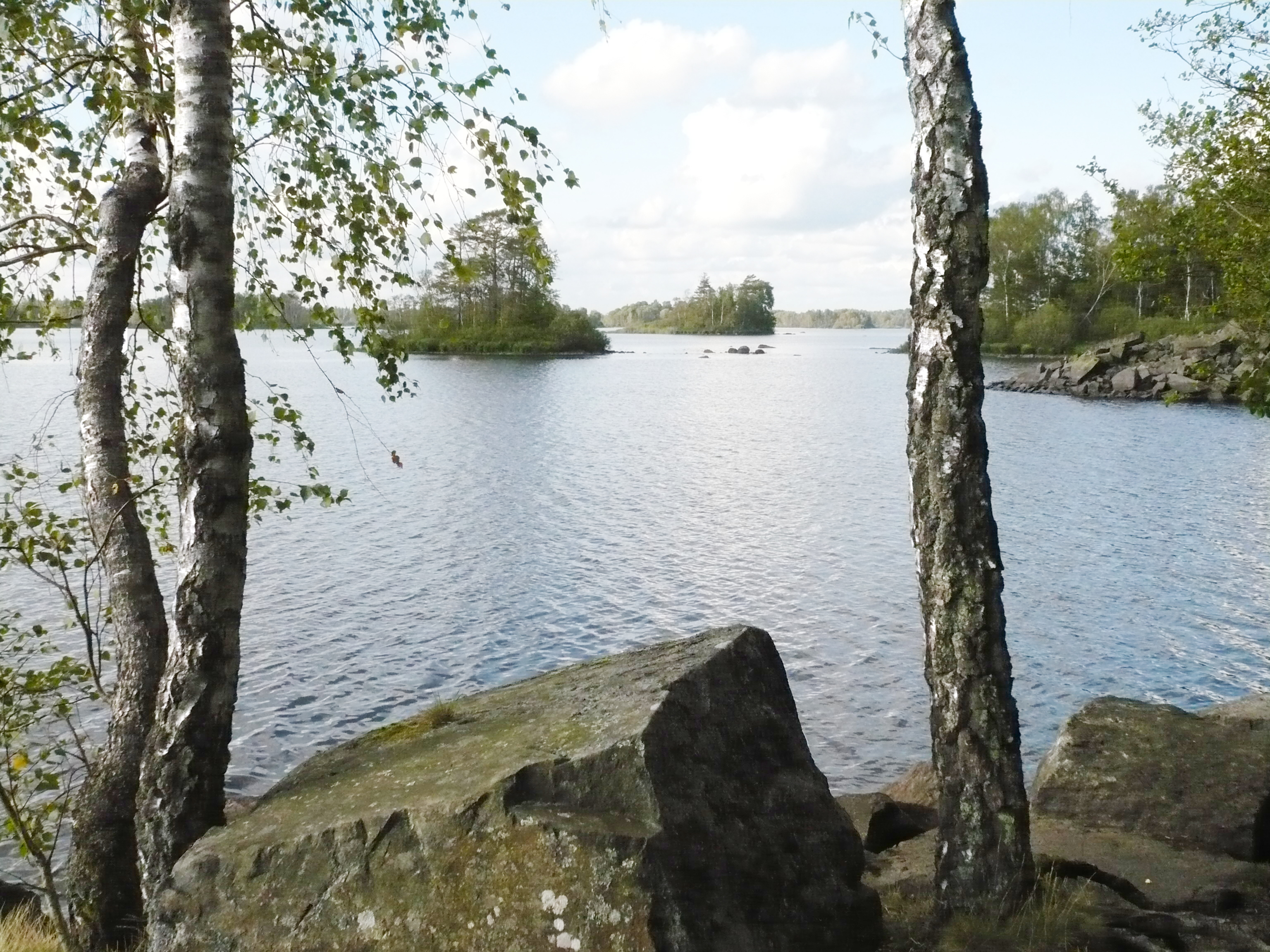
- Taxås Nature Reserve, Möcklen Lake

- Flag Coat of arms

- Kronoberg County in Sweden

- Location map of Kronoberg County in Sweden
- Country: Sweden
- Established: 1674
- Capital: Växjö
- Municipalities: 8: Älmhult; Alvesta; Lessebo; Ljungby; Markaryd; Tingsryd; Uppvidinge; Växjö

Government
  - Governor: Maria Arnholm (Liberals)
  - Council: Region Kronoberg

Area
  - Total: 8,466 km^{2} (3,269 sq mi)

Population (31 December 2023)
  - Total: 203,686
  - Density: 24.06/km^{2} (62.31/sq mi)

GDP
  - Total: SEK 76 billion €8.103 billion (2015)
- Time zone: UTC+1 (CET)
  - Summer (DST): UTC+2 (CEST)
- ISO 3166 code: SE-G
- NUTS Region: SE212
- Website: www.g.lst.se

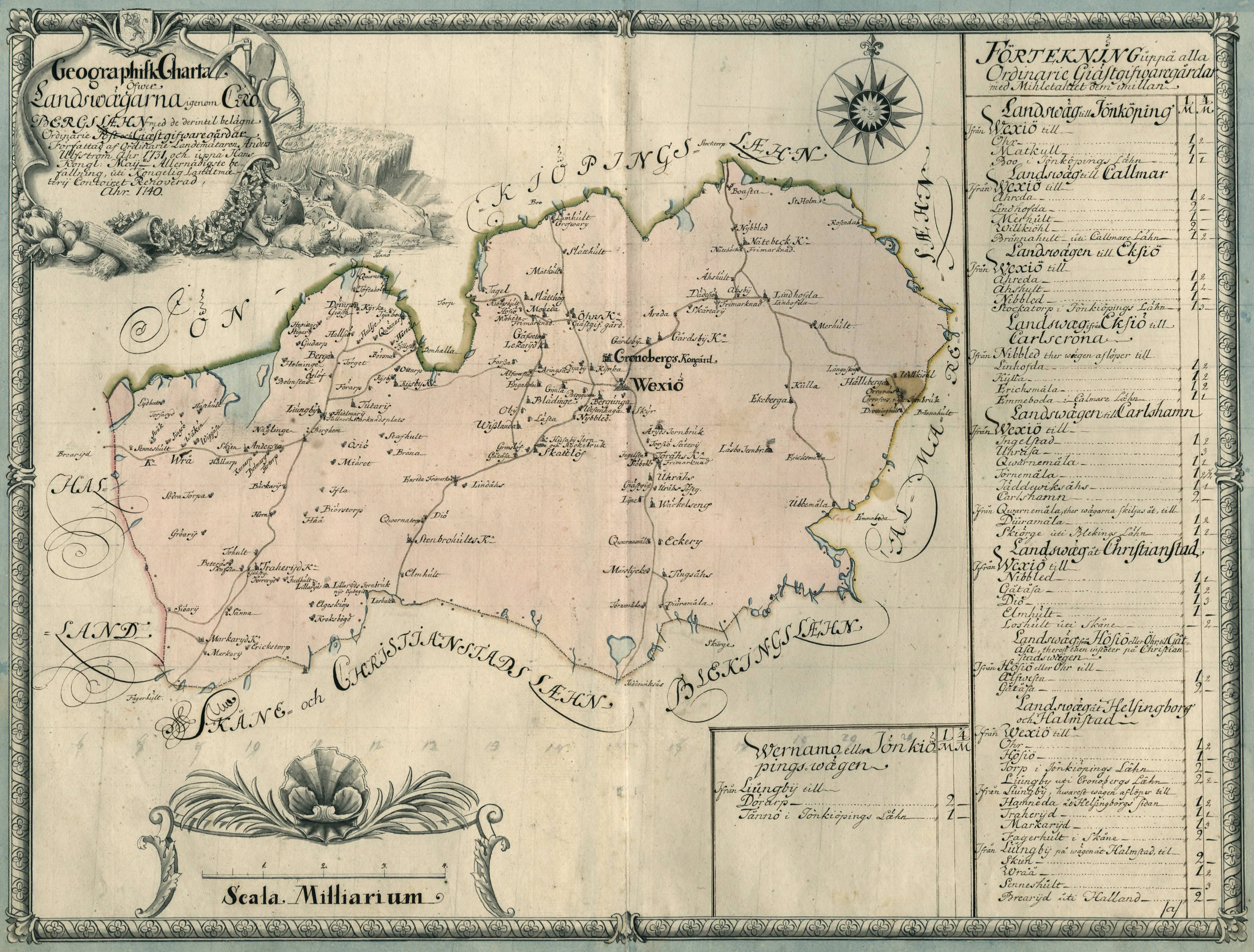
Map of the country roads through Kronoberg county in 1731.

Kronoberg County (Swedish: Kronobergs län, pronounced [ˈkrûːnʊˌbærjs ˌlɛːn]; is a county or län in southern Sweden. Kronoberg is one of three counties in the province of Småland. It borders the counties of Skåne, Halland, Jönköping, Kalmar, and Blekinge. Its capital is the city of Växjö. While Kronoberg is an inland county, the southernmost fringes are about 20 kilometres (12 mi) from the coastline.

== Province ==
Geographically, Kronoberg County is situated in the southern part of the province of Småland. It received its present borders in 1687 when Jönköping County was separated from the former Jönköping and Kronoberg County.

== Administration ==
The seat of residence for the Governor or landshövding is Växjö. The Governor is the head of the County Administrative Board or länsstyrelsen. The County Administrative Board is a Government Agency headed by a Governor. The current Governor is Kristina Alsér who took over the office from Lars-Åke Lagrell.

== Politics ==
The County Council of Kronoberg or Landstinget Kronoberg.

== Riksdag elections ==
The table details all Riksdag election results of Kronoberg County since the unicameral era began in 1970. The blocs denote which party would support the Prime Minister or the lead opposition party towards the end of the elected parliament.

Year	Turnout	Votes	V	S	MP	C	L	KD	M	SD	NyD	Left	Right
1970	88.4	103,021	4.0	39.1		30.0	11.5	2.1	13.2			43.1	54.7
1973	91.0	107,136	4.0	38.8		34.7	5.7	1.7	14.8			42.8	55.2
1976	92.2	113,411	3.5	37.6		34.2	7.6	1.4	15.4			41.1	57.2
1979	91.0	113,467	4.2	38.1		27.2	8.1	1.4	20.6			42.3	55.9
1982	91.4	115,714	4.3	41.1	1.6	23.9	4.0	1.9	23.1			45.4	51.0
1985	90.0	115,825	4.3	40.9	1.4	20.8	11.5		21.0			45.2	53.2
1988	86.6	112,094	4.7	41.1	5.2	18.5	9.3	3.9	17.1			54.1	44.8
1991	87.7	114,359	3.9	34.5	3.1	14.9	6.8	8.8	19.5		7.5	38.3	50.0
1994	87.6	115,735	5.8	42.6	4.8	13.3	5.4	4.8	21.5		0.9	53.2	45.0
1998	82.3	108,852	10.7	36.5	4.1	9.6	2.9	14.4	20.1			51.4	47.1
2002	80.9	107,726	7.3	40.6	4.0	10.9	9.8	10.9	14.1	1.7		51.9	45.7
2006	82.8	111,327	4.9	36.0	4.2	11.3	5.7	7.9	24.7	3.5		45.1	49.6
2010	85.1	116,513	4.6	30.5	6.1	9.9	5.7	6.1	29.8	6.4		41.2	51.6
2014	86.7	120,775	4.5	32.4	5.4	9.1	3.4	5.0	21.9	15.6		42.4	39.4
2018	88.2	124,570	6.1	29.6	3.2	9.4	3.5	7.6	19.2	20.3		48.2	50.5
2022	85.5	126,385	3.5	31.0	3.5	6.1	3.1	6.8	19.5	23.6		44.1	53.0

== Municipalities ==
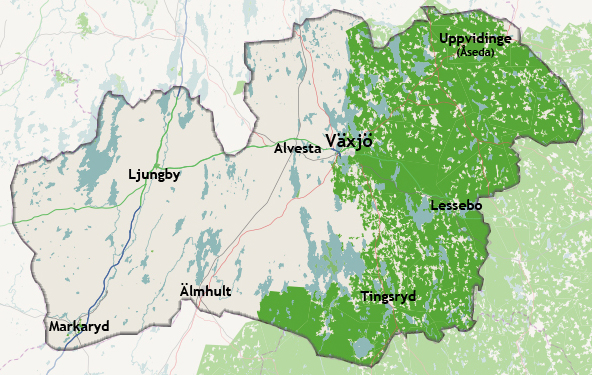

- Alvesta
- Lessebo
- Ljungby
- Markaryd
- Tingsryd
- Uppvidinge
- Växjö
- Älmhult

Note that all the municipalities have names after their seats except Uppvidinge, where the seat is located in the small town Åseda.

== Localities in order of size ==
The five most populous localities of Kronoberg County in 2020:

#	Locality	Population
1	Växjö	71,282
2	Ljungby	16,098
3	Älmhult	11,003
4	Alvesta	9,255
5	Markaryd	5,123

== Demographics ==
=== Foreign background ===
SCB have collected statistics on backgrounds of residents since 2002. These tables consist of all who have two foreign-born parents or are born abroad themselves. The chart lists election years and the last year on record alone.

Location	2002	2006	2010	2014	2018	2019
Alvesta	10.8	12.1	15.5	20.9	25.2	25.9
Lessebo	10.9	13.4	17.2	23.9	31.6	31.6
Ljungby	12.1	13.6	16.2	19.0	23.2	23.7
Markaryd	14.2	16.5	19.0	21.8	28.9	29.7
Tingsryd	7.5	9.1	11.3	14.4	18.4	19.0
Uppvidinge	10.5	13.4	15.8	20.0	25.5	26.5
Växjö	12.5	14.9	18.6	21.1	24.4	25.2
Älmhult	10.1	12.6	16.2	19.9	29.2	30.3
Total	11.6	13.7	17.0	19.0	25.0	25.7
Source: SCB

== Heraldry ==
Kronoberg was formally granted its arms in 1944. However, use of the arms was already an established practice. It is a variation of the arms of Småland. Blazon: "In a field of gold on a green three tipped mountain, a red lion with blue armament stands upright, holding with both front paws a vertically aligned red crossbow with a black bow and arrow of silver."
