= Kronoberg County (Riksdag constituency) =

Constituency of the Riksdag, the national legislature of Sweden

- Kronobergs Län
- Constituency for the Riksdag
- Location of Kronoberg County within Sweden
- County: Kronoberg
- Population: 203,122 (2025)
- Electorate: 151,714 (2026)
- Area: 9,424 km^{2} (2026)

Current constituency
- Created: 1970
- Seats: List (Note: Constituency seats only.): 6 (1985–present); 7 (1982–1985); 6 (1970–1982)
- Member of the Riksdag: List: Ann-Christine Frohm (SD); Monica Haider (S); Mattias Karlsson Bergman (SD); Robert Olesen (S); Thomas Ragnarsson (M); Oliver Rosengren (M)
- Created from: Kronoberg County

Kronoberg County (Swedish: Kronobergs Län) is one of the 29 multi-member constituencies of the Riksdag, the national legislature of Sweden. The constituency was established in 1970 when the Riksdag changed from a bicameral legislature to a unicameral legislature. It is conterminous with the county of Kronoberg. The constituency currently elects six of the 349 members of the Riksdag using the open party-list proportional representation electoral system. At the 2026 general election it had 151,714 registered electors.

== Electoral system ==
Kronoberg County currently elects six of the 349 members of the Riksdag using the open party-list proportional representation electoral system. Constituency seats are allocated using the modified Sainte-Laguë method. Only parties that reach the 4% national threshold and parties that receive at least 12% of the vote in the constituency compete for constituency seats. Supplementary levelling seats may also be allocated at the constituency level to parties that reach the 4% national threshold.

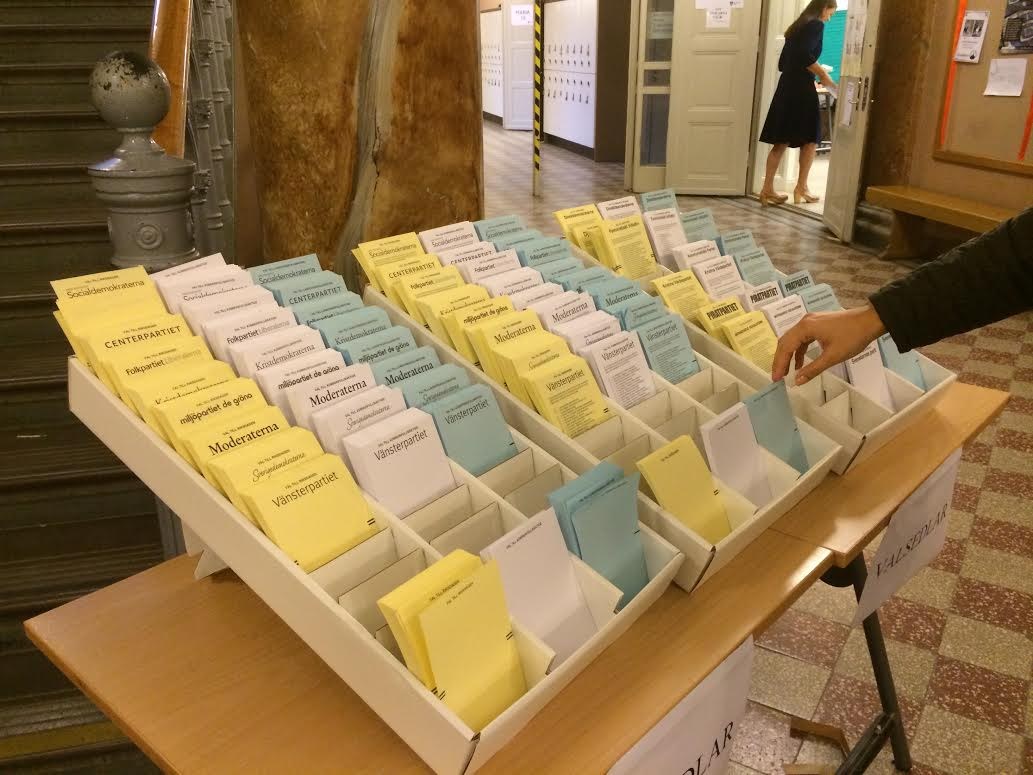
A selection of ballot papers available for voters at the 2014 general election in Stockholm - yellow for the Riksdag, blue for the regional council and white for the municipal council

Prior to 1997 voters could cast any ballot paper they wanted, though it had to contain the name of a party and the name of at least one candidate nominated by that party in the constituency. It was common for parties to hand out ballot papers with their name and list of candidates at the entrance of polling stations. Voters could delete the names of candidates or write-in the names of other candidates but in practice these options weren't used enough by voters to have any significant impact on the results and consequently elections operated as a closed system.

Since 1997, elections in Sweden follow the French model in having separate ballot papers for each party/list in a constituency. There are two ballot papers for each party - a party ballot paper (partivalsedel) with just the name of the party and a name ballot paper (namnvalsedel) with the name of the party and its list of candidates. There are also blank ballot papers (blank valsedel). Voters can initially pick as many ballot papers as they wish and then, in the secrecy of the voting booth, they select a single ballot paper of their choice. If they chose a name ballot paper they have the option of casting a preferential vote for one of their chosen party's candidates. If they chose a blank ballot paper they can write the name of any party including unregistered parties and, optionally, they can write the name of any person as their preferred candidate, even one that does not belong to their chosen party. They then place their chosen ballot paper in an envelope which is placed in the ballot box, discarding all other ballot papers they picked.

Seats won by each party/list in a constituency are allocated to its candidates in order of preference votes (a personal mandate), provided that the candidate has received at least 8% of votes cast for their party in the constituency (5% since January 2011). Any unfilled seats are then allocated to the party's remaining candidates in the order they appear on the party list (a party mandate).

== Election results ==
=== Summary ===
Election	Left V / VPK			Social Democrats S			Greens MP			Centre C			Liberals L / FP / F			Moderates M			Christian Democrats KD / KDS			Sweden Democrats SD		
Election	Votes	%	Seats	Votes	%	Seats	Votes	%	Seats	Votes	%	Seats	Votes	%	Seats	Votes	%	Seats	Votes	%	Seats	Votes	%	Seats
2026	9,798	7.62%	0	35,565	27.67%	2	5,714	4.45%	0	8,008	6.23%	0	5,626	4.38%	0	25,662	19.96%	2	10,256	7.98%	0	26,144	20.34%	2
2022	6,281	5.03%	0	38,712	30.97%	2	4,338	3.47%	0	7,559	6.05%	0	3,897	3.12%	0	24,390	19.51%	2	8,451	6.76%	0	29,516	23.61%	2
2018	7,531	6.05%	0	36,817	29.56%	2	4,020	3.23%	0	11,712	9.40%	1	4,383	3.52%	0	23,893	19.18%	1	9,418	7.56%	0	25,258	20.28%	2
2014	5,459	4.52%	0	39,179	32.44%	2	6,559	5.43%	0	10,988	9.10%	1	4,109	3.40%	0	26,453	21.90%	2	5,983	4.95%	0	18,820	15.58%	1
2010	5,380	4.62%	0	35,555	30.52%	3	7,044	6.05%	0	11,559	9.92%	1	6,667	5.72%	0	34,762	29.84%	2	7,111	6.10%	0	7,424	6.37%	0
2006	5,481	4.92%	0	40,056	35.98%	3	4,695	4.22%	0	12,562	11.28%	1	6,381	5.73%	0	27,454	24.66%	2	8,824	7.93%	0	3,840	3.45%	0
2002	7,864	7.30%	0	43,696	40.56%	3	4,354	4.04%	0	11,746	10.90%	1	10,538	9.78%	0	15,200	14.11%	1	11,695	10.86%	1	1,808	1.68%	0
1998	11,677	10.73%	1	39,739	36.51%	3	4,514	4.15%	0	10,457	9.61%	0	3,200	2.94%	0	21,859	20.08%	1	15,726	14.45%	1			
1994	6,689	5.78%	0	49,337	42.63%	3	5,533	4.78%	0	15,409	13.31%	1	6,246	5.40%	0	24,906	21.52%	2	5,522	4.77%	0			
1991	4,413	3.86%	0	39,430	34.48%	3	3,555	3.11%	0	16,994	14.86%	1	7,769	6.79%	0	22,277	19.48%	2	10,091	8.82%	0			
1988	5,297	4.73%	0	46,083	41.11%	3	5,878	5.24%	0	20,732	18.50%	1	10,387	9.27%	1	19,149	17.08%	1	4,409	3.93%	0			
1985	4,992	4.31%	0	47,352	40.88%	3	1,632	1.41%	0	24,039	20.75%	1	13,281	11.47%	1	24,309	20.99%	1	with C					
1982	4,980	4.30%	0	47,507	41.06%	3	1,884	1.63%	0	27,642	23.89%	2	4,680	4.04%	0	26,695	23.07%	2	2,205	1.91%	0			
1979	4,757	4.19%	0	43,285	38.15%	3				30,827	27.17%	2	9,172	8.08%	0	23,418	20.64%	1	1,565	1.38%	0			
1976	4,012	3.54%	0	42,638	37.60%	3				38,737	34.16%	2	8,600	7.58%	0	17,506	15.44%	1	1,624	1.43%	0			
1973	4,300	4.01%	0	41,575	38.81%	3				37,144	34.67%	2	6,106	5.70%	0	15,879	14.82%	1	1,866	1.74%	0			
1970	4,111	3.99%	0	40,323	39.14%	2				30,915	30.01%	2	11,813	11.47%	1	13,598	13.20%	1	2,120	2.06%	0			

(Excludes levelling seats. Figures in italics represent alliances/joint lists.)

=== Detailed ===
Party has received at least 4% of the vote nationally and is entitled to compete for constituency seats.

==== 2020s ====
===== 2026 =====
Results of the 2026 general election held on 13 September 2026:

Party		Votes per municipality								Total votes	%	Seats		
Party		Älm- hult	Al- vesta	Lesse- bo	Ljung- by	Marka- ryd	Tings- ryd	Uppvi- dinge	Växjö	Total votes	%	Con.	Lev.	Tot.
Swedish Social Democratic Party	S	2,899	3,289	1,643	4,392	1,365	1,895	1,334	18,748	35,565	27.67%	2	0	2
Sweden Democrats	SD	2,139	3,080	1,028	4,386	1,836	2,073	1,547	10,055	26,144	20.34%	2	0	2
Moderate Party	M	2,190	2,351	846	3,054	986	1,436	851	13,948	25,662	19.96%	2	0	2
Christian Democrats	KD	765	961	324	2,064	703	661	514	4,264	10,256	7.98%	0	0	0
Left Party	V	595	837	499	1,011	350	366	350	5,790	9,798	7.62%	0	0	0
Centre Party	C	772	741	251	1,079	253	499	369	4,044	8,008	6.23%	0	0	0
Green Party	MP	439	470	169	570	122	210	160	3,574	5,714	4.45%	0	0	0
Liberals	L	383	501	150	783	222	291	206	3,090	5,626	4.38%	0	0	0
Örebro Party	ÖP	50	63	9	61	16	30	26	303	558	0.43%	0	0	0
Alternative for Sweden	AfS	36	43	19	98	18	44	33	254	545	0.42%	0	0	0
Christian Values Party	KrVP	16	10	2	32	22	10	9	43	144	0.11%	0	0	0
Ambition Sweden	AS	12	20	8	22	6	5	3	64	140	0.11%	0	0	0
Citizens' Coalition	MED	7	6	2	26	2	5	5	54	107	0.08%	0	0	0
Pirate Party	PP	6	13	2	11	2	6	2	39	81	0.06%	0	0	0
Human Rights and Democracy	MoD	6	15	5	12	2	6	2	15	63	0.05%	0	0	0
Communist Party of Sweden	SKP	11	2	1	5	3	2	2	12	38	0.03%	0	0	0
Direct Democrats	DD	1	1	0	0	1	0	1	10	14	0.01%	0	0	0
United Voice	ER	0	0	0	2	2	0	2	7	13	0.01%	0	0	0
Turning Point Party	PV	0	0	0	5	1	0	0	3	9	0.01%	0	0	0
Volt Sweden	Volt	1	3	0	0	0	0	0	5	9	0.01%	0	0	0
Communist Party	K	0	0	0	3	0	0	0	5	8	0.01%	0	0	0
RegleraAI.nu		0	0	0	0	0	0	0	8	8	0.01%	0	0	0
Unity	ENH	1	0	0	2	1	0	0	3	7	0.01%	0	0	0
Independent Rural Party	LPo	1	0	1	1	1	0	2	0	6	0.00%	0	0	0
Nordic Resistance Movement	NMR	0	1	0	0	0	0	0	4	5	0.00%	0	0	0
The Push Buttons	Kn	0	0	0	2	0	1	1	0	4	0.00%	0	0	0
A Good Sweden		0	0	0	1	0	0	1	0	2	0.00%	0	0	0
Donald Duck Party		0	0	0	1	0	0	0	1	2	0.00%	0	0	0
New Allance		0	0	0	0	0	0	0	2	2	0.00%	0	0	0
99 Black Balloons		0	0	0	0	0	0	0	1	1	0.00%	0	0	0
AI Party		1	0	0	0	0	0	0	0	1	0.00%	0	0	0
Architecture Uprising Party		0	0	0	0	0	0	0	1	1	0.00%	0	0	0
Classical Liberal Party	KLP	0	0	0	0	0	0	0	1	1	0.00%	0	0	0
Electoral Cooperation Party		0	0	0	0	0	0	0	1	1	0.00%	0	0	0
Evil Chicken Party	OKP	0	0	1	0	0	0	0	0	1	0.00%	0	0	0
For the Good of All		0	0	0	0	0	0	0	1	1	0.00%	0	0	0
Nuance Party	Pny	0	0	0	0	0	0	0	1	1	0.00%	0	0	0
Viking		0	0	0	0	0	0	0	1	1	0.00%	0	0	0
Valid votes		10,331	12,407	4,960	17,623	5,914	7,540	5,420	64,352	128,547	100.00%	6	0	6
Blank votes		93	124	55	229	61	75	81	511	1,229	0.95%			
Rejected votes – unregistered parties		2	0	1	3	1	1	1	9	18	0.01%			
Rejected votes – other		5	8	2	21	0	4	1	36	77	0.06%			
Total polled		10,431	12,539	5,018	17,876	5,976	7,620	5,503	64,908	129,871	85.60%			
Registered electors		12,335	14,839	5,914	21,383	7,332	8,985	6,527	74,399	151,714				
Turnout		84.56%	84.50%	84.85%	83.60%	81.51%	84.81%	84.31%	87.24%	85.60%				

The following candidates were elected:

- Constituency seats (personal mandates) - Oliver Rosengren (M), 5,361 votes.
- Constituency seats (party mandates) - Ann-Christine Frohm (SD), 9 votes; Monica Haider (S), 1,265 votes; Mattias Karlsson (SD), 182 votes; Robert Olesen (S), 473 votes; and Thomas Ragnarsson (M), 729 votes.

===== 2022 =====
Results of the 2022 general election held on 11 September 2022:

Party		Votes per municipality								Total votes	%	Seats		
Party		Älm- hult	Al- vesta	Lesse- bo	Ljung- by	Marka- ryd	Tings- ryd	Uppvi- dinge	Växjö	Total votes	%	Con.	Lev.	Tot.
Swedish Social Democratic Party	S	3,265	3,544	1,822	5,098	1,615	2,113	1,540	19,715	38,712	30.97%	2	0	2
Sweden Democrats	SD	2,510	3,472	1,283	4,977	2,136	2,539	1,772	10,827	29,516	23.61%	2	0	2
Moderate Party	M	1,986	2,195	774	3,415	924	1,196	913	12,987	24,390	19.51%	2	0	2
Christian Democrats	KD	711	891	296	1,363	574	648	434	3,534	8,451	6.76%	0	0	0
Centre Party	C	674	764	233	985	236	495	365	3,807	7,559	6.05%	0	0	0
Left Party	V	400	505	336	660	191	303	231	3,655	6,281	5.03%	0	0	0
Green Party	MP	301	318	124	445	87	187	121	2,755	4,338	3.47%	0	0	0
Liberals	L	272	292	81	432	108	160	127	2,425	3,897	3.12%	0	0	0
Nuance Party	PNy	29	119	21	19	24	5	29	342	588	0.47%	0	0	0
Alternative for Sweden	AfS	21	37	11	66	16	20	12	163	346	0.28%	0	0	0
Citizens' Coalition	MED	14	17	10	20	3	7	5	126	202	0.16%	0	0	0
The Push Buttons	Kn	16	17	2	28	6	13	4	48	134	0.11%	0	0	0
Christian Values Party	KrVP	9	9	1	29	25	20	1	27	121	0.10%	0	0	0
Pirate Party	PP	7	8	2	9	4	15	6	44	95	0.08%	0	0	0
Human Rights and Democracy	MoD	6	3	4	18	4	12	0	37	84	0.07%	0	0	0
Independent Rural Party	LPo	5	9	1	21	9	2	14	12	73	0.06%	0	0	0
Feminist Initiative	FI	4	5	2	4	4	1	4	20	44	0.04%	0	0	0
Unity	ENH	0	5	3	6	1	1	1	19	36	0.03%	0	0	0
Direct Democrats	DD	5	2	0	2	1	4	1	15	30	0.02%	0	0	0
Nordic Resistance Movement	NMR	0	1	0	2	1	0	2	11	17	0.01%	0	0	0
Climate Alliance	KA	2	3	1	0	0	1	0	8	15	0.01%	0	0	0
Basic Income Party	BASIP	2	0	0	1	0	0	1	10	14	0.01%	0	0	0
Turning Point Party	PV	2	2	0	1	0	0	0	6	11	0.01%	0	0	0
Communist Party of Sweden	SKP	2	5	0	0	0	2	0	1	10	0.01%	0	0	0
Classical Liberal Party	KLP	1	0	0	1	0	1	1	5	9	0.01%	0	0	0
Donald Duck Party		1	2	0	0	0	0	1	1	5	0.00%	0	0	0
Electoral Cooperation Party		0	0	0	0	0	0	0	3	3	0.00%	0	0	0
Freedom Party		2	0	0	0	0	0	0	1	3	0.00%	0	0	0
Hard Line Sweden		0	0	0	0	0	0	0	3	3	0.00%	0	0	0
Socialist Welfare Party	S-V	0	1	0	0	0	0	1	0	2	0.00%	0	0	0
Political Shift		0	0	0	1	0	0	0	0	1	0.00%	0	0	0
Sweden Out of the EU/ Free Justice Party		0	0	0	1	0	0	0	0	1	0.00%	0	0	0
Volt Sweden	Volt	0	0	0	0	0	0	0	1	1	0.00%	0	0	0
Valid votes		10,247	12,226	5,007	17,604	5,969	7,745	5,586	60,608	124,992	100.00%	6	0	6
Blank votes		96	107	63	223	62	66	73	541	1,231	0.97%			
Rejected votes – unregistered parties		0	2	2	4	2	2	3	11	26	0.02%			
Rejected votes – other		10	16	7	25	2	6	6	64	136	0.11%			
Total polled		10,353	12,351	5,079	17,856	6,035	7,819	5,668	61,224	126,385	85.45%			
Registered electors		12,132	14,578	5,962	21,191	7,356	9,188	6,679	70,824	147,910				
Turnout		85.34%	84.72%	85.19%	84.26%	82.04%	85.10%	84.86%	86.45%	85.45%				

The following candidates were elected:

- Constituency seats (personal mandates) - Tomas Eneroth (S), 2,332 votes; and Oliver Rosengren (M), 4,428 votes.
- Constituency seats (party mandates) - Monica Haider (S), 1,241 votes; Mattias Karlsson (SD), 344 votes; Katja Nyberg (SD), 11 votes; and Thomas Ragnarsson (M), 1,203 votes.

Permanent substitutions:

- Tomas Eneroth (S) resigned on 14 April 2025 and was replaced by Robert Olesen (S) on 15 April 2025.

==== 2010s ====
===== 2018 =====
Results of the 2018 general election held on 9 September 2018:

Party		Votes per municipality								Total votes	%	Seats		
Party		Älm- hult	Al- vesta	Lesse- bo	Ljung- by	Marka- ryd	Tings- ryd	Uppvi- dinge	Växjö	Total votes	%	Con.	Lev.	Tot.
Swedish Social Democratic Party	S	2,976	3,532	1,903	5,115	1,615	2,153	1,653	17,870	36,817	29.56%	2	0	2
Sweden Democrats	SD	2,148	3,100	1,098	4,228	1,883	2,136	1,505	9,160	25,258	20.28%	2	0	2
Moderate Party	M	1,879	2,191	676	3,364	986	1,233	838	12,726	23,893	19.18%	1	0	1
Centre Party	C	1,121	1,125	360	1,687	372	918	681	5,448	11,712	9.40%	1	0	1
Christian Democrats	KD	710	916	270	1,533	632	659	421	4,277	9,418	7.56%	0	0	0
Left Party	V	487	617	355	886	187	380	337	4,282	7,531	6.05%	0	0	0
Liberals	L	340	351	126	551	109	141	127	2,638	4,383	3.52%	0	0	0
Green Party	MP	300	322	123	448	94	158	97	2,478	4,020	3.23%	0	0	0
Alternative for Sweden	AfS	17	52	14	62	13	31	23	167	379	0.30%	0	0	0
Feminist Initiative	FI	20	30	16	40	13	24	10	189	342	0.27%	0	0	0
Citizens' Coalition	MED	9	16	5	27	4	9	11	85	166	0.13%	0	0	0
Independent Rural Party	LPo	27	13	3	42	23	13	18	23	162	0.13%	0	0	0
Direct Democrats	DD	10	4	3	14	11	7	2	55	106	0.09%	0	0	0
Unity	ENH	6	18	2	16	2	6	5	48	103	0.08%	0	0	0
Pirate Party	PP	9	7	2	12	5	2	1	32	70	0.06%	0	0	0
Christian Values Party	KrVP	4	9	0	21	15	2	2	11	64	0.05%	0	0	0
Animal Party	DjuP	1	3	1	4	0	2	1	19	31	0.02%	0	0	0
Classical Liberal Party	KLP	0	1	0	12	7	3	1	5	29	0.02%	0	0	0
Nordic Resistance Movement	NMR	2	5	3	4	2	0	1	12	29	0.02%	0	0	0
Basic Income Party	BASIP	0	12	1	1	0	0	1	7	22	0.02%	0	0	0
Initiative	INI	0	5	0	1	0	0	0	6	12	0.01%	0	0	0
Communist Party of Sweden	SKP	0	0	0	2	0	0	0	4	6	0.00%	0	0	0
Reformist Neutral Party	RNP	0	2	0	0	0	0	0	2	4	0.00%	0	0	0
European Workers Party	EAP	0	0	0	0	0	1	0	0	1	0.00%	0	0	0
Scania Party	SKÅ	0	0	0	0	0	1	0	0	1	0.00%	0	0	0
Parties not on the ballot		1	0	1	1	0	2	0	6	11	0.01%	0	0	0
Valid votes		10,067	12,331	4,962	18,071	5,973	7,881	5,735	59,550	124,570	100.00%	6	0	6
Blank votes		90	111	61	194	70	89	89	425	1,129	0.90%			
Rejected votes – unregistered parties		5	2	3	4	2	0	4	7	27	0.02%			
Rejected votes – other		4	6	4	9	1	6	3	21	54	0.04%			
Total polled		10,166	12,450	5,030	18,278	6,046	7,976	5,831	60,003	125,780	88.21%			
Registered electors		11,588	14,097	5,732	21,030	7,052	9,205	6,716	67,177	142,597				
Turnout		87.73%	88.32%	87.75%	86.91%	85.73%	86.65%	86.82%	89.32%	88.21%				

The following candidates were elected:

- Constituency seats (personal mandates) - Katarina Brännström (M), 1,406 votes; Tomas Eneroth (S), 3,860 votes; and Eskil Erlandsson (C), 1,900 votes.
- Constituency seats (party mandates) - Monica Haider (S), 733 votes; Mattias Karlsson (SD), 310 votes; and Sven-Olof Sällström (SD), 2 votes.

Permanent substitutions:

- Eskil Erlandsson (C) resigned on 12 March 2019 and was replaced by Per Schöldberg (C) on the same day.

===== 2014 =====
Results of the 2014 general election held on 14 September 2014:

Party		Votes per municipality								Total votes	%	Seats		
Party		Älm- hult	Al- vesta	Lesse- bo	Ljung- by	Marka- ryd	Tings- ryd	Uppvi- dinge	Växjö	Total votes	%	Con.	Lev.	Tot.
Swedish Social Democratic Party	S	3,360	3,758	2,081	5,920	2,048	2,484	1,905	17,623	39,179	32.44%	2	0	2
Moderate Party	M	2,251	2,481	817	3,590	1,166	1,614	1,009	13,525	26,453	21.90%	2	0	2
Sweden Democrats	SD	1,498	2,611	902	2,905	1,253	1,624	1,142	6,885	18,820	15.58%	1	0	1
Centre Party	C	1,000	1,285	343	1,812	443	1,044	754	4,307	10,988	9.10%	1	0	1
Green Party	MP	523	423	230	737	207	220	168	4,051	6,559	5.43%	0	0	0
Christian Democrats	KD	513	509	122	1,033	441	346	212	2,807	5,983	4.95%	0	0	0
Left Party	V	337	493	289	742	143	289	239	2,927	5,459	4.52%	0	0	0
Liberal People's Party	FP	314	292	103	551	101	177	155	2,416	4,109	3.40%	0	0	0
Feminist Initiative	FI	145	161	94	223	55	104	77	1,368	2,227	1.84%	0	0	0
Pirate Party	PP	36	30	10	93	20	13	14	204	420	0.35%	0	0	0
Unity	ENH	9	18	3	18	4	12	9	76	149	0.12%	0	0	0
Independent Rural Party	LPo	18	14	6	35	30	10	13	12	138	0.11%	0	0	0
Christian Values Party	KrVP	8	3	2	15	17	3	1	20	69	0.06%	0	0	0
Party of the Swedes	SVP	1	17	0	16	5	3	4	14	60	0.05%	0	0	0
Animal Party	DjuP	2	2	6	6	2	3	4	23	48	0.04%	0	0	0
Classical Liberal Party	KLP	1	5	0	3	0	0	1	12	22	0.02%	0	0	0
Direct Democrats	DD	0	0	0	3	3	1	0	15	22	0.02%	0	0	0
Reformist Neutral Party	RNP	0	2	0	0	0	0	0	7	9	0.01%	0	0	0
Progressive Party		0	0	0	0	0	0	0	7	7	0.01%	0	0	0
Health Party		0	0	0	0	0	0	0	5	5	0.00%	0	0	0
Communist Party of Sweden	SKP	0	0	0	0	0	0	0	2	2	0.00%	0	0	0
European Workers Party	EAP	0	0	0	0	0	2	0	0	2	0.00%	0	0	0
Socialist Justice Party	RS	0	1	0	0	0	0	0	1	2	0.00%	0	0	0
Swedish Senior Citizen Interest Party	SPI	0	1	0	0	0	0	0	0	1	0.00%	0	0	0
Parties not on the ballot		2	8	6	10	1	3	0	12	42	0.03%	0	0	0
Valid votes		10,018	12,114	5,014	17,712	5,939	7,952	5,707	56,319	120,775	100.00%	6	0	6
Blank votes		70	108	65	193	62	85	73	485	1,141	0.94%			
Rejected votes – other		4	21	1	10	7	0	3	16	62	0.05%			
Total polled		10,092	12,243	5,080	17,915	6,008	8,037	5,783	56,820	121,978	86.68%			
Registered electors		11,703	14,152	5,821	21,028	7,158	9,466	6,747	64,648	140,723				
Turnout		86.23%	86.51%	87.27%	85.20%	83.93%	84.90%	85.71%	87.89%	86.68%				

The following candidates were elected:

- Constituency seats (personal mandates) - Tomas Eneroth (S), 3,964 votes; Eskil Erlandsson (C), 1,920 votes; and Johan Hultberg (M), 1,624 votes.
- Constituency seats (party mandates) - Katarina Brännström (M), 1,075 votes; Monica Haider (S), 1,112 votes; and Per Ramhorn (SD), 5 votes.

===== 2010 =====
Results of the 2010 general election held on 19 September 2010:

Party		Votes per municipality								Total votes	%	Seats		
Party		Älm- hult	Al- vesta	Lesse- bo	Ljung- by	Marka- ryd	Tings- ryd	Uppvi- dinge	Växjö	Total votes	%	Con.	Lev.	Tot.
Swedish Social Democratic Party	S	3,111	3,624	2,076	5,317	1,945	2,303	1,852	15,327	35,555	30.52%	3	0	3
Moderate Party	M	2,949	3,546	1,204	4,833	1,603	2,378	1,450	16,799	34,762	29.84%	2	0	2
Centre Party	C	1,085	1,316	375	2,225	564	1,200	811	3,983	11,559	9.92%	1	0	1
Sweden Democrats	SD	719	916	379	1,058	540	569	514	2,729	7,424	6.37%	0	0	0
Christian Democrats	KD	582	635	151	1,237	589	457	302	3,158	7,111	6.10%	0	0	0
Green Party	MP	540	507	286	878	209	297	211	4,116	7,044	6.05%	0	0	0
Liberal People's Party	FP	471	549	218	878	208	312	225	3,806	6,667	5.72%	0	0	0
Left Party	V	329	527	285	737	166	274	286	2,776	5,380	4.62%	0	0	0
Pirate Party	PP	64	58	10	105	31	26	14	299	607	0.52%	0	0	0
Feminist Initiative	FI	22	22	8	44	1	10	6	197	310	0.27%	0	0	0
Unity	ENH	1	3	0	3	2	0	0	12	21	0.02%	0	0	0
National Democrats	ND	1	3	0	2	1	0	1	6	14	0.01%	0	0	0
Party of the Swedes	SVP	2	0	2	0	0	0	0	6	10	0.01%	0	0	0
Classical Liberal Party	KLP	0	2	0	1	0	1	2	3	9	0.01%	0	0	0
Rural Democrats		0	1	0	1	1	0	0	4	7	0.01%	0	0	0
Spirits Party		0	0	0	1	0	0	0	5	6	0.01%	0	0	0
Freedom Party		0	0	1	0	0	0	1	2	4	0.00%	0	0	0
Active Democracy		0	0	0	0	0	0	0	3	3	0.00%	0	0	0
Republicans		0	0	0	0	0	0	0	3	3	0.00%	0	0	0
Communist Party of Sweden	SKP	0	0	0	0	0	0	0	2	2	0.00%	0	0	0
European Workers Party	EAP	0	0	0	0	0	2	0	0	2	0.00%	0	0	0
Health Care Party	Sjvåp	0	0	0	1	0	1	0	0	2	0.00%	0	0	0
Socialist Justice Party	RS	1	0	0	0	0	0	0	0	1	0.00%	0	0	0
Swedish Senior Citizen Interest Party	SPI	1	0	0	0	0	0	0	0	1	0.00%	0	0	0
Parties not on the ballot		1	0	0	2	0	1	0	5	9	0.01%	0	0	0
Valid votes		9,879	11,709	4,995	17,323	5,860	7,831	5,675	53,241	116,513	100.00%	6	0	6
Blank votes		109	145	89	264	86	118	92	620	1,523	1.29%			
Rejected votes – other		3	4	3	10	0	2	1	30	53	0.04%			
Total polled		9,991	11,858	5,087	17,597	5,946	7,951	5,768	53,891	118,089	85.09%			
Registered electors		11,800	14,133	5,949	20,989	7,205	9,621	6,933	62,151	138,781				
Turnout		84.67%	83.90%	85.51%	83.84%	82.53%	82.64%	83.20%	86.71%	85.09%				

The following candidates were elected:

- Constituency seats (personal mandates) - Tomas Eneroth (S), 3,420 votes; and Eskil Erlandsson (C), 2,810 votes.
- Constituency seats (party mandates) - Carina Adolfsson Elgestam (S), 501 votes; Katarina Brännström (M), 2,447 votes; ClasGöran Carlsson (S), 1,226 votes; and Johan Hultberg (M), 1,066 votes.

==== 2000s ====
===== 2006 =====
Results of the 2006 general election held on 17 September 2006:

Party		Votes per municipality								Total votes	%	Seats		
Party		Älm- hult	Al- vesta	Lesse- bo	Ljung- by	Marka- ryd	Tings- ryd	Uppvi- dinge	Växjö	Total votes	%	Con.	Lev.	Tot.
Swedish Social Democratic Party	S	3,536	4,263	2,332	5,948	2,314	2,630	2,114	16,919	40,056	35.98%	3	0	3
Moderate Party	M	2,303	2,793	879	3,849	1,112	2,046	1,146	13,326	27,454	24.66%	2	0	2
Centre Party	C	1,196	1,508	463	2,327	582	1,238	892	4,356	12,562	11.28%	1	0	1
Christian Democrats	KD	741	864	198	1,519	704	592	361	3,845	8,824	7.93%	0	1	1
Liberal People's Party	FP	458	586	194	830	208	324	190	3,591	6,381	5.73%	0	0	0
Left Party	V	322	508	367	741	158	314	338	2,733	5,481	4.92%	0	0	0
Green Party	MP	331	372	171	585	135	230	149	2,722	4,695	4.22%	0	0	0
Sweden Democrats	SD	440	440	144	538	268	301	319	1,390	3,840	3.45%	0	0	0
Pirate Party	PP	49	73	30	87	65	25	16	315	660	0.59%	0	0	0
June List		14	59	26	50	31	50	40	208	478	0.43%	0	0	0
Feminist Initiative	FI	23	47	17	83	6	16	15	259	466	0.42%	0	0	0
Swedish Senior Citizen Interest Party	SPI	6	21	9	19	12	13	6	75	161	0.14%	0	0	0
Unity	ENH	1	8	4	4	3	4	2	47	73	0.07%	0	0	0
Health Care Party	Sjvåp	6	10	4	10	3	4	2	31	70	0.06%	0	0	0
People's Will		0	5	2	6	0	0	1	28	42	0.04%	0	0	0
National Socialist Front		0	1	0	2	0	4	2	7	16	0.01%	0	0	0
New Future	NYF	5	0	0	3	0	0	1	1	10	0.01%	0	0	0
European Workers Party	EAP	0	2	0	0	0	5	0	0	7	0.01%	0	0	0
Active Democracy		0	0	0	0	0	0	0	6	6	0.01%	0	0	0
National Democrats	ND	1	1	0	0	1	0	0	2	5	0.00%	0	0	0
Classical Liberal Party	KLP	0	0	0	1	0	0	0	2	3	0.00%	0	0	0
The Communists	KOMM	0	2	0	0	0	0	0	1	3	0.00%	0	0	0
Socialist Justice Party	RS	0	1	0	1	0	0	0	1	3	0.00%	0	0	0
Unique Party		0	0	0	0	1	0	0	1	2	0.00%	0	0	0
Kvinnokraft		0	0	0	0	1	0	0	0	1	0.00%	0	0	0
Nordic Union		0	0	0	1	0	0	0	0	1	0.00%	0	0	0
Partiet.se		0	0	0	0	0	0	0	1	1	0.00%	0	0	0
Other parties		0	3	1	4	1	4	1	12	26	0.02%	0	0	0
Valid votes		9,432	11,567	4,841	16,608	5,605	7,800	5,595	49,879	111,327	100.00%	6	1	7
Blank votes		183	227	115	351	119	173	129	854	2,151	1.90%			
Rejected votes – other		2	5	0	5	1	1	0	13	27	0.02%			
Total polled		9,617	11,799	4,956	16,964	5,725	7,974	5,724	50,746	113,505	82.84%			
Registered electors		11,828	14,253	6,002	20,745	7,252	9,940	7,091	59,906	137,017				
Turnout		81.31%	82.78%	82.57%	81.77%	78.94%	80.22%	80.72%	84.71%	82.84%				

The following candidates were elected:

- Constituency seats (personal mandates) - Eskil Erlandsson (C), 2,617 votes.
- Constituency seats (party mandates) - Carina Adolfsson Elgestam (S), 482 votes; Anna Bergkvist (M), 444 votes; Katarina Brännström (M), 2,005 votes; Tomas Eneroth (S), 2,997 votes; and Lars Wegendal (S), 608 votes.
- Levelling seats (personal mandates) - Eva Johnsson (KD), 759 votes.

===== 2002 =====
Results of the 2002 general election held on 15 September 2002:

Party		Votes per municipality								Total votes	%	Seats		
Party		Älm- hult	Al- vesta	Lesse- bo	Ljung- by	Marka- ryd	Tings- ryd	Uppvi- dinge	Växjö	Total votes	%	Con.	Lev.	Tot.
Swedish Social Democratic Party	S	4,162	4,568	2,674	6,388	2,473	2,870	2,491	18,070	43,696	40.56%	3	0	3
Moderate Party	M	1,381	1,478	506	1,972	659	1,170	609	7,425	15,200	14.11%	1	0	1
Centre Party	C	1,064	1,544	409	2,319	557	1,395	910	3,548	11,746	10.90%	1	0	1
Christian Democrats	KD	999	1,270	325	2,080	902	937	514	4,668	11,695	10.86%	1	0	1
Liberal People's Party	FP	816	1,002	375	1,375	369	490	388	5,723	10,538	9.78%	0	1	1
Left Party	V	441	814	471	1,050	278	472	511	3,827	7,864	7.30%	0	0	0
Green Party	MP	312	373	182	634	146	258	157	2,292	4,354	4.04%	0	0	0
Sweden Democrats	SD	120	249	60	199	166	171	140	703	1,808	1.68%	0	0	0
Swedish Senior Citizen Interest Party	SPI	7	34	15	12	4	12	9	303	396	0.37%	0	0	0
New Future	NYF	29	8	0	99	6	66	0	8	216	0.20%	0	0	0
Norrbotten Party	NBP	1	4	0	1	2	0	1	4	13	0.01%	0	0	0
Unity	ENH	1	1	0	1	1	2	1	6	13	0.01%	0	0	0
The Communists	KOMM	1	4	0	0	0	0	0	3	8	0.01%	0	0	0
Socialist Justice Party	RS	0	0	0	0	0	0	1	6	7	0.01%	0	0	0
European Workers Party	EAP	0	3	0	0	0	2	0	0	5	0.00%	0	0	0
Other parties		9	22	7	30	32	16	6	45	167	0.16%	0	0	0
Valid votes		9,343	11,374	5,024	16,160	5,595	7,861	5,738	46,631	107,726	100.00%	6	1	7
Rejected votes		140	166	90	292	101	132	80	689	1,690	1.54%			
Total polled		9,483	11,540	5,114	16,452	5,696	7,993	5,818	47,320	109,416	80.97%			
Registered electors		11,883	14,250	6,196	20,576	7,359	10,223	7,264	57,375	135,126				
Turnout		79.80%	80.98%	82.54%	79.96%	77.40%	78.19%	80.09%	82.47%	80.97%				

The following candidates were elected:

- Constituency seats (personal mandates) - Tomas Eneroth (S), 3,536 votes; Eskil Erlandsson (C), 3,262 votes; Anders G. Högmark (M), 2,474 votes; and Olle Sandahl (KD), 1,006 votes.
- Constituency seats (party mandates) - Carina Adolfsson Elgestam (S), 681 votes; and Lars Wegendal (S), 991 votes.
- Levelling seats (personal mandates) - Gunnar Nordmark (FP), 871 votes.

==== 1990s ====
===== 1998 =====
Results of the 1998 general election held on 20 September 1998:

Party		Votes per municipality								Total votes	%	Seats		
Party		Älm- hult	Al- vesta	Lesse- bo	Ljung- by	Marka- ryd	Tings- ryd	Uppvi- dinge	Växjö	Total votes	%	Con.	Lev.	Tot.
Swedish Social Democratic Party	S	3,812	4,298	2,446	5,816	2,355	2,720	2,323	15,969	39,739	36.51%	3	0	3
Moderate Party	M	2,064	2,022	732	2,955	982	1,683	853	10,568	21,859	20.08%	1	0	1
Christian Democrats	KD	1,263	1,721	508	2,940	1,123	1,215	761	6,195	15,726	14.45%	1	0	1
Left Party	V	796	1,160	822	1,580	598	794	849	5,078	11,677	10.73%	1	0	1
Centre Party	C	1,044	1,384	340	1,870	498	1,193	798	3,330	10,457	9.61%	0	1	1
Green Party	MP	337	412	197	657	208	342	214	2,147	4,514	4.15%	0	0	0
Liberal People's Party	FP	248	241	115	403	109	132	150	1,802	3,200	2.94%	0	0	0
Other parties		121	173	56	267	110	109	69	775	1,680	1.54%	0	0	0
Valid votes		9,685	11,411	5,216	16,488	5,983	8,188	6,017	45,864	108,852	100.00%	6	1	7
Rejected votes		172	192	120	391	136	139	121	752	2,023	1.82%			
Total polled		9,857	11,603	5,336	16,879	6,119	8,327	6,138	46,616	110,875	82.28%			
Registered electors		11,955	14,230	6,394	20,767	7,614	10,584	7,509	55,705	134,758				
Turnout		82.45%	81.54%	83.45%	81.28%	80.37%	78.68%	81.74%	83.68%	82.28%				

The following candidates were elected:

- Constituency seats (personal mandates) - Anders G. Högmark (M), 2,883 votes; and Lennart Värmby (V), 1,872 votes.
- Constituency seats (party mandates) - Carina Adolfsson (S), 744 votes; Harald Bergström (KD), 419 votes; Tomas Eneroth (S), 2,601 votes; and Lars Wegendal (S), 824 votes.
- Levelling seats (personal mandates) - Eskil Erlandsson (C), 2,921 votes.

===== 1994 =====
Results of the 1994 general election held on 18 September 1994:

Party		Votes per municipality								Total votes	%	Seats		
Party		Älm- hult	Al- vesta	Lesse- bo	Ljung- by	Marka- ryd	Tings- ryd	Uppvi- dinge	Växjö	Total votes	%	Con.	Lev.	Tot.
Swedish Social Democratic Party	S	4,700	5,259	3,253	7,213	3,099	3,609	3,163	19,041	49,337	42.63%	3	0	3
Moderate Party	M	2,272	2,524	846	3,484	1,217	1,926	1,043	11,594	24,906	21.52%	2	0	2
Centre Party	C	1,416	2,116	516	2,683	812	1,893	1,186	4,787	15,409	13.31%	1	0	1
Left Party	V	337	681	449	935	334	400	503	3,050	6,689	5.78%	0	0	0
Liberal People's Party	FP	482	493	224	865	275	276	245	3,386	6,246	5.40%	0	0	0
Green Party	MP	419	515	266	944	321	385	265	2,418	5,533	4.78%	0	0	0
Christian Democratic Unity	KDS	494	580	122	1,212	436	372	223	2,083	5,522	4.77%	0	0	0
New Democracy	NyD	83	176	46	147	66	120	42	345	1,025	0.89%	0	0	0
Other parties		102	121	38	131	74	69	56	477	1,068	0.92%	0	0	0
Valid votes		10,305	12,465	5,760	17,614	6,634	9,050	6,726	47,181	115,735	100.00%	6	0	6
Rejected votes		133	191	92	309	99	187	102	742	1,855	1.58%			
Total polled		10,438	12,656	5,852	17,923	6,733	9,237	6,828	47,923	117,590	87.61%			
Registered electors		11,890	14,367	6,560	20,695	7,844	10,890	7,867	54,102	134,215				
Turnout		87.79%	88.09%	89.21%	86.61%	85.84%	84.82%	86.79%	88.58%	87.61%				

The following candidates were elected: Tomas Eneroth (S); Eskil Erlandsson (C); Jan-Olof Franzén (M); Lars Hedfors (S); Anders G. Högmark (M); and Monica Widnemark (S).

===== 1991 =====
Results of the 1991 general election held on 15 September 1991:

Party		Votes per municipality								Total votes	%	Seats		
Party		Älm- hult	Al- vesta	Lesse- bo	Ljung- by	Marka- ryd	Tings- ryd	Uppvi- dinge	Växjö	Total votes	%	Con.	Lev.	Tot.
Swedish Social Democratic Party	S	3,933	4,298	2,877	5,771	2,468	2,920	2,696	14,467	39,430	34.48%	3	0	3
Moderate Party	M	1,977	2,160	788	2,941	1,134	1,773	922	10,582	22,277	19.48%	2	0	2
Centre Party	C	1,534	2,291	602	2,887	874	2,082	1,339	5,385	16,994	14.86%	1	0	1
Christian Democratic Unity	KDS	880	1,118	289	2,074	730	748	501	3,751	10,091	8.82%	0	1	1
New Democracy	NyD	713	1,036	319	1,607	616	721	506	3,076	8,594	7.51%	0	1	1
Liberal People's Party	FP	683	605	330	1,111	332	379	302	4,027	7,769	6.79%	0	1	1
Left Party	V	269	448	374	540	227	262	356	1,937	4,413	3.86%	0	0	0
Green Party	MP	198	345	144	507	160	251	150	1,800	3,555	3.11%	0	0	0
Other parties		77	163	50	92	164	51	26	613	1,236	1.08%	0	0	0
Valid votes		10,264	12,464	5,773	17,530	6,705	9,187	6,798	45,638	114,359	100.00%	6	3	9
Rejected votes		143	216	113	286	107	162	128	845	2,000	1.72%			
Total polled		10,407	12,680	5,886	17,816	6,812	9,349	6,926	46,483	116,359	87.67%			
Registered electors		11,976	14,437	6,575	20,507	7,964	10,971	8,026	52,262	132,718				
Turnout		86.90%	87.83%	89.52%	86.88%	85.53%	85.22%	86.29%	88.94%	87.67%				

The following candidates were elected: Harald Bergström (KDS); Charlotte Branting (FP); Bo Frank (M); Stina Gustavsson (C); Lars Hedfors (S); Anders G. Högmark (M); Kjell Nilsson (S); Sten Söderberg (NyD); and Monica Widnemark (S).

Permanent substitutions:

- Bo Frank (M) resigned on 31 December 1991 and was replaced by Kristina Knöös-Franzén (M) on 1 January 1992.
- Kristina Knöös-Franzén (M) resigned on 9 January 1992 and was replaced by Jan-Olof Franzén (M) on 13 January 1992.

==== 1980s ====
===== 1988 =====
Results of the 1988 general election held on 18 September 1988:

Party		Votes per municipality								Total votes	%	Seats		
Party		Älm- hult	Al- vesta	Lesse- bo	Ljung- by	Marka- ryd	Tings- ryd	Uppvi- dinge	Växjö	Total votes	%	Con.	Lev.	Tot.
Swedish Social Democratic Party	S	4,459	4,978	3,192	6,690	3,061	3,353	3,165	17,185	46,083	41.11%	3	0	3
Centre Party	C	1,879	2,798	665	3,823	1,191	2,500	1,599	6,277	20,732	18.50%	1	0	1
Moderate Party	M	1,740	2,004	649	2,566	1,011	1,605	774	8,800	19,149	17.08%	1	0	1
Liberal People's Party	FP	782	917	383	1,489	531	590	467	5,228	10,387	9.27%	1	0	1
Green Party	MP	539	579	239	1,001	351	370	266	2,533	5,878	5.24%	0	0	0
Left Party – Communists	VPK	339	473	496	675	269	331	377	2,337	5,297	4.73%	0	0	0
Christian Democratic Unity	KDS	384	515	132	897	354	345	248	1,534	4,409	3.93%	0	0	0
Other parties		11	24	1	17	10	20	4	72	159	0.14%	0	0	0
Valid votes		10,133	12,288	5,757	17,158	6,778	9,114	6,900	43,966	112,094	100.00%	6	0	6
Rejected votes		69	155	54	220	83	100	70	574	1,325	1.17%			
Total polled		10,202	12,443	5,811	17,378	6,861	9,214	6,970	44,540	113,419	86.57%			
Registered electors		11,747	14,348	6,455	20,352	8,109	10,870	8,079	51,049	131,009				
Turnout		86.85%	86.72%	90.02%	85.39%	84.61%	84.77%	86.27%	87.25%	86.57%				

The following candidates were elected: Charlotte Branting (FP); Stina Gustavsson (C); Lars Hedfors (S); Anders G. Högmark (M); Ulla Johansson (S); and Kjell Nilsson (S).

===== 1985 =====
Results of the 1985 general election held on 15 September 1985:

Party		Votes per municipality								Total votes	%	Seats		
Party		Älm- hult	Al- vesta	Lesse- bo	Ljung- by	Marka- ryd	Tings- ryd	Uppvi- dinge	Växjö	Total votes	%	Con.	Lev.	Tot.
Swedish Social Democratic Party	S	4,619	5,207	3,342	6,766	3,236	3,454	3,303	17,425	47,352	40.88%	3	0	3
Moderate Party	M	2,319	2,541	892	3,508	1,309	2,129	1,096	10,515	24,309	20.99%	1	1	2
Centre Party	C	2,197	3,208	748	4,652	1,614	2,847	1,841	6,932	24,039	20.75%	1	0	1
Liberal People's Party	FP	1,008	1,293	464	2,126	748	801	580	6,261	13,281	11.47%	1	0	1
Left Party – Communists	VPK	329	461	463	587	238	338	406	2,170	4,992	4.31%	0	0	0
Green Party	MP	152	141	80	209	125	120	73	732	1,632	1.41%	0	0	0
Other parties		11	20	8	19	10	13	9	130	220	0.19%	0	0	0
Valid votes		10,635	12,871	5,997	17,867	7,280	9,702	7,308	44,165	115,825	100.00%	6	1	7
Rejected votes		67	109	37	162	59	79	53	388	954	0.82%			
Total polled		10,702	12,980	6,034	18,029	7,339	9,781	7,361	44,553	116,779	89.98%			
Registered electors		11,871	14,434	6,521	20,216	8,299	11,011	8,196	49,239	129,787				
Turnout		90.15%	89.93%	92.53%	89.18%	88.43%	88.83%	89.81%	90.48%	89.98%				

The following candidates were elected: Charlotte Branting (FP); Rune Gustavsson (C); Lars Hedfors (S); Anders G. Högmark (M); Erik Hovhammar (M); Ulla Johansson (S); and Kjell Nilsson (S).

Permanent substitutions:

- Rune Gustavsson (C) resigned in October 1986 and was replaced by Stina Gustavsson (C) on 6 October 1986.

===== 1982 =====
Results of the 1982 general election held on 19 September 1982:

Party		Votes per municipality								Total votes	%	Seats		
Party		Älm- hult	Al- vesta	Lesse- bo	Ljung- by	Marka- ryd	Tings- ryd	Uppvi- dinge	Växjö	Total votes	%	Con.	Lev.	Tot.
Swedish Social Democratic Party	S	4,592	5,211	3,511	6,705	3,360	3,512	3,372	17,244	47,507	41.06%	3	0	3
Centre Party	C	2,483	3,586	923	5,295	1,801	3,133	2,025	8,396	27,642	23.89%	2	0	2
Moderate Party	M	2,457	2,741	939	3,755	1,419	2,325	1,265	11,794	26,695	23.07%	2	0	2
Left Party – Communists	VPK	354	477	441	570	242	365	433	2,098	4,980	4.30%	0	0	0
Liberal People's Party	FP	371	487	157	836	350	271	231	1,977	4,680	4.04%	0	0	0
Christian Democratic Unity	KDS	209	240	97	461	241	148	107	702	2,205	1.91%	0	0	0
Green Party	MP	155	173	78	251	106	146	98	877	1,884	1.63%	0	0	0
K-Party	K-P	0	13	2	5	0	0	0	18	38	0.03%	0	0	0
Other parties		4	11	4	2	3	9	4	46	83	0.07%	0	0	0
Valid votes		10,625	12,939	6,152	17,880	7,522	9,909	7,535	43,152	115,714	100.00%	7	0	7
Rejected votes		82	96	36	106	67	84	50	388	909	0.78%			
Total polled		10,707	13,035	6,188	17,986	7,589	9,993	7,585	43,540	116,623	91.38%			
Registered electors		11,648	14,242	6,575	19,857	8,318	11,209	8,277	47,495	127,621				
Turnout		91.92%	91.53%	94.11%	90.58%	91.24%	89.15%	91.64%	91.67%	91.38%				

The following candidates were elected: Rune Gustavsson (C); Stina Gustavsson (C); Lars Hedfors (S); Anders G. Högmark (M); Erik Hovhammar (M); Ulla Johansson (S); and Kjell Nilsson (S).

==== 1970s ====
===== 1979 =====
Results of the 1979 general election held on 16 September 1979:

Party		Votes per municipality								Total votes	%	Seats		
Party		Älm- hult	Al- vesta	Lesse- bo	Ljung- by	Marka- ryd	Tings- ryd	Uppvi- dinge	Växjö	Total votes	%	Con.	Lev.	Tot.
Swedish Social Democratic Party	S	4,299	4,614	3,428	5,869	3,132	3,310	3,311	15,322	43,285	38.15%	3	0	3
Centre Party	C	2,738	3,880	1,049	5,748	2,059	3,562	2,253	9,538	30,827	27.17%	2	0	2
Moderate Party	M	2,235	2,417	845	3,235	1,202	2,120	1,130	10,234	23,418	20.64%	1	1	2
Liberal People's Party	FP	713	964	321	1,544	607	580	435	4,008	9,172	8.08%	0	0	0
Left Party – Communists	VPK	313	421	439	557	241	342	455	1,989	4,757	4.19%	0	0	0
Christian Democratic Unity	KDS	144	151	61	380	208	94	58	469	1,565	1.38%	0	0	0
Communist Party of Sweden	SKP	6	47	4	13	1	3	1	133	208	0.18%	0	0	0
Workers' Party – The Communists	APK	1	13	1	23	0	2	1	15	56	0.05%	0	0	0
Other parties		11	9	3	36	23	15	15	67	179	0.16%	0	0	0
Valid votes		10,460	12,516	6,151	17,405	7,473	10,028	7,659	41,775	113,467	100.00%	6	1	7
Rejected votes		42	55	22	58	17	43	33	197	467	0.41%			
Total polled		10,502	12,571	6,173	17,463	7,490	10,071	7,692	41,972	113,934	90.97%			
Registered electors		11,415	13,857	6,535	19,399	8,294	11,239	8,400	46,105	125,244				
Turnout		92.00%	90.72%	94.46%	90.02%	90.31%	89.61%	91.57%	91.04%	90.97%				

The following candidates were elected: Rune Gustavsson (C); Lars Hedfors (S); Anders G. Högmark (M); Erik Hovhammar (M); Ulla Johansson (S); Kjell Nilsson (S); and Ingegärd Oskarsson (C).

===== 1976 =====
Results of the 1976 general election held on 19 September 1976:

Party		Votes per municipality								Total votes	%	Seats		
Party		Älm- hult	Al- vesta	Lesse- bo	Ljung- by	Marka- ryd	Tings- ryd	Uppvi- dinge	Växjö	Total votes	%	Con.	Lev.	Tot.
Swedish Social Democratic Party	S	4,227	4,502	3,343	5,736	3,084	3,171	3,290	15,285	42,638	37.60%	3	0	3
Centre Party	C	3,390	4,669	1,412	6,934	2,638	4,274	2,754	12,666	38,737	34.16%	2	1	3
Moderate Party	M	1,731	1,795	551	2,574	908	1,736	880	7,331	17,506	15.44%	1	0	1
People's Party	F	596	874	308	1,277	542	508	405	4,090	8,600	7.58%	0	0	0
Left Party – Communists	VPK	293	328	402	461	234	309	444	1,541	4,012	3.54%	0	0	0
Christian Democratic Unity	KDS	158	194	64	369	198	105	65	471	1,624	1.43%	0	0	0
Communist Party of Sweden	SKP	15	62	3	30	5	4	2	117	238	0.21%	0	0	0
Other parties		1	7	0	16	14	4	1	13	56	0.05%	0	0	0
Valid votes		10,411	12,431	6,083	17,397	7,623	10,111	7,841	41,514	113,411	100.00%	6	1	7
Rejected votes		23	27	7	30	12	26	19	102	246	0.22%			
Total polled		10,434	12,458	6,090	17,427	7,635	10,137	7,860	41,616	113,657	92.23%			
Registered electors		11,240	13,474	6,411	18,943	8,284	11,229	8,530	45,121	123,232				
Turnout		92.83%	92.46%	94.99%	92.00%	92.17%	90.28%	92.15%	92.23%	92.23%				

The following candidates were elected: Bengt Fagerlund (S); Rune Gustavsson (C); Erik Hovhammar (M); Bertil Johansson (C); Rune B. Johansson (S); Kjell Nilsson (S); and Ingegärd Oskarsson (C).

===== 1973 =====
Results of the 1973 general election held on 16 September 1973:

Party		Votes per municipality								Total votes	%	Seats		
Party		Älm- hult	Al- vesta	Lesse- bo	Ljung- by	Marka- ryd	Tings- ryd	Uppvi- dinge	Växjö	Total votes	%	Con.	Lev.	Tot.
Swedish Social Democratic Party	S	4,207	4,323	3,185	5,581	3,033	3,039	3,327	14,880	41,575	38.81%	3	0	3
Centre Party	C	3,208	4,491	1,304	6,368	2,435	4,208	2,573	12,557	37,144	34.67%	2	1	3
Moderate Party	M	1,548	1,649	510	2,366	817	1,651	796	6,542	15,879	14.82%	1	0	1
People's Party	F	420	663	210	1,167	415	400	330	2,501	6,106	5.70%	0	0	0
Left Party – Communists	VPK	313	401	412	501	264	322	549	1,538	4,300	4.01%	0	0	0
Christian Democratic Unity	KDS	163	226	57	439	247	126	81	527	1,866	1.74%	0	0	0
Communist Party of Sweden	SKP	7	16	11	24	5	5	2	108	178	0.17%	0	0	0
Communist League Marxist–Leninists (the revolutionaries)	KFML(r)	0	5	2	27	2	1	14	15	66	0.06%	0	0	0
Other parties		0	1	1	2	1	1	1	15	22	0.02%	0	0	0
Valid votes		9,866	11,775	5,692	16,475	7,219	9,753	7,673	38,683	107,136	100.00%	6	1	7
Rejected votes		14	12	5	17	3	8	3	35	97	0.09%			
Total polled		9,880	11,787	5,697	16,492	7,222	9,761	7,676	38,718	107,233	91.05%			
Registered electors		10,781	12,977	6,040	18,228	7,888	10,967	8,397	42,499	117,777				
Turnout		91.64%	90.83%	94.32%	90.48%	91.56%	89.00%	91.41%	91.10%	91.05%				

The following candidates were elected: Bengt Fagerlund (S); Rune Gustavsson (C); Erik Hovhammar (M); Bertil Johansson (C); Rune B. Johansson (S); Kjell Nilsson (S); and Ingegärd Oskarsson (C).

===== 1970 =====
Results of the 1970 general election held on 20 September 1970:

Party		Votes per municipality									Total votes	%	Seats		
Party		Älm- hult	Al- vesta	Lesse- bo	Ljung- by	Marka- ryd	Tings- ryd	Uppvi- dinge	Växjö	Postal votes	Total votes	%	Con.	Lev.	Tot.
Swedish Social Democratic Party	S	3,768	3,922	2,879	5,099	2,701	2,858	3,119	12,647	3,330	40,323	39.14%	2	1	3
Centre Party	C	2,658	3,732	921	5,297	1,725	3,353	2,256	8,645	2,328	30,915	30.01%	2	0	2
Moderate Party	M	1,173	1,300	344	1,774	551	1,430	638	4,115	2,273	13,598	13.20%	1	0	1
People's Party	F	681	1,048	298	1,775	748	749	447	4,093	1,974	11,813	11.47%	1	0	1
Left Party – Communists	VPK	277	402	407	407	283	318	521	1,159	337	4,111	3.99%	0	0	0
Christian Democratic Unity	KDS	153	264	50	386	277	109	69	536	276	2,120	2.06%	0	0	0
Communist League Marxists-Leninists	KFML	11	3	4	5	1	0	6	56	45	131	0.13%	0	0	0
Other parties		0	3	0	0	0	0	0	1	6	10	0.01%	0	0	0
Valid votes		8,721	10,674	4,903	14,743	6,286	8,817	7,056	31,252	10,569	103,021	100.00%	6	1	7
Rejected votes		8	5	4	8	3	7	9	32	37	113	0.11%			
Total polled exc. postal votes		8,729	10,679	4,907	14,751	6,289	8,824	7,065	31,284	10,606	103,134				
Postal votes		942	928	621	1,437	717	856	718	4,377	-10,606	-10				
Total polled inc. postal votes		9,671	11,607	5,528	16,188	7,006	9,680	7,783	35,661	0	103,124	88.37%			
Registered electors		10,829	13,130	6,011	18,327	7,945	11,237	8,723	40,494		116,696				
Turnout		89.31%	88.40%	91.96%	88.33%	88.18%	86.14%	89.22%	88.06%		88.37%				

The following candidates were elected: Bengt Fagerlund (S); Rune Gustavsson (C); Erik Hovhammar (M); Bertil Johansson (C); Rune B. Johansson (S); Kjell Nilsson (S); and Rune Rydén (F).
