= Pair (parliamentary convention) =

Informal parliamentary arrangement

In parliamentary practice, pairing is an informal arrangement between the government and opposition parties whereby a member of a legislative body agrees or is designated by a party whip to be absent from the chamber or to abstain from voting when a member of the other party needs to be absent from the chamber due to other commitments, illness, travel problems, etc. Thus they maintain the balance of votes if one or the other is unable to attend. A three-line whip would usually be excepted from this agreement. For MPs who are not paired a bisque, a rota system allowing absence, is used.

The member that needs to be absent from their chamber would normally consult with his or her party whip, who would arrange a pair with their counterpart in the other major party, who as a matter of courtesy would normally arrange for one of its members to act as the pair. A pairing would usually not apply for critical votes, such as no confidence votes.

An alternative method of maintaining the relative voting positions of parties in a legislative body is proxy voting, which is used in New Zealand.

== Examples ==
=== Australia ===
In Australia, following the 2010 federal election, the Gillard government formed a minority government with the support of a number of votes from minor parties and independents, and the Opposition refused to grant automatic pairing, leading to some embarrassment and reversals for the Opposition when, for example, a pair was initially not given for a member to care for her sick baby or to attend at the birth of his child.

A pair has also been granted to minor party legislators. Greens Senator Scott Ludlam, for example, was given a government pair when absent from the Senate in late 2016 because of mental health issues.

The pairing system was abused in Victoria in March 2018 when the Labor government granted pairs to two Opposition MPs in the upper house, but who then returned to the chamber, while the government pairs were absent, to vote down an important government bill.

=== Canada ===
The 1926 Canadian election was called when Arthur Meighen's three-day-old Conservative government was defeated 96–95 on a motion of confidence, when a Progressive opposition MP, Thomas Bird who was paired with an absent pro-government Progressive MP, voted against the government, stating immediately afterward that he had not noticed the fellow MP's exit from the house. In 2005, Paul Martin's Liberal government faced a confidence vote. NDP MP Ed Broadbent, who planned to vote in support of the government, abstained from voting so that a Conservative MP, who planned to vote against the government but was sick, could stay at home. The Liberals narrowly won the vote, with the Speaker breaking the tie.

=== Sweden ===
Pairing (Swedish: kvittning) in the Swedish parliament is a voluntary agreement between most of the represented political parties. The system is intended to enable members of parliament to abstain from votes for electorate events, study trips etc, without affecting the likely outcome of the vote.

==== Sweden Democrats ====
The Sweden Democrats were excluded from the pairing agreement – as they were not considered a mature party – until September 2021, after they'd been in parliament for 10 years.

In 2026, the Sweden Democrats broke a pairing agreement to block a motion concerning Swedish citizenship. The Sweden Democrats were part of the Tidö coalition, which received a majority of the seats after the 2022 election and was against the motion. But the Sweden Democratic members of parliament (MPs) Elsa Widding and Katja Nyberg had split from their party and were planning to vote with the opposition to pass the motion. Therefore, the Sweden Democrats decided to let their MPs Charlotte Quensel and Michael Rubbestad – who were on a list of paired non-voting MPs – vote against the motion, blocking it by one votes difference. Swedish Democrat party group leader Linda Lindberg defended the action:

The people have voted for the Tidö majority and as a result as voters, you should also be able to expect that our policies become reality, regardless of whether there are a couple of power-seeking independents taking our seats in the chamber. [..] Important legislation must be allowed to take precedence over the influence of independents and the system of pairing off, which is why I ensured that this particular individual vote was voted through.

After the Sweden Democrats' actions, parliament was left without any pairing agreement and discussions about a new agreement followed. Moderate party group leader Mattias Karlsson rejected the idea of any agreement that would exclude the Sweden Democrats and said it could take years to reach a new agreement.

=== United Kingdom ===
In 1976, the Conservatives broke off pairing, after accusing the Labour whips of bringing in an MP who was paired off to vote on the Aircraft and Shipbuilding Industries bill; on 27 May of that year, a division on a Tory amendment to the bill tied 303–303, leading to the Speaker making a casting vote against it; on a procedural matter relating to the bill following immediately after, Labour won the division 304–303. Incensed Tory MPs accused the government of cheating on the vote, leading to physical altercations in the Commons, Shadow Minister for Industry Michael Heseltine famously removing the House of Commons mace and swinging around in the chamber, and the Speaker declaring the session being suspended as an incident of grave disorder. The Labour whips defended their action, stating that they released junior whip Tom Pendry from the pair when it was discovered that the Minister of Agriculture, Fred Peart, was abroad on a ministerial trip but not paired.

In 1979, the government of James Callaghan fell by one vote, partially due to Labour deputy whip Walter Harrison suspending the unspoken obligation of his Conservative counterpart Bernard Weatherill to pair for the terminally ill Labour backbencher Sir Alfred Broughton.

Pairing in the British House of Commons was again suspended by a decision of the Labour and Liberal Democrat Chief Whips, Donald Dewar and Archy Kirkwood on 17 December 1996, following an incident when they claimed to find the Conservative government cheating in a vote by pairing the same three Conservative MPs with three absent Labour MPs as well as three absent Liberal Democrat MPs.

The pairing system once again came under scrutiny during the 2017–2019 parliamentary term, when the Conservatives were in power as a minority government. In June 2018, Labour MP Naz Shah attacked the government after Tory whips refused to pair Shah and the heavily pregnant MPs Jo Swinson (Liberal Democrat) and Laura Pidcock (Labour) on an important Brexit vote; Shah was required to attend the debate, despite being in a wheelchair and on a morphine drip for severe nerve pain. Several weeks later, the Conservative chairman, Brandon Lewis, broke a pair with Swinson on several votes on a trade bill—Swinson was on maternity leave and held a "long-term" pair with Lewis—at the behest of the Chief Whip, Julian Smith. After Labour MP Tulip Siddiq delayed giving birth in January 2019 in order to vote on a crucial Brexit-related division, the House of Commons approved a trial of a proxy voting system for new and expectant parents.

=== United States ===
In the United States Senate and House of Representatives, pairing is referred to as a live pair, which is an informal voluntary agreement between members, not specifically authorized or recognized by House or Senate rules. Live pairs are agreements which members make to nullify the effect of absences on the outcome of recorded votes. Members expecting to be absent for a vote may "pair off" with another member who will be present and who would vote on the other side of the question, but who agrees not to vote. The member in attendance affirms a live pair, announces how each of the paired members would have voted, and then votes "present." In this way, the other member can be absent without affecting the outcome of the vote. Because pairs are informal and unofficial arrangements, they are not counted in vote totals; however, paired members' positions do appear in the Congressional Record.

An example of a live pair is the lack of vote by Steve Daines (R-MT) and Present vote of Lisa Murkowski (R-AK) during the final confirmation vote in the Senate of Brett Kavanaugh to be an Associate Justice of the Supreme Court of the United States. Daines was in attendance at his daughter's wedding in Montana at the time of the vote. Unlike in other countries, live pairing in the United States has historically mostly involved members of the same party, and was more common when ideological differences within parties were greater—for instance Northern Democrats pairing with their more segregationist Southern Democrat colleagues. However, one cross-party example occurred in April 2018, when Chris Coons (D-DE) agreed to change his vote in the Senate Foreign Relations Committee opposing the nomination of Mike Pompeo for Secretary of State to "Present" so Republican colleague Johnny Isakson, who was suffering from Parkinson's disease, did not have to make a difficult overnight journey from a funeral in Georgia in his condition.
