= Robert Olesen (politician) =

Swedish politician (born 1975)

Member of the Riksdag
- Incumbent
- Assumed office 15 April 2025
- Constituency: Kronoberg County
- In office 26 September 2022 – 18 October 2022

Personal details
- Born: Lars Robert Emil Olesen; 21 April 1975 (age 51) Malmöhus County, Sweden
- Party: Swedish Social Democratic Party

Lars Robert Emil Olesen (born 21 April 1975) is a Swedish politician from the Swedish Social Democratic Party who has been a member of the Riksdag since 15 April 2025, elected for the Kronoberg County constituency. He has previously been a municipal councillor in Alvesta Municipality and a regional councillor in Region Kronoberg.

== Biography ==
Olesen was raised in Landskrona and Alvesta. He has worked as a metalworker at Autoliv Hammarverken in Växjö, Fresh Ventilation in Gemla and AB Maskinarbeten in Alvesta. He is a member of the trade union IF Metall.

== Political career ==
From 2007 to 2012, Olesen was a municipal councillor in Alvesta Municipality; chairman of the municipal board from 2007 to 2010 and then opposition councillor from 2011 to 2012.

Olesen was elected to the Kronoberg Regional Council in the 2014 election. He was a regional councilor and 1st vice-chairman of the regional board in 2015–2018, as well as chairman of the regional board's personnel committee. During the 2019–2022 term of office, when the Social Democrats were in opposition, he was, among other things, 2nd vice-chairman of the health and medical care committee. He was then 2nd vice-chairman of the regional development committee in 2023–2024, and 2024–2025, after the Social Democrats had once again become part of the regional board, 1st vice-chairman of the same committee.

Olesen ran for the 2022 Swedish general election and became a substitute. He was the acting substitute minister for Tomas Eneroth from 26 September 2022 to 18 October 2022. When Eneroth left the Riksdag in the spring of 2025, Olesen became the new full member. In the Riksdag, he is a deputy member of the Committee on Health and Welfare and the Committee on Education.

Since 2020 he has been the party district chairman for the Social Democratic Party in Kronoberg County. In 2021 he was elected to the national party board.

== Personal life ==
Olesen lives in Alvesta, is married and has two daughters.

== See also ==
- List of members of the Riksdag, 2022–2026
