= Moheda =

- Location within Kronoberg Location within Sweden
- Coordinates: 57°00′N 14°34′E
- Country: Sweden
- Province: Småland
- County: Kronoberg County
- Municipality: Alvesta Municipality

Area
  - Total: 2.26 km^{2} (0.87 sq mi)

Population (31 December 2010)
  - Total: 1,824
  - Density: 808/km^{2} (2,090/sq mi)
- Time zone: UTC+1 (CET)
  - Summer (DST): UTC+2 (CEST)

Moheda is a locality situated in Alvesta Municipality, Kronoberg County, Sweden with 1,824 inhabitants in 2010.

== Notable natives ==
- Sven Nykvist
- Torsten Ullman
- Torsten Hägerstrand
- Mats Wilander (from Torpsbruk in Moheda Parish)
- Niklas Jihde
