= Clas-Göran Carlsson =

Swedish politician (born 1962)

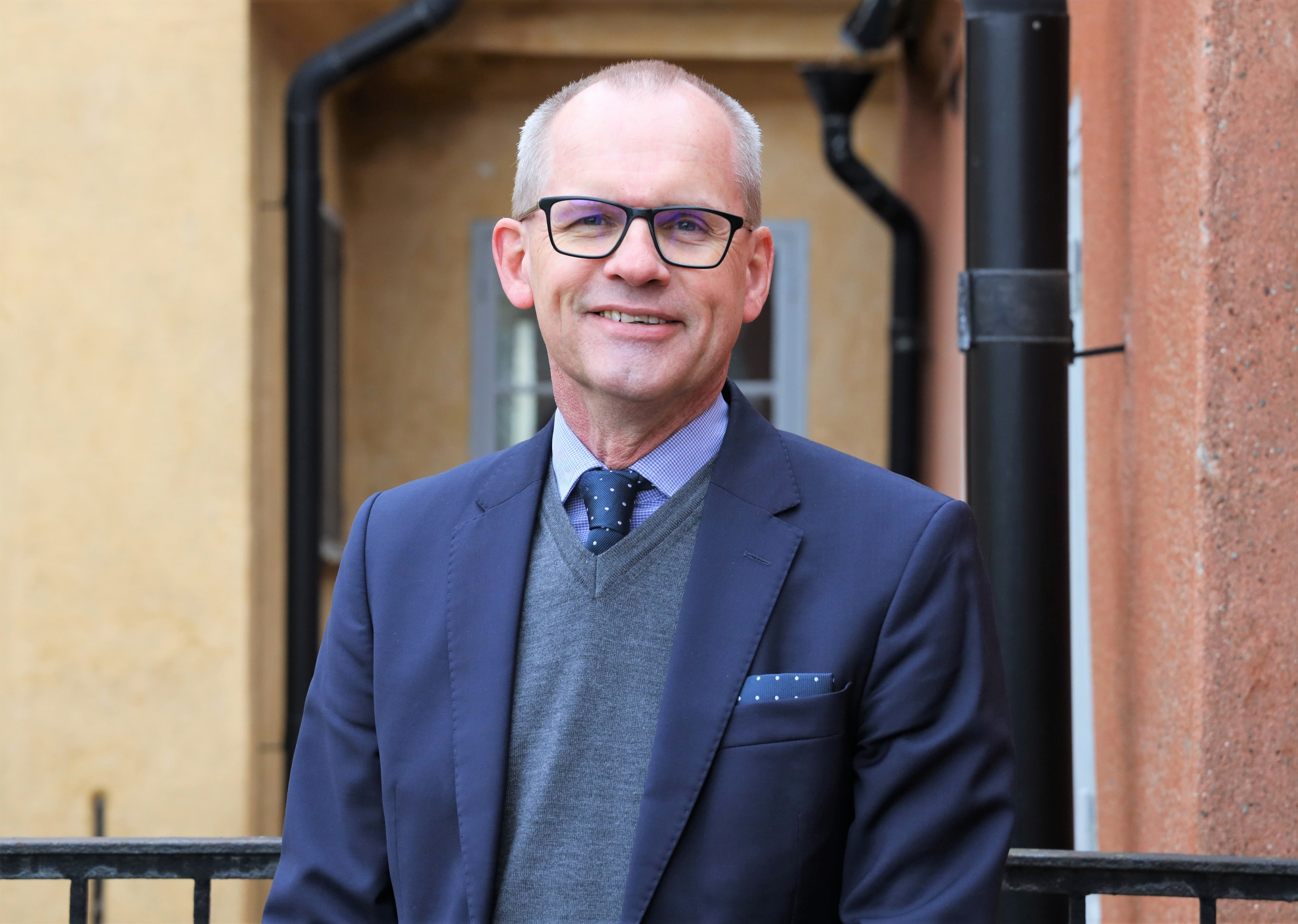
- Carlsson in 2022

Member of the Riksdag
- In office 4 October 2010 – 29 September 2014
- Constituency: Kronoberg County

Personal details
- Born: Thomas Clas-Göran Carlsson; 1962 (age 63–64)
- Party: Social Democratic Party

Thomas Clas-Göran Carlsson (born 1962) is a Swedish politician and former member of the Riksdag, the national legislature. A member of the Social Democratic Party, he represented Kronoberg County between October 2010 and September 2014. He was also a substitute member of the Riksdag for Tomas Eneroth between July 2017 and September 2022.

Carlsson is the son of welder Göran Carlsson and clerk Elsie-Britt Carlsson (née Linder). He was educated in Ljungby. He studied business administration at Halmstad University and economics at Växjö University. He was a substitute teacher (1982-1983), a bank clerk (1983-1987), bank manager (1987-1992) and managing director of Bertil Nilsson Måleri AB (1992-2002). He was a member of the municipal council in Ljungby Municipality from 2002 to 2010.
