= Grimslöv =

- Location within Kronoberg Location within Sweden
- Coordinates: 56°44′N 14°32′E
- Country: Sweden
- Province: Småland
- County: Kronoberg County
- Municipality: Alvesta Municipality

Area
  - Total: 0.71 km^{2} (0.27 sq mi)

Population (31 December 2010)
  - Total: 593
  - Density: 833/km^{2} (2,160/sq mi)
- Time zone: UTC+1 (CET)
  - Summer (DST): UTC+2 (CEST)

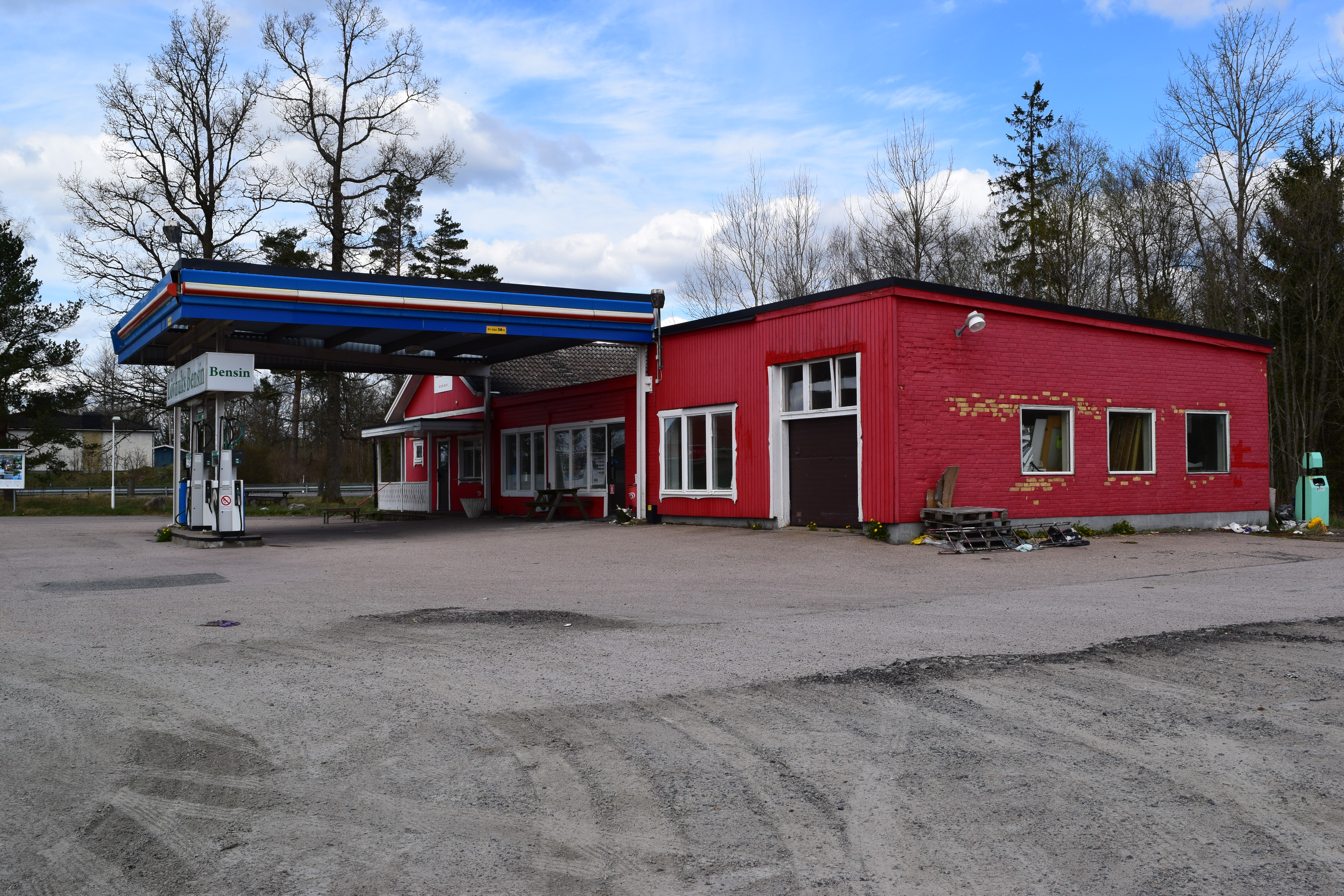
Gas station in Grimslöv

Grimslöv is a locality situated in Alvesta Municipality, Kronoberg County, Sweden with 593 inhabitants in 2010.

Grimslöv got media attention in 2015, when an article by journalist Alexander Mahmoud was nominated for Stora Journalistpriset. The article, "Hem till Byn" (Home to the Village) deals with issues about racism, bullying and identity in the village where Mahmoud grew up.
