= Monica Haider =

Swedish politician (born 1963)

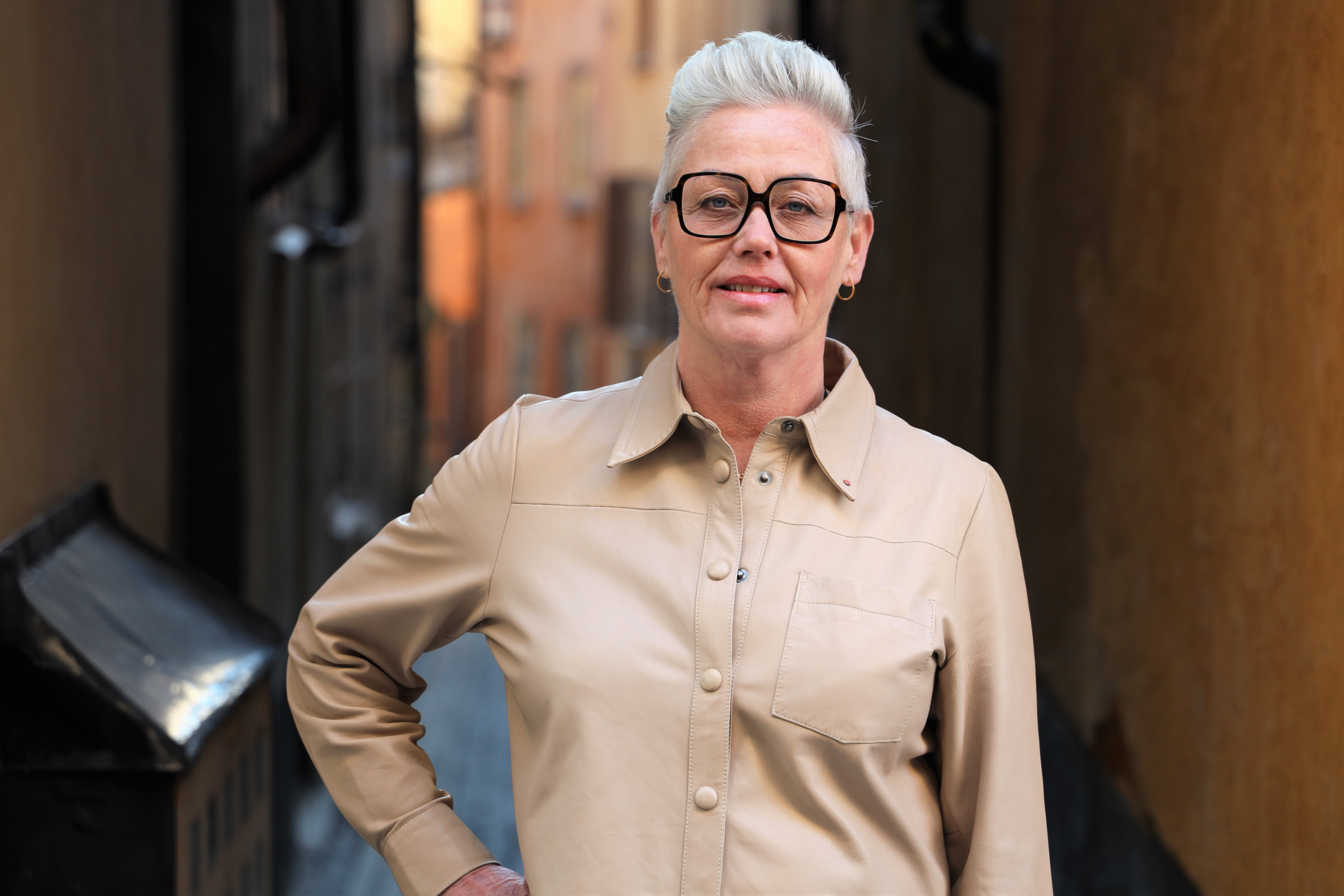
- Haider in 2022

Member of the Riksdag
- Incumbent
- Assumed office 29 September 2014
- Constituency: Kronoberg County

Personal details
- Born: 1963 (age 62–63)
- Party: Social Democrats

Monica Haider (born 1963) is a Swedish politician. Since September 2014, she serves as Member of the Riksdag. She is affiliated with the Social Democrats. She represents the constituency of Kronoberg County.

She was re-elected as Member of the Riksdag in September 2018 and September 2022.
