= Oliver Rosengren =

Swedish politician (born 1992)

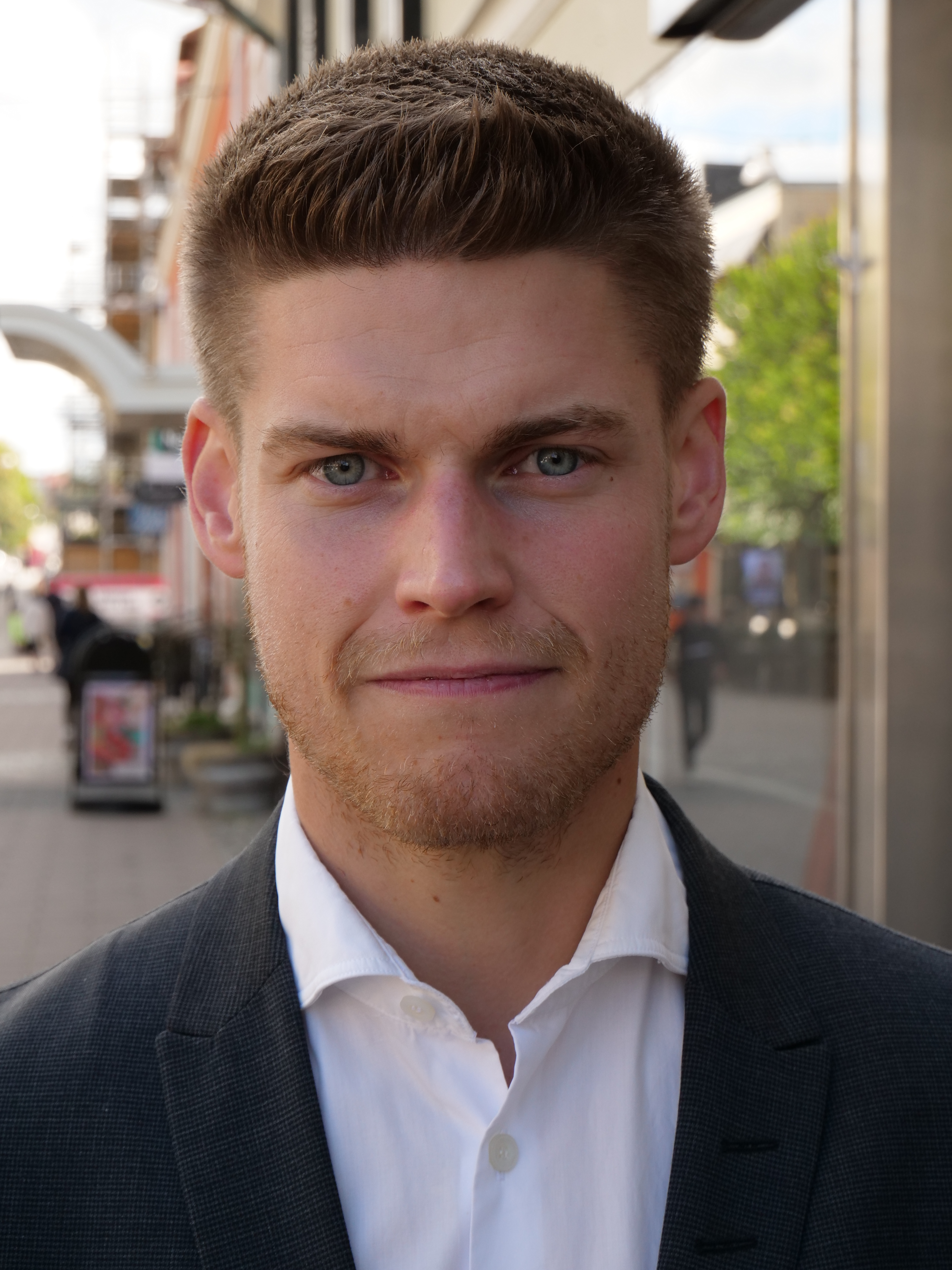

Member of the Riksdag
- Incumbent
- Assumed office 26 September 2022
- Constituency: Kronoberg County

Personal details
- Born: 4 June 1992 (age 34) Växjö, Sweden
- Party: Moderate Party
- Education: Linnaeus University

Oliver Carl Fredrik Rosengren (born 4 June 1992) is a Swedish politician for the Moderate Party. He has served as Member of the Riksdag (MP) since the 2022 election. Before his election to the Parliament, Rosengren served as councillor in Växjö Municipality from 2017 to 2022.

Besides being councillor from 2017, he was also chairman of the municipality's work and welfare committee from 2015 to 2021. As such, Rosengren become nationally known as a staunch supporter of the "Arbetslinjen", including cutting income tax, reducing social security payments and implementing measures to combat social exclusion. He was named "Sweden's most powerful politician under the age of 30" in 2021.

In his youth, he was district president of the Moderate Party Youth league in Kronoberg, and a member of the national board of the Youth league from 2014 to 2016.

He is the son of professional tennis coach Fredrik Rosengren.
