= Eskil Erlandsson =

Swedish politician (born 1957)

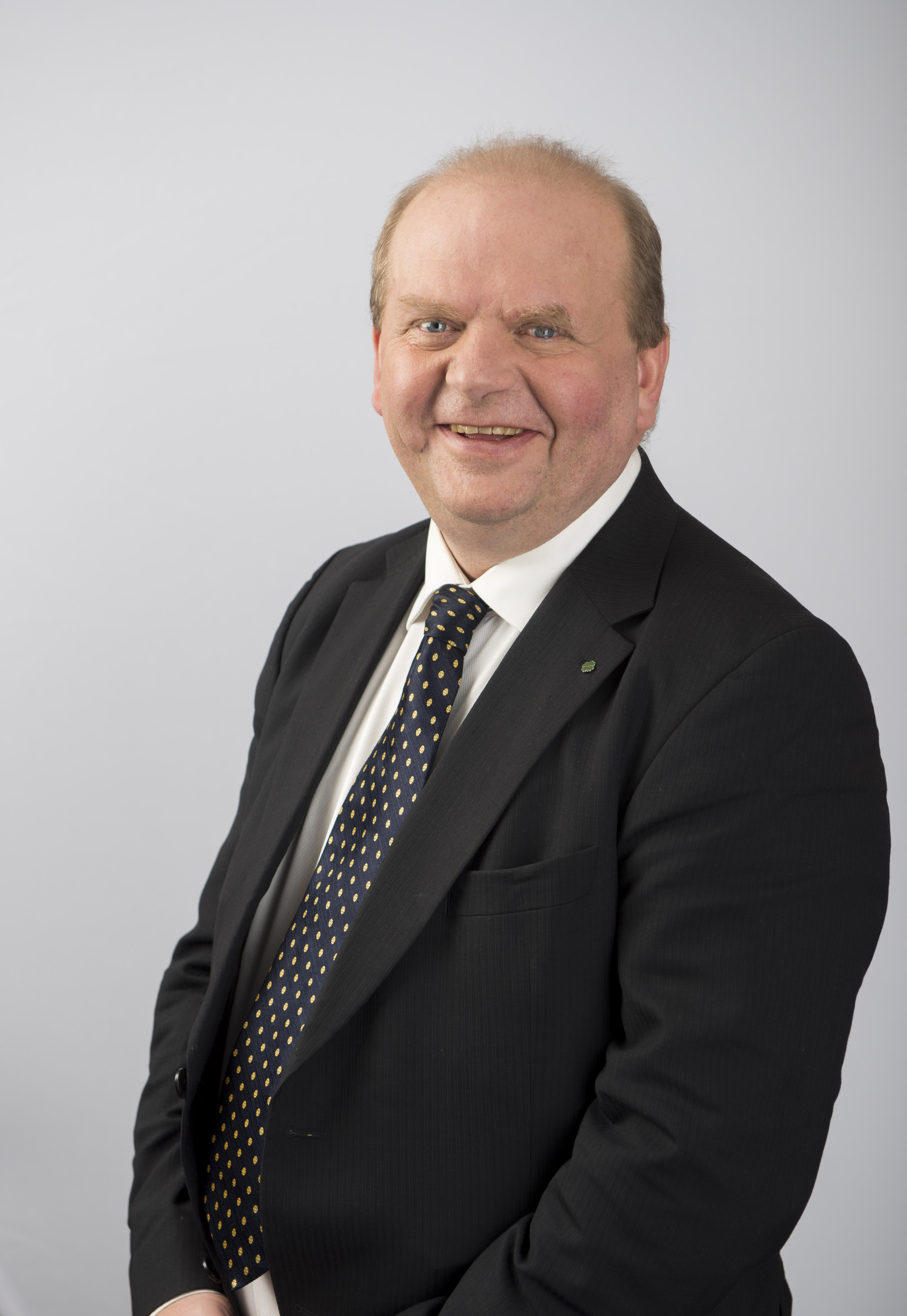

Minister for Rural Affairs
- In office 5 October 2010 – 3 October 2014
- Prime Minister: Fredrik Reinfeldt
- Preceded by: Position established
- Succeeded by: Sven-Erik Bucht

Minister for Agriculture
- In office 6 October 2006 – 5 October 2010
- Prime Minister: Fredrik Reinfeldt
- Preceded by: Ann-Christin Nyqvist
- Succeeded by: Position abolished

Member of the Swedish Riksdag for Kronoberg County
- In office 3 October 1994 – 12 March 2019

Personal details
- Born: 25 January 1957 (age 69) Annerstad, Kronoberg County
- Party: Centre Party
- Spouse: Susanne Adlercreutz
- Children: 2
- Occupation: Agricultural technologist

Lars Eskil Anders Erlandsson (born 25 January 1957) is a Swedish politician who served as Minister for Rural Affairs from 2010 to 2014, having previously served as Minister for Agriculture from 2006 to 2010. A member of the Centre Party, he was MP of the Swedish Riksdag from 1994 to 2019.

== Biography ==
Erlandsson is the son of Sven Arne and Inga Gullie Erlandsson. He comes from Torpa in Ljungby and lives on the farm Stackarp in Torpa where his brother is running the farm. By profession he is an agricultural technologist with a graduate of SLU Alnarp. He also studied at the Växjö University from 1989 to 1992.

== Political career ==
From 1983 to 1994, Erlandsson was a municipality councilor in Ljungby. He's since 1994 a member of the Swedish Parliament for Kronoberg County, but on leave since 2006 after becoming cabinet minister. He was a member of the Environment and Agriculture Committee from 1998 to 2002 and Chairman of the Defence Committee from 2002 to 2006.

He has also served as deputy of the Housing Committee, the Environment and Agriculture Committee, the Taxation Committee, the Enterprise Committee and the Committee on EU Affairs. From 2002 to 2006, Eskilsson was also alternately chairman and vice chairman of the Joint Foreign and Defence Committee.

In March 2019 Erlandsson was forced to resign from the parliament over groping allegations from four female MPs.

== Personal life ==
He has been married to Susanne Adlercreutz since April 2012 with whom he has a son, born in July 2012 and a daughter born in December 2013.

Political offices
Preceded by Ann-Christin Nyqvist	Minister for Agriculture; 2006–2010	Succeeded by Himself (as Minister for Rural Affairs)
Preceded by Himself (as Minister for Agriculture)	Minister for Rural Affairs; 2010–2014	Succeeded by Sven-Erik Bucht
