= Lars Wegendal =

Swedish politician (born 1949)

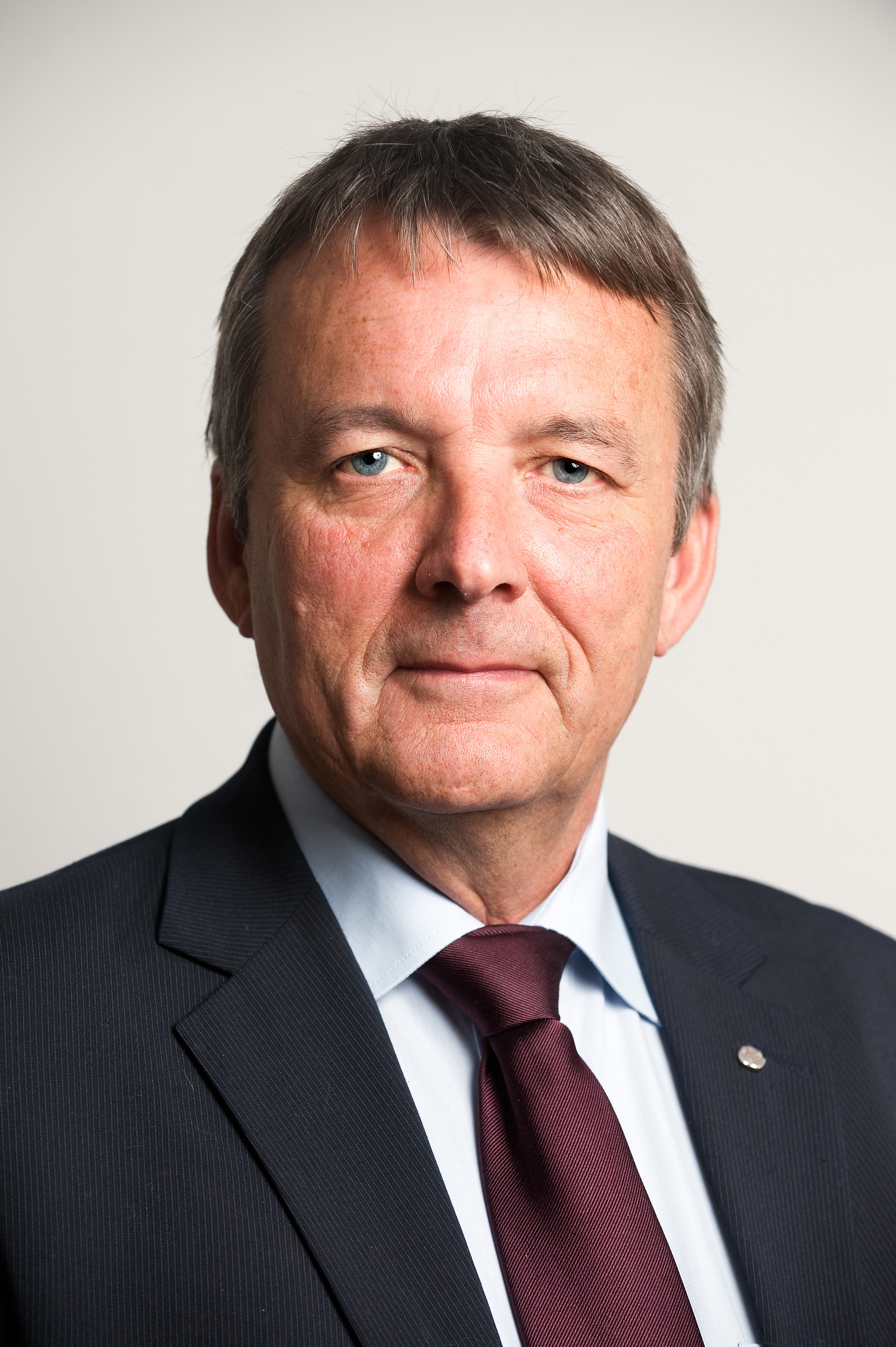
- Wegendal in January 2009

Member of the Riksdag
- In office 5 October 1998 – 4 October 2010
- Constituency: Kronoberg County

Personal details
- Born: 1949 (age 76–77)
- Party: Social Democratic Party

Lars Åke Otto Wegendal (born 1949) is a Swedish politician and former member of the Riksdag, the national legislature. A member of the Social Democratic Party, he represented Kronoberg County between October 1998 and October 2010.
