= Fredrik Rosengren =

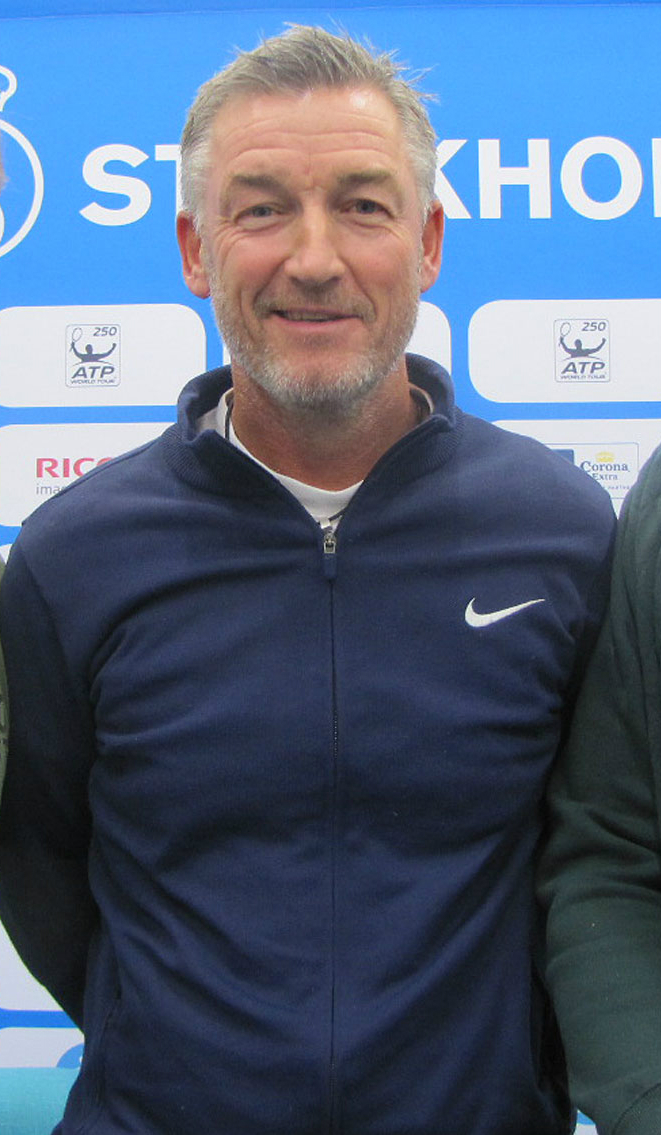
- Country (sports): Sweden
- Residence: Växjö, Sweden
- Born: 31 January 1960 (age 65); Växjö, Sweden

Coaching career (1988–present)
- Jan Gunnarsson (1988–1992); Jonas Björkman (1990–1998); Jan Apell (1994–1995); Magnus Norman (1999–2003); Jarkko Nieminen (2004–2005); Joachim Johansson (2005); Mario Ančić (2005–2008); Robin Söderling (2011); Elias Ymer (2015–2016); Jürgen Melzer (2017); Kyle Edmund (2017–2018); Karen Khachanov (2019– )

Coaching achievements
- Coachee singles titles total: 20
- Coachee(s) doubles titles total: 23
- List of notable tournaments (with champion) ATP Tour World Championships – Doubles (Björkman & Apell – 1994); Australian Open Doubles (Björkman – 1998)

Sven Hans Fredrik "Fidde" Rosengren (born 31 January 1960) is a Swedish professional tennis coach.

== Biography ==
Rosengren began his coaching career in 1988 as the coach of Jan Gunnarsson and in 1989 Gunnarsson reached the semifinals of the Australian Open. His coaching time with Gunnarsson lasted until 1992, but in 1990 he also started working with Jonas Björkman. During the time he coached Björkman, Björkman reached the 4th position on the ATP ranking in singles as well as 3rd on the doubles rankings. Björkman won 15 doubles titles during the period, six of which were with Jan Apell, for whom Rosengren also started coaching in 1994.

In 1999, Rosengren started coaching Magnus Norman and helped him reach the final of the French Open in 2000 and also to reach the top ten on the ATP ranking, with a career high of no. 2 in June 2000. In the period with Norman, that stretched from 1999 to 2003, Norman won ten singles titles.

After Norman, Rosengren coached Joachim Johansson and Mario Ančić, among others, who both made it to the top ten in the ATP ranking, during their time with him. Johansson reached the 9th ranking position during February 2005 and Ančić reached no. 7 in July 2006.

Between 2013 and 2017, Rosengren was Sweden's Davis Cup captain and also work with some of the young Swedish players. In 2017 he worked with Jürgen Melzer and at the end of 2017 he was appointed as the coach of the British player, Kyle Edmund, who reached the semifinal of the Australian Open in early 2018. At the end of the 2019 season, Rosengren started working with Russian player Karen Khachanov.

He is the father of politician Oliver Rosengren.
