= Joe Labero =

Swedish magician (born 1963)

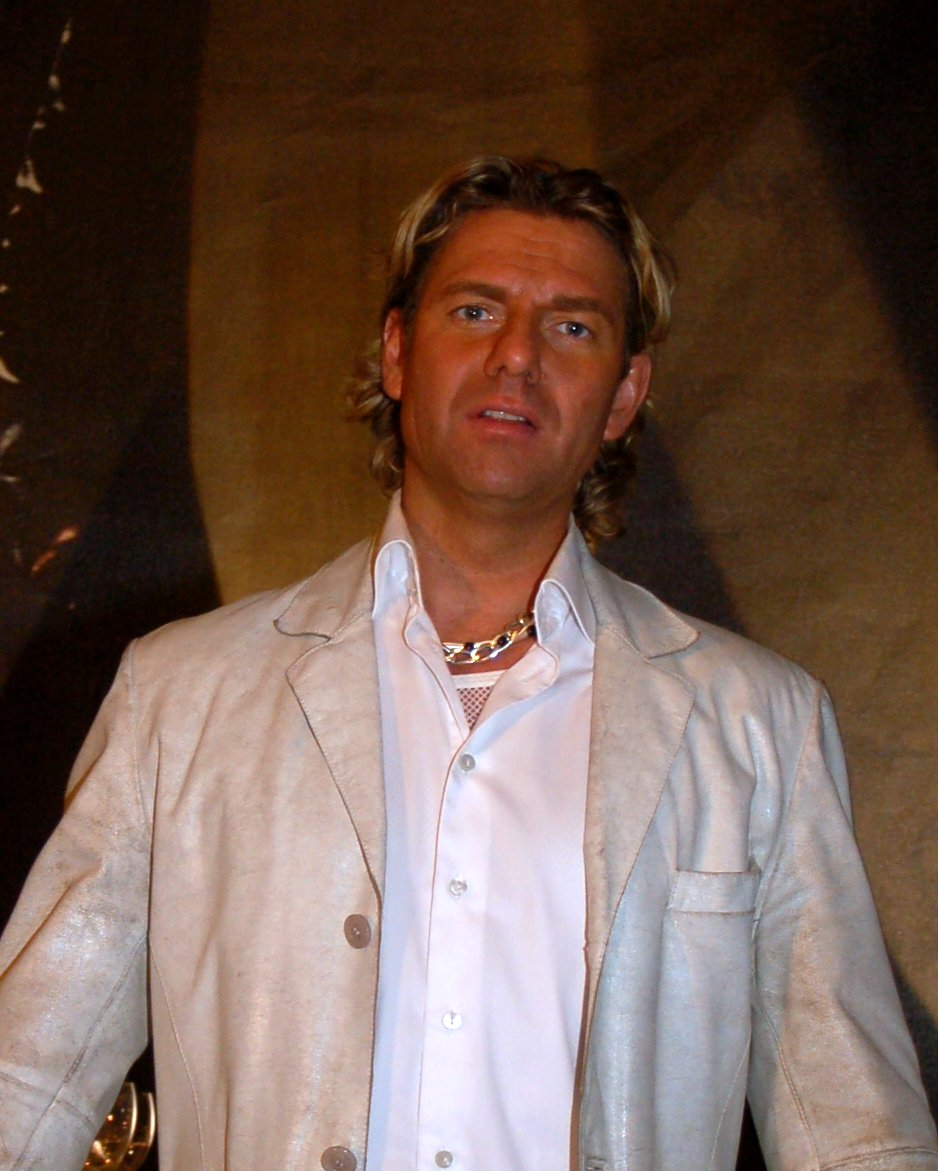
- Joe Labero
- Born: Lars Bengt Roland Johansson; 28 July 1963 (age 62); Alvesta, Sweden
- Occupations: Magician, illusionist
- Website: http://labero.com

Joe Labero (born 28 July 1963 in Alvesta, Sweden) is a Swedish magician. Joe Labero is a stage name derived from his birthname – Johansson, Lars Bengt Roland.

== Illusionist career ==
Bengt Johansson got his first magic kit when he was 12 years old. At first, he called himself "Magino", and in 1979, he won the Swedish junior championships of magic that was held in Karlstad. He met his mentor, the Swedish magician Carlo Tornedo. Carlo told him to use the first 2 letters in his name to create "Joe Labero", and his name is now officially registered as "Lars Bengt Joe Labero".

In 1991, he put up his first big production A Magic Night at Berns in Stockholm. The show was a great success and was sold out and performed 657 times. The show was shown all over Sweden and abroad for the following years. He toured until 1995.

In 1996, he premiered in Danze Fantasy Productions new show Mystique at Conrad Jupiters Casino in Australia, which ran for 16 months. The next year, he presented another show there and called it Illusions. In 1998, he took Illusions to Sweden. Together with the original performers, he made a huge success and performed this show until 1999, when he remade it and called it Joe Labero show and performed it until 2002 all over Sweden.

After this, he created the Castle Tour in Sweden, which was more intimate with the audience, and he continued to use a similar theme later at the Ship of Illusions tour when traveling by boat around Scandinavia.

Together with the Swedish piano artist Robert Wells, he created Rhapsody in Rock with Magic. This was a big show that combined live orchestral music with magic. They started in 2002, and they met again and used the same concept in the Christmas Spectacular Show.

In 2003, Labero had over 30 Ship of Illusions shows along the Scandinavian coast. Bill Clinton attended one of the shows.

In September 2007, his show Invited to Labero with an Asian theme started at Rondo in Gothenburg, Sweden. In 2010, the show was shown over 300 times and sold over 300.000 tickets.

In 2010, Labero hosted magic shows in Hamburger Börs in Stockholm, from 10 September to 30 October.

In November 2010, Labero hosted a six-month-long magic show at Jupiters Casino in Australia. The show was produced by Danze Fantasy Productions.

In 2018, Labero landed his newest show INFERNO: The Fire Spectacular in Las Vegas at the Paris Hotel and Casino.

== Awards ==
In July 2009, Labero received the award "Illusionist of the decade" in connection with the magic World Cup in Beijing, which was held from 26–31 July, 2009. Previously, this award has been received by David Copperfield and Siegfried & Roy. It intends world touring illusions during the years 2000–2009. The prize is awarded by The Merlin Award Society, which is the Oscar organization of the magic world and is based in Las Vegas.

== Private life ==
Joe Labero is engaged to international photographer Anna Vinterfall. Together, they have a daughter named Nicole Vinterfall Labero, who was born on 12 January 2008.

== Filmography ==
- Illusioner (1994)
