= Thomas Ragnarsson =

Swedish politician (born 1970)

Member of the Riksdag
- Incumbent
- Assumed office 2022
- Constituency: Kronoberg County

Personal details
- Born: 5 January 1970 (age 56) Jönköping County, Sweden
- Party: Moderate Party

Stig Thomas Ragnarsson (born 5 January 1970) is a Swedish politician from the Moderate Party who was elected a member of parliament for Kronoberg County in 2022. He previously served as a regional councillor and worked in ambulance healthcare in Kronoberg County.

== See also ==
- List of members of the Riksdag, 2022–2026
