= Katarina Brännström =

Swedish politician (born 1950)

Member of the Riksdag
- In office 2 October 2006 – 26 September 2022
- Constituency: Kronoberg County

Personal details
- Born: 1950 (age 75–76)
- Party: Moderate Party

Katarina Brännström (born 1950 in Sävsjö, Sweden) is a Swedish politician of the Moderate Party. She was a member of the Riksdag from 2006 to 2022 for the Kronoberg County constituency.
