= Katja Nyberg (politician) =

Swedish politician (born 1971)

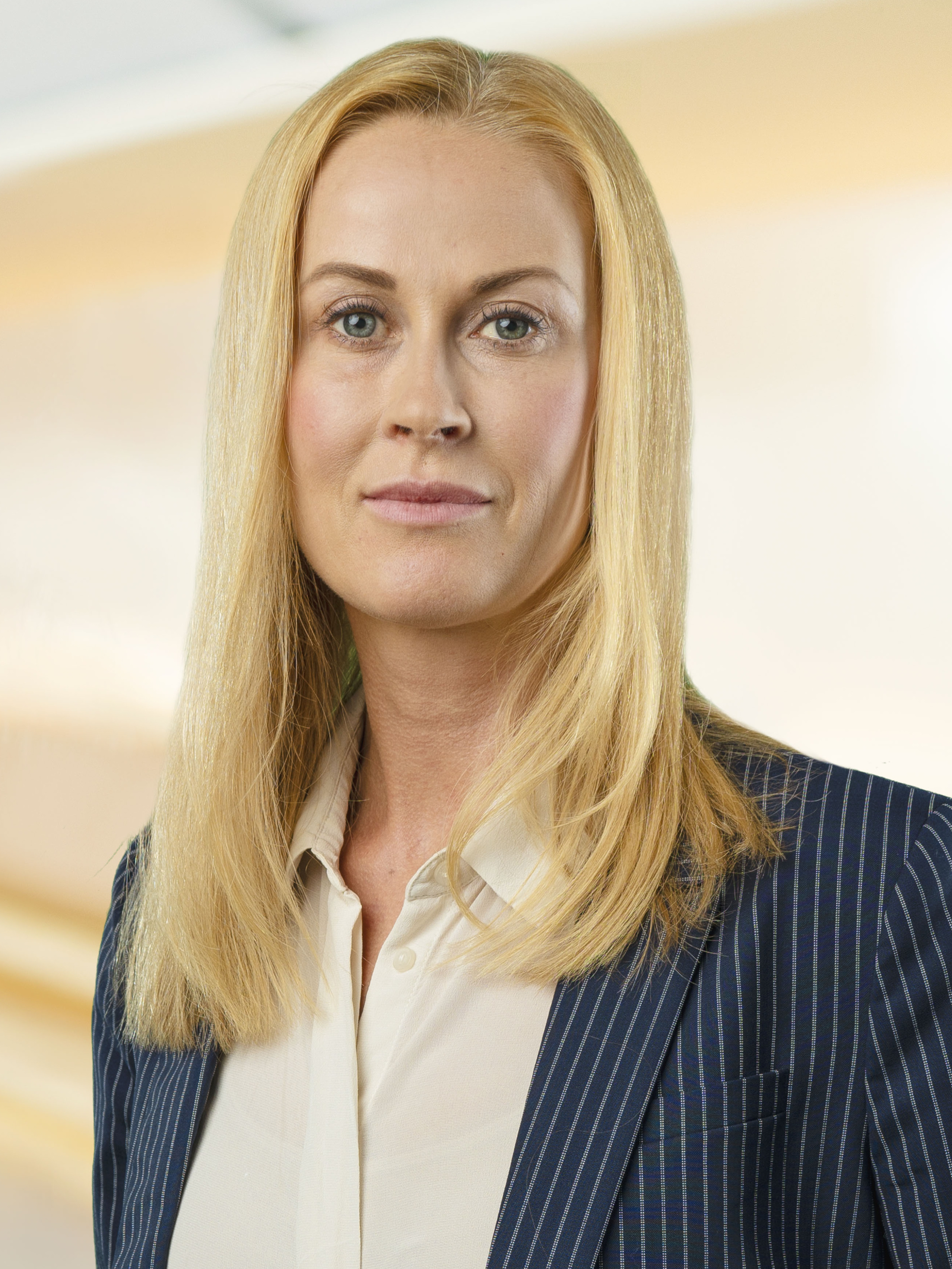
- Parliamentary portrait

Member of the Riksdag
- In office 2018–2022
- Constituency: Stockholm County

Member of the Riksdag
- In office 2022–2026
- Constituency: Kronoberg County

Personal details
- Born: 16 September 1971 (age 55)
- Party: Ambition Sweden (since 2026)
- Other political affiliations: Sweden Democrats (until 2026)

Katja Maria Elisabeth Nyberg (born 16 September 1971) is a former Swedish police officer and member of the Riksdag. First elected in 2018 for the Sweden Democrats, she left the party in 2026 but continued to serve in parliament as an independent.

Nyberg worked as a police officer and for the National Operations Department before serving as an MP. In addition, she has also been a member of the party board for the Sweden Democrats in Stockholm and serves on the Justice Committee in the Riksdag. In this role, she focuses on tackling gang crime and honor violence. Nyberg has described herself as being on the more moderate wing of the SD and that she wouldn't have joined the earlier versions of the party.

In December 2025, Nyberg was stopped by the police in Värmdö outside Stockholm, suspected of aggravated drunk driving and drug offences. Subsequently, Nyberg announced that she would leave the Sweden Democrats, but continue as a member of the Riksdag, despite being urged to resign her seat. In March 2026 she was caught driving with a suspended licence by newspaper Expressen. In April 2026, Nyberg joined Ambition Sweden, but dropped from its 2026 general election list two months after. In May of 2026 she was dismissed from her role as a police officer as a result of the charges she faces.
