= Torpsbruk =

- Location within Kronoberg Location within Sweden
- Coordinates: 57°02′N 14°35′E
- Country: Sweden
- Province: Småland
- County: Kronoberg County
- Municipality: Alvesta Municipality

Area
  - Total: 0.65 km^{2} (0.25 sq mi)

Population (31 December 2010)
  - Total: 334
  - Density: 511/km^{2} (1,320/sq mi)
- Time zone: UTC+1 (CET)
  - Summer (DST): UTC+2 (CEST)

Torpsbruk is a locality situated in Alvesta Municipality, Kronoberg County, Sweden with 334 inhabitants in 2010. Torpsbruk is on the Southern Main Line, 197 kilometres from Malmö and 402 kilometres from Stockholm. There is not currently a station, although there was one in the past.
