= Anders G. Högmark =

Swedish politician (born 1945)

Anders G. Högmark (born 29 October 1945) is a Swedish politician of the Moderate Party, member of the Riksdag 1979–2006.
