= Ambition Sweden =

Ambition Sweden Ambition Sverige
- Abbreviation: AS
- Leader: Elsa Widding
- Founder: Elsa Widding
- Founded: 12 June 2025
- Registered: 10 March 2026
- Split from: Sweden Democrats
- Headquarters: 414 52 Göteborg
- Ideology: Climate change denial Anti-immigration; Hard Euroscepticism
- Political position: Far-right
- Colours: Yellow; Dark blue Blue
- Slogan: «Sweden needs political renewal» (Swedish: «Sverige behöver politisk förnyelse»)
- Riksdag: 2 / 349
- European Parliament: 0 / 21

Website
- ambitionsverige.se

Ambition Sweden (Swedish: Ambition Sverige; AS) is a Swedish political party founded in 2025 by Elsa Widding, an independent member of the Riksdag who left the Sweden Democrats earlier. In April 2026, another ex-SD independent MP, Katja Nyberg, joined the party.

== History ==
=== Background ===
Elsa Widding was elected to the Riksdag as a member of the Sweden Democrats (SD) in the 2022 Swedish general election, but left the SD in May 2023 following a controversy over her participation in a conference in Norway that was accused of spreading conspiracy theories, including about the climate, vaccines and the Holocaust. Widding believed that the SD did not clearly enough defend her against criticism from, among others, the then Minister for Education, Mats Persson. Since then, Widding served as independent MP, despite SD's urges to resign her seat.

For 11 days in January 2024, Widding was a member of Human Rights and Democracy party (MoD), saying she made a mistake joining the party when revelations were made that the party is vaccine-skeptical.

=== Formation ===
In May 2025, Widding announced the formation of a new party, with a founding conference scheduled for 12 June 2025 and with the ambition to participate in the 2026 Swedish general election. The party was originally called Sweden First (Sverige först), but in September 2025 the name was changed to Ambition Sweden due to a name conflict and because "it has been too easy to confuse the party with other things that have nothing to do with the party."

The Ambition Sweden party name was registered by the Swedish Election Authority on 10 March 2026, allowing the party to participate in the 2026 general election.

In April 2026, Katja Nyberg, another independent MP who left SD in January due to accusations of drug-impaired driving and driving without a license, announced that she was joining Ambition Sweden and would be on the AS parliamentary list. Elsa Widding said regarding the criminal suspicions against Nybert that "there has been a terrible push against her." Among other former SD members of the Riksdag on the AS lists were Unni Björnerfors, known for anti-vaccination statements, and Olle Larsson, who left the party because the SD had not prioritized rural issues.

On 10 July 2026, it was announced that Katja Nyberg dropped from the Ambition Sweden list for the 2026 general election. Nyberg explained her decision with personal reasons.

After the 2026 general election where the party gathered 7 700 votes or 0.11% of the vote, Widding announced she would step down as leader and recommended that the party should merge with Alternativ för Sverige.

== Ideology ==
Ambition Sweden advocates for reduced immigration and Sweden's exit from the European Union and NATO.

Since leaving SD in 2023, Elsa Widding has established herself as a climate change sceptic.
