= Bertil Johansson (politician) =

Swedish politician (1930–2018)

Member of Parliament
- In office 1971–1979

Personal details
- Political party: Centre Party

Bertil Johansson (politician) (2 August 1930 – 3 January 2018) was a Swedish politician. He was a member of the Centre Party and a member of the Parliament of Sweden.
