= Rune Gustavsson =

Swedish politician (1920–2002)

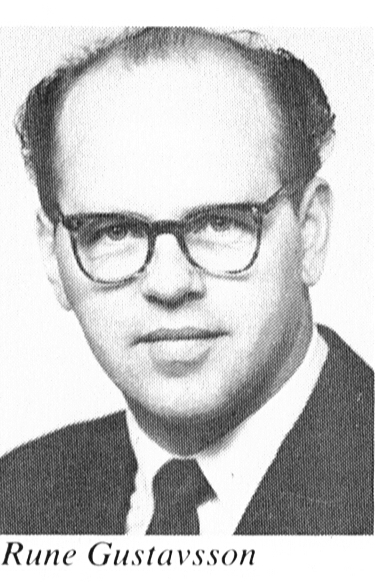

Minister of Health and Social Affairs
- In office 1976–1978
- Prime Minister: Thorbjörn Fälldin
- Preceded by: Sven Aspling
- Succeeded by: Gabriel Romanus

Personal details
- Born: December 2, 1920 Skatelöv Parish, Kronoberg County, Sweden
- Died: April 30, 2002 (aged 81) Alvesta, Kronoberg County, Sweden
- Party: Centre Party

Karl Rune Gustavsson (2 December 1920– 30 April 2002) was a Swedish politician. A member of the Centre Party he served at the Parliament from 1958 to 1986, and was Minister for social affairs from 1976 to 1978, in the Fälldin I Cabinet.
