= Elsa Widding =

Swedish politician (born 1968)

Member of the Riksdag
- In office 26 September 2022 – 28 September 2026
- Constituency: Stockholm County

Personal details
- Born: 24 January 1968 (age 58) Gothenburg, Sweden
- Party: Ambition Sweden (2025–present)
- Other political affiliations: Sweden Democrats (2022–April 2023) Independent (2023); MoD (January 2024)
- Education: Chalmers University of Technology
- Occupation: Engineer, energy consultant

Elsa Britt Madeleine Olefjord Widding (born 24 January 1968) is a Swedish politician, author and commentator.

She was an advisor to the Swedish government on energy and infrastructure issues, and gained public notice in 2009 for her opposition to the state-run energy company Vattenfall buying out Dutch energy company Nuon due to the financial consequences of the decision which became known as the Nuon affair. In the 2022 Swedish general election, she became a member of the Riksdag for the Stockholm County constituency representing the Sweden Democrats. On 1 May 2023, she left the party to become an independent politician.

== Biography ==
=== Education and professional work ===
Widding holds a master's degree in engineering and environmental sciences from Chalmers University of Technology which she gained in 1993 and then a degree in business from INSEAD. She worked in the energy sector, first for the Norwegian energy supplier Statkraft and then for various positions at Vattenfall. Between 2008 and 2010, she was a government advisor to Sweden's Ministry of Enterprise, Energy and Communications and since 2014 has been a private consultant to energy companies.

=== Commentary and views ===
Widding gained some public prominence in Sweden in 2009 for opposing Vattenfall's buyout of Dutch energy company Nuon (now known as Vattenfall Nederland). Widding argued that Vattenfall would see a financial loss following the takeover and wrote to Vattenfall's then CFO Dag Andresen warning about the deal and stated that, in order to meet its return requirements, Vattenfall should pay a maximum of 70 billion kronor. After the deal, Vattenfall was forced to heavily write down the value of Nuon, which drastically worsened Vattenfall's finances. Vattenfall former CEO Lars Westerberg later testified that Widding had been right in her prediction. For her views, she was 2015 named "Sweden's rowdiest woman" by Passion for Business magazine.

In 2015, she wrote in an article for Svenska Dagbladet criticising Vattenfall's involvement in winding down coal power in Germany, which she stated was too short-term. She argued Sweden should "put on the leader's jersey and instead of shirking responsibility and just selling the coal power plants, find a way to speed up the conversion of these so that they can run them fossil-free within a reasonable time." In 2019, she campaigned against Sweden's proposal to close down some of its nuclear power plants in favour of wind energy.

During her career, Widding began sharing her commentary regarding energy and climate change on her personal YouTube channel and on articles for the Klimatrealistern blogsite, the latter of which has been described as expressing climate change scepticism. Widding has stated that she is not a climate change denier and supports increased use of renewable energy and environmental protection, but has claimed climate change activism has promoted alarmist messages presented by the media that Widding claims are highly misleading to both decision-makers and the public.

=== Politics ===
For the 2022 Swedish general election, Widding stood as a candidate for the Sweden Democrats party in the Stockholm County constituency and was elected to the Riksdag.

In 2023, Widding received criticism from other Swedish politicians including Liberal Party Minister Mats Persson after attending the Spotlight conference in Norway which has been accused of promoting conspiracy theories. Widding stated she was unaware of the organizer's beliefs and criticised Persson back, accusing him of misrepresenting her views. Following the controversy Widding announced she was leaving the Sweden Democrats after accusing the party of not supporting her, claiming "SD supports the government through the Tidö Agreement. But I would have expected my party to distance itself from these abominable pretensions of which the leading representatives of the Liberals are guilty." She also affirmed that she would remain in the Riksdag as an independent MP but continuing to vote with the SD and the Moderate-led coalition. The SD responded by stating that they respected her decision but hoped that she return her seat to the party.

She was a member of MoD for 11 days, from 15 January to 26 January 2024, saying she made a mistake joining the party when revelations were made that the party is vaccine-skeptical. On 14 May 2025 she announced she is forming a new party to contest the 2026 elections. The party was first named Sverige först ('Sweden first'), but later changed name to Ambition Sweden.

== See also ==
- List of members of the Riksdag, 2022–2026
