= Bo Frank =

Swedish politician

Bo Carl Gunnar Frank (born 17 September 1954 in Älvsborg County) is a Swedish politician of the Moderate Party who served as Governing Mayor of Växjö Municipality from 2006 to 2016. He is now the President (Mayor) of the City Council, a non-executive position.

From 1991 to 1993, Frank was a member of parliament (Riksdag) for Kronoberg County. Frank served as councillor in opposition in Växjö until 2006. After the 2006 elections, Bo Frank was elected governing mayor in Växjö, and was leader of the Moderate supported (M, C, FP and KD) alliance in the city council. A position he held onto also after the 2010 elections, and after the 2014 elections. He announced his resignation in September 2016, taking effect on 31 December 2016. He was succeeded by Anna Tenje in the position.
