= Carina Adolfsson Elgestam =

Swedish politician (born 1959)

Carina Adolfsson Elgestam (born 1959) is a Swedish Social Democratic politician and former parliamentarian. She served as a member of the Riksdag from 1998 until her retirement in 2016.

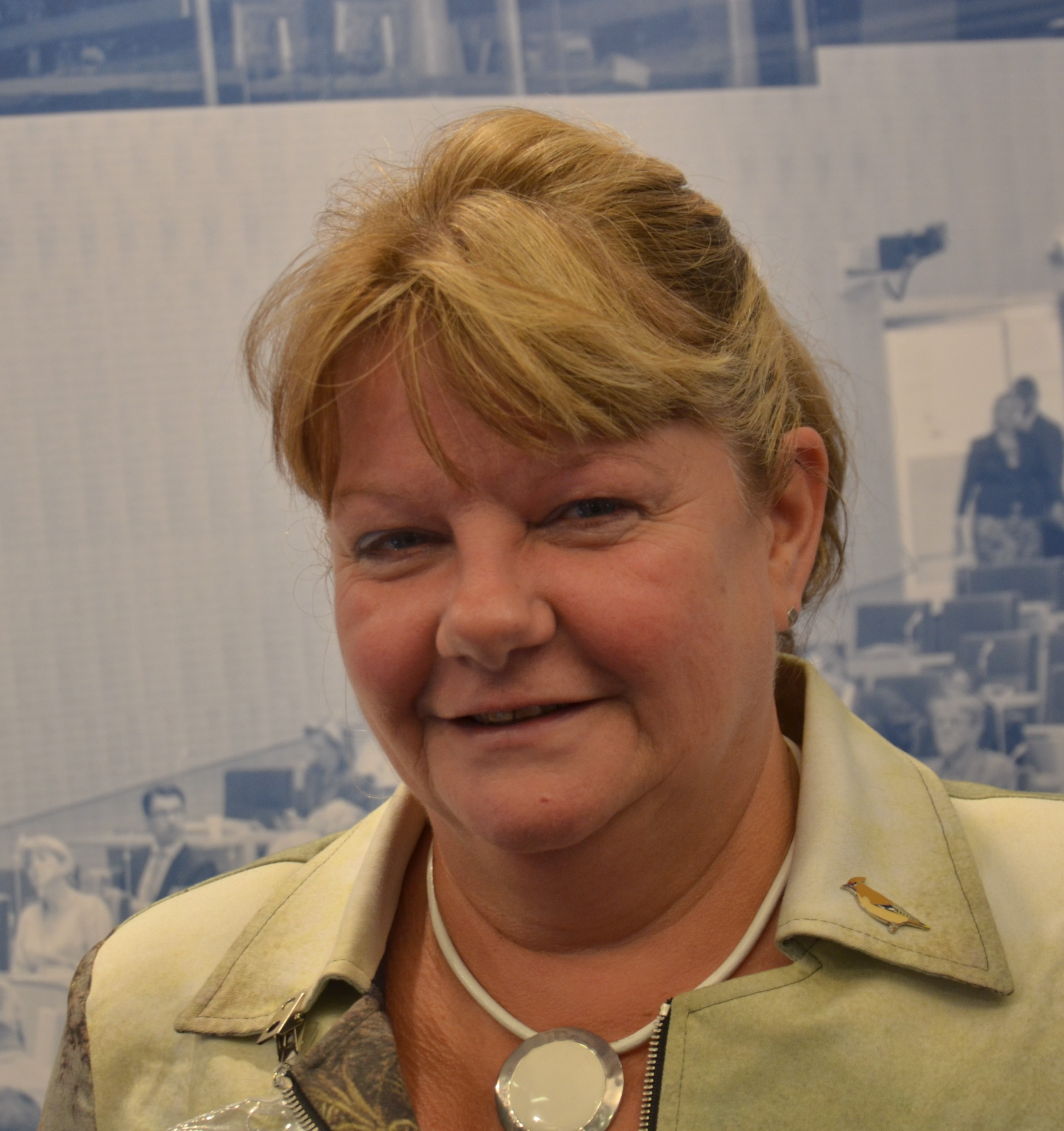
Carina Adolfsson Elgestam, is a Swedish politician.
