= Alvesta Municipality =

Alvesta Municipality Alvesta kommun
- Municipality
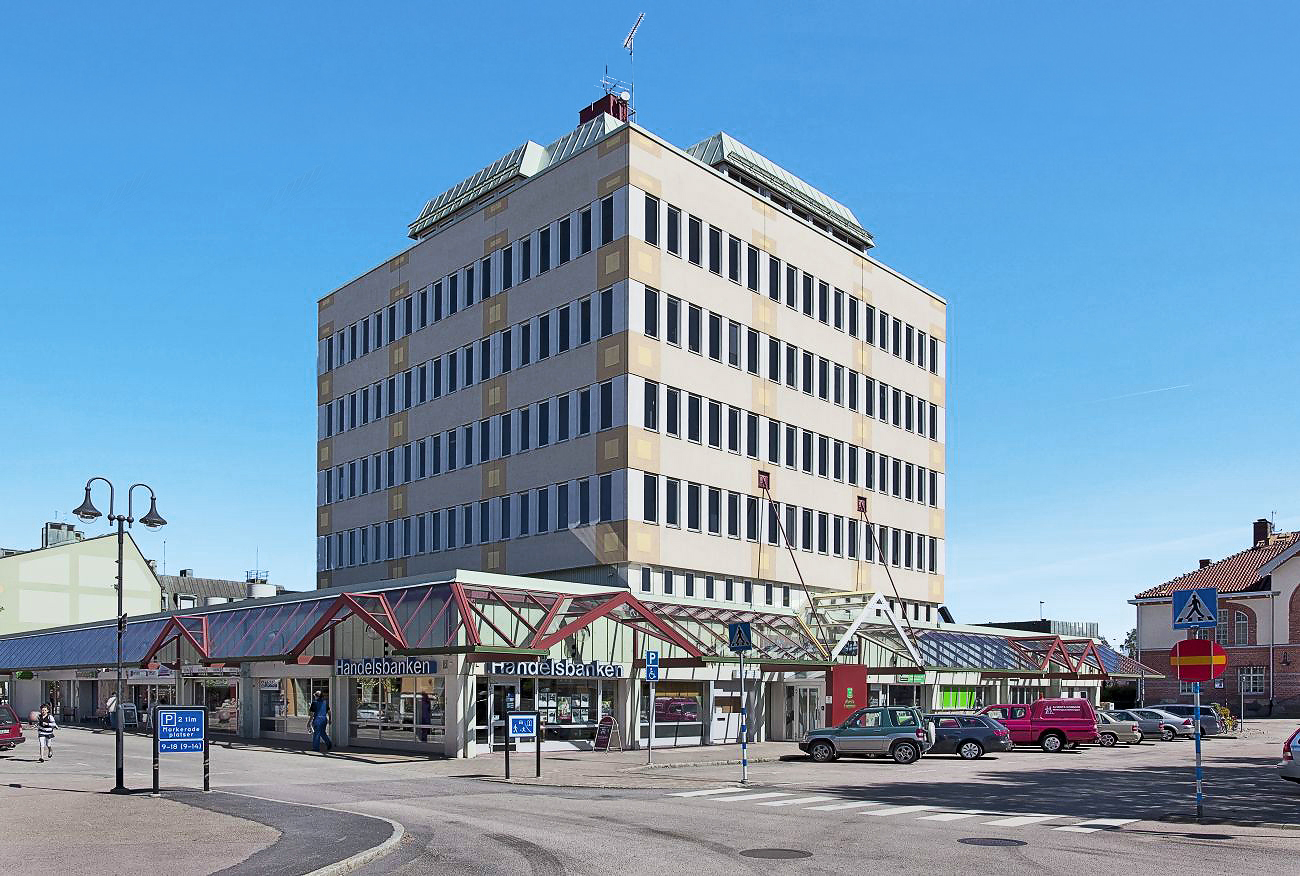
- Alvesta town hall

- Coat of arms

- Coordinates: 56°54′N 14°33′E
- Country: Sweden
- County: Kronoberg County
- Seat: Alvesta

Area
  - Total: 1,074.26 km^{2} (414.77 sq mi)
  - Land: 974.19 km^{2} (376.14 sq mi)
  - Water: 100.07 km^{2} (38.64 sq mi)
- Area as of 1 January 2014.

Population (30 June 2025)
  - Total: 19,816
  - Density: 20.341/km^{2} (52.683/sq mi)
- Time zone: UTC+1 (CET)
  - Summer (DST): UTC+2 (CEST)
- ISO 3166 code: SE
- Province: Småland
- Municipal code: 0764
- Website: www.alvesta.se

Alvesta Municipality (Swedish: Alvesta kommun) is a municipality in Kronoberg County, southern Sweden. Its seat is in Alvesta.

The present municipality was created in 1971, when the market town (köping) Alvesta (instituted in 1945) was amalgamated with four surrounding rural municipalities. Amalgamations had also taken place in 1952 and 1963. The number of original local government entities within the present municipality is twelve.

The municipal arms are from 1951 and depict three bees and a winged wheel. This symbolizes the railway that is so vital for the industry, while the bees signify the hard-working spirit that the locals pride themselves with.

The municipality boasts nature areas and is suitable for fishing, canoeing or playing golf.

The mansion of Huseby is a popular place to visit, located some 15 kilometers south of the town Alvesta, and hosts a couple of museums. There are also old churches scattered around the municipality, some medieval, among them the Alvesta Church.

== Localities ==
There are 6 urban areas (or tätort) in Alvesta Municipality.

In the table the localities are listed according to the size of the population as of December 31, 2005. The municipal seat is in bold characters.

#	Locality	Population
1	**Alvesta**	7,647
2	Moheda	1,852
3	Vislanda	1,773
4	Grimslöv	638
5	Torpsbruk	354
6	Hjortsberga	229

== Demographics ==
This is a demographic table based on Alvesta Municipality's electoral districts in the 2022 Swedish general election sourced from SVT's election platform, in turn taken from SCB official statistics.

In total there were 20,256 inhabitants, including 14,578 Swedish citizens of voting age. 42.0% voted for the left coalition and 56.0% for the right coalition. Indicators are in percentage points except population totals and income.

Location	Residents	Citizen adults	Left vote	Right vote	Employed	Swedish parents	Foreign heritage	Income SEK	Degree
Location			%	%					
Alvesta N	2,001	1,268	51.4	43.7	60	39	61	17,538	25
Alvesta S-Blädinge	2,673	1,893	48.7	48.3	74	60	40	21,641	32
Alvesta V	1,966	1,280	53.5	41.2	68	45	55	22,221	25
Aringsås	1,871	1,362	41.1	58.2	87	79	21	27,599	41
Hjortsberga	987	745	31.8	66.5	89	89	11	27,377	34
Lekaryd-Härlöv	2,089	1,514	39.1	58.9	90	81	19	28,830	41
Moheda Ö	1,228	956	43.0	55.9	88	90	10	27,395	31
Skatelöv	1,548	1,189	37.8	61.1	86	93	7	26,906	32
Slätthög-Mistelås	2,352	1,773	37.6	61.6	86	89	11	23,855	32
Vislanda	2,419	1,753	36.5	62.3	84	81	19	25,350	25
Västra Torsås	1,122	845	39.5	59.4	83	88	12	23,676	29
Source: SVT

== Notable natives ==
Some well-known natives of Alvesta are the national famous magician Joe Labero and the ATP tennis player Jonas Björkman. The former world #1 in the same sport, Mats Wilander, was originally from Torpsbruk in the north part of the municipality.

Swan J. Turnblad (1860–1933) American newspaper publisher associated with Svenska Amerikanska Posten, a Swedish language newspaper once published in Minneapolis, Minnesota, was born in Tubbemåla in Vislanda parish.

== Politics ==
Result of the 2010 election:

- Moderate Party 30,28%
- Centre party 11,24%
- Liberal People's Party 4,69%
- Christian Democrats 5,42%
- Swedish Social Democratic Party 30,95%
- Left Party 4,50%
- Green Party 4,33%
- Sweden Democrats 7,82%
- Other Parties 0,76%
