= Tomas Eneroth =

Swedish politician (born 1966)

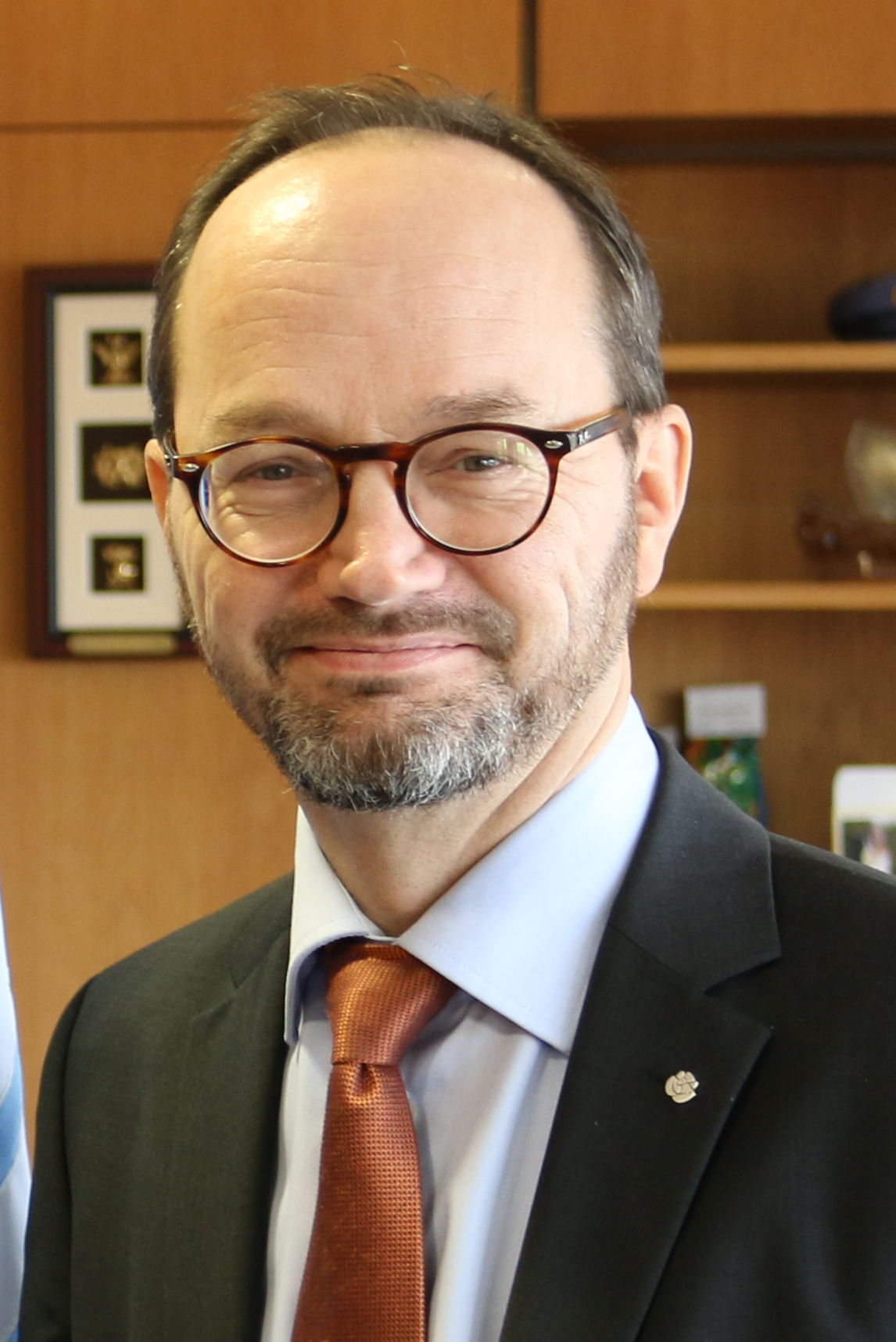
- Eneroth in London in 2017

Minister for Infrastructure
- In office 27 July 2017 – 17 October 2022
- Prime Minister: Stefan Löfven; Magdalena Andersson
- Preceded by: Anna Johansson
- Succeeded by: Andreas Carlson

Leader of the Social Democrats in the Riksdag
- In office 3 October 2014 – 27 July 2017
- Preceded by: Mikael Damberg
- Succeeded by: Anders Ygeman

Member of the Riksdag
- In office 3 October 1994 – 14 April 2025
- Constituency: Kronoberg County

Personal details
- Born: 4 December 1966 (age 59) Växjö, Sweden
- Party: Social Democratic
- Education: Linnaeus University, formerly Högskolan i Växjö

Karl Tomas Eneroth (born 4 December 1966) is a Swedish former politician of the Social Democrats who served as Minister for Infrastructure from 2017 to 2022, leader of the Social Democrats in the Swedish Riksdag from 2014 to 2017 and Member of the Riksdag from 1994 to 2025, representing Kronoberg County. He was President by age in the Riksdag from 2022 to 2025.

From 2010 to 2014, he served as deputy leader of the Committee on Social Insurance. He has previously been leader of the same committee, as well as leader of the Committee on Industry and Trade. In 2011, he was mentioned as a possible candidate to replace Håkan Juholt as leader of the party.

He is currently the chairman of the ABF, the Workers' Educational Association, since 1 May 2025.

Political offices
| Preceded by – | Member of the Riksdag for Kronoberg County; 1994–2025 | Succeeded by Robert Olesen |
| Preceded by Berit Andnor | Chairperson of the Riksdag's Committee on Social Insurance; 2002–2006 | Succeeded by Gunnar Axén |
| Preceded by Sven Brus | Deputy Chairperson of the Riksdag's Committee on Social Insurance; 2006–2008 | Succeeded by Veronica Palm |
| Preceded by Thomas Östros | Deputy Chairperson of the Riksdag's Committee on Industry and Trade; 2008–2010 | Succeeded by Maria Wetterstrand |
| Preceded by Veronica Palm | Deputy Chairperson of the Riksdag's Committee on Social Insurance; 2010–2014 | Succeeded by Elisabeth Svantesson |
| Preceded by Anna Johansson | Minister for Infrastructure; 2017–2022 | Succeeded by Andreas Carlson |
Party political offices
| Preceded by Mikael Damberg | Leader of the Social Democrats in the Riksdag; 2014–2017 | Succeeded by Anders Ygeman |
