= Municipalköping =

Form of municipality in Sweden

Municipalköping was a type of local government (municipality) in Sweden. Mostly these were minor trade towns with very limited city rights (market rights), which were delegated from larger cities in the same region.

In 1863, the first local government acts were implemented in Sweden. Officially, the term municipalköping disappeared with this reform. There were two acts in the 1863 reform, one for towns and one for rural areas. But under the "rural" act there were also eight market towns, which were instituted as municipalities. This third category included köping, municipalköping and municipalsamhälle. Most of the 95 köpingar became municipalities. The last municipalköping was incorporated into a large municipality in 1956.

Those market towns that did not develop into a municipality are now occasionally referred to as municipalköping, which is more a cultural term in the present-day language.

== Settlements that were municipalköpingar ==
Settlement	County (1971)	County (2009)	Inhabitants (2000)	Remarks	Present-day municipality
Bergkvara	Kalmar län	Kalmar län	1,008	terminated as municipalköping in the 1890s municipalsamhälle from 1921 to 1955	Torsås
Båstad	Kristianstads län	Skåne län	4,683	became köping Jan. 1st 1937 and municipality in 1971	Båstad
Figeholm	Kalmar län	Kalmar län	839	became köping Jan. 1st 1878	Oskarshamn
Gamleby	Kalmar län	Kalmar län	2,976	merged with Gamleby (landskommun) Jan 1st 1956	Västervik
Kristianopel	Blekinge län	Blekinge län	80	incorporated in Jämjö municipality Jan 1st 1952	Karlskrona
Ljungby	Kronobergs län	Kronobergs län	14,485	became stad Jan 1st 1936	Ljungby
Mörbylånga	Kalmar län	Kalmar län	1,788	became köping Jan. 1st 1881	Mörbylånga
Nybro	Kalmar län	Kalmar län	12,322	municipalköping Febr. 3rd 1865 became köping April 25, 1879	Nybro
Pataholm	Kalmar län	Kalmar län	20	incorporated in Ålem municipality Jan. 1st 1954	Mönsterås
Påskallavik	Kalmar län	Kalmar län	1,144	incorporated in Döderhult municipality Jan. 1st 1952	Oskarshamn
Trelleborg	Malmöhus län	Skåne län	24,850	became köping Jan. 1st 1843 became stad Jan 1st 1866	Trelleborg
Valdemarsvik	Östergötlands län	Östergötlands län	2,954	became köping Jan. 1st 1914	Valdemarsvik

== See also ==
- Köping
- Municipalities of Sweden
- List of cities in Sweden
- Stad (Sweden)
