= Köping =

Swedish denomination for a market town

Köping was a Swedish denomination for a market town since the Middle Ages. The designation was officially abolished with the municipal reform of 1971, when Sweden was subdivided into the Municipalities of Sweden (currently amounting to 290).

As present-day Finland was once a part of Sweden, the Finnish word kauppala has the same meaning. In modern Finnish, the word kaupunki is the main word for town and city. Swedish köping and the English toponym chipping are also cognates as is the Norwegian word kjøpstad and the Danish toponymical suffix -købing.

== Sweden ==
=== History ===
In 1863 the first local government acts were implemented in Sweden. There were two acts, one for cities and one for rural areas. Of the around 2,500 municipalities, 89 had city rights and thus had the right to call themselves stad (city). Under the "rural" act there were also eight localities given the status of köping, which positioned them between a rural municipality and a town (see municipalköping). The number of localities designated as köping rose dramatically during the 20th century and reached its peak in 1959, when they were 95. Many new settlements during the industrialization of Sweden, as well as some of the suburbs in the metropolitan areas, first received the title of köping and it was also made part of their name (such as Linköping or Nyköping). They later grew further and received town privileges, but kept the köping ending of their names. See the list below. It has been found that a vast majority, nearly 70%, of such designated market-towns lie within an area of 200 km^{2} (77 sq mi) in south-central Sweden, especially in the highly economically productive region immediately west and south of Stockholm, in Södermanland, Örebro, Östergötland, and Jönköping counties.

A large-scale merger of Swedish municipalities in 1971 removed the distinctions between towns, market towns and rural municipalities. Many of the former market towns are now seats of municipalities. In contrast to the term stad, köping is seldom used in everyday speech today.

=== Toponyms containing the word köping ===
==== Municipal Seats ====
- Linköping (104,232 inhabitants)
- Jönköping (89,396)
- Norrköping (87,247)
- Nyköping (29,891)
- Lidköping (25,644)
- Enköping (21,121)
- Köping (17,743)
- Falköping (16,350)
- Söderköping (6,992)

==== Minor Localities ====
- Malmköping (1,977)
- Köpingsvik (599)
- Äsköping (342)

==== Localities/Parishes in the Diocese of Lund ====
- Löddeköpinge (6,290)
- Hököpinge (1,105)
- Dalköpinge
- Kyrkoköpinge
- Sireköpinge
- Stora Köpinge

=== Köping titles issued 1863–1959 ===
County	Köping	From	To	Note
Blekinge County	Kristianopel	see municipalköping		
Blekinge County	Olofström	01.01.1941	31.12.1970	formed a municipality
Blekinge County	Ronneby	1686	30.11.1882	received city privileges
Dalarna County	Avesta	01.01.1907	31.03.1919	received city privileges
Dalarna County	Borlänge	01.01.1898	31.12.1943	received city privileges
Dalarna County	Krylbo	01.01.1919	31.12.1966	merged into Avesta city
Dalarna County	Ludvika	01.01.1915	31.12.1918	received city privileges
Dalarna County	Mora	01.01.1959	31.12.1970	formed a municipality
Dalarna County	Morastrand	01.01.1908	31.12.1958	merged into Mora köping)
Dalarna County	Smedjebacken	01.01.1918	31.12.1970	formed a municipality
Gävleborg County	Björkhamre	01.01.1923	31.12.1941	merged into Bollnäs city
Gävleborg County	Bollnäs	01.01.1906	31.12.1941	received city privileges
Gävleborg County	Ljusdal	01.01.1914	31.12.1970	formed a municipality
Gävleborg County	Sandviken	01.01.1927	31.12.1942	received city privileges
Gävleborg County	Storvik	01.01.1952	31.12.1970	merged into Sandviken Municipality
Gotland County	Slite	01.01.1936	31.12.1970	merged into Gotland Municipality
Halland County	Oskarström	01.01.1947	31.12.1970	formed a municipality; today part of Halmstad Municipality
Jämtland County	Frösön	01.01.1948	31.12.1970	merged into Östersund Municipality
Jämtland County	Sveg	01.01.1937	31.12.1970	formed a municipality; today part of Härjedalen Municipality
Jönköping County	Anderstorp	01.01.1953	31.12.1970	formed a municipality; today part of Gislaved Municipality
Jönköping County	Bodafors	01.01.1930	31.12.1970	merged into Nässjö Municipality
Jönköping County	Gislaved	01.01.1949	31.12.1970	formed a municipality
Jönköping County	Huskvarna	31.12 1907	31.12.1910	received city privileges; today part of Jönköping Municipality
Jönköping County	Mariannelund	01.01.1928	31.12.1970	merged into Eksjö Municipality
Jönköping County	Norrahammar	31.12 1943	31.12.1970	merged into Jönköping Municipality
Jönköping County	Skillingaryd	01.01.1952	31.12.1970	formed a municipality
Jönköping County	Tranås	01.01.1882	31.12.1918	received city privileges
Jönköping County	Vaggeryd	01.01.1952	31.12.1970	formed a municipality
Jönköping County	Vetlanda	01.01.1909	31.12.1919	received city privileges
Jönköping County	Värnamo	1620	31.12.1920	received city privileges
Kalmar County	Emmaboda	01.01.1930	31.12.1970	formed a municipality
Kalmar County	Figeholm	01.01.1878	31.12.1951	merged into Misterhult Municipality, today part of Oskarshamn Municipality; municipalköping prior to 1878
Kalmar County	Gamleby	see municipalköping		
Kalmar County	Hultsfred	01.01.1927	31.12.1970	formed a municipality
Kalmar County	Mönsterås	1620	31.12.1970	formed a municipality
Kalmar County	Mörbylånga	1881	31.12.1951	formed a municipality; municipalköping prior to 1880)
Kalmar County	Nybro	25.04.1879	31.12.1931	received city privileges; previously municipalköping from 1865)
Kalmar County	Pataholm	see municipalköping		
Kalmar County	Påskallavik	see municipalköping		
Kalmar County	Virserum	01.01.1956	31.12.1970	formed a municipality
Kronoberg County	Alvesta	01.01.1945	31.12.1970	formed a municipality
Kronoberg County	Hovmantorp	01.01.1952	31.12.1970	split between Lessebo and Växjö Municipalities)
Kronoberg County	Lenhovda	01.01.1957	31.12.1970	merged into Uppvidinge Municipality
Kronoberg County	Lessebo	01.01.1939	31.12.1970	formed a municipality
Kronoberg County	Ljungby	see municipalköping		
Kronoberg County	Markaryd	01.01.1916	31.12.1970	formed a municipality
Kronoberg County	Ryd (Almundsryd)	01.01.1958	31.12.1970	split between Tingsryd and Älmhult Municipalities)
Kronoberg County	Tingsryd	01.01.1921	31.12.1970	formed a municipality
Kronoberg County	Traryd	01.01.1952	31.12.1970	merged into Markaryd Municipality
Kronoberg County	Åseda	01.01.1943	31.12.1970	merged into Uppvidinge Municipality
Kronoberg County	Älmhult	01.01.1901	31.12.1970	formed a municipality
Norrbotten County	Älvsbyn	01.01.1948	31.12.1970	formed a municipality
Örebro County	Degerfors	01.01.1943	31.12.1970	formed a municipality
Örebro County	Frövi	01.01.1955	31.12.1970	merged into Lindesberg Municipality
Örebro County	Hallsberg	01.01.1908	31.12.1970	formed a municipality
Örebro County	Hällefors	01.01.1950	31.12.1970	formed a municipality
Örebro County	Kopparberg	01.01.1908	31.12.1961	merged into Ljusnarsbergs köping)
Örebro County	Laxå	01.01.1946	31.12.1970	formed a municipality
Örebro County	Ljusnarsberg	01.01.1962	31.12.1970	formed a municipality
Östergötland County	Boxholm	01.01.1947	31.12.1970	formed a municipality
Östergötland County	Finspång	01.01.1942	31.12.1970	formed a municipality
Östergötland County	Motala	1820	31.12.1880	received city privileges
Östergötland County	Valdemarsvik	01.01.1914	31.12.1970	formed a municipality; prior to 1914 municipalköping; oldest köping charter from 1647)
Östergötland County	Åtvidaberg	01.01.1947	31.12.1970	formed a municipality
Skåne County	Bjuv	01.01.1946	31.12.1970	formed a municipality
Skåne County	Bromölla	01.01.1942	31.12.1970	formed a municipality
Skåne County	Båstad	01.01.1937	31.12.1970	formed a municipality; before 1937 municipalköping)
Skåne County	Eslöv	01.01.1875	31.12.1910	received city privileges
Skåne County	Furulund	01.01.1952	31.12.1968	merged into Kävlinge köping)
Skåne County	Hässleholm	01.01.1901	31.12.1913	received city privileges
Skåne County	Hörby	01.01.1900	31.12.1970	formed a municipality
Skåne County	Höör	01.01.1939	31.12.1970	formed a municipality
Skåne County	Klippan	01.01.1945	31.12.1970	formed a municipality
Skåne County	Kävlinge	01.01.1946	31.12.1970	formed a municipality
Skåne County	Limhamn	01.01.1906	31.12.1914	merged into Malmö city
Skåne County	Lomma	01.01.1951	31.12.1970	formed a municipality
Skåne County	Osby	01.01.1937	31.12.1970	formed a municipality
Skåne County	Perstorp	01.01.1947	31.12.1970	formed a municipality
Skåne County	Sjöbo	01.01.1952	31.12.1970	formed a municipality
Skåne County	Skurup	01.01.1914	31.12.1970	formed a municipality
Skåne County	Svedala	01.01.1919	31.12.1970	formed a municipality
Skåne County	Tomelilla	01.01.1921	31.12.1970	formed a municipality
Skåne County	Trelleborg	see municipalköping		
Skåne County	Vinslöv	01.01.1934	31.12.1970	formed a municipality
Skåne County	Åhus	01.01.1905	31.12.1970	merged into Kristianstad Municipality
Skåne County	Åstorp	01.01.1946	31.12.1970	formed a municipality
Södermanland County	Gnesta	01.01.1955	31.12.1970	formed a municipality
Södermanland County	Malmköping	1784	31.12.1970	merged into Flen Municipality
Stockholm County	Danderyd	01.01.1946	31.12.1970	became municipality
Stockholm County	Djursholm	01.01.1901	31.12.1913	received city privileges; today part of Danderyd Municipality
Stockholm County	Hässelby Villastad	01.01.1926	01.01.1948	merged into Stockholm City
Stockholm County	Lidingö	01.01.1910	31.12.1925	received city privileges
Stockholm County	Nynäshamn	01.01.1911	31.12.1945	received city privileges
Stockholm County	Saltsjöbaden	01.01.1909	31.12.1970	merged into Nacka Municipality
Stockholm County	Sollentuna	01.01.1944	31.12.1970	formed a municipality
Stockholm County	Stocksund	01.01.1910	31.12.1966	merged into Djursholm city; today part of Danderyd Municipality
Stockholm County	Sundbyberg	01.01.1888	31.12.1926	received city privileges
Stockholm County	Täby	01.01.1948	31.12.1970	formed a municipality
Uppsala County	Tierp	01.01.1920	31.12.1970	formed a municipality
Värmland County	Arvika	1811	31.12 1910	received city privileges
Värmland County	Grums	01.01.1948	31.12.1970	formed a municipality
Värmland County	Hammarö	01.01.1950	31.12.1970	formed a municipality
Värmland County	Munkfors	01.01.1949	31.12.1970	formed a municipality
Värmland County	Storfors	01.01.1950	31.12.1970	formed a municipality
Värmland County	Sunne	01.01.1920	31.12.1970	formed a municipality
Värmland County	Säffle	01.01.1882	31.12.1950	received city privileges
Värmland County	Årjäng	01.01.1941	31.12.1970	formed a municipality
Västerbotten County	Holmsund	01.01.1947	31.12.1970	formed a municipality; today part of Umeå Municipality
Västerbotten County	Lycksele	01.01.1929	31.12.1945	received city privileges
Västerbotten County	Vilhelmina	01.01.1947	31.12.1970	formed a municipality
Västerbotten County	Vännäs	01.01.1928	31.12.1970	formed a municipality
Västerbotten County	Åsele	01.01.1952	31.12.1970	formed a municipality
Västernorrland County	Skön	01.01.1952	31.12.1964	merged into Sundsvall city
Västernorrland County	Sollefteå	01.01.1902	31.12.1916	received city privileges
Västernorrland County	Timrå	01.01.1947	31.12.1970	formed a municipality
Västernorrland County	Ånge	01.01.1946	31.12.1970	formed a municipality
Västernorrland County	Örnsköldsvik	06.12.1842	30.06.1894	received city privileges
Västmanland County	Hallstahammar	01.01.1943	31.12.1970	formed a municipality
Västmanland County	Kungsör	01.01.1907	31.12.1970	formed a municipality
Västmanland County	Norberg	01.01.1952	31.12.1970	formed a municipality
Västra Götaland County	Bengtsfors	01.01.1926	31.12.1970	formed a municipality
Västra Götaland County	Grebbestad	01.01.1929	31.12.1951	merged into Tanum Municipality
Västra Götaland County	Grästorp	01.01.1900	31.12.1970	formed a municipality
Västra Götaland County	Götene	01.01.1952	31.12.1970	formed a municipality
Västra Götaland County	Herrljunga	01.01.1952	31.12.1970	formed a municipality
Västra Götaland County	Kinna	01.01.1947	31.12.1970	merged into Mark Municipality
Västra Götaland County	Lilla Edet	01.01.1951	31.12.1970	formed a municipality
Västra Götaland County	Mellerud	01.01.1908	31.12.1970	formed a municipality
Västra Götaland County	Skene	01.01.1951	31.12.1970	merged into Mark Municipality
Västra Götaland County	Svenljunga	01.01.1946	31.12.1970	formed a municipality
Västra Götaland County	Tibro	01.01.1947	31.12.1970	formed a municipality
Västra Götaland County	Tidaholm	01.01.1895	31.12.1909	received city privileges
Västra Götaland County	Töreboda	01.01.1909	31.12.1970	formed a municipality
Västra Götaland County	Vara	01.01.1894	31.12.1970	formed a municipality

== See also ==
- Municipalities of Sweden
- List of cities in Sweden
- Stad (Sweden)
- Urban areas of Sweden
