= Hammarglo =

Coordinates: 57°04′N 16°30′E

Hammarglo is a small village in Mönsterås kommun, Sweden, situated about 8 kilometers northeast of Mönsterås.

== History ==
Hammarglo is an old village and is named in script from 1351 AD. The oldest building, an old farm house, in the village is from the 15th century.

Until the 1990s the village consisted of small and middle-sized farms. Nowadays most villagers find their occupation in other industries.

== Notable residents ==
Sweden's former environmental minister and former Member of European Parliament Lena Ek, grew up on a farm in the village.
