= Markaryd Municipality =

Markaryd Municipality Markaryds kommun
- Municipality
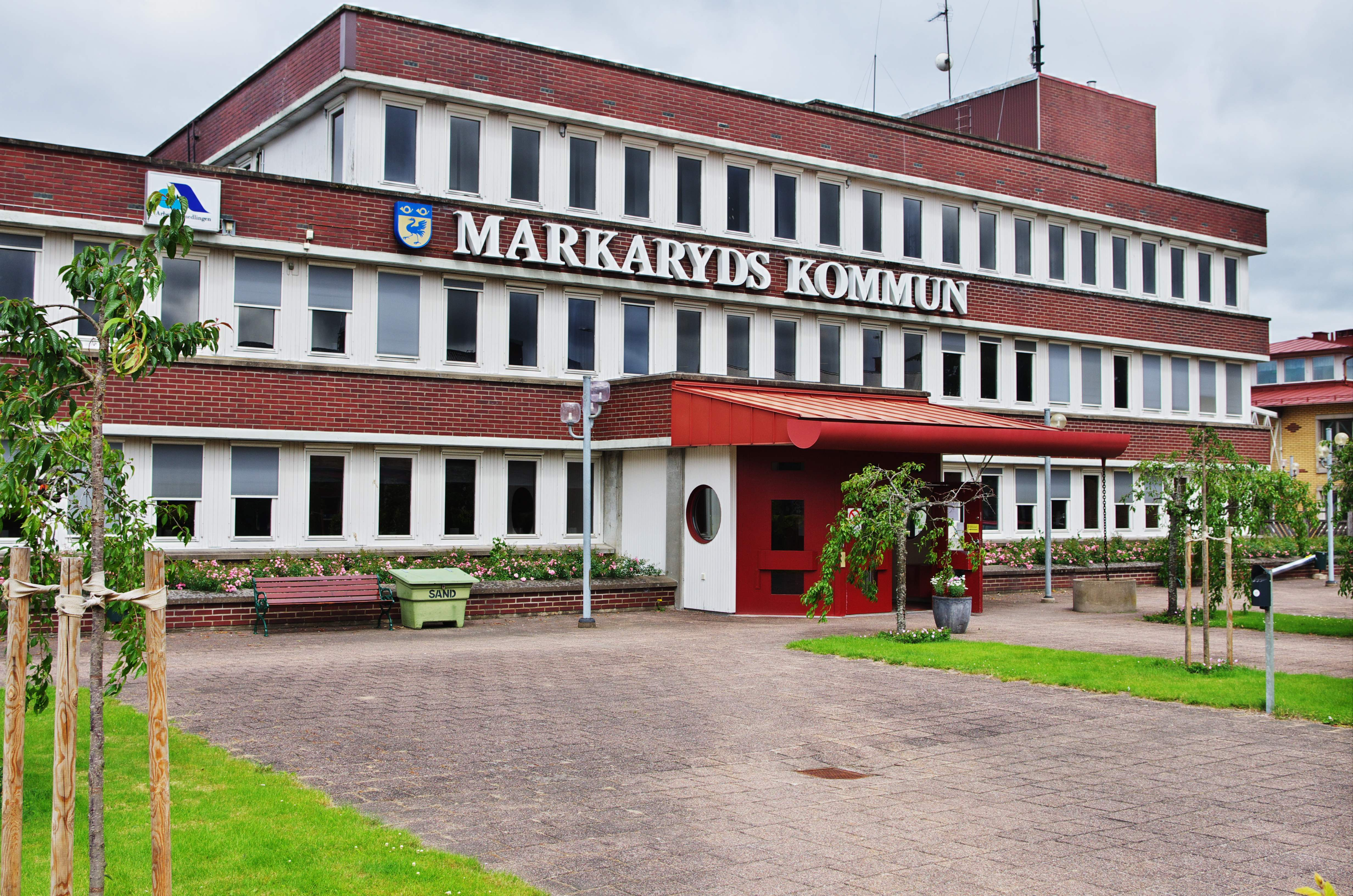
- Markaryd town hall

- Coat of arms

- Coordinates: 56°28′N 13°36′E
- Country: Sweden
- County: Kronoberg County
- Seat: Markaryd

Area
  - Total: 532.83 km^{2} (205.73 sq mi)
  - Land: 517.19 km^{2} (199.69 sq mi)
  - Water: 15.64 km^{2} (6.04 sq mi)
- Area as of 1 January 2014.

Population (30 June 2025)
  - Total: 9,898
  - Density: 19.14/km^{2} (49.57/sq mi)
- Time zone: UTC+1 (CET)
  - Summer (DST): UTC+2 (CEST)
- ISO 3166 code: SE
- Province: Småland
- Municipal code: 0767
- Website: www.markaryd.se

Markaryd Municipality (Swedish: Markaryds kommun) is a municipality in south-west Kronoberg County in southern Sweden, where the town Markaryd is seat.

In 1916 a part of the rural municipality of Markaryd was detached from it, forming a market town (köping) with the same name. The two entities were reunited in 1960. The present municipality was created in 1971, when Traryd and Markaryd were amalgamated.

== Geography ==
The nature is mainly dominated by forests, as usually in Småland, but there are also significant agricultural areas. Stretching from the northern to the southern parts is the river Lagan, making up the foundation of the water system with opportunities for fishing, canoeing and camping. There are also specific areas created for walks in forest and wildlife nature, and just east of the town Markaryd is a possibility for moose safari, arranged by Smalandet.

The European route E4 motorway goes just by the town of Markaryd and also the other town Strömsnäsbruk.

=== Localities ===
There are 4 urban areas (also called a tätort or locality) in Markaryd Municipality.

In the table the localities are listed according to the size of the population as of 31 December 2005. The municipal seat is in bold characters.

#	Locality	Population
1	**Markaryd**	3,826
2	Strömsnäsbruk	2,006
3	Traryd	687
4	Timsfors	609

== Demographics ==
This is a demographic table based on Markaryd Municipality's electoral districts in the 2022 Swedish general election sourced from SVT's election platform, in turn taken from SCB official statistics.

In total there were 10,310 residents, including 7,356 Swedish citizens of voting age. 35.7% voted for the left coalition and 62.7% for the right coalition. Indicators are in percentage points except population totals and income.

Location	Residents	Citizen adults	Left vote	Right vote	Employed	Swedish parents	Foreign heritage	Income SEK	Degree
Location			%	%					
Markaryd V	2,035	1,394	37.2	60.5	78	63	37	22,776	25
Markaryd Ö	2,036	1,591	37.0	62.0	83	78	22	24,241	26
Strömnäsbruk	2,631	1,689	39.0	58.7	66	55	45	20,146	23
Timsfors-Råstorp	2,234	1,707	32.3	66.7	83	83	17	24,130	27
Traryd-Hinneryd	1,374	975	31.7	66.7	77	73	27	21,885	26
Source: SVT
