= Ostkustleden =

Hiking trail in Sweden

Ostkustleden (East Coast Trail)
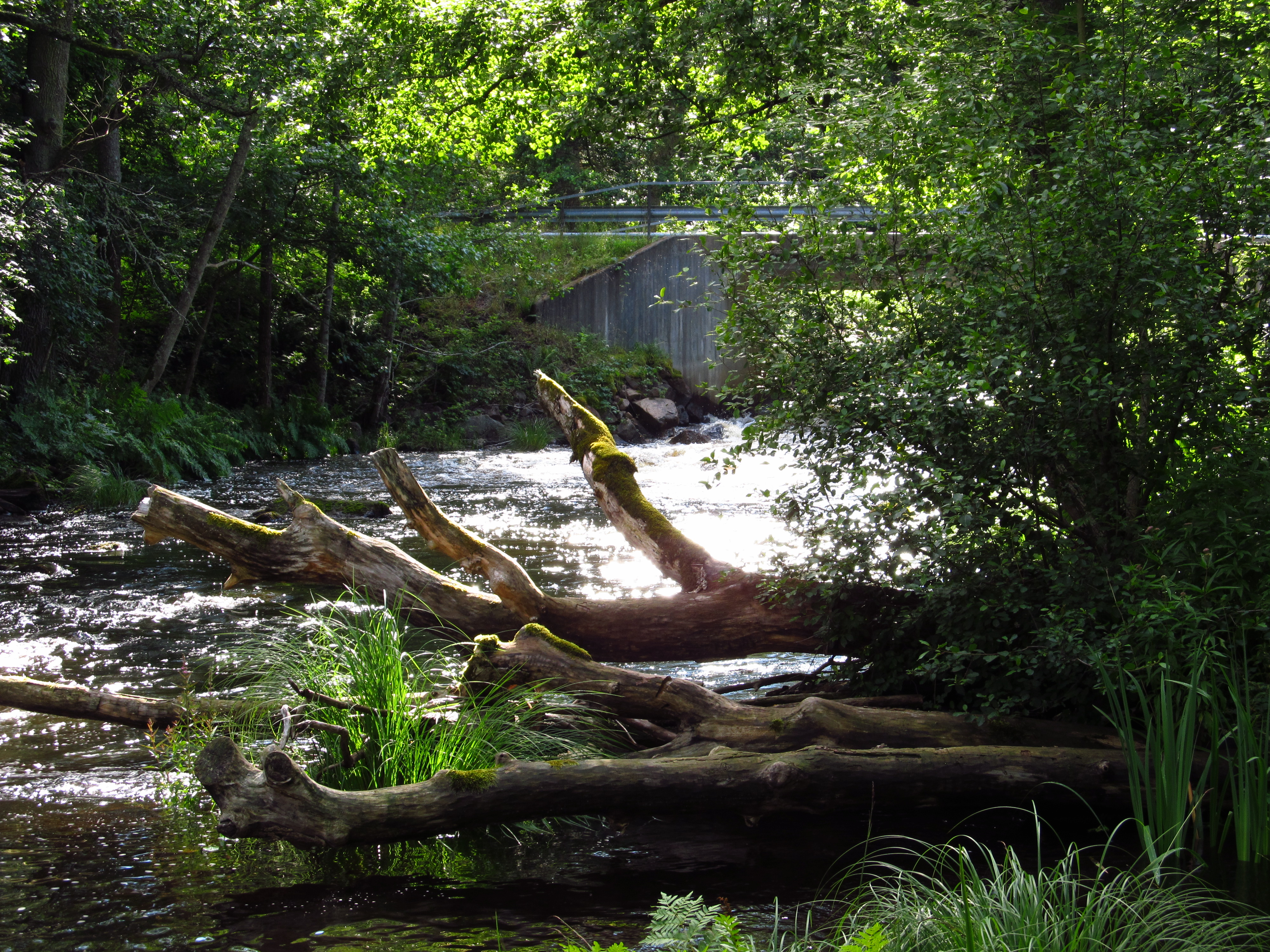
- River Virån along section eight of Ostkustleden.
- Length: 99 mi (159 km)
- Location: Oskarshamn municipality, Småland, Sweden
- Established: 1977
- Trailheads: Lilla Hycklinge, Oskarshamn
- Use: Hiking
- Difficulty: Moderate

Ostkustleden (in English: East Coast Trail) is a 99-mile (160 km) long hiking trail in the south-east of Sweden. The trail extends within the borders of Oskarshamn municipality. Ostkustleden was created between 1970 and 1977 by the environmental nonprofit organization Döderhults naturskyddsförening (the Döderhult´s Society for the Conservation of Nature). The trail starts six miles outside Oskarshamn at Lilla Hycklinge (position: 57.276073°N 16.382375°E). Along the trail there are cabins which can be rented for accommodation.

== Trail Sections ==
Ostkustleden comprises eight sections of trail.

- Section 1: Lilla Hycklinge - Nynäs (10.6 mi, 17 km)
- Section 2: Nynäs – Lönhult (13.4 mi, 21.5 km)
- Section 3: Lönhult – Krokstorp (13 mi, 21 km)
- Section 4: Krokstorp - Mörtfors (10.9 mi, 17.5 km)
- Section 5: Mörtfors - Stjärneberg (11.5 mi, 18.5 km)
- Section 6: Stjärneberg - Lilla Laxemar (11.5 mi, 18.5 km)
- Section 7: Lilla Laxemar - Hällveberg (13 mi, 21 km)
- Section 8: Hedvigsberg - Lilla Hycklinge (11.2 mi, 18 km)
