= Benno Magnusson =

Swedish footballer

Personal information
- Full name: Lars Benno Magnusson
- Date of birth: 4 February 1953 (age 73)
- Place of birth: Blomstermåla, Sweden
- Height: 1.74 m (5 ft 8 1/2 in)
- Position: Winger

Senior career*
Years	Team	Apps	(Gls)
1972–1973	Åtvidabergs FF	52	(11)
1973–1974	1. FC Kaiserslautern	16	(0)
1974–1976	Hertha BSC	22	(1)
1976	Åtvidabergs FF	12	(0)
1976–1981	Kalmar FF	169	(37)

International career
1973–1981	Sweden	14	(0)
- * Club domestic league appearances and goals

Lars Benno Magnusson (born 4 February 1953) is a Swedish former footballer. He's a brother of fellow footballer Roger Magnusson.

Magnusson was a very popular player who got his breakthrough in Åtvidabergs FF when he became a Swedish champion 1972. He later became a professional in West Germany with Hertha BSC and FC Kaiserslautern.

He was a member of the Sweden national team in the 1974 FIFA World Cup.

After his retiring he has made appearances in TV-shows and now works for Svenska spel.

Magnusson played for the club Kalmar FF in the 1970s and 1980s and is regarded as one of the most renowned players in the history of the club.
