= EEBUS =

EEBUS (/iː|iː|bʌs/) is a protocol suite for the Internet of things that aims to standardize the interface between electrical consumers, producers, storages, and (logical) managing entities. It builds on the Internet Protocol and related standards and is meant to be highly generic, cross-domain applicable, open, and free to the public. While its main area of application is energy demand management, data exchange, and control of appliances it is also specified for home automation. A business logic is not specified by EEBUS. The EEBus Initiative e.V. is the non-profit association that manages and supports the standardization of EEBUS.

== History ==
EEBUS was developed in response to the growing number of domain-specific (bus) protocols that made an integration of physical devices into larger systems challenging. As a consequence of the complexity and diversity of individual approaches, the design of integrated systems was, at that time, achieved by proprietary solutions. With the global trends of electrification and energy transition, the need for better system integration of electrical consumers from all industries was perceived as an important goal and thus analyzed in the E-Energy research project Smart Watts. Consequently, manufacturers from the following domains started to collaborate to standardize interfaces:

- White goods
- Heating, ventilation, and air conditioning (HVAC)
- Photovoltaic (and battery) inverters
- Electric vehicles and electric vehicle supply equipment (EVSE, e.g. wall-mounted domestic charging stations)

== Structure of EEBUS ==
The protocol stack is composed of two protocols. On the OSI model's transport layer, the so-called Smart Home IP is used, while the higher-layer functionality is subsumed as SPINE (Smart Premises Interoperable Neutral Message Exchange).

High-level use cases that allow the implementation of a business logic for a company make use of the EEBUS SPINE specification.

Since 2016, all released documents are available free of charge on the website of EEBus Initiative e.V. after free registration: Media & Downloads The specification of the lower ISO/OSI layers and the specification for the application layer are fully released.

== Standardization ==
The standardization of the EEBUS protocol suite is driven by the members of the EEBus Initiative e.V. The collaboration is organized in working groups. The current set of working groups is HVAC, inverters, white goods, grid interaction, and e-mobility. New working groups can be initiated by EEBUS members at will.

Energy management in the context of electric vehicles has been harmonized with ISO 15118. The Ontology of EEBUS has been standardized in the ETSI SAREF standard.

== Adoption ==
=== Membership ===
The number of members varies from year to year and depending on sources, starting from "more than 50" (in 2019), "about 60" (in 2016), or even 70 members (in 2019). The EEBus initiative's website lists 61 members as of 2020.

=== Commercial/industry application ===
The EEBUS standard has been adopted by manufacturers of electric cars, Home Energy Management Systems, HVAC manufacturers, and others. The most prominent example showing the maturity of the EEBUS standard is a fully functional ecosystem involving photovoltaic panels for local electricity generation, an energy manager, charging equipment, and an Audi e-tron. Other examples that build on the same logic include the non-domestic application for cooling supermarkets.

Microsoft has decided to implement EEBUS on their embedded platform Azure Sphere.

In november 2025, NIBE released an open source implementation of EEBUS named OpenEEBUS.

=== Research/academia ===
The standard is also utilized in pan-European research and commercial projects that deal with the integration of different electric appliances at the grid connection point of a dwelling. For instance, an implementation in 240 residential Dutch homes has been successfully tested within the REnovates project.

The Interconnect project has been launched in October 2019 to further specify, implement and test smart grid applications based on EEBUS and KNX to ensure interoperability among different vendors and distribution system operators.

== Partnerships ==
- Open Charge Alliance
- Energy Home
- Open Connectivity Foundation (OCF)
- Thread Group
- ESMIG

== Reception/criticism ==
=== Entry barrier ===
The participation in working groups and the availability of draft and release candidate versions of the specifications is bound to an EEBUS membership. (10,000 EUR per year; 5,000 EUR if the company's annual turnover is below 5 million EUR and the company has less than 50 employees.)

=== No royalty-free reference implementation ===
Former EEBUS member grandcentrix expressed concerns about the lack of a royalty-free reference implementation, saying this was the core reason the standard does not see broader adoption.
