= Emsfors =

- Location within Kalmar Location within Sweden
- Coordinates: 57°09′N 16°27′E
- Country: Sweden
- Province: Småland
- County: Kalmar County
- Municipality: Oskarshamn Municipality and Mönsterås Municipality

Area
  - Total: 0.61 km^{2} (0.24 sq mi)

Population (31 December 2010)
  - Total: 332
  - Density: 542/km^{2} (1,400/sq mi)
- Time zone: UTC+1 (CET)
  - Summer (DST): UTC+2 (CEST)

Flood at Emsfors Bruk in 1935

Emsfors is a bimunicipal locality situated in Oskarshamn Municipality and Mönsterås Municipality in Kalmar County, Sweden with 332 inhabitants in 2010.
