= Valdemarsvik Municipality =

Valdemarsvik Municipality Valdemarsviks kommun
- Municipality
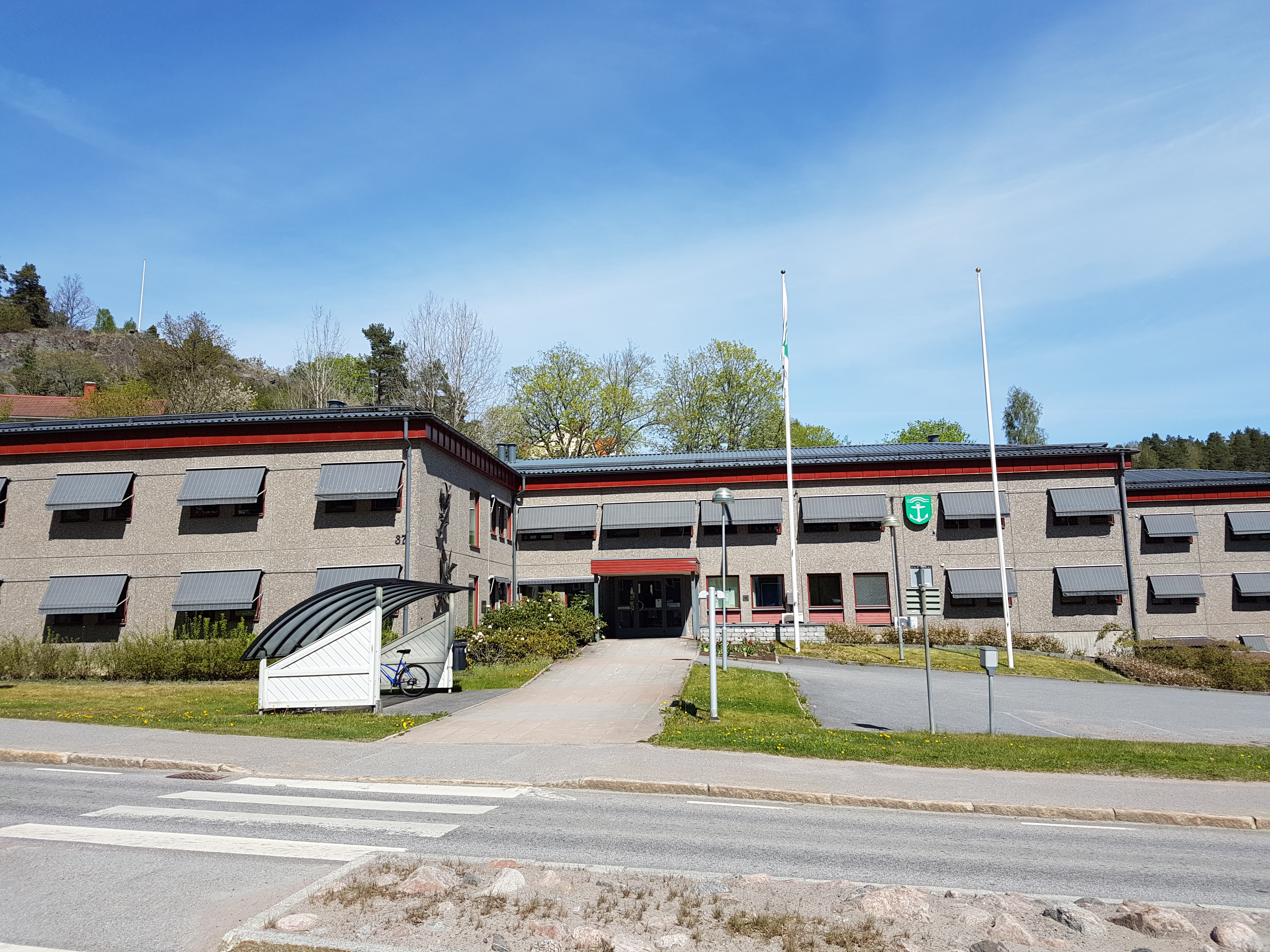
- Valdemarsvik City Hall

- Coat of arms

- Coordinates: 58°12′N 16°36′E
- Country: Sweden
- County: Östergötland County
- Seat: Valdemarsvik

Area
  - Total: 2,049.56 km^{2} (791.34 sq mi)
  - Land: 733.82 km^{2} (283.33 sq mi)
  - Water: 1,315.74 km^{2} (508.01 sq mi)
- Area as of 1 January 2014.

Population (30 June 2025)
  - Total: 7,528
  - Density: 10.26/km^{2} (26.57/sq mi)
- Time zone: UTC+1 (CET)
  - Summer (DST): UTC+2 (CEST)
- ISO 3166 code: SE
- Province: Östergötland and Småland
- Municipal code: 0563
- Website: www.valdemarsvik.se

Valdemarsvik Municipality (Swedish: Valdemarsviks kommun) is a municipality in Östergötland County in southeast Sweden. Its seat is located in the town of Valdemarsvik.

Valdemarsvik was originally a market town (köping) under the city of Söderköping. When the first local government acts came into force in Sweden in 1863 Valdemarsvik was not made a municipality of its own, but part of Ringarum. It was detached from Ringarum in 1914. The municipal reform of 1971 created the present municipality by reuniting Ringarum with Valdemarsvik and also adding Gryt and a part of the dissolved Tjust-Ed. The latter territory was transferred from Kalmar County.

Geographically, it is notable for an archipelago and a harbour.

== Sights ==
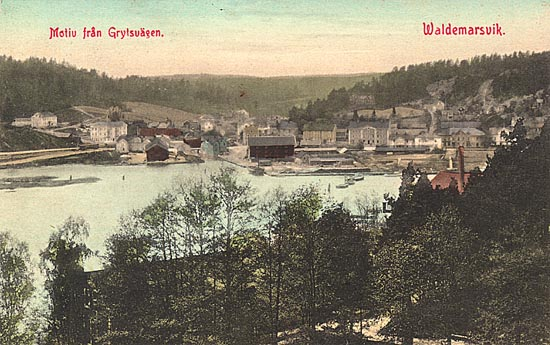
A 1913 postcard from Valdemarsvik

The local church is from the 1870s, with extensive renovations in the early 20th century.

== Notable natives ==
- Lena Ek, former member of the European Parliament and the Riksdag, lives in Valdemarsvik
- Nils Liedholm, professional soccer player, was born and raised in Valdemarsvik

== Demographics ==
This is a demographic table based on Valdemarsvik Municipality's electoral districts in the 2022 Swedish general election sourced from SVT's election platform, in turn taken from SCB official statistics.

In total there were 7,639 residents, including 6,130 Swedish citizens of voting age. 42.4% voted for the left coalition and 56.3% for the right coalition. Indicators are in percentage points except population totals and income.

Location	Residents	Citizen adults	Left vote	Right vote	Employed	Swedish parents	Foreign heritage	Income SEK	Degree
Location			%	%					
Gryt	792	721	36.3	62.3	83	94	6	23,664	34
Gusum	1,694	1,307	42.3	55.5	77	85	15	22,078	22
Ringarum	1,306	1,067	34.4	64.6	85	95	5	24,192	25
Tryserum-Ö Ed	833	703	33.3	65.4	86	95	5	22,737	28
Valdemarsvik 1	1,751	1,389	50.7	48.0	75	83	17	19,661	22
Valdemarsvik 2	1,263	943	49.1	50.3	76	79	21	22,237	25
Source: SVT

== Elections ==
=== Riksdag ===
These are the results of the Riksdag elections of Söderköping Municipality since the 1972 municipality reform. The results of the Sweden Democrats were not published by SCB between 1988 and 1998 at a municipal level to the party's small nationwide size at the time. "Turnout" denotes the percentage of the electorate casting a ballot, whereas "Votes" only denotes valid votes.

Year	Turnout	Votes	V	S	MP	C	L	KD	M	SD	ND
1973	92.8	5,892	3.9	46.5	0.0	30.9	5.3	2.2	11.0	0.0	0.0
1976	93.6	6,229	2.8	46.7	0.0	30.4	5.3	1.9	13.0	0.0	0.0
1979	92.7	6,289	3.5	46.9	0.0	26.2	5.7	1.6	15.2	0.0	0.0
1982	92.9	6,857	3.5	47.8	1.3	23.0	3.9	2.0	18.4	0.0	0.0
1985	91.7	6,047	3.4	48.0	0.9	21.2	8.7	0.0	17.7	0.0	0.0
1988	87.3	5,674	3.3	47.7	4.0	20.8	6.9	2.5	14.7	0.0	0.0
1991	87.5	5,736	2.9	41.8	2.2	16.4	4.7	6.8	16.7	0.0	7.1
1994	87.9	5,817	3.6	47.8	4.7	15.4	2.9	4.5	18.0	0.0	1.5
1998	81.8	5,306	9.2	39.5	3.7	14.0	1.7	11.6	18.4	0.0	0.0
2002	80.6	5,123	5.7	43.4	3.3	15.4	7.7	9.0	13.8	0.4	0.0
2006	82.5	5,214	4.0	40.2	2.7	14.7	4.2	6.6	22.9	2.5	0.0
2010	85.0	5,331	4.1	37.0	4.2	11.9	4.2	5.2	26.2	6.4	0.0
2014	87.1	5,378	3.7	35.3	3.3	10.5	2.8	3.5	20.0	18.5	0.0

Blocs

This lists the relative strength of the socialist and centre-right blocs since 1973, but parties not elected to the Riksdag are inserted as "other", including the Sweden Democrats results from 1988 to 2006, but also the Christian Democrats pre-1991 and the Greens in 1982, 1985 and 1991. The sources are identical to the table above. The coalition or government mandate marked in bold formed the government after the election. New Democracy got elected in 1991 but are still listed as "other" due to the short lifespan of the party. "Elected" is the total number of percentage points from the municipality that went to parties who were elected to the Riksdag.

Year	Turnout	Votes	Left	Right	SD	Other	Elected
1973	92.8	5,892	**50.4**	47.2	0.0	0.6	99.4
1976	93.6	6,229	49.5	**48.7**	0.0	1.8	98.2
1979	92.7	6,289	50.4	**47.1**	0.0	2.5	97.5
1982	92.9	6,857	**51.3**	45.3	0.0	3.4	96.6
1985	91.7	6,047	**51.4**	47.6	0.0	1.0	99.0
1988	87.3	5,674	**55.0**	42.4	0.0	2.6	97.4
1991	87.5	5,736	44.7	**44.6**	0.0	10.7	96.4
1994	87.9	5,817	**56.1**	40.8	0.0	3.1	96.9
1998	81.8	5,306	**52.4**	45.7	0.0	1.9	98.1
2002	80.6	5,123	**52.4**	45.9	0.0	1.7	98.3
2006	82.5	5,214	46.9	**48.4**	0.0	4.7	95.3
2010	85.0	5,331	45.3	**47.5**	6.4	0.8	99.2
2014	87.1	5,378	**42.3**	36.8	18.5	2.4	97.6
