= Traryd =

- Location within Kronoberg Location within Sweden
- Coordinates: 56°35′N 13°47′E
- Country: Sweden
- Province: Småland
- County: Kronoberg County
- Municipality: Markaryd Municipality

Area
  - Total: 1.58 km^{2} (0.61 sq mi)

Population (31 December 2010)
  - Total: 660
  - Density: 418/km^{2} (1,080/sq mi)
- Time zone: UTC+1 (CET)
  - Summer (DST): UTC+2 (CEST)

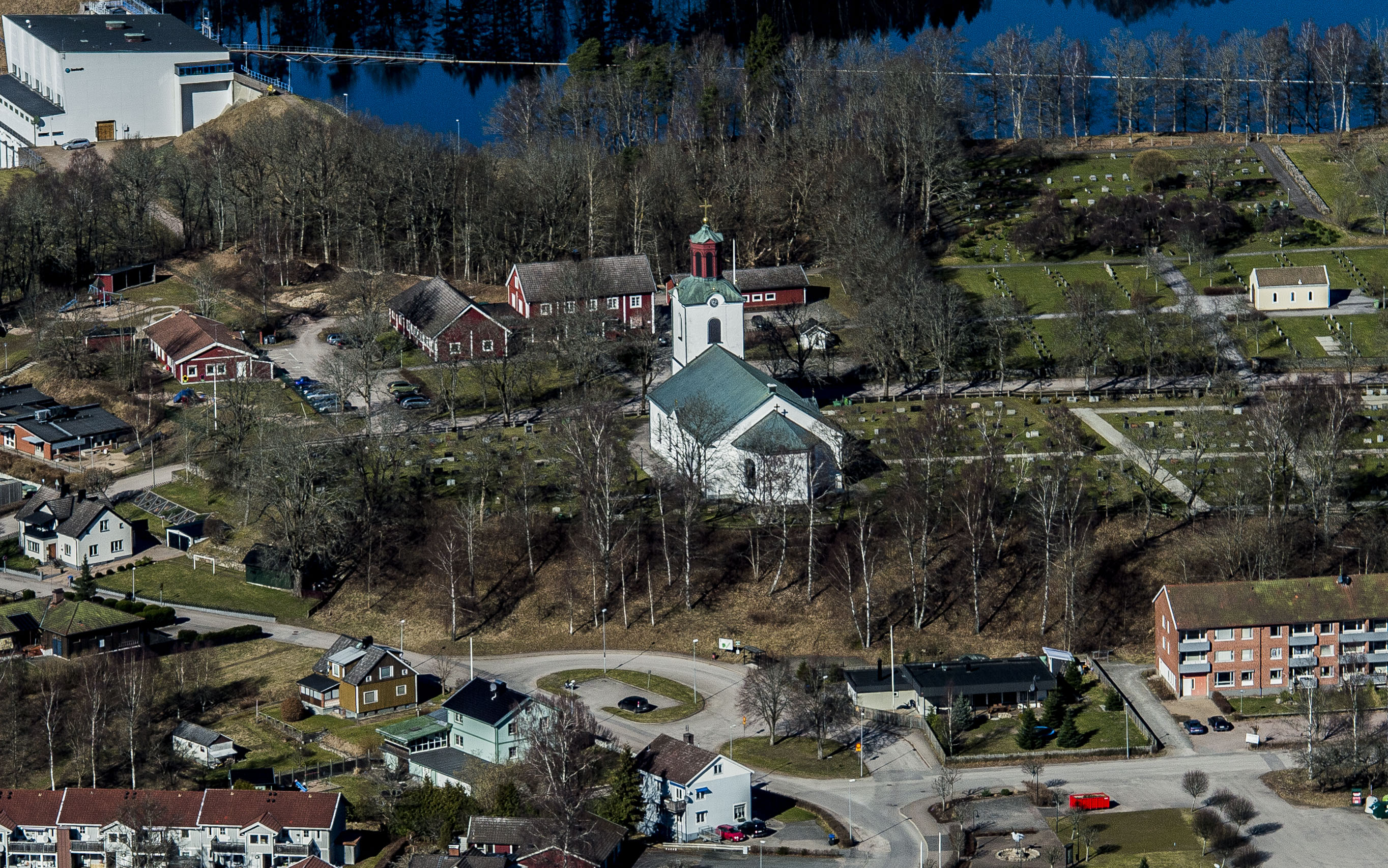
The Traryd church.

Traryd is a locality situated in Markaryd Municipality, Kronoberg County, Sweden with 660 inhabitants in 2010.

== Education ==
The town has a school and a preschool.

== Transport ==
Bus line 150, which runs between Ljungby and Markaryd, stops in Traryd. Another bus, line 149, connects Traryd and Älmhult.
