= Timmernabben =

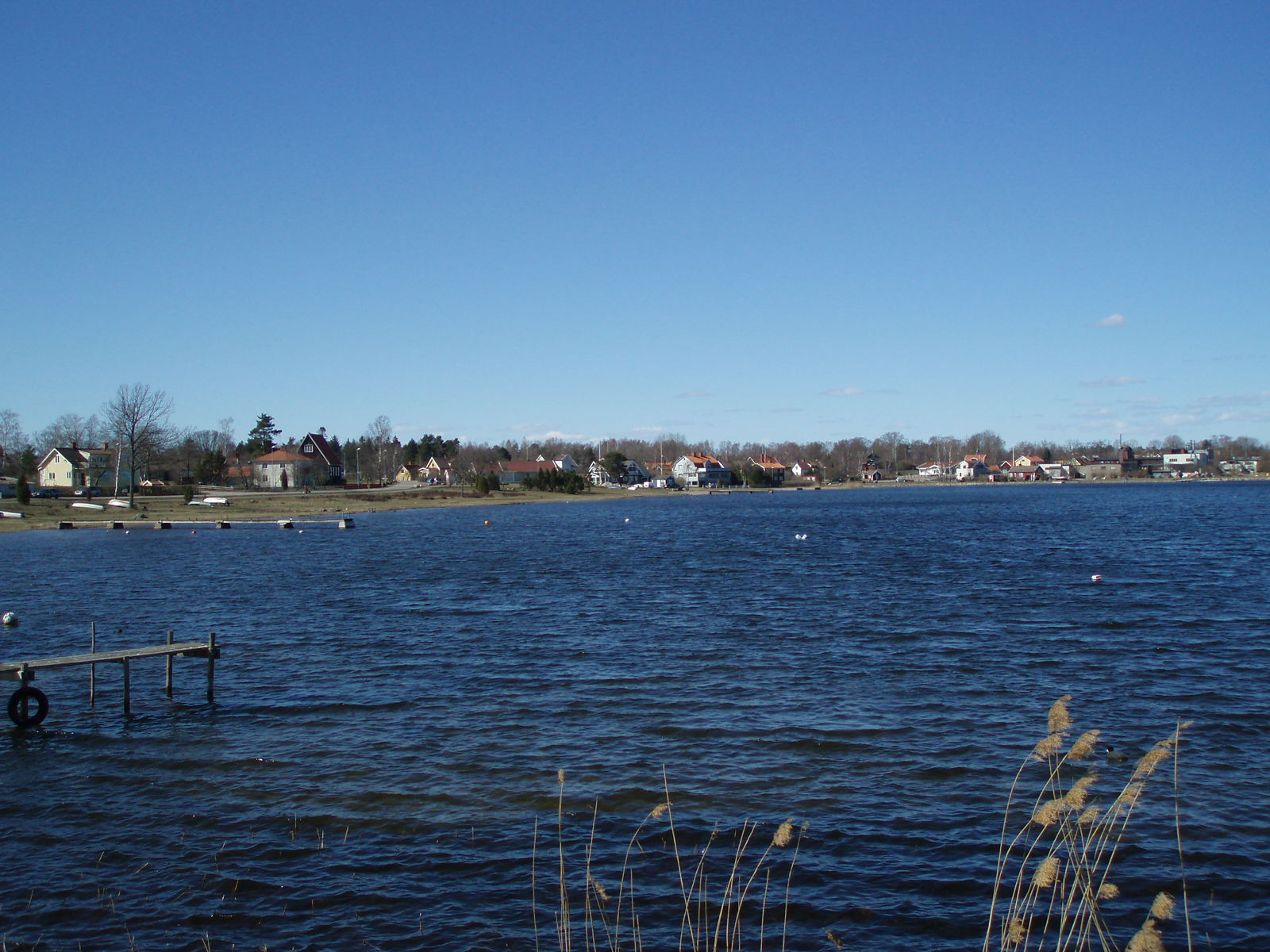

- Location within Kalmar Location within Sweden
- Coordinates: 56°58′N 16°26′E
- Country: Sweden
- Province: Småland
- County: Kalmar County
- Municipality: Mönsterås Municipality

Area
  - Total: 1.49 km^{2} (0.58 sq mi)

Population (31 December 2010)
  - Total: 1,276
  - Density: 858/km^{2} (2,220/sq mi)
- Time zone: UTC+1 (CET)
  - Summer (DST): UTC+2 (CEST)

Timmernabben is a locality situated in Mönsterås Municipality, Kalmar County, Sweden with 1,476 inhabitants in 2022. Nowadays it is mainly a commuter village on the Baltic coast with hardly any own industry or service. The only exceptions are the burnt almond workshop Råsnäs Konfektyrer, the fish smokery Nabbens Rökeri & Fisk, and the ceramics factory Gabriel Keramik.

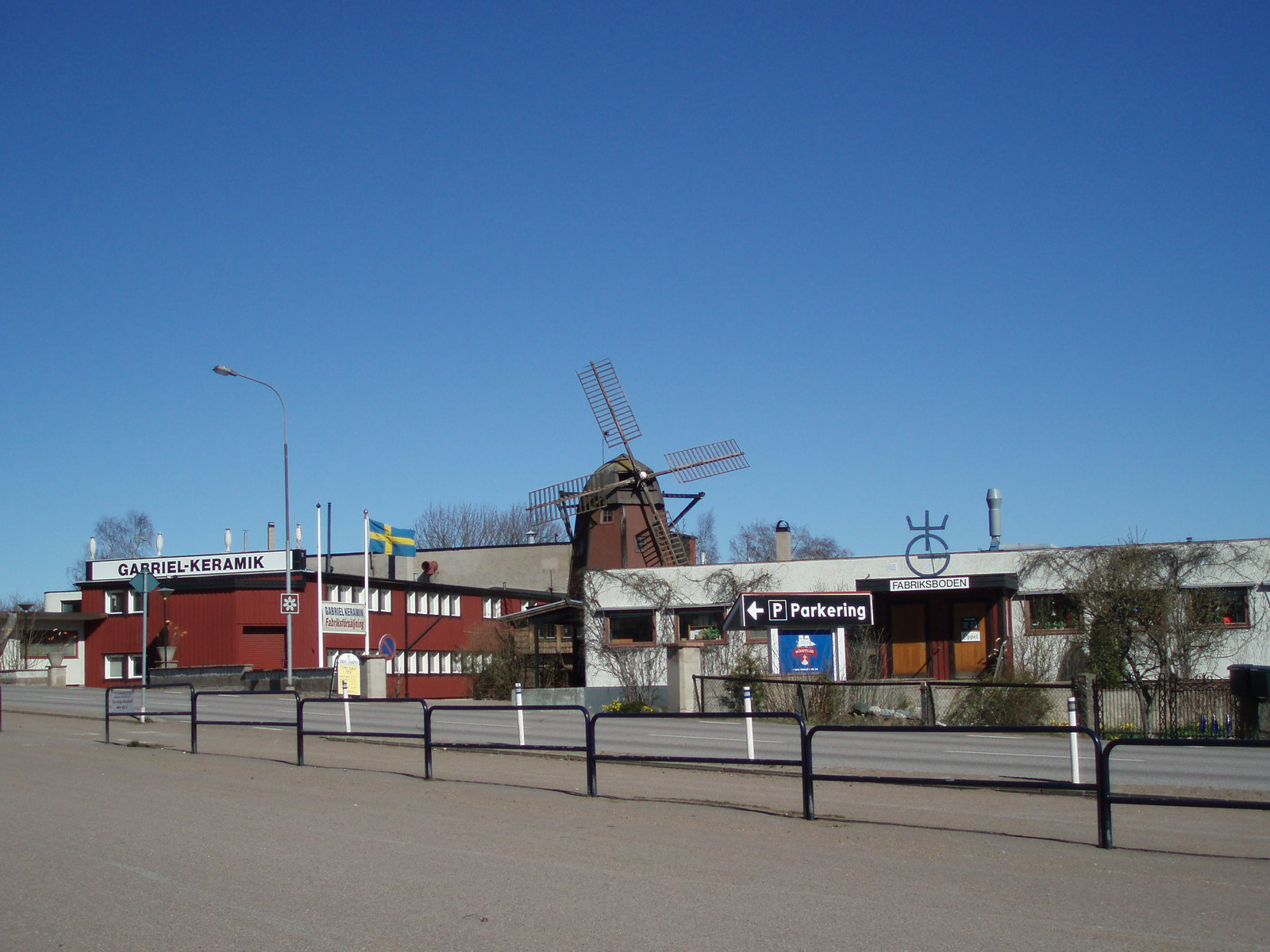
Gabriel Keramik in Timmernabben

The village has a history as a shipping harbor for timber, which has given the name to this settlement: "the peninsula where they ship timber". This activity started in the 1680s and went on to the early 1900s. Shipyards were a related industry that started in the 1840s, 10 years later the small village had three shipping wharves where brigs were built. The Swedish merchant fleet had about 70 ships built in Timmernabben between 1850 and 1900. When steel hulls became commonplace and ships became bigger, the shipping industry vanished as quickly as it had been developed six decades earlier.

Today, the marina and a smaller shipping museum are the only remnants of this seafaring past.

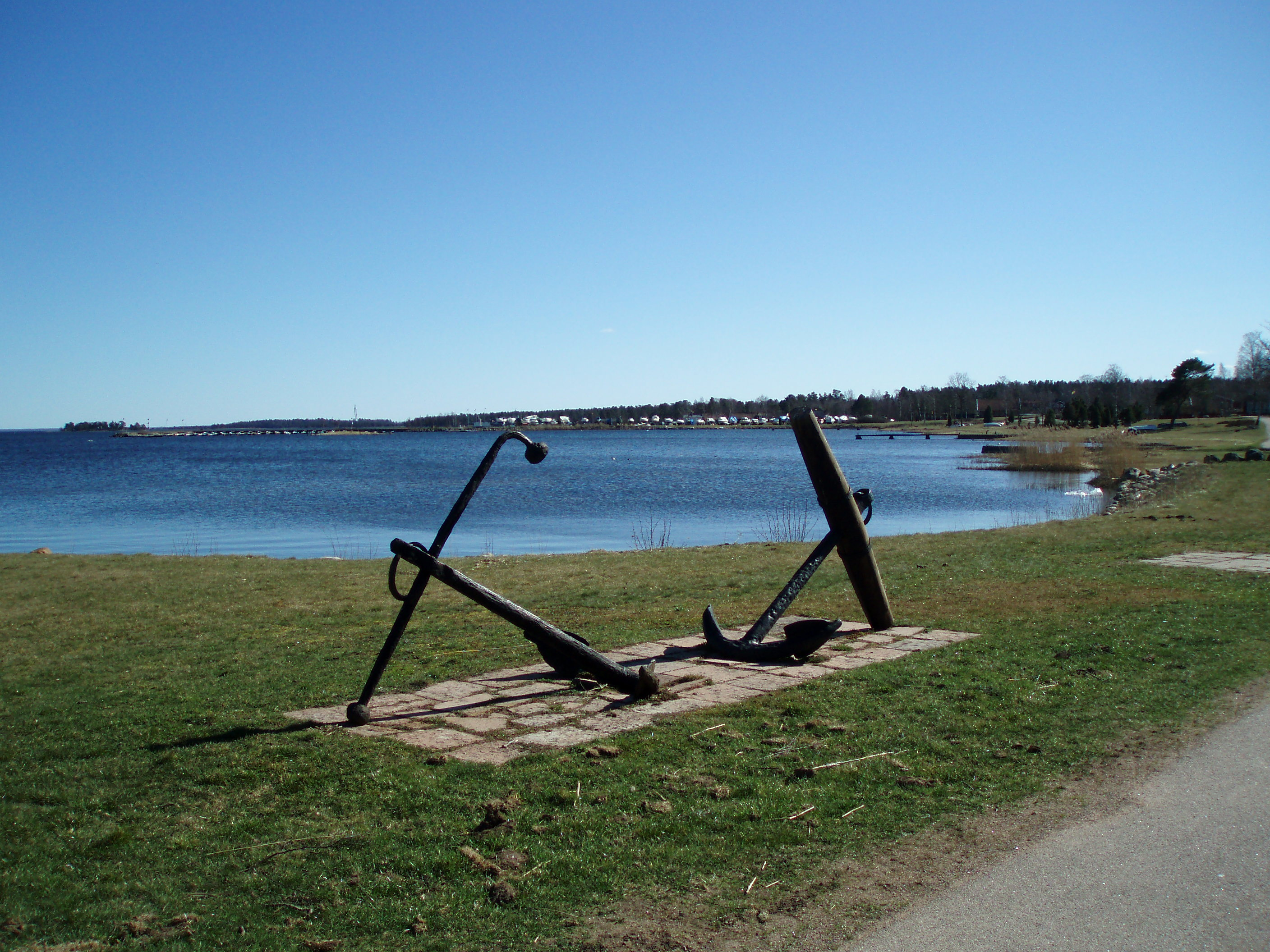
Remnants of Timmernabbens past at sea
