= Saltvik, Sweden =

Saltvik
- Location within Kalmar Location within Sweden
- Coordinates: 57°18′N 16°30′E
- Country: Sweden
- Province: Småland
- County: Kalmar County
- Municipality: Oskarshamn Municipality

Area
  - Total: 0.26 km^{2} (0.10 sq mi)

Population (31 December 2010)
  - Total: 352
  - Density: 1,347/km^{2} (3,490/sq mi)
- Time zone: UTC+1 (CET)
  - Summer (DST): UTC+2 (CEST)

Saltvik is a locality situated in Oskarshamn Municipality, Kalmar County, Sweden with 352 inhabitants in 2010.
