= Timsfors =

- Location within Kronoberg Location within Sweden
- Coordinates: 56°29′N 13°35′E
- Country: Sweden
- Province: Småland
- County: Kronoberg County
- Municipality: Markaryd Municipality

Area
  - Total: 1.02 km^{2} (0.39 sq mi)

Population (31 December 2010)
  - Total: 637
  - Density: 627/km^{2} (1,620/sq mi)
- Time zone: UTC+1 (CET)
  - Summer (DST): UTC+2 (CEST)

Timsfors is a locality situated in Markaryd Municipality, Kronoberg County, Sweden with 637 inhabitants in 2010.
