= Strömsnäsbruk =

- Location within Kronoberg Location within Sweden
- Coordinates: 56°33′N 13°43′E
- Country: Sweden
- Province: Småland
- County: Kronoberg County
- Municipality: Markaryd Municipality

Area
  - Total: 3.33 km^{2} (1.29 sq mi)

Population (31 December 2010)
  - Total: 2,066
  - Density: 621/km^{2} (1,610/sq mi)
- Time zone: UTC+1 (CET)
  - Summer (DST): UTC+2 (CEST)

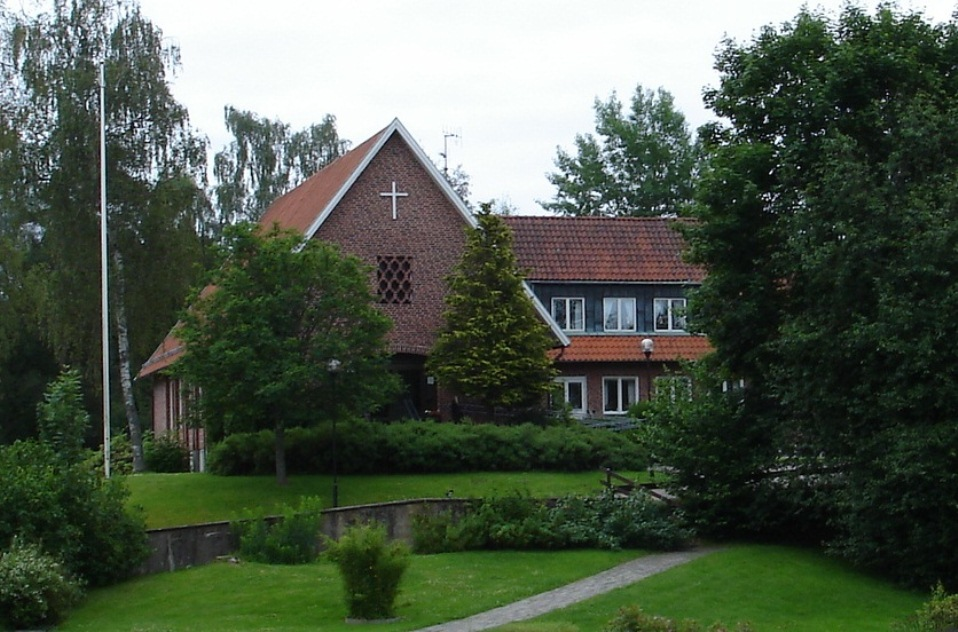
Saint Andreas Church in Strömsnäsbruk

Strömsnäsbruk is the second largest locality situated in Markaryd Municipality, Kronoberg County, Sweden with 2,066 inhabitants in 2010.

The settlement grew up after the opening of Skåne-Smålands Järnväg (railway) in 1887. A paper mill, Strömsnäs Bruk, was erected and was the main industry in Strömsnäsbruk until it was closed down in the 1970s. Strömsnäsbruk had a maximum population of 2,500 in the 1960s.
