= Valdemarsviks IF =

Swedish football club

- Full name: Valdemarsviks Idrottsförening
- Founded: 1919
- Ground: Grännäs IP; Valdemarsvik; Sweden
- Chairman: Sven Åke Karlström
- League: Division 4 Östergötland Östra
Home colours	Away colours

Valdemarsviks IF is a Swedish football club located in Valdemarsvik.

== Background ==
Valdemarsviks IF currently plays in Division 4 Östergötland Östra which is the sixth tier of Swedish football. They play their home matches at the Grännäs IP in Valdemarsvik.

The club is affiliated to Östergötlands Fotbollförbund.

== Season to season ==
In their most successful period Valdemarsviks IF competed in the following divisions:

Season	Level	Division	Section	Position	Movements
1968	Tier 4	Division 4	Östergötland Östra	2nd	
1969	Tier 4	Division 4	Östergötland Östra	10th	
1970	Tier 4	Division 4	Östergötland Östra	3rd	
1971	Tier 4	Division 4	Östergötland Östra	3rd	
1972	Tier 4	Division 4	Östergötland Östra	4th	
1973	Tier 4	Division 4	Östergötland Östra	8th	
1974	Tier 4	Division 4	Östergötland Östra	9th	
1975	Tier 4	Division 4	Östergötland Östra	8th	
1976	Tier 4	Division 4	Östergötland Östra	10th	
1977	Tier 4	Division 4	Östergötland Östra	11th	Relegated

In recent seasons Valdemarsviks IF have competed in the following divisions:

Season	Level	Division	Section	Position	Movements
2006*	Tier 7	Division 5	Östergötland Östra	11th	Relegated
2007	Tier 8	Division 6	Östergötland Östra	5th	
2008	Tier 8	Division 6	Östergötland Östra	2nd	Promoted
2009	Tier 7	Division 5	Östergötland Östra	1st	Promoted
2010	Tier 6	Division 4	Östergötland Östra	8th	
2011	Tier 6	Division 4	Östergötland Östra		

* League restructuring in 2006 resulted in a new division being created at Tier 3 and subsequent divisions dropping a level.
