= Fliseryd =

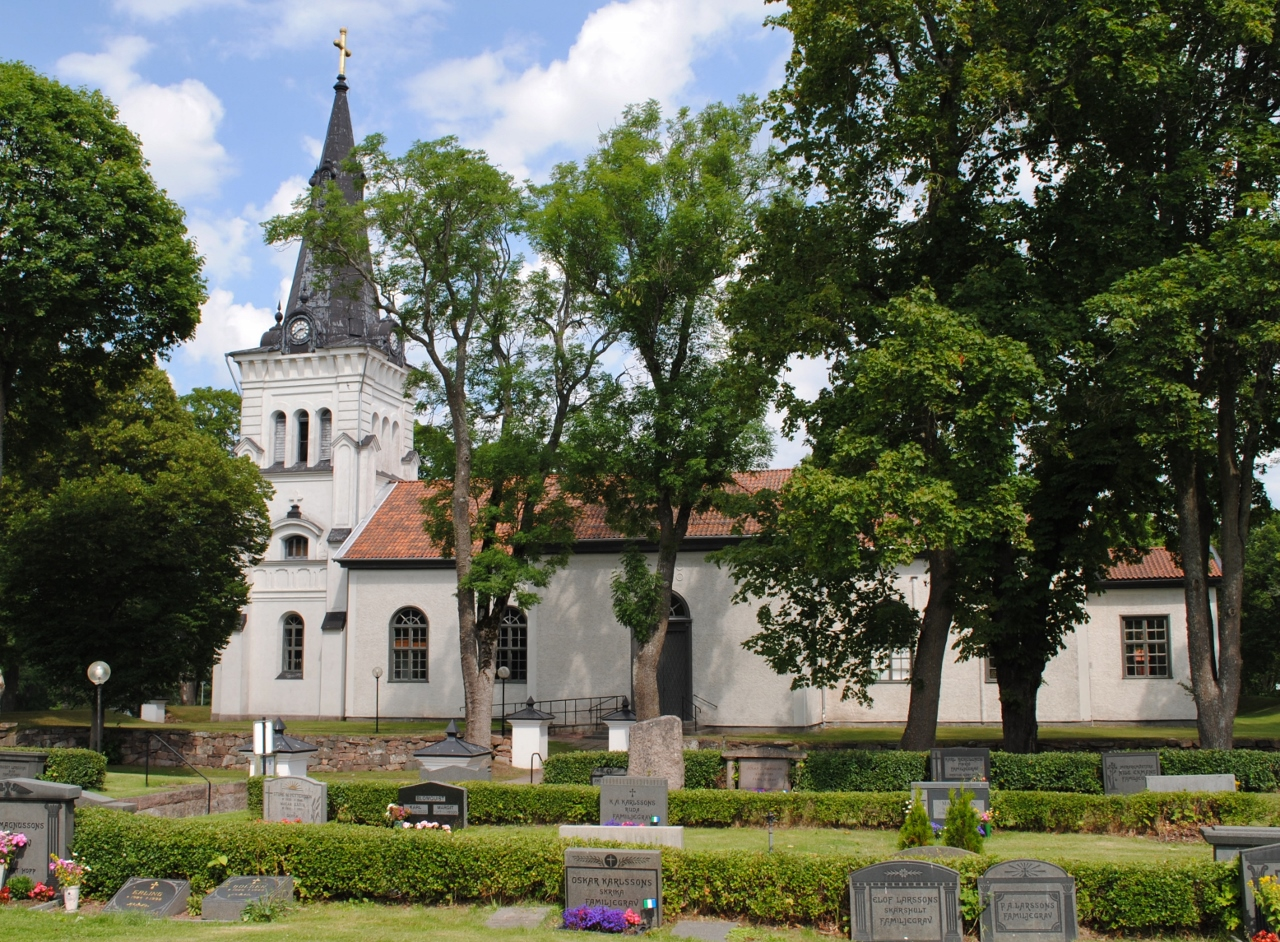

- Location within Kalmar Location within Sweden
- Coordinates: 57°07′38″N 16°15′38″E
- Country: Sweden
- Province: Småland
- County: Kalmar County
- Municipality: Mönsterås Municipality

Area
  - Total: 1.34 km^{2} (0.52 sq mi)

Population (31 December 2010)
  - Total: 677
  - Density: 506/km^{2} (1,310/sq mi)
- Time zone: UTC+1 (CET)
  - Summer (DST): UTC+2 (CEST)

Fliseryd is a locality situated in Mönsterås Municipality, Kalmar County, Sweden with 677 inhabitants as of 2010.
