= Oskarshamn Municipality =

Oskarshamn Municipality Oskarshamns kommun
- Municipality
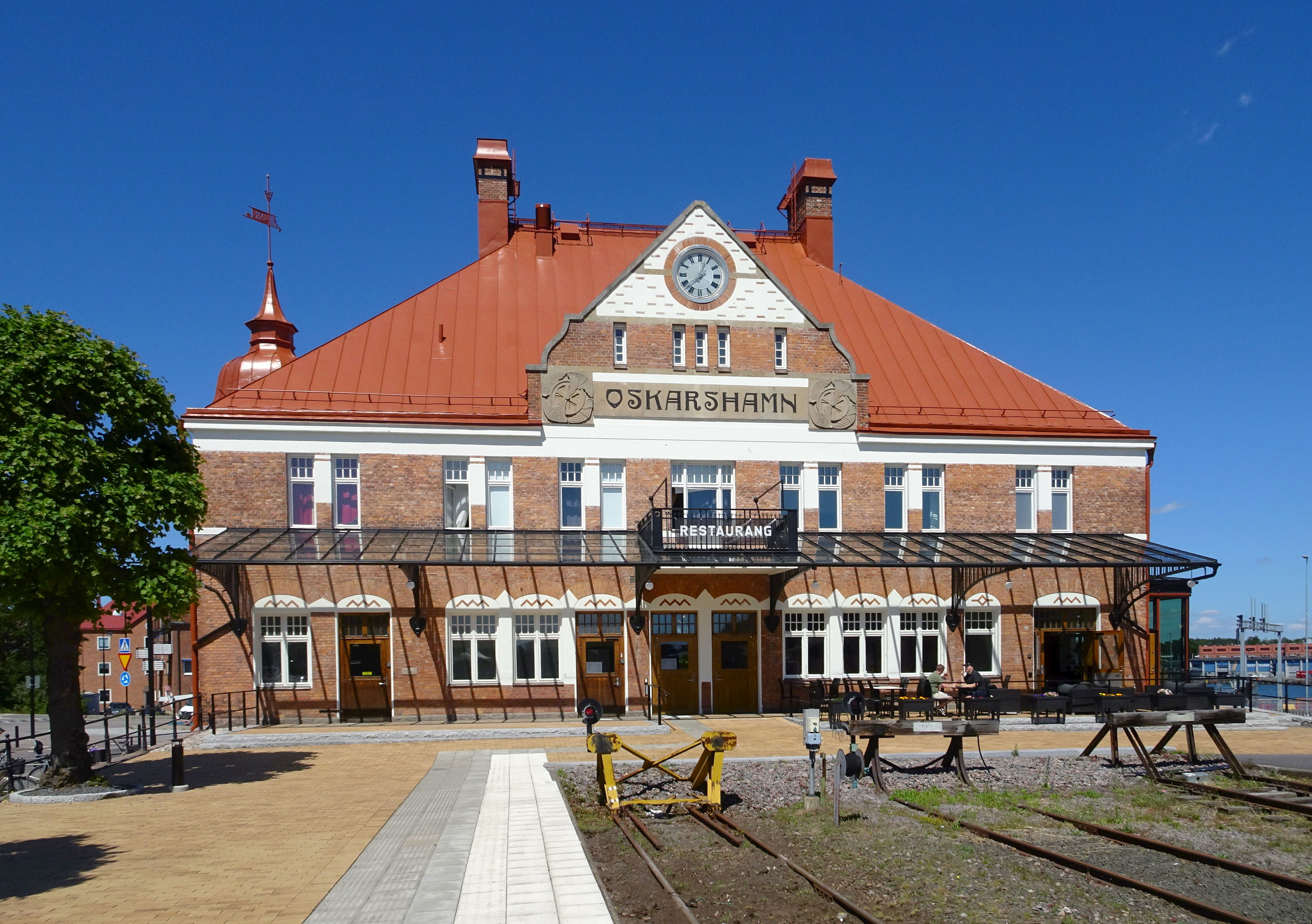
- Oskarshamn Railway Station

- Flag Coat of arms

- Coordinates: 57°16′N 16°27′E
- Country: Sweden
- County: Kalmar County
- Seat: Oskarshamn

Area
  - Total: 2,277.35 km^{2} (879.29 sq mi)
  - Land: 1,046.62 km^{2} (404.10 sq mi)
  - Water: 1,230.73 km^{2} (475.19 sq mi)
- Area as of 1 January 2014.

Population (30 June 2025)
  - Total: 26,909
  - Density: 25.710/km^{2} (66.590/sq mi)
- Time zone: UTC+1 (CET)
  - Summer (DST): UTC+2 (CEST)
- ISO 3166 code: SE
- Province: Småland
- Municipal code: 0882
- Website: www.oskarshamn.se

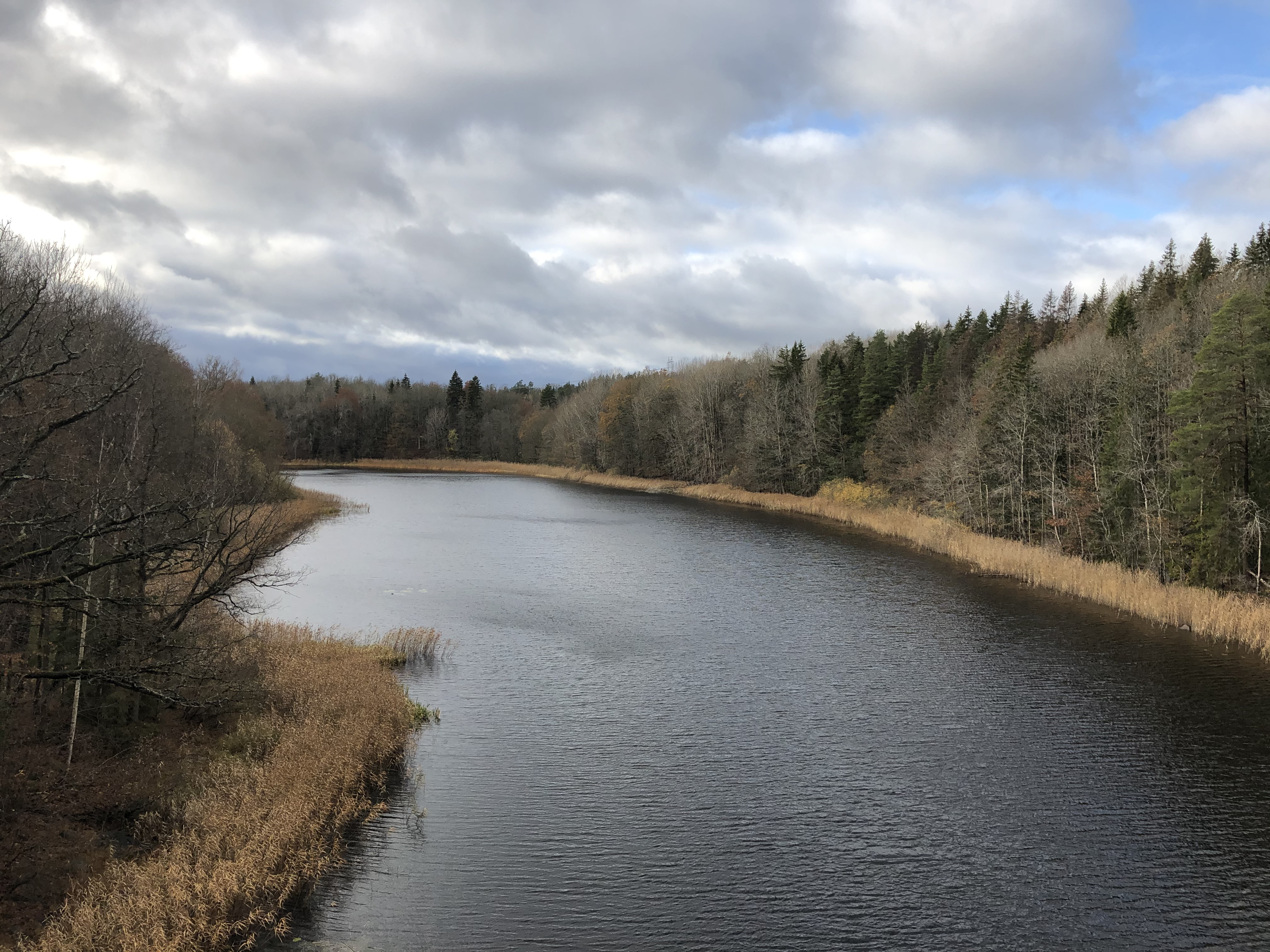
Maren

Oskarshamn Municipality (Swedish: Oskarshamns kommun) is a municipality in Kalmar County in south-eastern Sweden, where the city Oskarshamn is seat.

The amalgamations in the present municipality took place in 1967 when three rural municipalities joined the City of Oskarshamn, which was transformed into a municipality of unitary type in 1971.

In 1966 construction started on the first nuclear power plant, OKG, within the present municipality. Since then two more reactors have been built and the plant today produces about 10% of Sweden's electricity. In October 2020 the municipal council voted in favour of the building of Forsmark nuclear waste repository, with the final decision needing to be made by the Swedish government.

== Coat of arms ==
Oskarshamn was named after King Oscar I of Sweden. The top of the coat of arms show the insignia of the King. In the other fields there are symbols for shipping (the anchor), trade (the staff of Mercury) and wealth (the cornucopia).

Its current design stems from 1942, but it basically only differers from the old in the alignment of the symbols. The coat of arms was re-used for the new municipality after 1971 and the arms of Döderhult and Misterhult became obsolete.

== Localities ==
There are nine urban areas (also called localities, Swedish: tätorter) in Oskarshamn Municipality.

In the table the localities are listed according to the size of the population as of December 31, 2005. The municipal seat is in bold characters.

| # | Locality | Population |
|---|---|---|
| 1 | **Oskarshamn** | 17,143 |
| 2 | Påskallavik | 1,077 |
| 3 | Kristdala | 994 |
| 4 | Figeholm | 802 |
| 5 | Fårbo | 520 |
| 6 | Mysingsö | 398 |
| 7 | Emsfors 1) | 353 |
| 8 | Bockara | 351 |
| 9 | Saltvik | 285 |

1) A minor part of Emsfors is in Mönsterås Municipality

== Demographics ==
This is a demographic table based on Oskarshamn Municipality's electoral districts in the 2022 Swedish general election sourced from SVT's election platform, in turn taken from SCB official statistics.

In total there were 27,180 residents, including 20,862 Swedish citizens of voting age. 41.6 % voted for the left coalition and 57.2 % for the right coalition. Indicators are in percentage points except population totals and income.

| Location | Residents | Citizen adults | Left vote | Right vote | Employed | Swedish parents | Foreign heritage | Income SEK | Degree |
| Location | | | % | % | | | | | |
|---|---|---|---|---|---|---|---|---|---|
| Centrum | 1,845 | 1,530 | 44.1 | 55.0 | 75 | 74 | 26 | 22,129 | 30 |
| Döderhult-Bockara | 2,182 | 1,655 | 32.2 | 67.1 | 85 | 92 | 8 | 28,237 | 32 |
| Figeholm | 996 | 780 | 40.5 | 58.9 | 79 | 89 | 11 | 24,399 | 29 |
| Fårbo-Misterhult | 1,548 | 1,200 | 37.3 | 60.8 | 83 | 90 | 10 | 25,451 | 26 |
| Gröndal | 1,019 | 841 | 49.7 | 49.1 | 84 | 77 | 23 | 26,600 | 39 |
| Humlekärrshult | 1,421 | 1,006 | 38.6 | 60.4 | 80 | 80 | 20 | 28,445 | 38 |
| Kolberga-Mockebo | 1,923 | 1,450 | 35.5 | 63.9 | 91 | 92 | 8 | 32,316 | 51 |
| Kristdala-Bråbo-Ishult | 1,649 | 1,274 | 37.7 | 61.5 | 81 | 90 | 10 | 23,448 | 31 |
| Kristineberg V | 1,830 | 1,283 | 54.0 | 43.8 | 70 | 59 | 41 | 22,793 | 27 |
| Kristineberg Ö | 2,198 | 1,612 | 46.3 | 52.4 | 79 | 71 | 29 | 25,890 | 35 |
| Norrtorn | 1,701 | 1,343 | 42.1 | 55.9 | 82 | 75 | 25 | 26,715 | 34 |
| Orrängen-Syrenhagen | 1,215 | 971 | 41.1 | 58.2 | 84 | 81 | 19 | 26,406 | 36 |
| Påskallavik | 1,710 | 1,336 | 38.4 | 60.5 | 87 | 92 | 8 | 26,292 | 33 |
| Rödsle-Norrby | 1,589 | 1,217 | 37.6 | 61.9 | 89 | 93 | 7 | 28,619 | 38 |
| Solbacka-Åsa | 1,625 | 1,330 | 46.1 | 52.3 | 78 | 71 | 29 | 23,209 | 31 |
| Svalliden | 1,281 | 950 | 40.9 | 57.8 | 84 | 86 | 14 | 27,986 | 32 |
| Södertorn | 1,448 | 1,084 | 54.6 | 43.4 | 75 | 60 | 40 | 23,533 | 28 |
Source: SVT

== Politics ==
The Swedish Social Democratic Party has been governing the city and later the municipality since 1932, however not always forming an absolute majority. It usually builds a majority with the Left Party of Sweden. All parties that are represented in the Riksdag are also represented in the municipal assembly kommunfullmäktige.

== Media ==
Oskarshamn has two local newspapers: Oskarshamns-Tidningen (conservative) and Nyheterna (social democratic).

== Notability ==
The Blå Jungfrun is a small island outside the coast, between the mainland and the island of Öland, and is classified as a national park.

== See also ==
- Döderhultarn - Famous woodcarver from Oskarshamn
- Oskarshamn archipelago
