= Blomstermåla =

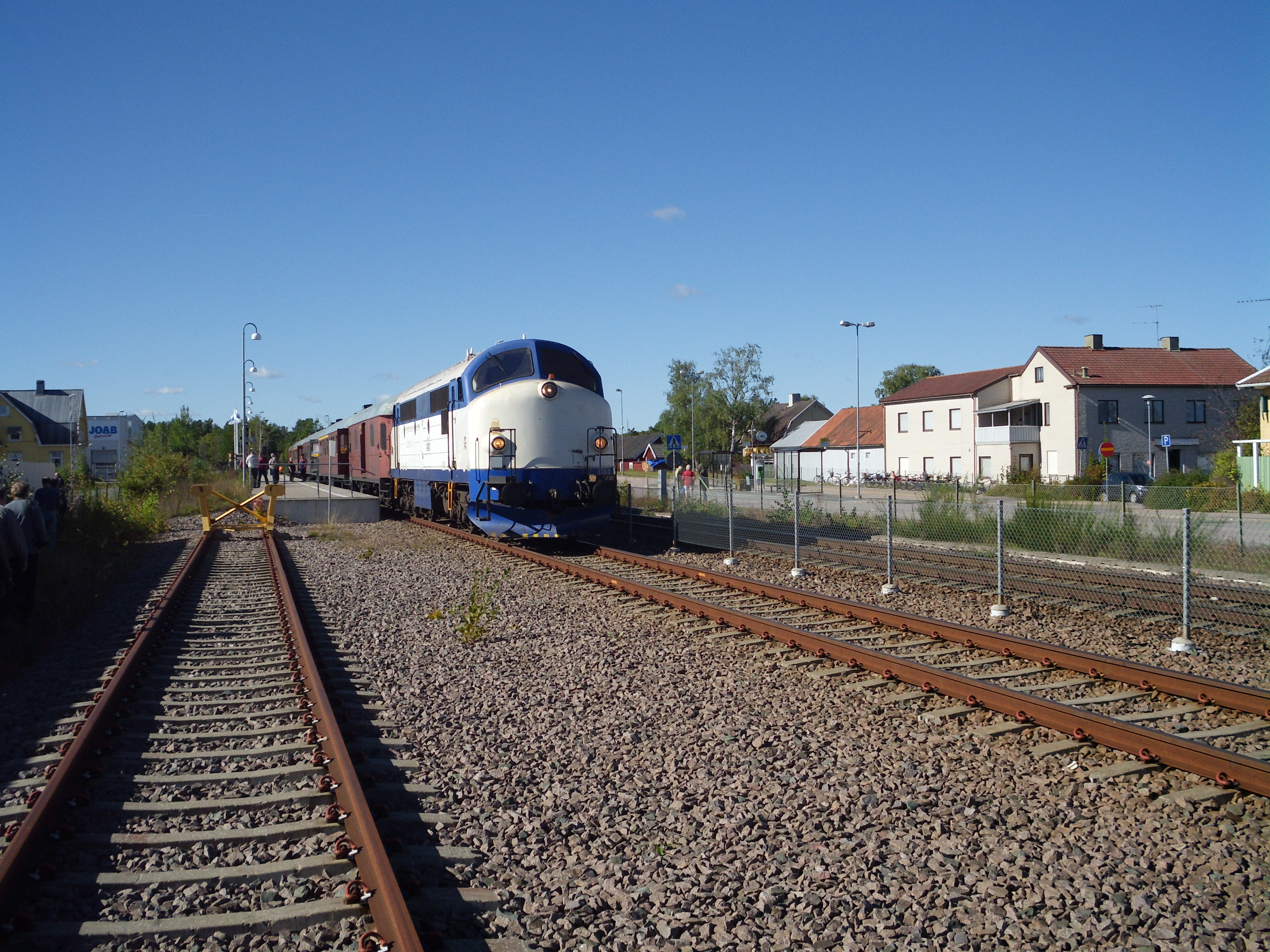
- Blomstermåla Train Station

- Location within Kalmar Location within Sweden
- Coordinates: 56°59′N 16°20′E
- Country: Sweden
- Province: Småland
- County: Kalmar County
- Municipality: Mönsterås Municipality

Area
  - Total: 2.53 km^{2} (0.98 sq mi)

Population (31 December 2010)
  - Total: 1,527
  - Density: 603/km^{2} (1,560/sq mi)
- Time zone: UTC+1 (CET)
  - Summer (DST): UTC+2 (CEST)

Blomstermåla (Swedish pronunciation: [blɔmstɛrˈmôːla]) is a locality situated in Mönsterås Municipality, Kalmar County, Sweden with 1,527 inhabitants in 2010.
