= Nibe Industrier =

Swedish heating, cooling and energy systems manufacturer

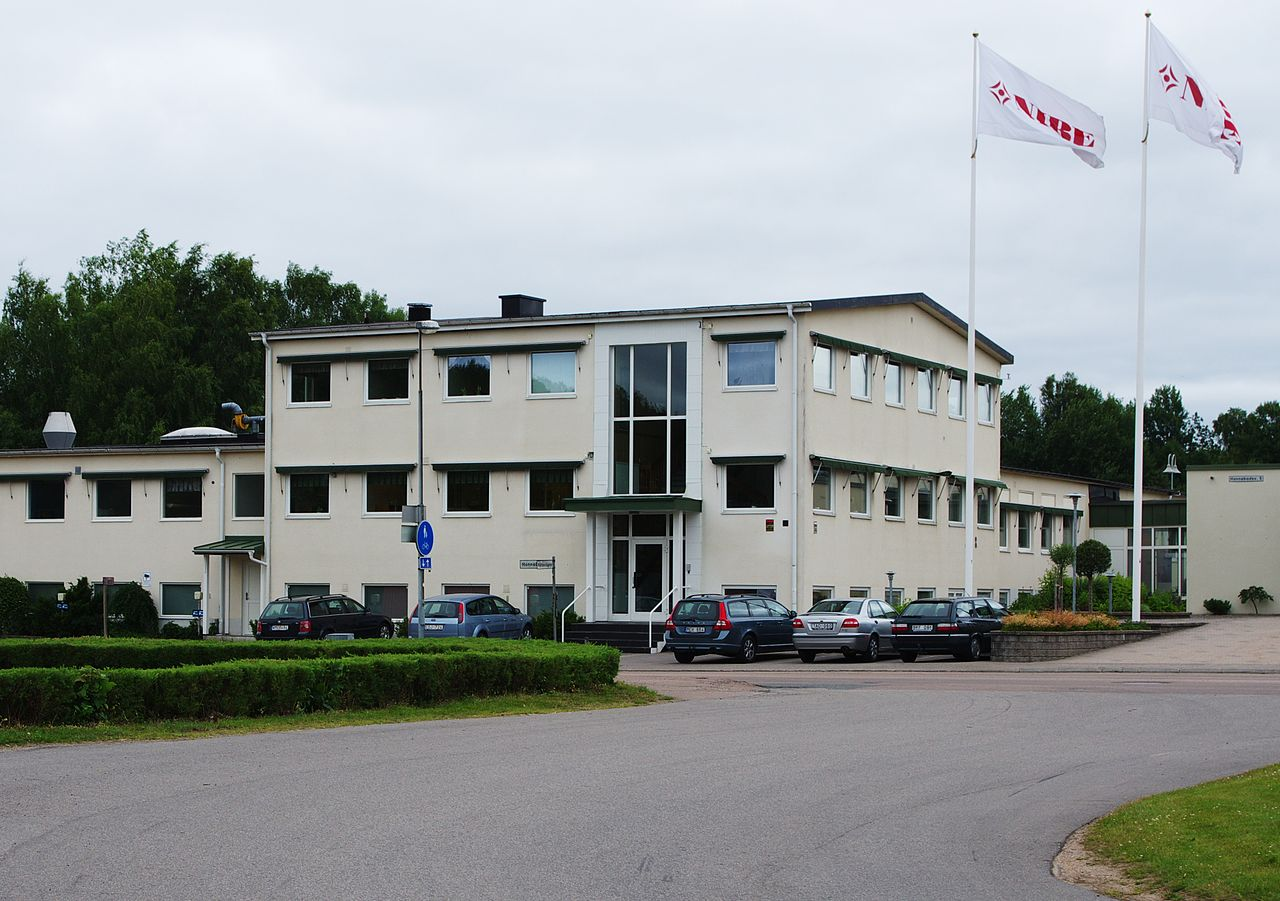
NIBEs headquarters in Markaryd

NIBE Industrier AB is a Swedish heating, cooling and energy systems manufacturer. They produce domestic stoves, air source heat pumps, ground source heat pumps, as well as other heating and climate control equipment.

The company head office is in Markaryd. Nibe Industrier AB was formed in 1989 and listed on the Stockholm stock exchange in 1997. NIBE Group (head office in Markaryd) consists of over 120 independent companies. They are grouped into three business areas: Climate Solutions, Stoves and Element.

== History ==
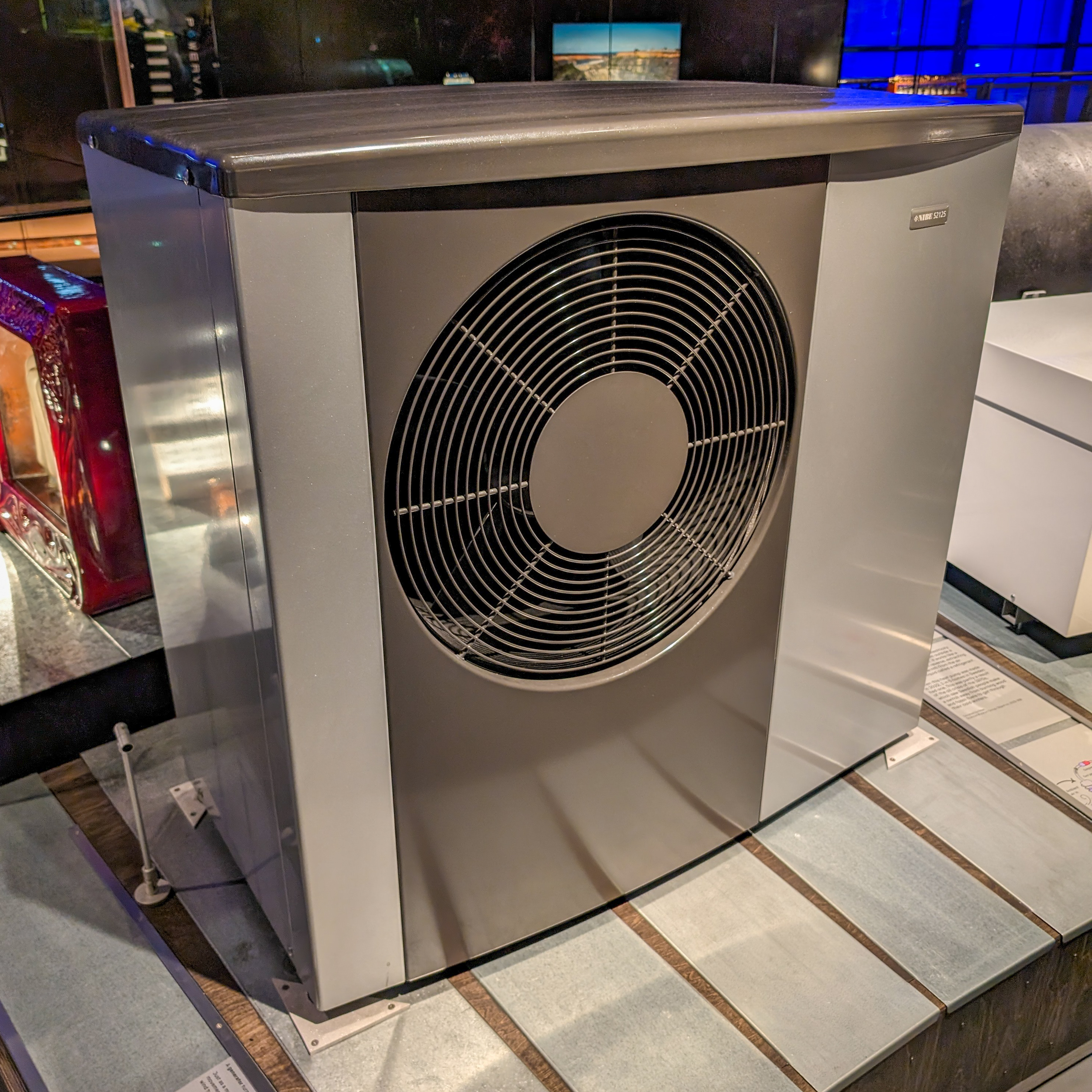
Air source heat pump in the Science Museum, London

The company was formed in 1952 by Nils Bernerup (formed from the first two letters of Bernerup's first and last name).

In 2009, the company signed an agreement with Mitsubishi Heavy Industries to produce heat pumps.

In 2016, it was areported that Nibe Industrier had acquired the US based WaterFurnace International, as well as a stock purchase agreement with LSB Industries, Inc. to acquire 100 per cent of LSB's Climate Control Group, Inc. (CCG).

In 2025, Nibe acquired 70 % of the shares of the Italian manufacturer of regulation Selmo based near Padova.
