= Stad (Sweden) =

Swedish term for urban centers

Stad (Swedish: 'town; city'; plural städer) is a Swedish term that historically was used for urban centers of various sizes. Since 1971, stad has no administrative or legal significance in Sweden.

== History ==
The status of towns in Sweden was formerly granted by a royal charter, comparable to the United Kingdom's status of borough or burgh before the 1970s or city status today. Unless given such town privileges, a municipality could not call itself stad. To receive the privileges, there were several requirements a municipality needed to fulfill, like being of a certain size, and to have certain facilities. The criteria varied over time as they were at the discretion of the Riksdag or the monarch, but they could include a permanent town council hall and a prison.

In the majority of cases, before a town received its charter, it would have previously been given the status of köping or "merchant town". Exceptions to this would be when a town was founded under Royal supervision, in which case it would often bear the name of the monarch, such as Karlskrona (named after king Karl XI of Sweden).

In the Late Middle Ages, c. 1450, Sweden (excluding Finland) had 41 chartered towns. By 1680 there were 83. The only town founded and chartered during the 18th century was Östersund (1786). In 1863 the first local government acts were implemented in Sweden. Of the around 2,500 municipalities that were created, 88 were chartered towns. The main difference between these and other municipalities was that a stad had its own jurisdiction, i.e. independent town courts. There were also laws on urban planning and building (Byggnadstadgan 1874), fire prevention (Brandstadgan 1874), public order (Ordningsstadgan 1868) and public health (Hälsovårdsstadgan 1874) which were compulsory applicable to towns. Prior to 1900, the two minor towns of Borgholm and Haparanda lost their courts, but retained the title of stad.

Of the new towns chartered between 1901 and 1951 (44, making the total number of towns 133), not a single one was given its own jurisdiction, but remained under what was called landsrätt ("rural jurisdiction").

=== 20th century reforms ===
In the middle of the 20th century many administrative reforms were carried out that continued to diminish the difference between rural and urban areas. Police forces and district courts, as well as taxation, were centralized under state agencies, making the administration uniform all over Sweden.

The amalgamations of municipalities reduced the number of local government units from a maximum of 2,532 in 1930 to less than 300 today. Consequently, by 1970 most municipalities contained both rural and urban areas. Since the urban and rural municipalities also with time got the same duties towards citizens, it became unnecessary to differentiate between towns and other municipalities, as all had the same powers. Since 1 January 1971, all municipalities are designated as kommun, regardless of their former status.

== Modern use ==
Most of the urban areas of Sweden which once were chartered towns are today still usually referred to as stad. The majority of them are also house the seat of their respective municipalities though the term is no longer an administrative term. In some municipalities there can be more than one former town, e.g. Eskilstuna and Torshälla in Eskilstuna Municipality, Kungälv and Marstrand in Kungälv Municipality, or Jönköping, Huskvarna and Gränna, which all three now are part of Jönköping Municipality. The town of Visby is the seat of Gotland Municipality, but is no political entity of its own. Some former towns have also grown together, forming one urban area.

A few municipalities which used to be towns still style themselves as stad, e.g. Stockholm, Gothenburg and Malmö. There are also municipalities with considerable rural areas that market themselves with the term.

Statistics Sweden defines the term stad as a locality with more than 10,000 inhabitants of which there are currently 127.

== Urban population ==
Largest urban areas in 1850:

- Stockholm (93,000 inhabitants)
- Gothenburg (26,000)
- Norrköping (17,000)
- Karlskrona (14,000)
- Malmö (13,000)

Largest urban areas in 1900:

- Stockholm (300,624)
- Gothenburg (130,609)
- Malmö (60,857)
- Norrköping (41,008)
- Gävle (29,522)
- Helsingborg (24,670)
- Karlskrona (23,955)
- Jönköping (23,143)
- Uppsala (22,855)
- Örebro (22,013)
- Lund (16,621)
- Borås (15,837)
- Halmstad (15,362)

== See also ==
- Municipalities of Sweden
- Urban areas in Sweden
