= Ålem =

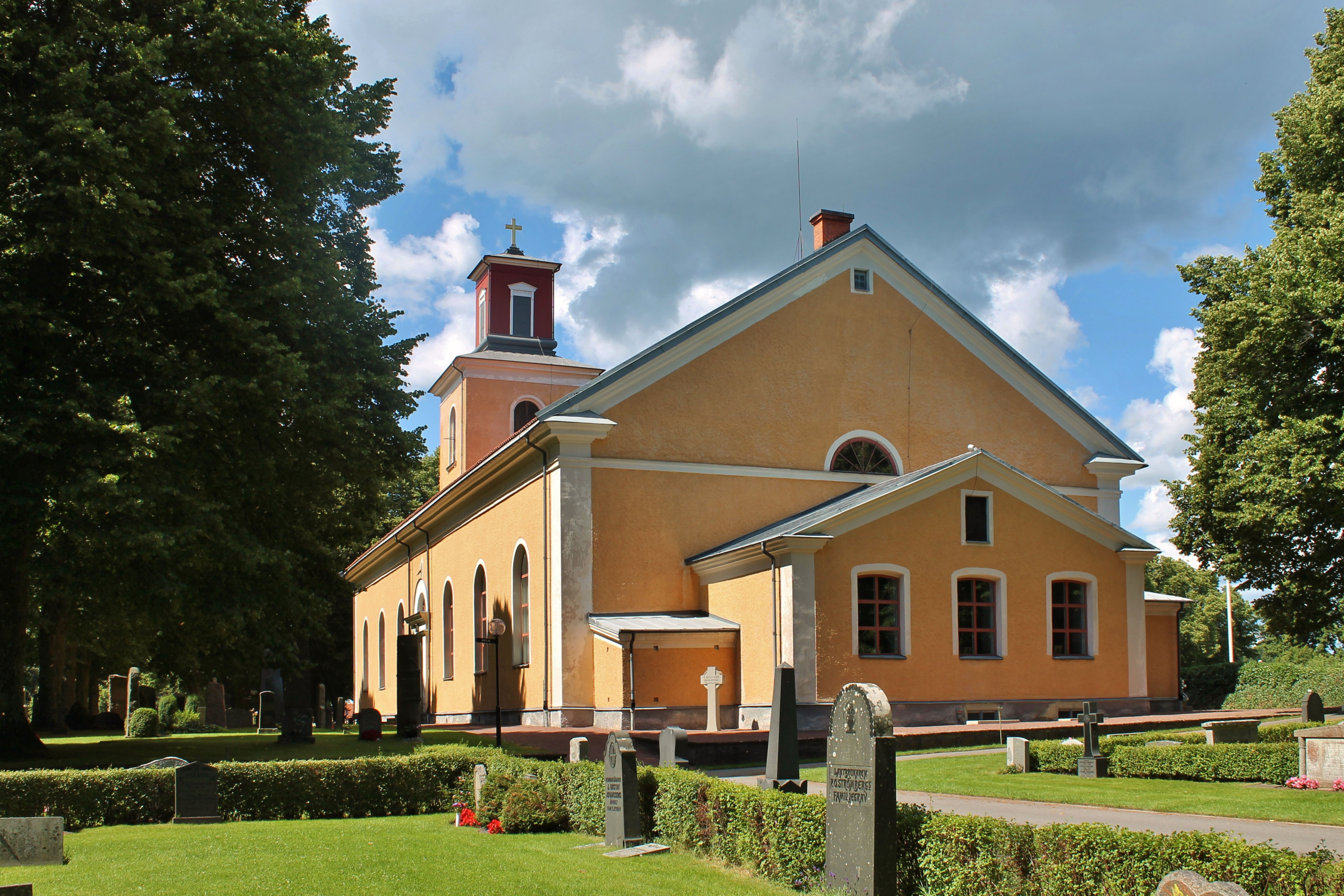

- Location within Kalmar Location within Sweden
- Coordinates: 56°57′N 16°23′E
- Country: Sweden
- Province: Småland
- County: Kalmar County
- Municipality: Mönsterås Municipality

Area
  - Total: 1.15 km^{2} (0.44 sq mi)

Population (31 December 2010)
  - Total: 803
  - Density: 696/km^{2} (1,800/sq mi)
- Time zone: UTC+1 (CET)
  - Summer (DST): UTC+2 (CEST)

Ålem (Swedish pronunciation: [ˈôːlɛm]) is a locality situated in Mönsterås Municipality, Kalmar County, Sweden with 803 inhabitants in 2010.
