= Markaryd =

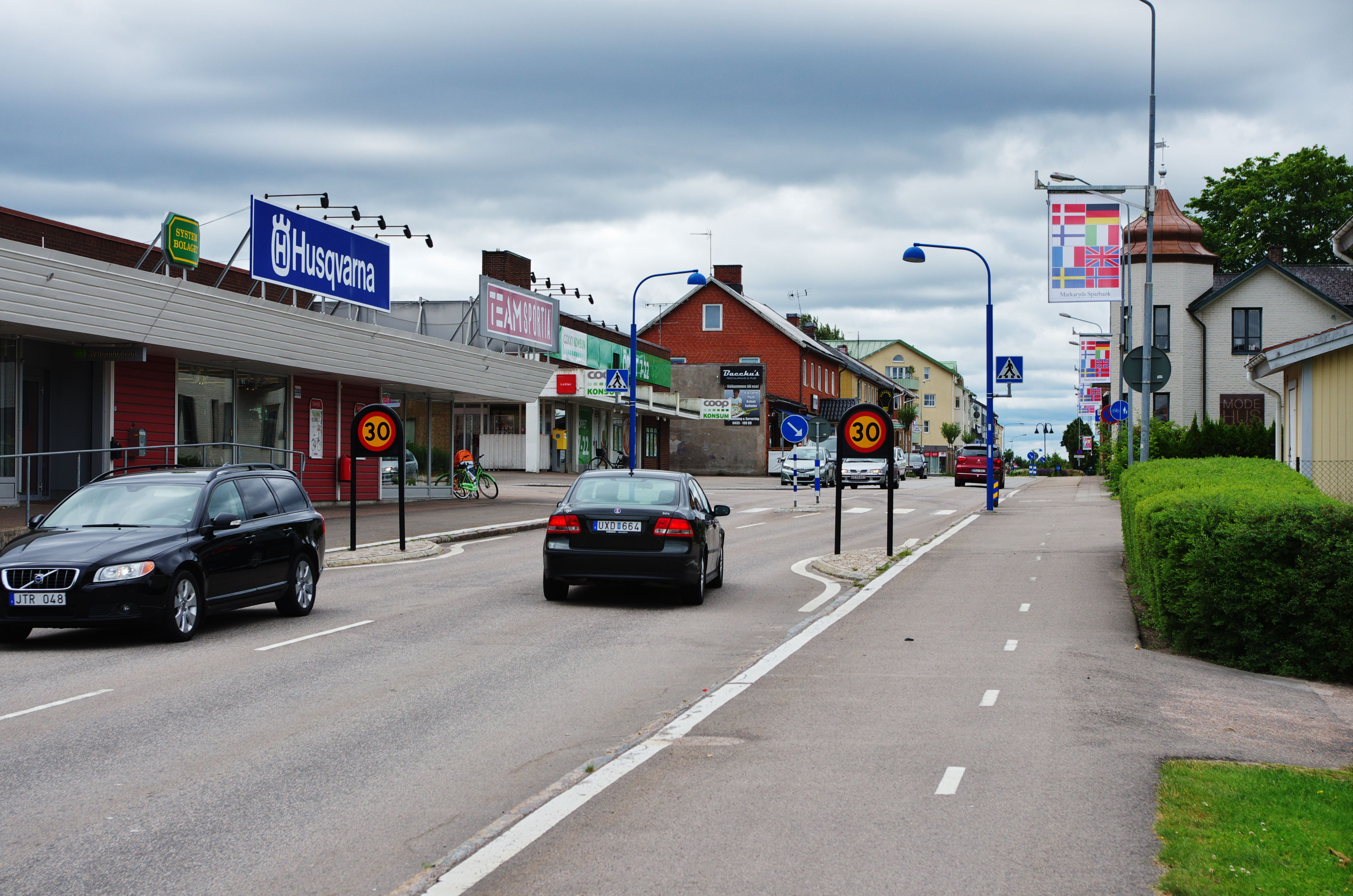
- Central Markaryd in July 2013

- Coat of arms

- Location within Kronoberg Location within Sweden
- Coordinates: 56°27′N 13°35′E
- Country: Sweden
- Province: Småland
- County: Kronoberg County
- Municipality: Markaryd Municipality

Area
  - Total: 4.90 km^{2} (1.89 sq mi)

Population (31 December 2010)
  - Total: 3,966
  - Density: 809/km^{2} (2,100/sq mi)
- Time zone: UTC+1 (CET)
  - Summer (DST): UTC+2 (CEST)

Markaryd is a locality and the seat of Markaryd Municipality, Kronoberg County, Sweden with 3,966 inhabitants in 2010.

== Economy ==
Nibe Industrier has its headquarters in the town.

== International relations ==
=== Twin towns — Sister cities ===
Markaryd is twinned with:

- Bytów, Poland
