= Mönsterås =

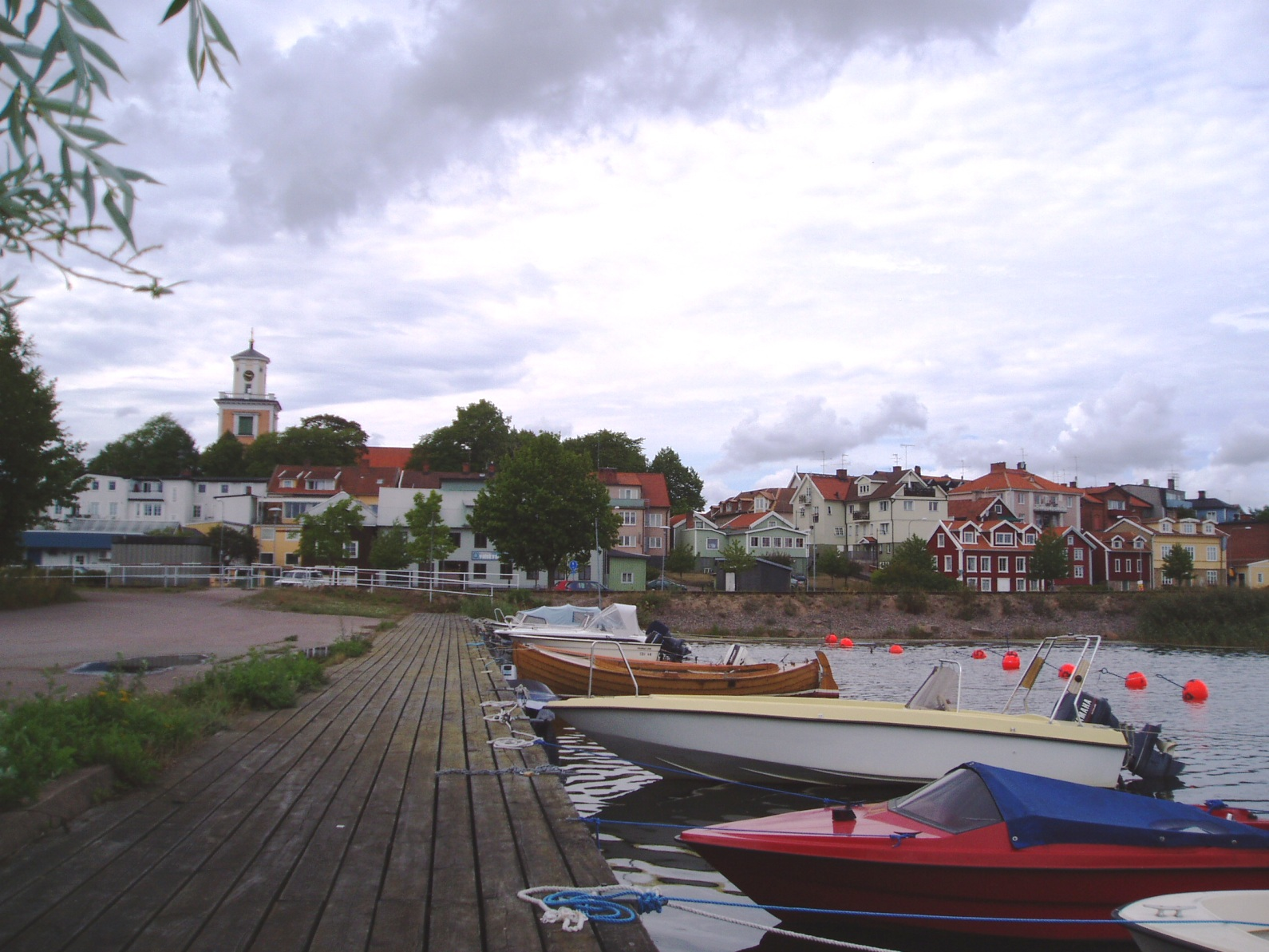
- Mönsterås

- Location within Kalmar Location within Sweden
- Coordinates: 57°02′N 16°27′E
- Country: Sweden
- Province: Småland
- County: Kalmar County
- Municipality: Mönsterås Municipality

Area
  - Total: 4.10 km^{2} (1.58 sq mi)

Population (2020)
  - Total: 5,186
  - Density: 1,154/km^{2} (2,990/sq mi)
- Time zone: UTC+1 (CET)
  - Summer (DST): UTC+2 (CEST)

Mönsterås (Swedish pronunciation: [mœnstɛrˈoːs]) is a locality and the seat of Mönsterås Municipality, Kalmar County, Sweden, with 6,352 inhabitants in 2012.

Mönsterås is associated with the Swedish poet Carl Boberg, particularly his 1885 writing of the lyrics for the eminent hymn "O Store Gud" (or "How Great Thou Art" by its common English title).

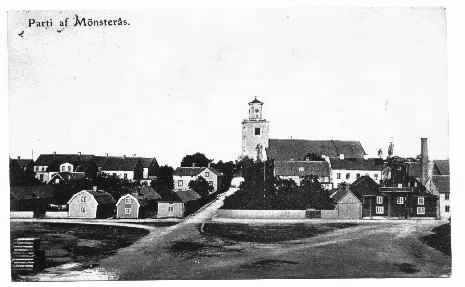
Postcard from around 1905 depicting the centre of Mönsterås
