= Valdemarsvik =

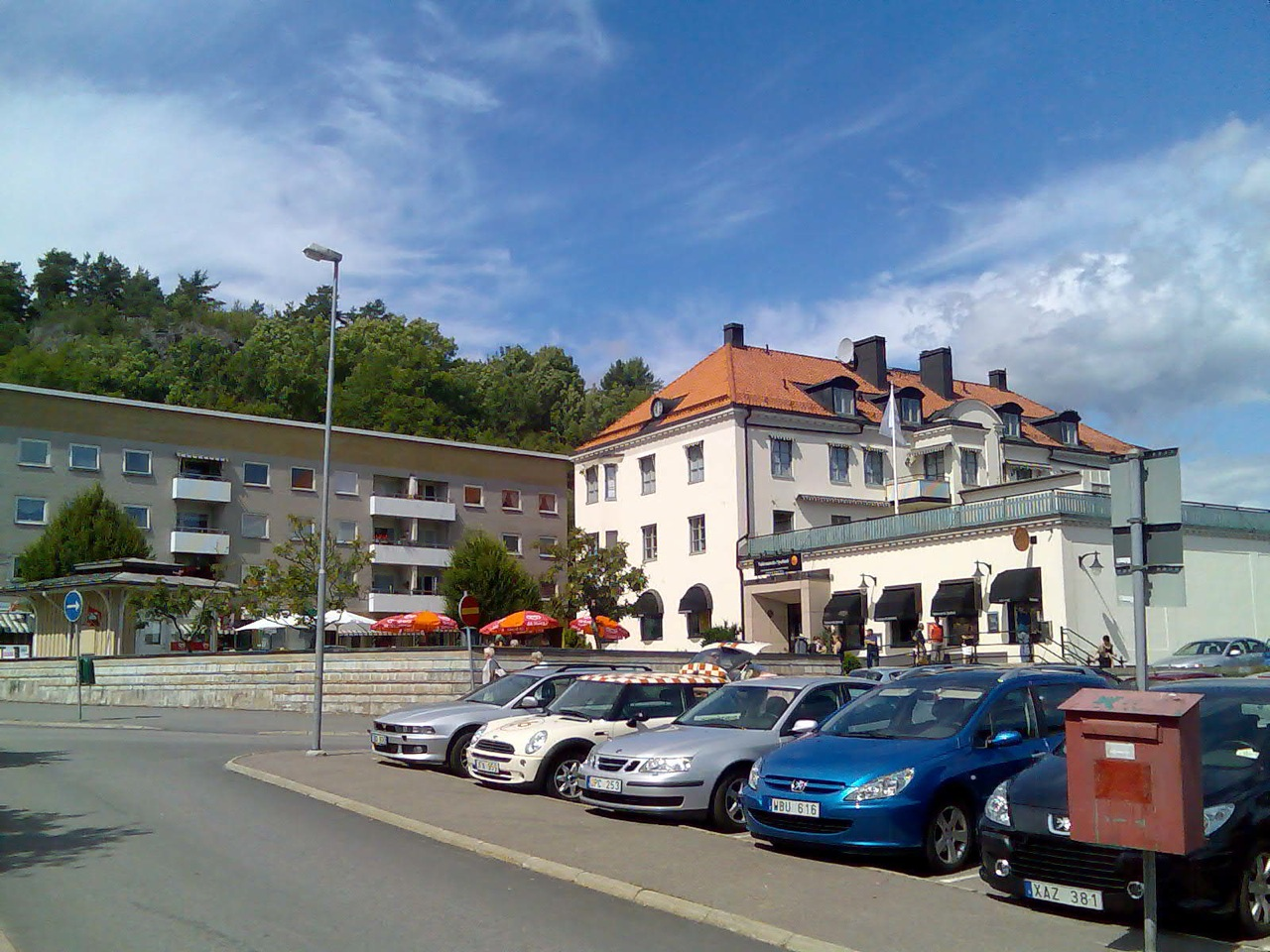

- Location within Östergötland Location within Sweden
- Coordinates: 58°12′N 16°36′E
- Country: Sweden
- Province: Östergötland and Småland
- County: Östergötland County
- Municipality: Valdemarsvik Municipality

Area
  - Total: 2.89 km^{2} (1.12 sq mi)

Population (31 December 2020)
  - Total: 2,751
  - Density: 952/km^{2} (2,470/sq mi)
- Time zone: UTC+1 (CET)
  - Summer (DST): UTC+2 (CEST)

Valdemarsvik is a locality, situated alongside the bay of Valdemarsviken which connects to the Baltic Sea. It is the seat of Valdemarsvik Municipality which is located in Östergötland County, Sweden. The coastal area is a popular summer destination, particularly with Swedish tourists.

== History ==
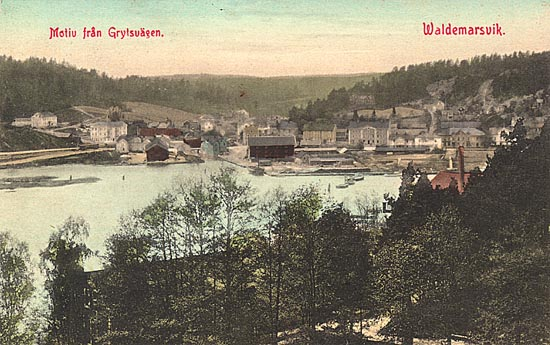
A 1913 postcard of Valdemarsvik

Valdemarsvik is surrounded by water. However, after the end of the last glacial period, it lay beneath the sea level. As a result of post-glacial rebound, the water withdrew as the land rose. The resulting appearance of fertile soil drew settlers in the Bronze Age, around 1500 BC.

The surrounding archipelago has had a bloody history: remains of shipwrecks at the bottom of the sea and Viking Age remnants witness of battles from that time. Industrialization occurred during the 1630s, when Valdemarsvik became a trade port for copper and leather. One of Sweden's largest tanneries was located in Valdemarsvik. The town's name was first mentioned in 1664.

== Tourism and entertainment ==
Sailing to the Tjust archipelago to swim and fish is a popular summertime activity. Boat excursions and jetski rentals are also available.

No one I know who has experienced Gryt's archipelago disagrees with me saying: It has been—and is—a blessing to experience this archipelago, this living porch, stretching out into the endless ocean.

— Henning Mankell, author and seasonal resident of the archipelago of Gryt

Other recreational activities include bicycle rentals, golf, cinemas, canoeing, and horse riding. There are museums in the locality that can be visited. The glass artist, sculptor and painter Milan Wobruba has a studio, where visitors have the opportunity to be involved in glass blowing and the manufacture of glass. An "October Market", held every 4 October, is both a market, with a range of goods to be sold, and a fair, featuring acrobats, cotton candy, live music and various amusement rides.

Many of Valdemarsvik's restaurants and cafés are open all year round; others are open during the tourist season. Also, each year there is exists a special "food competition". Dishes are to be made, the ingredients should, as far as possible, be locally produced and which a jury then assesses. The winning dish is then served at most restaurants in the municipality.

The football club Valdemarsviks IF is located in Valdemarsvik.
