= Påskallavik =

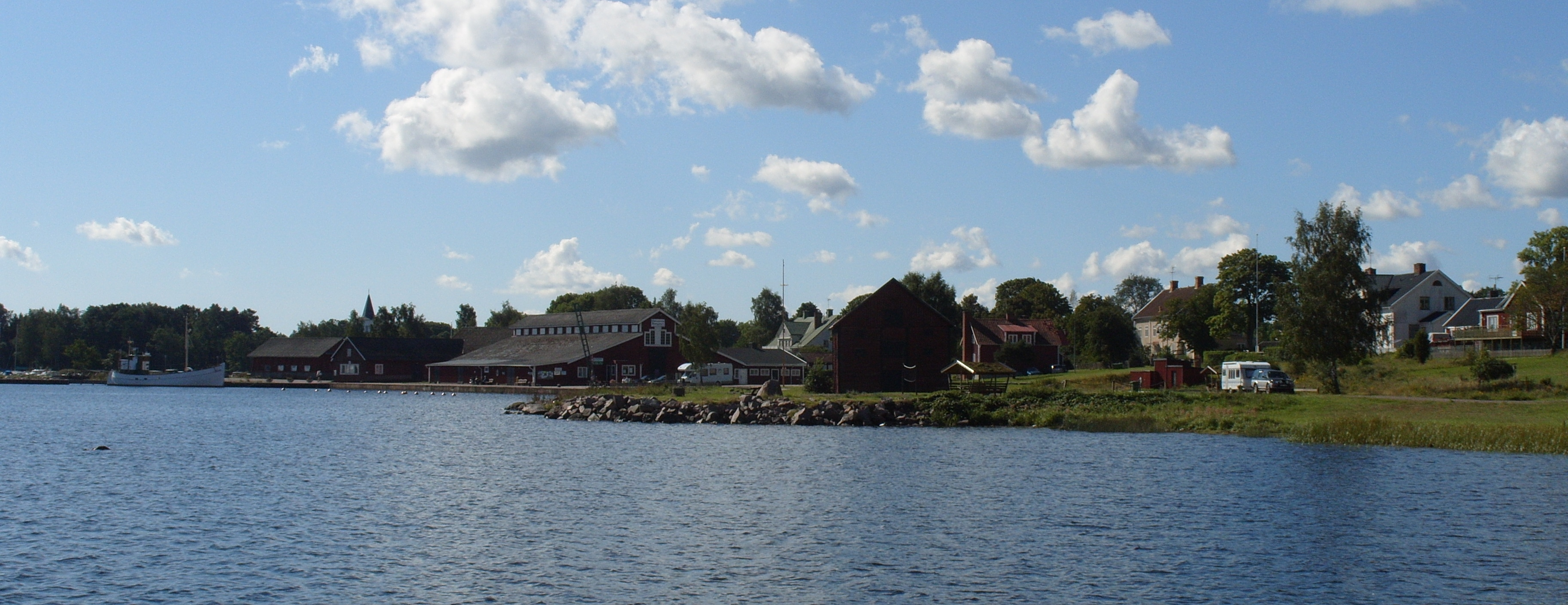

- Location within Kalmar Location within Sweden
- Coordinates: 57°10′N 16°17′E
- Country: Sweden
- Province: Småland
- County: Kalmar County
- Municipality: Oskarshamn Municipality

Area
  - Total: 1.12 km^{2} (0.43 sq mi)

Population (31 December 2010)
  - Total: 1,083
  - Density: 964/km^{2} (2,500/sq mi)
- Time zone: UTC+1 (CET)
  - Summer (DST): UTC+2 (CEST)

Påskallavik (Swedish pronunciation: [pɔskalaˈviːk]) is a locality situated in Oskarshamn Municipality, Kalmar County, Sweden with 1,083 inhabitants in 2010.
