= Figeholm =

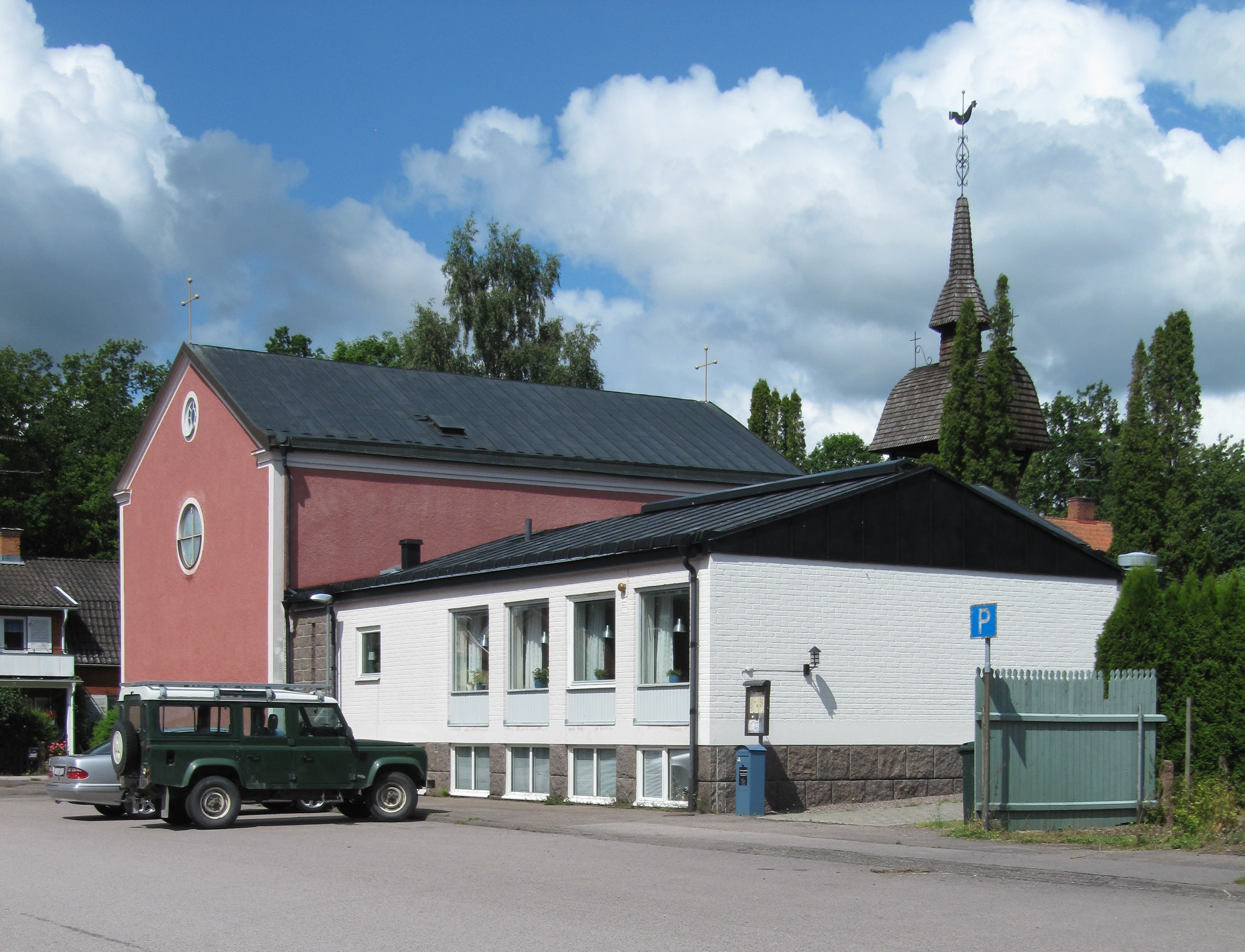

- Location within Kalmar Location within Sweden
- Coordinates: 57°22′N 16°33′E
- Country: Sweden
- Province: Småland
- County: Kalmar County
- Municipality: Oskarshamn Municipality

Area
  - Total: 0.85 km^{2} (0.33 sq mi)

Population (31 December 2010)
  - Total: 743
  - Density: 870/km^{2} (2,300/sq mi)
- Time zone: UTC+1 (CET)
  - Summer (DST): UTC+2 (CEST)

Figeholm is a locality situated in Oskarshamn Municipality, Kalmar County, Sweden with 743 inhabitants in 2010.
