= Mönsterås Municipality =

Mönsterås Municipality Mönsterås kommun
- Municipality
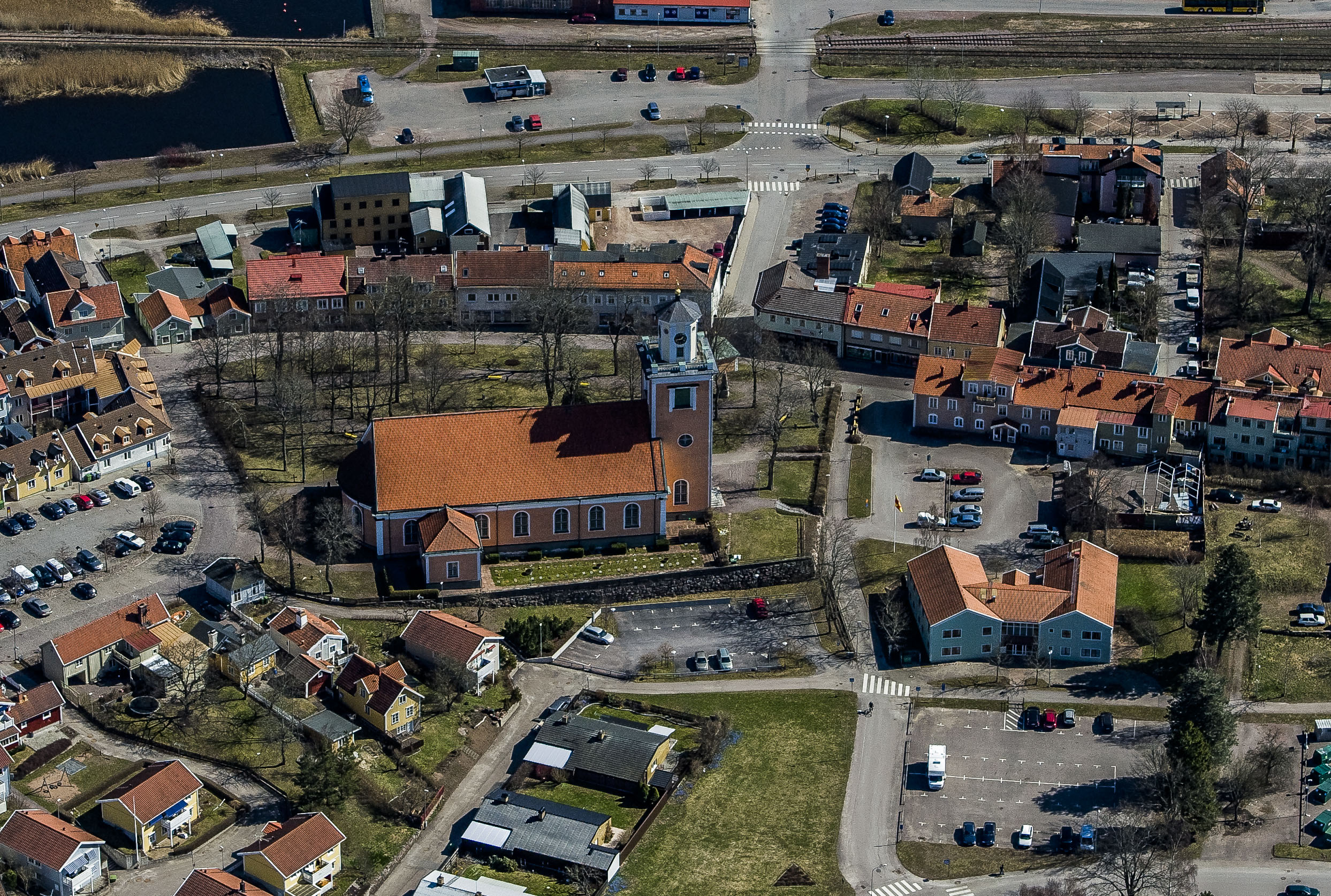

- Coat of arms

- Coordinates: 57°02′N 16°27′E
- Country: Sweden
- County: Kalmar County
- Seat: Mönsterås

Area
  - Total: 941.04 km^{2} (363.34 sq mi)
  - Land: 599.46 km^{2} (231.45 sq mi)
  - Water: 341.58 km^{2} (131.88 sq mi)
- Area as of 1 January 2014.

Population (30 June 2025)
  - Total: 13,053
  - Density: 21.775/km^{2} (56.396/sq mi)
- Time zone: UTC+1 (CET)
  - Summer (DST): UTC+2 (CEST)
- ISO 3166 code: SE
- Province: Småland
- Municipal code: 0861
- Website: www.monsteras.se

Mönsterås Municipality (Swedish: Mönsterås kommun) is a municipality in Kalmar County, south-eastern Sweden, with its seat located in the town Mönsterås.

Mönsterås was an original market town köping, which in 1952 was united with the rural municipality by the same name. By the local government reform of 1971 it became a municipality of unitary type and amalgamated with Fliseryd and Ålem in 1974.

The municipal arms show the ridge which the town centre with its church has been situated on since the medieval age. The cross symbolizes the Knights Hospitallers, a monastic order that was built in the town in the fifteenth century and had a large influence on its development. It is an etymological design showing the origin of the name of the municipality: Mönster comes from monastery while ås means ridge.

== Geography ==
The coastal line is signified by an archipelago with some 300 islands and islets, whereof two are nature reserves. On the island farthest from land, the lighthouse of Dämman was built in 1873; an automatic lighthouse has replaced its function, but the house itself is visited by tourists and conferences.

The geography of the rest is by some parts covered with forests, as the Småland province generally is. There is also some agricultural areas closer to the sea. There are two rivers flowing through the municipality towards to sea: Emån and Alsterån, that designate the wildlife and geography.

=== Localities ===
There are 5 urban areas (also called a Tätort or locality) in Mönsterås Municipality.

In the table the localities are listed according to the size of the population as of December 31, 2007. The municipal seat is in bold characters.

#	Locality	Population
1	**Mönsterås**	4,783
2	Blomstermåla	1,599
3	Timmernabben	1,425
4	Ålem	1015
5	Fliseryd	762

== Demographics ==
This is a demographic table based on Mönsterås Municipality's electoral districts in the 2022 Swedish general election sourced from SVT's election platform, in turn taken from SCB official statistics.

In total there were 13,242 residents, including 10,143 Swedish citizens of voting age. 43.6% voted for the left coalition and 55.2% for the right coalition. Indicators are in percentage points except population totals and income.

Location	Residents	Citizen adults	Left vote	Right vote	Employed	Swedish parents	Foreign heritage	Income SEK	Degree
Location			%	%					
Blomstermåla	1,930	1,379	42.6	56.4	76	81	19	22,956	23
Fliseryd	1,443	996	34.5	64.4	81	83	17	24,737	22
Mönsterås C-N	1,200	836	49.2	49.4	66	63	37	19,733	27
Mönsterås C-S	1,472	1,197	54.4	44.0	70	76	24	19,921	27
Mönsterås Ljungnäs	1,314	1,086	42.8	56.4	86	92	8	27,951	37
Mönsterås N	1,428	1,131	39.3	59.9	84	93	7	27,609	34
Mönsterås S	1,271	972	49.7	48.4	81	78	22	23,957	31
Timmernabben	1,476	1,175	42.7	56.8	87	92	8	27,009	38
Ålem	1,708	1,371	39.8	58.6	82	90	10	24,053	33
Source: SVT
