= Results of the 1968 Swedish general election =

Sweden held a general election on 15 September 1968, to elect the members of the Second chamber of the Riksdag. This was to be the final bicameral Riksdag elected. As of 2020, this was the final time a party has held an outright majority in the Riksdag after the Social Democrats won 125 out of the 233 seats.

== National results ==
Party	Votes	%	Seats	+/–
Swedish Social Democratic Party	2,420,277	50.12	125	+12
Centre Party	757,215	15.68	39	+3
People's Party	688,456	14.26	34	–9
Right Party	621,031	12.86	32	–1
Left Party Communists	145,172	3.01	3	–5
Civic Unity (Note: Joint list of the three right-wing parties in Malmö.)	82,082	1.70	–	–
Christian Democratic Unity	72,377	1.50	0	0
Middle Parties (Note: Coalition of the Centre Party and People's Party that contested some constituencies.)	41,307	0.86	–	–
Other parties	1,462	0.03	0	0
Total	4,829,379	100.00	233	0
Valid votes	4,829,379	99.33		
Invalid/blank votes	32,522	0.67		
Total votes	4,861,901	100.00		
Registered voters/turnout	5,445,333	89.29		
Source: Nohlen & Stöver

== Regional results ==
=== Percentage share ===
Location	Share	Votes	S	C	FP	H	VPK	C/F/H	KDS	Other	Left	Right
Götaland	47.9	2,315,679	47.4	16.5	13.8	13.4	2.0	5.3	1.5	0.0	49.4	49.0
Svealand	37.0	1,786,378	51.5	13.4	16.3	14.0	3.4	0.0	1.3	0.0	54.9	43.7
Norrland	15.1	727,322	55.2	18.7	10.5	8.3	5.1	0.0	2.0	0.0	60.4	37.6
Total	100.0	4,829,379	50.1	15.7	14.3	12.9	3.0	2.6	1.5	0.0	53.1	45.3
Source: SCB

=== By votes ===
Location	Share	Votes	S	C	FP	H	VPK	C/F/H	KDS	Other	Left	Right
Götaland	47.9	2,315,679	1,098,372	381,855	320,417	309,887	46,730	123,389	34,153	876	1,145,102	1,135,548
Svealand	37.0	1,786,378	920,061	239,505	291,455	250,462	61,079		23,348	468	981,140	781,422
Norrland	15.1	727,322	401,844	135,855	76,584	60,682	37,363		14,876	118	439,207	273,121
Total	100.0	4,829,379	2,420,277	757,215	688,456	621,031	145,172	123,389	72,377	1,462	2,565,449	2,190,091
Source: SCB

== Constituency results ==
The results of the various constituency coalitions between the centre-right parties have all been listed under "C/F/H".

=== Percentage share ===
Location	Land	Turnout	Share	Votes	S	C	FP	H	VPK	C/F/H	KDS	Other	Left	Right	Margin
Location		%	%		%	%	%	%	%	%	%	%	%	%	
Blekinge	G	89.2	1.9	92,666	54.7	14.7	11.0	16.1	2.1	0.0	1.4	0.0	56.9	41.7	14,059
Bohuslän	G	88.3	2.9	141,544	43.5	14.9	23.7	14.7	2.0	0.0	1.1	0.0	45.5	53.4	11,190
Gothenburg	G	86.4	5.6	270,614	46.5	4.6	30.8	12.0	5.4	0.0	0.7	0.0	51.9	47.4	12,085
Gotland	G	89.6	0.7	32,662	40.2	0.0	0.0	13.6	0.0	45.6	0.5	0.0	40.2	59.2	6,181
Gävleborg	N	88.0	3.8	181,251	57.0	20.6	9.5	6.5	5.4	0.0	1.1	0.0	62.4	36.5	46,999
Halland	G	90.4	2.4	115,797	41.1	29.9	12.5	13.9	1.3	0.0	0.7	0.5	42.4	56.3	16,120
Jämtland	N	87.9	1.7	80,036	53.8	20.8	11.0	11.0	1.8	0.0	1.5	0.0	55.6	42.8	10,231
Jönköping	G	91.2	3.9	186,184	43.0	21.5	13.5	16.7	1.4	0.0	3.9	0.0	44.3	51.7	13,780
Kalmar	G	89.3	3.1	148,058	48.6	22.5	8.7	16.5	2.0	0.0	1.8	0.0	50.6	47.7	4,331
Kopparberg	S	87.9	3.5	170,382	53.5	24.0	10.3	7.6	3.0	0.0	1.6	0.0	56.4	41.9	24,674
Kristianstad	G	89.2	3.4	164,954	46.0	21.7	13.0	17.1	0.8	0.0	1.4	0.0	46.8	51.7	8,068
Kronoberg	G	89.1	2.1	102,843	43.3	27.2	9.0	16.6	2.4	0.0	1.4	0.0	45.7	52.9	7,365
Malmö area	G	91.4	5.5	263,678	56.3	0.0	0.0	0.0	1.8	41.1	0.8	0.0	58.1	41.1	44,610
Malmöhus	G	91.4	3.5	167,646	50.1	23.1	11.0	15.0	0.3	0.0	0.6	0.0	50.4	49.0	2,330
Norrbotten	N	87.3	3.1	147,532	57.8	12.4	8.1	8.9	10.8	0.0	2.0	0.0	68.6	29.4	57,756
Skaraborg	G	89.6	3.3	157,577	39.7	25.9	14.8	16.2	1.3	0.0	2.1	0.0	41.0	56.9	25,029
Stockholm	S	87.4	10.2	492,100	47.8	6.5	19.9	19.6	4.9	0.0	1.2	0.1	52.7	46.0	32,980
Stockholm County	S	90.2	7.5	362,977	47.2	11.6	19.2	17.6	3.3	0.0	1.0	0.0	50.5	48.4	7,678
Södermanland	S	91.2	3.1	147,344	56.8	14.9	15.1	10.0	1.7	0.0	1.5	0.0	58.5	40.0	27,121
Uppsala	S	89.1	2.4	116,607	50.8	17.0	15.8	12.6	1.9	0.0	1.9	0.0	52.7	45.4	8,537
Värmland	S	90.1	3.8	182,064	55.2	18.2	10.8	11.5	3.4	0.0	0.9	0.0	58.6	40.5	32,921
Västerbotten	N	89.0	3.0	142,696	49.3	20.0	16.5	9.5	1.5	0.0	3.2	0.0	50.8	45.9	7,010
Västernorrland	N	90.1	3.6	175,807	56.8	20.0	8.6	7.7	4.6	0.0	2.4	0.0	61.4	36.3	44,090
Västmanland	S	89.1	3.0	145,522	58.2	15.4	13.8	8.4	2.9	0.0	1.3	0.0	61.0	37.7	33,974
Älvsborg N	G	88.8	2.7	128,385	45.7	20.5	18.5	11.8	1.6	0.0	1.9	0.0	47.3	50.8	4,530
Älvsborg S	G	91.5	2.3	111,621	43.6	20.4	12.1	21.4	1.8	0.0	0.9	0.0	45.3	53.8	9,454
Örebro	S	89.3	3.5	169,382	55.8	15.9	15.1	8.6	2.7	0.0	1.9	0.0	58.4	39.6	31,833
Östergötland	G	90.4	4.8	231,450	54.0	14.9	13.5	13.3	2.2	0.0	2.3	0.0	56.2	41.6	33,856
Total		89.3	100.0	4,829,379	50.1	15.7	14.3	12.9	3.0	2.6	1.5	0.0	53.1	45.3	375,358
Source: SCB

=== By votes ===
The Left Party Communists did not participate in Gotland County, whereas various centre-right coalitions participated in Gotland and in the Malmö area. This resulted in zero or nearly no votes in some cases.

Location	Land	Turnout	Share	Votes	S	C	FP	H	VPK	C/F/H	KDS	Other	Left	Right	Margin
Location		%	%												
Blekinge	G	89.2	1.9	92,666	50,709	13,594	10,167	14,880	1,991	0	1,309	16	52,700	38,641	14,059
Bohuslän	G	88.3	2.9	141,544	61,510	21,107	33,599	20,861	2,867	0	1,586	14	64,377	75,567	11,190
Gothenburg	G	86.4	5.6	270,614	125,718	12,535	83,270	32,442	14,614	0	2,016	19	140,332	128,247	12,085
Gotland	G	89.6	0.7	32,662	13,145	1	0	4,433	0	14,892	179	12	13,145	19,326	6,181
Gävleborg	N	88.0	3.8	181,251	103,298	37,258	17,145	11,696	9,800	0	2,015	39	113,098	66,099	46,999
Halland	G	90.4	2.4	115,797	47,582	34,635	14,495	16,093	1,521	0	855	616	49,103	65,223	16,120
Jämtland	N	87.9	1.7	80,036	43,058	16,668	8,815	8,802	1,458	0	1,226	9	44,516	34,285	10,231
Jönköping	G	91.2	3.9	186,184	80,011	40,063	25,153	31,131	2,556	0	7,262	8	82,567	96,347	13,780
Kalmar	G	89.3	3.1	148,058	71,892	33,271	12,838	24,446	2,994	0	2,592	25	74,886	70,555	4,331
Kopparberg	S	87.9	3.5	170,382	91,078	40,955	17,484	13,018	5,053	0	2,791	3	96,131	71,457	24,674
Kristianstad	G	89.2	3.4	164,954	75,907	35,720	21,416	28,186	1,347	0	2,353	25	77,254	85,322	8,068
Kronoberg	G	89.1	2.1	102,843	44,561	27,997	9,289	17,103	2,463	0	1,427	3	47,024	54,389	7,365
Malmö area	G	91.4	5.5	263,678	148,467	1	3	7	4,644	108,490	1,988	78	153,111	108,501	44,610
Malmöhus	G	91.4	3.5	167,646	84,007	38,649	18,447	25,071	490	0	957	25	84,497	82,167	2,330
Norrbotten	N	87.3	3.1	147,532	85,257	18,285	12,021	13,119	15,924	0	2,889	37	101,181	43,425	57,756
Skaraborg	G	89.6	3.3	157,577	62,533	40,764	23,370	25,514	2,086	0	3,304	6	64,619	89,648	25,029
Stockholm	S	87.4	10.2	492,100	235,279	32,083	98,096	96,379	24,259	0	5,726	278	259,538	226,558	32,980
Stockholm County	S	90.2	7.5	362,977	171,306	42,216	69,816	63,711	12,115	0	3,719	94	183,421	175,743	7,678
Södermanland	S	91.2	3.1	147,344	83,671	21,975	22,254	14,777	2,456	0	2,197	14	86,127	59,006	27,121
Uppsala	S	89.1	2.4	116,607	59,192	19,809	18,387	14,724	2,265	0	2,201	29	61,457	52,920	8,537
Värmland	S	90.1	3.8	182,064	100,440	33,066	19,711	20,966	6,224	0	1,622	35	106,664	73,743	32,921
Västerbotten	N	89.0	3.0	142,696	70,370	28,479	23,483	13,576	2,178	0	4,590	20	72,548	65,538	7,010
Västernorrland	N	90.1	3.6	175,807	99,861	35,165	15,120	13,489	8,003	0	4,156	13	107,864	63,774	44,090
Västmanland	S	89.1	3.0	145,522	84,627	22,463	20,132	12,246	4,188	0	1,858	8	88,815	54,841	33,974
Älvsborg N	G	88.8	2.7	128,385	58,697	26,343	23,765	15,156	2,037	0	2,385	2	60,734	65,264	4,530
Älvsborg S	G	91.5	2.3	111,621	48,637	22,735	13,453	23,869	1,966	0	955	6	50,603	60,057	9,454
Örebro	S	89.3	3.5	169,382	94,468	26,938	25,575	14,641	4,519	0	3,234	7	98,987	67,154	31,833
Östergötland	G	90.4	4.8	231,450	124,996	34,440	31,152	30,695	5,154	7	4,985	21	130,150	96,294	33,856
Total		89.3	100.0	4,829,379	2,420,277	757,215	688,456	621,031	145,172	123,389	72,377	1,462	2,565,449	2,190,091	375,358
Source: SCB

== Results by municipality ==
1968 was the penultimate election where the postal votes were counted separately from the polling station votes in one unified count across municipalities. The exception to these results are those where the whole constituency was one municipality - namely Gothenburg, Gotland and Stockholm where all postal votes were automatically denoted as part of said municipalities.

Only parties or constellations that got votes in any given constituency are listed.

=== Blekinge ===
Location	Turnout	Share	Votes	S	C	FP	H	VPK	KDS	Other	Left	Right
Fridlevstad	86.7	3.3	3,067	41.4	34.0	5.7	15.8	1.4	1.7	0.0	42.8	55.5
Gammalstorp	91.4	1.7	1,616	47.5	22.0	9.9	18.9	0.7	1.0	0.0	48.3	50.7
Hasslö	85.5	0.9	814	69.4	11.9	4.3	2.7	4.2	7.5	0.0	73.6	18.9
Jämjö	89.9	6.2	5,737	46.3	25.4	10.7	14.9	0.6	2.1	0.0	46.9	50.9
Karlshamn	89.3	19.5	18,089	59.5	13.6	7.2	15.0	3.4	1.2	0.0	63.0	35.8
Karlskrona	88.0	23.7	21,936	55.9	7.5	16.7	16.4	1.9	1.5	0.0	57.9	40.7
Mjällby	87.1	3.5	3,247	44.0	19.2	13.2	21.5	0.9	1.1	0.2	44.9	53.8
Nättraby	93.0	2.1	1,911	57.8	13.2	11.2	15.5	1.6	0.6	0.0	59.4	40.0
Olofström	91.4	9.1	8,413	58.3	14.6	8.0	14.2	2.8	2.2	0.1	61.1	36.7
Ronneby	89.4	18.8	17,430	56.3	18.8	8.1	13.9	2.1	0.9	0.0	58.4	40.8
Rödeby	89.4	2.5	2,300	48.4	21.0	11.4	17.0	0.7	1.4	0.0	49.1	49.5
Sölvesborg	90.0	4.2	3,921	61.8	6.5	10.6	17.2	2.4	1.5	0.0	64.2	34.3
Postal vote		4.5	4,185	38.7	10.0	19.4	29.2	1.4	1.3	0.0	40.0	58.6
Total	89.2	1.9	92,666	54.7	14.7	11.0	16.1	2.1	1.4	0.0	56.9	41.7
Source:SCB

=== Dalarna ===
Dalarna County was known as Kopparberg County at the time, but shared the same borders as in the 21st century.

Kopparberg County

Location	Turnout	Share	Votes	S	C	FP	H	VPK	KDS	Other	Left	Right
Avesta	89.9	9.6	16,290	59.7	21.1	7.8	5.3	3.9	2.1	0.0	63.6	34.3
Bjursås	81.8	1.1	1,864	42.9	39.2	7.9	4.5	2.4	3.0	0.0	45.3	51.7
Borlänge	89.7	9.7	16,489	68.0	13.4	9.1	5.5	2.7	1.3	0.0	70.7	28.0
Enviken	86.1	0.7	1,196	34.4	44.1	8.8	7.0	1.3	4.3	0.0	35.7	59.9
Falun	87.5	11.0	18,827	50.1	18.0	15.8	12.7	2.2	1.2	0.0	52.3	46.5
Floda	90.0	0.8	1,416	47.2	36.9	6.5	5.7	1.6	2.0	0.0	48.8	49.2
Gagnef	88.1	2.1	3,580	51.2	33.0	8.2	3.2	1.8	2.6	0.0	53.0	44.4
Grangärde	87.3	3.7	6,260	63.7	15.1	6.0	4.9	9.6	0.8	0.0	73.3	25.9
Gustafs	87.1	1.0	1,654	35.9	44.7	10.8	4.9	1.4	2.4	0.0	37.2	60.4
Hedemora	88.3	6.0	10,159	54.7	25.8	7.5	8.0	2.1	1.9	0.0	56.9	41.3
Idre	88.7	0.5	879	58.1	16.3	20.1	2.8	2.5	0.1	0.0	60.6	39.2
Järna	88.6	2.4	4,051	48.1	27.5	8.5	7.3	5.1	3.5	0.0	53.2	43.3
Leksand	87.2	3.1	5,274	42.7	31.0	12.4	11.4	0.8	1.8	0.0	43.5	54.7
Lima	88.1	0.8	1,324	46.1	36.5	9.0	6.0	1.7	0.7	0.0	47.8	51.5
Ludvika	89.5	7.2	12,284	64.7	13.3	9.3	7.0	4.8	0.9	0.0	69.5	29.6
Malung	91.1	3.1	5,332	53.1	20.4	15.5	8.2	1.8	1.0	0.0	54.9	44.1
Mora	86.2	4.5	7,616	44.7	33.6	10.0	8.8	1.7	1.2	0.0	46.4	52.4
Nås	80.7	0.5	918	53.8	28.2	9.7	3.3	2.7	2.3	0.0	56.5	41.2
Ore	89.8	0.7	1,209	50.7	27.0	7.0	3.8	9.3	2.2	0.0	60.0	37.9
Orsa	85.3	2.5	4,253	44.9	36.1	6.5	7.4	4.0	1.2	0.0	48.9	49.9
Rättvik	81.0	3.1	5,216	42.4	33.6	12.1	9.0	1.4	1.5	0.0	43.8	54.7
Siljansnäs	81.7	0.6	997	46.5	33.8	6.6	4.6	1.0	7.4	0.0	47.5	45.0
Smedjebacken	91.6	3.5	5,980	70.6	13.3	7.0	4.9	3.5	0.7	0.0	74.1	25.2
Sollerön	83.7	0.5	930	30.2	51.5	8.4	4.9	3.4	1.5	0.0	33.7	64.8
Stora Skedvi	89.3	0.9	1,549	28.3	51.8	5.2	9.4	1.3	4.0	0.0	29.6	66.4
Stora Tuna	88.7	4.4	7,450	46.3	34.9	7.9	6.5	2.3	2.2	0.0	48.5	49.3
Sundborn	89.3	0.7	1,129	43.8	30.5	11.9	9.1	2.7	2.0	0.0	46.5	51.5
Svärdsjö	89.8	1.7	2,847	39.1	36.0	14.3	6.9	1.7	2.1	0.0	40.7	57.1
Säfsnäs	92.0	0.8	1,287	80.3	7.9	4.6	2.1	3.3	1.9	0.0	83.5	14.6
Särna	78.2	0.6	948	58.2	21.4	11.2	4.0	3.8	1.4	0.0	62.0	36.6
Säter	88.7	1.6	2,726	54.7	23.6	10.4	7.0	2.3	1.9	0.0	57.1	41.0
Söderbärke	89.6	1.0	1,789	58.4	26.9	6.8	4.1	2.6	1.3	0.0	61.0	37.7
Transtrand	87.2	0.5	927	64.5	18.6	6.8	6.5	1.8	1.8	0.0	66.3	31.8
Venjan	78.6	0.4	696	50.1	33.8	7.8	5.7	1.9	0.7	0.0	52.0	47.3
Våmhus	80.6	0.4	729	44.9	42.8	4.7	3.8	3.7	0.1	0.0	48.6	51.3
Ål	90.5	0.9	1,511	46.0	29.7	16.7	5.2	1.3	1.1	0.0	47.3	51.7
Älvdalen	84.3	2.1	3,518	42.0	39.4	8.7	5.6	2.5	1.8	0.0	44.4	53.8
Äppelbo	87.3	0.5	825	36.1	49.1	4.7	4.7	4.2	1.1	0.0	40.4	58.5
Postal vote		5.0	8,453	44.9	16.0	18.6	16.4	2.0	2.1	0.0	46.9	51.0
Total	87.9	3.5	170,382	53.5	24.0	10.3	7.6	3.0	1.6	0.0	56.4	41.9
Source:SCB

=== Gotland ===
The Centre Party and People's Party merged as "Mittenpartierna" (the Middle Parties) in this constituency. Since the Middle Parties as a combination got fewer votes than the Rightist Party nationwide, they have been listed afterwards in this chart, even though both parties individually were larger both in the constituency and nationwide. The Left Party Communists did not participate in Gotland County altogether and thus received no votes. As a result, this party chart has fewer entries than elsewhere. Changes to a nationwide parliamentary threshold rendered these arrangements obsolete from the 1970 election onward.

Location	Turnout	Share	Votes	S	H	C/FP	KDS	Other	Left	Right
Dalhem	89.6	4.2	1,374	24.9	14.4	60.3	0.4	0.0	24.9	74.7
Fårösund	91.4	4.9	1,608	55.7	8.0	36.1	0.2	0.0	55.7	44.1
Havdhem	91.4	3.9	1,279	24.3	8.1	65.5	2.0	0.0	24.3	73.7
Hemse	90.0	6.2	2,038	26.5	10.4	61.9	1.1	0.0	26.5	72.3
Hoburg	86.8	2.6	839	23.2	16.3	60.1	0.4	0.0	23.2	76.4
Klintehamn	91.4	7.7	2,499	30.9	13.3	55.3	0.5	0.0	30.9	68.7
Ljugarn	86.7	3.6	1,160	20.1	11.6	68.0	0.3	0.0	20.1	79.6
Lärbro	91.3	4.0	1,309	58.1	5.3	36.3	0.4	0.0	58.1	41.6
Romakloster	89.2	9.1	2,968	35.4	11.6	52.4	0.6	0.0	35.4	63.9
Slite	91.2	4.4	1,444	64.9	10.0	24.6	0.6	0.0	64.9	34.6
Stenkumla	90.5	5.0	1,617	30.7	12.3	56.6	0.4	0.0	30.7	69.0
Stånga	89.8	3.3	1,094	17.7	9.2	72.0	1.3	0.0	17.7	81.0
Tingstäde	92.5	5.8	1,888	29.4	8.6	61.3	0.7	0.0	29.4	69.9
Visby	88.1	30.0	9,784	53.8	18.0	27.9	0.3	0.0	53.8	45.9
Postal vote		5.4	1,761	33.8	23.5	41.5	0.4	0.7	33.8	65.0
Total	89.6	0.7	32,662	40.2	13.6	45.6	0.5	0.0	40.0	59.2
Source:SCB

=== Gävleborg ===
Location	Turnout	Share	Votes	S	C	FP	H	VPK	KDS	Other	Left	Right
Alfta	90.2	1.8	3,326	44.3	35.1	10.5	5.7	2.3	2.2	0.0	46.5	51.3
Arbrå	87.6	1.8	3,258	45.8	25.2	13.8	5.7	7.5	2.1	0.0	53.3	44.7
Bergsjö	87.6	1.0	1,830	37.2	43.4	7.0	4.2	6.7	1.5	0.0	43.8	54.7
Bjuråker	88.0	1.2	2,155	44.1	41.4	3.0	2.4	5.7	3.4	0.0	49.8	46.7
Bollnäs	85.7	5.4	9,741	53.3	23.1	10.8	6.1	5.2	1.5	0.0	58.5	40.0
Delsbo	85.2	1.4	2,490	40.5	46.3	2.9	5.9	2.4	1.9	0.0	42.9	55.2
Forsa	87.6	1.5	2,717	46.6	35.8	5.8	3.6	7.3	0.8	0.0	53.9	45.2
Färila	86.0	1.7	3,011	48.7	32.5	6.5	2.8	8.1	1.4	0.0	56.8	41.8
Gnarp	85.6	0.9	1,566	44.3	34.2	14.0	1.9	3.5	2.1	0.0	47.8	50.1
Gävle	86.5	19.0	34,504	60.0	12.1	13.9	9.9	3.1	1.0	0.0	63.1	35.9
Hamrånge	89.9	1.6	2,878	74.2	13.5	5.4	2.7	2.7	1.6	0.0	76.9	21.6
Hanebo	91.0	1.5	2,713	51.9	31.2	6.9	2.8	6.5	0.6	0.0	58.4	41.0
Harmånger	91.7	1.6	2,969	47.3	36.0	6.4	3.3	5.4	1.5	0.0	52.7	45.7
Hassela	88.1	0.6	1,003	54.0	25.1	8.9	1.7	8.4	1.9	0.0	62.4	35.7
Hedesunda	89.0	1.0	1,782	42.9	33.0	13.6	4.3	4.3	1.5	0.3	47.2	51.0
Hille	87.2	1.3	2,392	57.0	22.3	10.7	3.9	3.9	1.7	0.5	60.9	37.0
Hofors	89.7	3.9	7,008	70.5	8.6	5.7	3.8	10.8	0.6	0.0	81.3	18.1
Hudiksvall	85.5	5.0	9,125	47.8	27.1	9.3	8.0	6.6	1.1	0.0	54.4	44.5
Iggesund	88.6	2.4	4,343	56.9	25.1	5.2	2.6	9.9	0.3	0.0	66.8	32.8
Järbo	90.4	1.0	1,729	48.2	33.4	6.6	4.8	4.2	2.8	0.0	52.4	44.8
Järvsö	81.5	1.5	2,789	41.5	37.9	9.8	3.8	5.8	1.2	0.0	47.3	51.5
Ljusdal	85.9	3.3	6,024	54.9	19.6	9.5	6.4	8.5	1.1	0.0	63.4	35.5
Los	88.6	0.8	1,387	66.6	14.0	6.4	1.4	10.5	1.1	0.0	77.1	21.8
Norrala	89.7	1.2	2,258	51.2	36.2	5.2	1.7	4.3	1.3	0.0	55.5	43.1
Ockelbo	88.8	2.2	3,958	56.7	27.9	6.0	5.5	2.9	1.0	0.0	59.6	39.4
Ovansjö	89.5	2.5	4,527	60.6	23.6	4.7	3.8	6.3	0.9	0.0	66.9	32.2
Ovanåker	89.8	2.7	4,913	53.1	26.1	11.6	5.3	1.9	2.0	0.0	55.1	42.9
Ramsjö	84.7	0.4	662	45.2	16.5	3.8	1.5	32.6	0.5	0.0	77.8	21.8
Rengsjö	87.1	0.5	924	43.4	35.5	5.6	2.2	12.4	0.9	0.0	55.8	43.3
Sandviken	92.2	8.5	15,343	71.6	8.9	8.1	5.9	4.9	0.6	0.0	76.5	22.9
Skog	90.1	0.9	1,555	50.4	34.2	7.3	4.9	2.6	0.6	0.0	53.0	46.4
Storvik	92.4	0.8	1,424	57.3	14.8	16.4	7.9	3.1	0.5	0.0	60.4	39.1
Söderala	92.1	4.7	8,498	72.0	12.4	3.1	2.4	9.2	0.8	0.0	81.2	17.9
Söderhamn	88.7	4.5	8,103	61.6	12.2	9.3	9.3	6.7	0.9	0.0	68.3	30.8
Torsåker	89.1	1.0	1,828	46.0	30.7	8.3	10.5	4.0	0.5	0.0	49.9	49.5
Valbo	86.9	3.3	5,911	65.9	17.2	7.7	4.3	4.3	0.6	0.0	70.2	29.1
Årsunda	85.9	0.6	1,115	41.6	36.9	7.4	8.2	5.7	0.4	0.0	47.2	52.5
Österfärnebo	87.5	0.7	1,262	40.3	38.7	9.1	6.6	3.2	2.1	0.0	43.5	54.4
Postal vote		4.5	8,230	47.4	16.1	16.8	15.8	2.7	1.0	0.2	50.1	48.7
Total	88.0	3.8	181,251	57.0	20.6	9.5	6.5	5.4	1.1	0.0	62.4	36.5
Source:SCB

=== Halland ===
Location	Turnout	Share	Votes	S	C	FP	H	VPK	KDS	Other	Left	Right
Eldsberga	92.4	1.4	1,635	41.1	35.8	10.9	11.4	0.2	0.6	0.0	41.3	58.1
Enslöv	93.3	1.3	1,546	40.7	43.6	7.1	6.2	1.5	1.0	0.0	42.2	56.9
Falkenberg	91.7	6.7	7,705	52.1	22.0	11.4	13.0	0.8	0.5	0.1	52.9	46.5
Fjärås	90.8	1.9	2,197	28.8	52.2	6.5	11.5	0.4	0.5	0.1	29.2	70.2
Getinge	95.3	1.2	1,379	50.2	30.8	5.7	13.0	0.1	0.2	0.0	50.3	49.5
Halmstad	88.9	23.4	27,059	54.8	12.6	15.6	12.8	3.1	1.1	0.0	58.0	41.0
Harplinge	92.0	1.7	1,927	44.4	33.5	5.4	14.5	1.2	0.8	0.1	45.7	53.5
Himledalen	91.6	1.6	1,863	20.3	63.4	4.0	11.6	0.3	0.3	0.2	20.6	79.0
Hishult	84.5	0.8	889	16.8	60.2	7.5	14.1	0.8	0.7	0.0	17.5	81.8
Karup	89.1	1.4	1,590	23.6	53.1	8.0	14.5	0.3	0.5	0.0	23.9	75.6
Knäred	88.7	1.1	1,269	22.9	56.2	8.0	12.0	0.2	0.8	0.0	23.0	76.2
Kungsbacka	88.8	3.2	3,724	42.5	10.9	26.9	18.5	0.8	0.4	0.1	43.2	56.3
Kvibille	91.1	1.3	1,495	37.3	45.1	5.6	11.0	0.5	0.5	0.0	37.9	61.7
Laholm city	90.3	2.0	2,337	46.3	25.3	13.4	14.5	0.2	0.4	0.0	46.4	53.1
Laholm rural	88.6	1.0	1,150	30.8	52.6	5.7	9.6	0.9	0.4	0.0	31.7	67.9
Lindberga	90.6	1.7	1,971	24.2	50.5	8.9	15.3	0.4	0.3	0.5	24.6	74.7
Lindome	90.8	2.4	2,819	43.5	20.6	23.6	9.8	2.1	0.4	0.1	45.6	53.9
Löftadalen	91.0	1.7	1,929	20.4	56.9	9.5	11.1	0.1	1.9	0.1	20.5	77.6
Morup	90.1	2.0	2,347	27.4	56.8	5.7	9.5	0.3	0.1	0.0	27.8	72.0
Onsala	89.2	1.1	1,250	33.4	25.7	19.8	20.2	0.6	0.2	0.0	34.1	65.7
Oskarström	91.8	1.6	1,845	72.0	8.6	8.4	7.4	2.4	1.2	0.0	74.4	24.3
Ränneslöv	92.0	1.6	1,828	22.9	61.5	4.2	10.4	0.3	0.7	0.0	23.2	76.1
Särö	91.9	2.3	2,714	27.0	26.1	21.8	24.1	0.6	0.4	0.0	27.6	72.0
Söndrum	94.7	2.8	3,250	47.5	12.3	16.6	22.2	1.0	0.5	0.0	48.4	51.1
Torup	91.9	2.2	2,566	42.9	35.1	7.8	12.9	0.4	0.9	0.0	43.3	55.8
Tvååker	90.0	2.1	2,465	22.1	61.0	6.2	9.7	0.7	0.2	0.2	22.8	76.9
Tölö	88.1	1.3	1,515	38.0	34.5	13.5	12.5	0.8	0.8	0.0	38.7	60.5
Ullared	91.4	0.9	1,081	19.9	49.6	8.4	21.3	0.7	0.1	0.0	20.6	79.3
Varberg	90.0	9.7	11,180	49.3	15.6	14.5	13.6	1.5	0.6	4.9	50.8	43.7
Veddinge	88.6	1.7	1,922	26.0	48.8	7.0	15.3	0.2	2.5	0.2	26.1	71.1
Veinge	91.0	1.7	1,978	34.6	47.7	6.4	10.3	0.7	0.4	0.0	35.2	64.4
Vessigebro	91.9	1.7	2,010	22.6	59.8	5.3	11.7	0.1	0.5	0.0	22.7	76.8
Vinberg	93.4	1.6	1,860	27.8	54.9	5.4	11.2	0.2	0.4	0.0	28.0	71.6
Våxtorp	90.8	1.2	1,417	22.1	62.4	5.9	9.1	0.1	0.4	0.0	22.2	77.4
Värö	87.2	1.3	1,552	18.4	54.3	7.7	17.7	0.0	1.9	0.1	18.4	79.6
Årstad	92.1	2.0	2,336	34.8	46.8	2.7	14.8	0.4	0.6	0.0	35.1	64.3
Ättran	93.1	1.2	1,370	21.0	58.6	5.4	14.2	0.1	0.7	0.0	21.1	78.2
Postal vote		4.2	4,827	31.2	17.4	23.0	25.9	1.0	1.0	0.4	32.3	66.4
Total	90.4	2.4	115,797	41.1	29.9	12.5	13.9	1.3	0.7	0.5	42.4	56.3
Source:SCB

=== Jämtland ===
Location	Turnout	Share	Votes	S	C	FP	H	VPK	KDS	Other	Left	Right
Alsen	87.5	1.1	859	47.3	25.0	9.0	13.6	3.4	1.7	0.0	50.6	47.6
Berg	87.8	1.9	1,544	40.0	36.5	9.5	11.1	1.4	1.6	0.0	41.4	57.1
Brunflo	87.0	4.2	3,331	50.9	28.4	9.7	7.6	1.9	1.6	0.0	52.7	45.7
Bräcke	91.0	2.4	1,927	65.0	17.2	6.2	8.4	2.7	0.6	0.0	67.7	31.7
Fors	88.3	1.9	1,486	59.2	21.8	5.9	9.1	3.0	1.1	0.0	62.1	36.7
Frostviken	87.8	1.5	1,165	73.8	13.7	5.2	5.8	0.6	0.9	0.0	74.4	24.7
Frösö	89.3	6.4	5,086	47.5	19.7	15.7	14.1	0.9	2.1	0.0	48.5	49.4
Föllinge	88.5	1.9	1,511	41.4	27.1	15.6	11.0	0.9	4.1	0.0	42.3	53.6
Hackås	86.9	2.3	1,862	40.0	34.9	10.6	12.2	1.3	1.0	0.0	41.2	57.7
Hallen	85.0	1.2	970	27.4	46.9	14.1	8.9	0.9	1.8	0.0	28.4	69.9
Hammerdal	92.7	3.2	2,537	50.3	28.5	10.5	8.1	1.1	1.6	0.0	51.4	47.1
Hede	83.6	1.9	1,546	63.7	21.3	7.8	3.9	2.5	0.8	0.0	66.2	33.0
Hogdal	83.3	1.6	1,265	64.8	15.0	5.5	7.0	7.2	0.6	0.0	72.0	27.4
Hotagen	82.4	0.5	437	61.3	23.6	6.6	4.6	1.8	2.1	0.0	63.2	34.8
Kall	84.4	0.8	609	51.1	25.1	9.9	11.7	1.0	1.3	0.0	52.1	46.6
Kälarne	91.8	2.3	1,848	62.7	20.2	5.0	8.6	2.4	1.2	0.0	65.0	33.8
Lillhärdal	83.4	0.9	719	67.6	16.0	11.3	2.8	1.7	0.7	0.0	69.3	30.0
Lit	88.3	3.3	2,628	47.5	31.9	8.3	8.7	2.2	1.4	0.0	49.7	48.9
Mörsil	89.9	1.7	1,343	52.0	19.7	15.0	9.5	2.9	0.9	0.0	55.0	44.2
Offerdal	85.1	2.3	1,853	41.9	33.9	10.6	10.8	0.7	2.0	0.0	42.6	55.4
Oviken	84.0	1.7	1,328	30.6	43.3	11.4	11.8	0.8	2.1	0.0	31.4	66.5
Ragunda	90.3	3.0	2,432	61.3	22.9	5.4	7.0	1.6	1.8	0.0	62.9	35.3
Revsund	89.7	3.3	2,636	57.8	24.1	6.8	8.5	2.5	0.4	0.0	60.2	39.4
Rätan	80.9	1.2	921	68.6	14.4	7.1	4.3	4.7	0.9	0.0	73.3	25.8
Rödön	88.2	4.4	3,506	53.6	23.8	8.5	10.5	1.8	1.9	0.0	55.3	42.8
Ström	89.9	5.3	4,227	65.3	16.9	7.8	7.3	1.6	1.1	0.0	66.9	32.0
Stugun	91.8	2.0	1,604	65.5	20.0	2.7	8.7	2.8	0.2	0.0	68.3	31.5
Sveg	85.6	3.7	2,922	66.6	12.9	8.4	6.6	4.1	1.4	0.0	70.7	27.9
Tännäs	83.5	1.4	1,153	62.4	13.1	12.8	8.9	2.2	0.5	0.0	64.6	34.9
Undersåker	89.4	2.1	1,694	53.5	18.1	12.1	13.5	1.1	1.7	0.0	54.6	43.7
Åre	88.0	1.8	1,423	48.1	16.8	19.6	11.7	1.1	2.7	0.0	49.2	48.1
Östersund	88.5	18.7	14,973	54.1	12.1	14.9	15.8	1.4	1.8	0.0	55.5	42.7
Öv Ljungadalen	81.8	1.6	1,319	46.7	32.1	6.4	11.8	1.6	1.4	0.0	48.3	50.3
Postal vote		6.7	5,372	47.5	15.2	17.0	16.9	1.4	1.9	0.2	48.9	49.1
Total	87.9	1.7	80,036	53.8	20.8	11.0	11.0	1.8	1.5	0.0	55.6	42.8
Source:SCB

=== Jönköping ===
Location	Turnout	Share	Votes	S	C	FP	H	VPK	KDS	Other	Left	Right
Alseda	89.6	1.5	2,763	34.6	37.2	11.6	10.7	0.3	5.5	0.0	35.0	59.5
Anderstorp	94.9	1.2	2,317	48.7	16.7	16.3	16.1	1.2	1.1	0.0	49.9	49.0
Aneby	90.6	2.1	3,942	29.4	28.9	17.6	18.3	0.4	5.4	0.0	29.8	64.9
Bankeryd	94.5	1.6	2,947	45.7	13.8	14.9	19.1	1.3	5.1	0.0	47.0	47.9
Björkö	92.5	0.6	1,117	26.5	42.4	8.3	17.5	0.0	5.3	0.0	26.5	68.1
Bodafors	93.6	0.8	1,580	46.6	18.4	17.3	11.5	2.8	3.4	0.0	49.4	47.2
Bor	91.0	0.8	1,520	30.8	38.9	10.3	12.5	0.7	6.7	0.0	31.5	61.8
Bredaryd	94.5	0.7	1,382	33.5	36.8	10.9	14.3	0.4	4.1	0.0	33.9	62.0
Burseryd	91.6	1.0	1,781	23.8	40.8	12.4	20.1	0.1	2.8	0.0	23.9	73.3
Bäckaby	87.0	0.7	1,325	8.8	59.7	7.3	18.7	0.0	5.4	0.0	8.8	85.7
Eksjö	88.7	3.1	5,784	45.3	16.9	14.8	19.7	0.5	2.9	0.0	45.8	51.4
Forserum	93.1	1.2	2,264	47.3	26.3	10.5	12.9	0.5	2.5	0.0	47.7	49.7
Forsheda	93.0	1.1	2,070	28.2	42.8	10.7	10.7	0.7	7.0	0.0	28.8	64.2
Gislaved	93.2	2.4	4,399	59.5	16.5	9.0	10.9	1.8	2.3	0.0	61.3	36.4
Gnosjö	93.3	2.3	4,291	34.8	27.4	14.2	16.0	1.0	6.6	0.0	35.8	57.6
Gränna	89.3	1.1	1,959	35.5	23.2	12.1	22.1	0.4	6.8	0.0	35.9	57.3
Hjälmseryd	90.7	1.3	2,493	21.9	40.4	11.8	21.1	0.2	4.6	0.0	22.1	73.3
Huskvarna	91.8	5.7	10,662	58.9	8.6	14.0	12.3	3.6	2.6	0.0	62.5	34.9
Hylte	93.0	1.8	3,411	43.8	38.1	4.3	12.0	0.7	1.1	0.0	44.5	54.4
Höreda	92.6	0.9	1,653	21.4	47.9	13.7	14.2	0.1	2.8	0.0	21.5	75.7
Ingatorp	91.9	0.9	1,583	36.3	38.5	8.7	12.0	0.7	3.9	0.0	37.0	59.2
Jönköping	89.3	16.5	30,722	50.4	10.0	16.8	18.5	1.5	2.8	0.0	51.9	45.3
Klevshult	89.7	0.8	1,485	13.7	42.0	14.0	21.9	0.2	8.2	0.0	13.9	77.9
Korsberga	89.3	0.6	1,110	26.2	39.5	12.4	14.0	0.1	7.8	0.0	26.3	65.9
Lannaskede	91.7	0.9	1,732	42.9	33.6	5.1	12.4	1.3	4.8	0.0	44.2	51.0
Lekeryd	92.3	0.6	1,182	15.7	47.6	13.0	17.6	0.1	6.0	0.0	15.7	78.3
Malmbäck	92.0	0.8	1,484	25.5	37.9	11.8	21.0	0.3	3.6	0.0	25.7	70.7
Mariannelund	91.2	1.0	1,817	42.1	28.0	10.8	13.1	1.2	4.9	0.0	43.3	51.8
Månsarp	94.1	1.0	1,863	50.8	17.1	15.6	12.9	1.3	2.3	0.0	52.1	45.6
Norrahammar	94.2	2.0	3,767	65.1	11.1	8.6	9.5	3.2	2.5	0.0	68.2	29.2
Norra Mo	91.8	0.6	1,172	14.7	40.3	20.1	18.0	0.2	6.7	0.0	14.8	78.4
Norra Sandsjö	90.2	0.7	1,352	16.9	52.5	11.5	14.9	0.6	3.6	0.0	17.5	78.9
Nye	91.0	0.7	1,216	28.4	41.3	7.5	20.0	0.0	2.9	0.0	28.4	68.8
Nässjö	91.1	6.2	11,616	56.6	12.1	13.2	13.7	1.8	2.5	0.0	58.4	39.0
Reftele	90.9	1.1	1,981	22.9	52.1	8.1	14.3	0.1	2.4	0.0	23.0	74.6
Rydaholm	93.6	1.1	2,095	28.0	26.1	11.6	27.7	0.7	5.8	0.0	28.7	65.4
Skillingaryd	93.2	1.1	2,040	46.0	11.7	17.9	17.9	1.1	5.4	0.0	47.1	47.5
Skärstad	93.0	1.0	1,914	23.8	39.3	11.9	16.4	0.4	8.2	0.0	24.2	67.6
Solberga	92.5	1.0	1,950	42.5	30.8	10.8	11.1	1.1	3.7	0.0	43.6	52.7
Sävsjö	90.2	1.7	3,194	42.4	22.3	11.6	19.3	1.2	3.2	0.0	43.6	53.2
Södra Mo	94.3	0.7	1,301	20.9	36.7	22.1	18.8	0.1	1.5	0.0	21.0	77.6
Tenhult	92.7	1.6	2,984	36.5	27.4	13.0	17.1	0.9	5.0	0.0	37.5	57.6
Tranås	91.1	6.0	11,188	49.2	15.7	13.4	15.8	1.5	4.4	0.0	50.7	44.8
Unnaryd	90.7	0.8	1,410	18.4	50.9	5.2	20.0	0.1	5.4	0.0	18.5	76.1
Vaggeryd	93.7	1.6	2,965	45.5	19.8	11.4	14.6	3.8	5.0	0.0	49.2	45.7
Vetlanda city	89.4	3.3	6,158	49.3	14.5	13.4	17.2	1.7	3.9	0.0	51.0	45.1
Vetlanda rural	92.3	1.0	1,782	38.8	35.7	10.0	10.3	1.2	3.9	0.0	40.1	56.0
Villstad	93.5	1.5	2,765	41.4	30.1	9.4	15.6	0.4	3.1	0.0	41.8	55.1
Visingsö	87.0	0.2	452	19.0	53.8	11.3	13.9	0.4	1.5	0.0	19.5	79.0
Vrigstad	90.2	1.1	2,108	25.3	32.7	13.7	20.2	0.2	7.9	0.0	25.6	66.6
Värnamo	91.1	4.8	8,980	47.4	15.5	12.5	16.4	2.6	5.6	0.0	50.0	44.3
Postal vote		4.9	9,156	32.5	12.9	20.2	29.1	1.2	4.0	0.1	33.7	62.2
Total	91.2	3.9	186,184	43.0	21.5	13.5	16.7	1.4	3.9	0.0	44.3	51.7
Source:SCB

=== Kalmar ===
Location	Turnout	Share	Votes	S	C	FP	H	VPK	KDS	Other	Left	Right
Alsterbro	91.6	1.1	1,636	50.1	28.9	2.3	14.4	1.4	2.9	0.0	51.5	45.5
Borgholm	87.4	1.0	1,431	46.6	16.2	16.1	16.8	2.4	1.9	0.0	49.0	49.1
Emmaboda	90.9	1.4	2,009	62.5	12.2	8.8	12.8	3.5	0.2	0.0	66.0	33.8
Fagerhult	88.0	0.7	1,019	37.9	31.9	6.8	18.5	3.0	1.7	0.2	40.9	57.2
Fliseryd	87.4	0.7	1,090	59.9	18.5	3.5	14.6	2.3	1.2	0.0	62.2	36.6
Gamleby	89.5	2.4	3,605	51.9	26.5	5.8	12.0	2.7	1.1	0.0	54.6	44.3
Gärdslösa	86.1	1.0	1,451	22.5	56.7	3.1	16.6	0.2	0.9	0.0	22.7	76.4
Hallingeberg	94.2	1.3	1,938	66.0	18.0	5.0	7.6	2.5	1.0	0.0	68.5	30.5
Hjorted	92.1	1.0	1,495	51.1	34.0	3.1	7.4	3.5	0.9	0.0	54.6	44.5
Hultsfred	91.7	1.9	2,838	52.8	18.7	10.2	12.3	4.0	1.9	0.0	56.8	41.3
Högsby	90.4	3.1	4,589	49.7	20.9	7.0	16.0	3.1	3.2	0.2	52.8	43.8
Kalmar	88.9	14.8	21,922	56.2	9.3	12.7	18.8	2.0	1.1	0.0	58.2	40.7
Köpingsvik	86.7	0.9	1,405	15.9	63.3	4.0	15.4	0.4	1.0	0.0	16.3	82.7
Ljungbyholm	90.9	1.5	2,256	47.8	25.5	6.3	17.9	1.6	0.9	0.0	49.4	49.7
Locknevi	88.6	0.7	1,001	24.8	51.2	2.0	19.3	0.7	2.0	0.0	25.5	72.5
Loftahammar	86.4	0.5	675	26.5	38.7	4.6	28.4	0.9	0.9	0.0	27.4	71.7
Läckeby	90.9	1.2	1,710	44.6	33.0	3.6	17.3	0.5	0.9	0.0	45.1	54.0
Lönneberga	93.2	0.8	1,255	56.7	29.2	5.1	6.5	1.2	1.4	0.0	57.8	40.8
Madesjö	88.6	2.3	3,399	37.2	36.5	3.1	16.7	2.9	3.5	0.0	40.1	56.3
Mortorp	86.5	1.1	1,581	38.8	33.9	5.7	18.3	0.8	2.5	0.0	39.6	57.9
Målilla	86.6	1.0	1,552	50.5	22.6	6.6	14.6	1.5	4.2	0.0	52.0	43.8
Mönsterås	88.5	2.5	3,648	52.2	16.4	9.2	15.2	4.6	2.5	0.0	56.7	40.7
Mörbylånga	90.1	2.5	3,754	44.3	27.4	8.5	18.1	0.8	0.8	0.0	45.2	54.0
Mörlunda	89.3	1.5	2,203	44.4	29.4	4.8	14.5	0.6	6.3	0.0	45.0	48.7
Nybro	89.8	4.3	6,309	59.4	12.0	8.7	13.9	4.0	1.9	0.0	63.5	34.6
Oskarshamn	89.2	10.1	14,946	57.6	13.3	10.1	15.6	1.8	1.6	0.0	59.4	39.0
Ryssby	89.0	0.8	1,242	44.2	24.6	6.7	21.5	1.5	1.5	0.0	45.7	52.7
Sevede	92.2	1.8	2,592	27.9	54.6	3.1	12.3	1.0	1.1	0.0	28.9	70.0
Södermöre	89.4	1.1	1,640	47.1	26.5	3.4	21.3	0.6	1.1	0.0	47.7	51.2
Söderåkra	87.3	1.3	1,879	41.1	31.0	7.7	18.7	0.2	1.4	0.0	41.2	57.3
Södra Vi	90.5	1.4	2,045	34.2	42.1	6.8	14.1	0.7	1.9	0.2	34.9	63.0
Tjust-Ed	90.6	1.2	1,787	43.7	38.0	2.7	13.7	0.8	1.1	0.0	44.5	54.4
Torslunda	88.1	1.7	2,445	26.8	41.7	7.1	23.5	0.9	0.0	0.0	27.7	72.3
Torsås	87.2	2.1	3,069	30.4	42.4	6.4	19.9	0.4	2.8	0.0	30.8	66.4
Tuna	91.1	0.6	950	22.5	44.8	7.2	22.7	0.7	2.0	0.0	23.3	74.7
Uknadalen	90.2	1.3	1,851	37.0	37.0	3.3	19.0	0.5	3.2	0.0	37.4	59.3
Vena	92.4	0.8	1,199	25.0	49.7	3.5	18.7	1.0	2.1	0.0	26.0	71.9
Vimmerby	89.8	2.8	4,136	47.8	25.5	8.8	15.1	1.1	1.8	0.0	48.9	49.3
Virserum	90.4	2.0	2,906	41.8	22.7	11.3	19.4	1.3	3.4	0.0	43.1	53.5
Vissefjärda	88.0	1.5	2,184	46.0	33.9	6.1	12.2	1.2	0.5	0.0	47.3	52.2
Västervik	87.4	8.9	13,109	57.3	12.5	10.0	15.3	3.3	1.7	0.0	60.5	37.8
Ålem	89.4	2.1	3,167	54.8	17.7	7.4	14.4	3.9	1.7	0.0	58.8	39.5
Ölands-Åkerbo	89.5	1.6	2,349	26.6	53.0	7.1	9.8	1.2	2.3	0.0	27.8	69.9
Överum	94.3	1.3	1,978	68.8	11.6	4.9	9.4	2.1	3.2	0.0	70.9	25.9
Postal vote		4.6	6,813	36.6	14.0	18.9	27.5	1.4	1.5	0.1	37.9	60.4
Total	89.3	3.1	148,058	48.6	22.5	8.7	16.5	2.0	1.8	0.0	50.6	47.7
Source:SCB

=== Kronoberg ===
The leftist bloc gained one more vote in Braås over the centre-right bloc, although both finished on 49.1%.

Location	Turnout	Share	Votes	S	C	FP	H	VPK	KDS	Other	Left	Right
Algutsboda	90.2	1.7	1,795	51.2	35.3	2.9	8.4	1.7	0.6	0.0	52.9	46.6
Alvesta	90.5	4.9	5,016	48.5	25.2	9.0	12.8	3.0	1.5	0.0	51.5	47.0
Annerstad	86.1	1.5	1,512	19.4	49.7	11.2	15.5	2.6	1.7	0.0	22.0	76.3
Berga	90.7	2.0	2,095	30.1	44.2	10.2	12.4	0.7	2.5	0.0	30.7	66.7
Bergunda	90.7	2.5	2,520	46.9	28.3	7.5	15.0	1.4	1.0	0.0	48.3	50.8
Braås	90.3	1.7	1,785	43.6	29.7	6.6	12.8	5.5	1.8	0.0	49.1	49.1
Ekeberga	93.1	1.0	988	69.1	15.5	3.0	6.2	5.6	0.6	0.0	74.7	24.7
Göteryd	88.1	1.9	1,966	32.3	42.2	4.3	18.2	1.7	1.3	0.0	34.1	64.6
Hamneda	85.7	1.3	1,348	23.1	50.9	4.7	18.5	0.7	2.1	0.0	23.9	74.0
Hovmantorp	92.5	1.6	1,689	56.5	21.8	5.6	11.8	3.4	0.7	0.0	60.0	39.3
Hälleberga	92.9	1.3	1,315	63.1	19.2	5.1	7.8	4.3	0.4	0.0	67.5	32.2
Lammhult	92.0	2.0	2,031	29.3	35.6	9.5	20.9	1.0	3.6	0.0	30.3	66.0
Lenhovda	89.1	1.5	1,512	49.0	28.5	6.3	9.5	5.4	1.2	0.0	54.4	44.4
Lessebo	93.3	1.7	1,781	71.9	9.0	5.7	5.6	6.7	1.1	0.0	78.6	20.3
Lidhult	90.8	1.3	1,286	24.3	44.2	7.6	21.5	0.8	1.7	0.0	25.0	73.3
Linneryd	90.1	1.5	1,522	28.1	49.4	3.5	16.3	1.4	1.2	0.0	29.6	69.3
Ljuder	89.4	1.0	1,039	41.1	31.9	6.1	16.3	3.0	1.7	0.0	44.1	54.2
Ljungby	88.6	6.5	6,669	50.7	18.8	13.6	13.1	2.4	1.4	0.0	53.1	45.5
Markaryd	90.5	3.3	3,417	48.6	23.9	10.0	13.0	2.6	1.9	0.0	51.2	46.9
Me. Kinnevald	82.7	1.1	1,179	22.6	44.2	3.6	27.6	1.1	0.9	0.0	23.7	75.3
Moheda	88.7	2.4	2,488	29.2	37.8	8.6	18.7	1.9	3.8	0.0	31.1	65.1
Nottebäck	90.9	1.6	1,612	60.9	20.3	4.8	7.9	5.6	0.4	0.0	66.5	33.1
Rottne	88.9	2.3	2,366	36.1	40.1	4.6	16.2	1.0	2.0	0.0	37.2	60.9
Ryd	86.8	2.4	2,451	40.2	25.1	7.3	23.5	2.4	1.6	0.0	42.6	55.8
Ryssby	91.1	1.6	1,692	34.5	36.3	5.1	20.9	1.2	2.1	0.0	35.6	62.2
Skatelöv	87.5	0.9	954	30.3	38.8	4.2	25.2	0.5	1.0	0.0	30.8	68.1
Stenbrohult	92.7	1.7	1,746	59.7	13.9	6.6	17.4	1.4	1.0	0.0	61.2	37.8
Södra Sandsjö	84.4	1.0	983	42.6	30.2	5.9	13.4	7.6	0.2	0.0	50.3	49.5
Tingsryd	88.4	1.8	1,877	37.0	26.3	8.8	25.7	1.2	1.0	0.0	38.2	60.8
Traryd	87.7	3.0	3,094	47.0	27.0	9.5	13.2	1.0	2.4	0.0	48.1	49.6
Urshult	87.7	1.6	1,667	33.7	32.2	5.7	27.1	1.0	0.3	0.0	34.7	65.0
Virestad	91.0	1.4	1,483	29.5	41.5	3.4	23.9	0.6	1.1	0.0	30.1	68.8
Vislanda	90.3	1.8	1,902	39.1	33.2	9.1	15.8	0.7	2.1	0.0	39.8	58.1
Väckelsång	88.4	1.4	1,455	26.9	45.0	4.1	22.4	0.7	1.0	0.0	27.6	71.5
Västra Torsås	82.5	1.0	1,042	24.6	50.3	5.8	17.7	0.7	1.1	0.0	25.2	73.7
Växjö	88.8	17.5	17,989	49.7	15.5	12.9	18.8	2.4	0.8	0.0	52.0	47.2
Åseda	87.5	2.1	2,175	38.2	31.8	8.8	16.1	3.9	1.2	0.0	42.0	56.7
Älghult	90.3	2.1	2,159	48.0	29.3	5.1	10.3	6.7	0.6	0.0	54.7	44.7
Älmeboda	84.0	1.7	1,730	25.1	48.7	4.3	19.9	0.8	1.1	0.0	25.9	73.0
Älmhult	90.1	3.2	3,322	56.2	13.0	11.5	15.0	2.5	1.8	0.0	58.7	39.5
Östra Torsås	89.9	1.5	1,572	42.4	33.1	7.6	13.1	2.9	0.8	0.0	45.3	53.9
Postal vote		4.5	4,619	35.1	17.0	19.3	24.9	2.0	1.7	0.1	37.1	61.1
Total	89.1	2.1	102,843	43.3	27.2	9.0	16.6	2.4	1.4	0.0	45.7	52.9
Source:SCB

=== Norrbotten ===
Location	Turnout	Share	Votes	S	C	FP	H	VPK	KDS	Other	Left	Right
Arjeplog	85.5	1.7	2,545	54.1	11.6	8.5	4.2	18.7	2.9	0.0	72.9	24.2
Arvidsjaur	88.3	3.5	5,223	56.5	14.0	7.8	5.2	14.6	1.8	0.0	71.1	27.1
Boden	88.2	9.5	14,026	57.9	12.6	10.6	10.3	6.2	2.5	0.0	64.1	33.5
Edefors	85.7	1.1	1,603	59.3	10.4	8.2	6.4	11.5	4.2	0.0	70.8	25.0
Gällivare	83.6	8.6	12,668	54.8	7.5	6.3	11.4	18.8	1.1	0.0	73.7	25.2
Haparanda	87.2	3.0	4,469	51.0	19.9	5.3	13.6	9.2	1.0	0.0	60.2	38.8
Hietaniemi	87.2	0.7	1,014	41.0	36.0	3.2	8.4	10.5	0.7	0.3	51.5	47.5
Jokkmokk	81.4	3.1	4,637	61.2	7.6	7.5	7.0	15.0	1.4	0.1	76.3	22.2
Junosuando	81.7	0.5	715	60.8	11.5	3.9	12.0	10.3	1.4	0.0	71.2	27.4
Kalix	91.3	7.3	10,774	64.4	14.8	5.1	7.8	7.1	0.9	0.0	71.6	27.6
Karesuando	68.9	0.3	480	46.0	14.4	10.4	17.5	3.1	8.5	0.0	49.2	42.3
Kiruna	82.0	8.6	12,704	61.0	3.4	11.7	6.7	15.7	1.4	0.0	76.7	21.9
Korpilombolo	88.3	1.0	1,548	66.6	7.4	3.2	2.3	19.1	1.5	0.0	85.7	12.9
Luleå	88.1	13.0	19,121	60.2	8.3	11.3	10.0	9.2	1.0	0.0	69.3	29.6
Nederluleå	89.6	5.5	8,095	47.8	21.7	9.6	13.0	4.8	3.1	0.0	52.6	44.3
Pajala	87.4	1.9	2,779	43.3	13.1	3.8	13.2	24.7	1.9	0.0	68.0	30.1
Piteå	91.8	12.8	18,939	63.6	15.8	5.2	5.6	6.2	3.6	0.0	69.8	26.6
Råneå	89.3	2.0	2,962	49.5	18.9	7.7	10.5	11.3	2.0	0.0	60.8	37.2
Tärendö	85.8	0.7	981	49.5	16.4	4.8	9.3	18.8	1.2	0.0	68.3	30.5
Älvsby	89.9	1.9	2,789	55.2	15.5	2.9	3.3	18.9	4.1	0.0	74.1	21.8
Älvsbyn	90.8	1.7	2,467	60.6	12.3	8.4	5.9	9.3	3.5	0.0	69.9	26.6
Överkalix	87.0	2.5	3,754	61.7	17.3	3.0	4.4	13.2	0.3	0.0	74.9	24.7
Övertorneå	87.3	2.1	3,036	46.9	24.1	3.8	10.9	13.2	0.7	0.4	60.1	38.8
Postal vote		6.9	10,203	55.4	9.2	13.6	12.7	6.9	2.1	0.2	62.3	35.4
Total	87.3	3.1	147,532	57.8	12.4	8.1	8.9	10.8	2.0	0.0	68.6	29.4
Source:SCB

=== Skåne ===
The province of Skåne, later unified into one county, was divided into Malmöhus and Kristianstad counties at the time, also resulting in three separate constituencies, one for each county and a third for the metropolitan area of Öresund, that was part of Malmöhus.

==== Four-city constituency ====
(Swedish: Fyrstadskretsen) The centre-right parties participated under two different constellations Samling68 (Coalition68) including all three of the Centre Party, People's Party and the Rightist Party and the Mittenpartierna (the Middle Parties) including only the two former. These have been listed in place of their origin parties in the list order based on the national results.

Location	Turnout	Share	Votes	S	C/FP/H	C/FP	VPK	KDS	Other	Left	Right
Hälsingborg	89.7	18.5	48,660	56.9	29.8	10.5	2.0	0.9	0.0	58.9	40.2
Landskrona	91.3	7.2	19,073	67.7	18.8	10.8	1.5	1.2	0.0	69.2	29.6
Lund	91.4	11.1	29,315	51.0	33.6	13.2	1.6	0.6	0.0	52.6	46.8
Malmö	90.5	56.7	149,443	58.2	30.6	8.7	1.8	0.7	0.0	60.0	39.3
Postal vote		6.5	17,187	34.5	49.5	13.8	1.4	0.7	0.2	35.8	63.3
Total	91.4	5.5	263,678	56.3	31.1	10.0	1.8	0.8	0.0	58.1	41.1
Source:SCB

==== Kristianstad ====
Location	Turnout	Share	Votes	S	C	FP	H	VPK	KDS	Other	Left	Right
Ausås	90.2	1.0	1,621	26.2	41.4	6.9	24.4	0.1	1.0	0.0	26.3	72.7
Barkåkra	86.7	1.2	1,997	36.6	23.4	11.4	27.6	0.2	0.8	0.0	36.8	62.4
Bjärnum	92.1	1.7	2,831	44.9	26.1	11.5	14.3	0.1	3.0	0.0	45.1	52.0
Borrby	85.7	1.2	2,011	39.3	28.9	16.4	14.6	0.1	0.7	0.0	39.4	59.9
Broby	90.3	1.4	2,254	52.2	18.5	12.2	13.4	1.9	1.8	0.0	54.1	44.1
Bromölla	93.1	2.9	4,863	73.3	7.7	8.6	6.1	3.8	0.5	0.0	77.1	22.5
Brösarp	85.2	0.9	1,517	29.5	38.4	15.9	15.0	0.0	1.2	0.0	29.5	69.3
Båstad	87.5	0.8	1,336	30.8	15.3	24.3	28.4	0.1	1.1	0.0	30.8	68.0
Degeberga	87.3	1.4	2,248	38.0	30.7	15.3	14.4	0.1	1.5	0.0	38.1	60.4
Everöd	89.8	0.7	1,134	54.6	20.0	11.2	10.7	0.5	3.0	0.0	55.1	41.9
Fjälkinge	90.5	1.9	3,193	59.1	20.6	10.5	8.3	0.2	1.3	0.0	59.3	39.4
Förslövsholm	87.6	1.3	2,208	25.8	40.2	9.1	24.0	0.1	0.8	0.0	25.9	73.3
Glemmingebro	89.1	0.7	1,220	32.9	44.3	8.8	13.3	0.0	0.7	0.0	32.9	66.4
Glimåkra	89.1	1.0	1,699	50.2	24.5	11.1	10.1	1.8	2.3	0.0	52.0	45.7
Hammenhög	87.9	0.9	1,492	35.5	37.1	10.3	16.0	0.3	0.8	0.1	35.8	63.3
Hjärnarp	86.0	0.8	1,265	30.0	35.7	5.5	26.9	0.6	1.4	0.0	30.5	68.1
Hjärsås	91.6	1.0	1,620	68.9	13.4	10.3	5.1	1.5	0.7	0.0	70.4	28.8
Hässleholm	89.2	5.5	9,110	50.4	13.8	16.2	16.3	0.9	2.3	0.0	51.3	46.3
Hästveda	89.8	1.0	1,729	33.8	40.9	6.9	14.3	0.6	3.4	0.0	34.4	62.2
Kivik	87.4	1.6	2,698	35.9	25.5	14.6	23.3	0.0	0.6	0.0	36.0	63.4
Klippan	91.8	3.4	5,653	54.9	19.5	9.6	14.3	0.8	0.9	0.0	55.7	43.4
Knislinge	92.3	1.6	2,589	64.6	15.6	9.9	7.6	0.9	1.3	0.0	65.5	33.2
Kristianstad	90.2	15.4	25,480	54.0	13.1	16.2	15.1	0.8	0.9	0.0	54.7	44.4
Kvidinge	90.0	0.8	1,326	35.2	32.1	10.0	20.8	0.5	1.4	0.0	35.7	62.9
Loshult	91.2	0.6	978	45.5	27.9	5.9	15.3	1.4	3.9	0.0	46.9	49.2
Löderup	86.1	0.9	1,517	32.0	35.0	12.5	19.8	0.4	0.4	0.0	32.4	67.2
Munka-Ljungby	83.1	1.1	1,785	29.8	29.7	9.8	28.1	0.6	1.9	0.0	30.4	67.7
Näsum	84.6	0.7	1,099	52.3	22.1	8.6	11.1	3.9	1.9	0.0	56.2	41.9
Onslunda	88.6	0.8	1,259	28.4	41.1	14.3	14.9	0.1	1.1	0.0	28.5	70.4
Oppmanna-Vånga	90.1	0.9	1,562	43.3	30.7	14.3	10.0	0.4	1.3	0.0	43.7	55.0
Osby	89.2	2.8	4,547	48.9	22.9	10.2	14.6	1.0	2.5	0.0	49.9	47.7
Perstorp	90.2	2.5	4,120	52.1	17.8	11.6	16.0	1.7	0.7	0.0	53.9	45.4
Riseberga	87.6	1.6	2,688	39.1	29.7	8.8	21.6	0.5	0.3	0.0	39.7	60.0
Simrishamn	85.1	2.8	4,543	53.6	16.2	13.1	15.7	0.6	0.7	0.1	54.2	45.0
Skånes-Fagerhult	89.2	0.7	1,116	34.1	23.4	8.2	32.7	0.5	1.2	0.0	34.6	64.2
Smedstorp	84.3	0.7	1,080	28.7	35.1	20.1	15.4	0.6	0.2	0.0	29.3	70.6
Stoby	90.1	1.1	1,888	37.3	37.1	11.8	12.1	0.5	1.2	0.0	37.8	61.0
Sösdala	88.0	1.7	2,751	35.3	31.3	12.3	18.5	0.5	2.0	0.0	35.8	62.2
Tollarp	89.6	1.6	2,575	42.0	23.0	17.9	13.6	0.5	3.1	0.0	42.5	54.4
Tomelilla	84.1	2.3	3,823	44.9	23.5	14.1	15.6	0.1	1.8	0.0	45.0	53.2
Tommarp	86.2	1.2	1,940	37.0	33.5	13.2	15.2	0.7	0.5	0.0	37.6	61.8
Tyringe	88.7	2.8	4,591	37.6	30.1	12.5	15.8	1.5	2.4	0.0	39.1	58.4
Vinslöv rural	87.7	0.8	1,373	30.9	38.7	13.5	13.4	0.7	2.8	0.0	31.5	65.6
Vinslöv town	90.7	0.8	1,390	51.4	12.9	15.5	17.1	0.5	2.7	0.0	51.9	45.5
Vittsjö	91.0	1.4	2,373	30.8	32.3	14.2	19.6	0.5	2.6	0.0	31.4	66.1
Västra Bjäre	87.8	1.3	2,141	20.1	46.1	6.3	26.9	0.0	0.6	0.0	20.1	79.3
Åhus	90.8	1.7	2,879	56.2	13.7	11.5	16.9	0.6	1.1	0.0	56.8	42.1
Åstorp	91.7	2.9	4,735	61.8	13.7	8.3	14.6	0.8	0.9	0.0	62.6	36.5
Ängelholm	90.3	5.1	8,380	49.1	12.7	11.6	25.0	0.6	1.1	0.0	49.7	49.2
Örkelljunga	89.2	2.5	4,092	29.6	24.5	13.9	28.3	0.4	3.4	0.0	30.0	66.6
Örkened	89.7	1.5	2,429	52.9	21.7	13.2	8.0	3.3	0.9	0.0	56.2	42.9
Östra Ljungby	88.0	0.9	1,486	35.2	34.0	10.7	19.0	0.2	0.9	0.0	35.4	63.7
Postal vote		4.1	6,720	33.1	13.4	21.0	29.4	0.9	2.0	0.2	34.0	63.8
Total	89.2	3.4	164,954	46.0	21.7	13.0	17.1	0.8	1.4	0.0	46.8	51.7
Source:SCB

==== Malmöhus County ====
Location	Turnout	Share	Votes	S	C	FP	H	VPK	KDS	Other	Left	Right
Bara	91.6	1.0	1,600	47.8	28.2	9.5	13.9	0.2	0.4	0.0	47.9	51.6
Billesholm	91.4	1.3	2,134	65.6	17.3	7.9	7.9	1.4	0.0	0.0	67.0	33.0
Bjuv	92.3	1.9	3,123	72.0	9.3	5.9	11.7	0.4	0.6	0.0	72.5	26.9
Bjärsjölagård	86.3	1.2	2,027	25.7	49.5	11.8	11.9	0.0	1.0	0.0	25.7	73.3
Blentarp	92.2	0.6	1,004	33.2	51.2	6.8	8.6	0.0	0.3	0.0	33.2	66.5
Brunnby	89.8	0.9	1,480	35.7	18.2	13.3	32.2	0.0	0.5	0.0	35.7	63.8
Bunkeflo	93.6	1.6	2,697	55.7	17.6	9.8	16.5	0.5	0.0	0.0	56.2	43.8
Burlöv	92.5	3.8	6,328	61.6	10.5	10.3	15.9	1.4	0.3	0.0	63.0	36.7
Dalby	92.9	1.5	2,525	51.6	26.7	8.9	12.1	0.3	0.4	0.0	51.9	47.6
Ekeby	92.1	1.2	1,958	66.0	20.7	4.6	7.2	1.1	0.4	0.0	67.1	32.5
Eslöv	90.8	5.3	8,853	54.9	18.2	13.2	13.2	0.0	0.6	0.0	54.9	44.5
Furulund	92.7	1.2	1,931	67.7	14.8	8.7	7.9	0.3	0.6	0.0	68.0	31.4
Genarp	92.4	0.8	1,423	45.6	36.1	5.2	12.2	0.2	0.8	0.0	45.8	53.4
Harrie	95.5	1.0	1,621	58.5	28.2	5.2	7.6	0.3	0.2	0.0	58.8	41.0
Herrestad	92.1	1.7	2,769	45.1	35.1	7.7	11.7	0.0	0.4	0.0	45.1	54.5
Härslöv	94.0	1.1	1,867	50.2	23.5	9.2	16.2	0.2	0.7	0.0	50.4	48.8
Höganäs	92.5	4.9	8,270	57.3	11.4	12.2	17.6	0.2	1.4	0.0	57.5	41.2
Hörby	90.6	1.5	2,569	42.9	17.7	25.9	11.1	0.0	2.4	0.0	43.0	54.7
Höör	90.6	1.5	2,497	40.8	14.7	18.1	25.2	0.0	0.9	0.2	40.8	58.0
Jonstorp	90.7	0.8	1,379	31.7	31.0	11.7	24.5	0.1	1.0	0.0	31.8	67.2
Kattarp	89.8	0.9	1,476	57.2	19.2	8.0	14.8	0.1	0.7	0.0	57.3	42.0
Kågeröd	91.8	0.8	1,414	43.8	34.2	9.1	11.8	0.1	1.0	0.0	43.8	55.2
Kävlinge	92.9	2.1	3,458	60.8	19.8	8.4	10.3	0.5	0.3	0.0	61.3	38.4
Ljunits	91.7	0.9	1,462	44.1	38.0	7.3	10.3	0.0	0.2	0.1	44.1	55.6
Lomma	92.6	3.5	5,859	52.8	14.3	12.2	20.1	0.3	0.3	0.0	53.2	46.6
Långaröd	86.4	0.6	988	13.7	49.2	19.5	14.9	0.0	2.7	0.0	13.7	83.6
Löberöd	87.0	1.1	1,761	31.6	44.5	10.4	12.0	0.0	1.4	0.0	31.6	67.0
Löddeköpinge	91.0	0.8	1,423	49.1	30.5	10.1	9.6	0.4	0.3	0.0	49.5	50.2
Marieholm	91.6	1.1	1,900	46.5	37.9	6.4	8.6	0.0	0.6	0.0	46.5	52.8
Månstorp	92.1	0.9	1,515	49.2	32.8	4.8	12.5	0.1	0.5	0.0	49.3	50.2
Mörarp	93.6	1.5	2,450	50.3	24.1	5.3	20.0	0.2	0.0	0.0	50.6	49.4
Norra Frost	85.8	0.9	1,427	29.6	42.4	13.5	14.2	0.0	0.1	0.1	29.6	70.1
Rydsgård	92.3	1.2	2,024	37.5	45.8	8.2	8.3	0.0	0.2	0.0	37.5	62.2
Räng	92.9	1.0	1,719	42.6	17.6	13.6	26.1	0.1	0.1	0.0	42.6	57.3
Rönneberga	92.7	1.3	2,203	50.2	28.8	7.9	12.8	0.0	0.4	0.0	50.2	49.4
Röstånga	89.1	1.0	1,629	33.8	39.7	12.9	13.1	0.0	0.5	0.0	33.8	65.7
Sjöbo	91.6	1.5	2,574	51.4	26.8	12.1	9.6	0.0	0.1	0.0	51.4	48.5
Skanör-Falsterbo	91.2	0.7	1,205	28.0	10.1	16.0	44.6	0.0	1.2	0.0	28.0	70.8
Skarhult	89.2	0.8	1,404	39.8	41.0	6.6	12.0	0.1	0.6	0.0	39.9	59.5
Skurup	90.4	1.8	2,988	50.9	27.5	8.2	12.4	0.1	0.8	0.0	51.0	48.1
Snogeröd	87.9	0.8	1,407	27.8	40.2	13.6	17.6	0.0	0.9	0.0	27.8	71.4
Staffanstorp	93.7	2.9	4,902	44.1	25.4	10.3	19.8	0.3	0.2	0.0	44.4	55.4
Svalöv	93.5	1.2	1,986	59.6	21.2	6.8	12.0	0.1	0.3	0.0	59.6	40.0
Svedala	93.4	2.4	4,064	60.5	21.1	7.8	9.0	0.5	1.1	0.0	61.1	37.9
Södra Sandby	92.9	1.3	2,197	52.2	26.7	7.3	13.1	0.3	0.5	0.0	52.4	47.1
Teckomatorp	90.7	1.0	1,594	47.9	31.2	6.7	14.1	0.0	0.1	0.0	47.9	52.0
Trelleborg	91.0	12.3	20,641	60.6	16.6	10.4	11.4	0.5	0.6	0.0	61.0	38.4
Vallåkra	93.3	1.5	2,437	40.4	32.5	9.5	17.2	0.2	0.2	0.0	40.6	59.2
Veberöd	90.5	0.8	1,260	44.5	34.9	8.8	11.4	0.2	0.1	0.0	44.8	55.2
Vellinge	91.4	1.3	2,187	55.2	21.1	10.7	12.6	0.2	0.2	0.0	55.4	44.4
Vemmenhög	90.1	1.1	1,804	41.0	38.6	9.8	10.5	0.0	0.1	0.0	41.0	58.9
Vollsjö	86.5	1.1	1,874	22.9	50.7	12.8	13.2	0.1	0.3	0.0	23.0	76.7
Ystad	91.2	5.2	8,742	62.7	8.1	15.0	13.9	0.2	0.2	0.0	62.9	36.9
Ödåkra	92.2	1.8	2,971	37.7	21.0	11.8	28.5	0.4	0.5	0.0	38.1	61.4
Östra Frosta	86.1	1.5	2,500	21.5	46.4	18.8	11.5	0.0	1.7	0.0	21.5	76.8
Östra Färs	87.6	1.4	2,314	24.5	49.5	12.9	13.1	0.0	0.1	0.0	24.5	75.4
Postal vote		3.5	5,832	32.1	14.0	18.1	34.2	0.6	0.7	0.2	32.7	66.3
Total	91.4	3.5	167,646	50.1	23.1	11.0	15.0	0.3	0.6	0.0	50.4	49.0
Source:SCB

=== Stockholm ===
Stockholm County was divided into Stockholm Municipality and the surrounding county of suburbs or more rural areas.

==== Stockholm (city) ====
Location	Turnout	Share	Votes	S	C	FP	H	VPK	KDS	Other	Left	Right
Stockholm	87.4	100.0	492,100	47.8	6.5	19.9	19.6	4.9	1.2	0.1	52.7	46.0
Total	87.4	10.2	492,100	47.8	6.5	19.9	19.6	4.9	1.2	0.1	52.7	46.0
Source:SCB

==== Stockholm County ====
Location	Turnout	Share	Votes	S	C	FP	H	VPK	KDS	Other	Left	Right
Almunge	88.3	0.3	1,014	45.6	32.1	8.1	10.1	2.5	1.8	0.0	48.0	50.2
Blidö	85.9	0.1	518	28.2	17.0	21.2	32.2	1.4	0.0	0.0	29.5	70.5
Boo	89.9	1.2	4,213	50.8	11.4	18.4	13.8	4.7	0.9	0.0	55.5	43.6
Botkyrka	91.0	2.2	8,121	54.3	8.0	21.2	12.8	3.1	0.6	0.0	57.4	42.0
Danderyd	92.0	2.4	8,566	33.8	8.5	24.5	29.9	2.3	0.9	0.1	36.1	62.9
Djursholm	92.6	1.9	6,972	19.7	5.2	19.6	53.6	1.2	0.5	0.1	21.0	78.4
Djurö	78.7	0.2	766	32.9	19.5	20.4	25.1	1.2	1.0	0.0	34.1	64.9
Ekerö	89.6	0.9	3,139	41.0	16.6	18.6	19.5	3.3	0.9	0.0	44.3	54.8
Frötuna	87.6	0.3	975	35.6	30.3	14.9	16.0	1.1	2.2	0.0	36.7	61.1
Färingsö	91.5	0.5	1,929	48.6	21.8	14.4	11.0	2.7	1.5	0.0	51.3	47.2
Grödinge	92.0	0.4	1,282	41.1	19.0	19.0	19.0	1.6	0.2	0.0	42.7	57.1
Gustavsberg	92.2	1.0	3,473	68.8	8.9	11.2	5.7	4.5	0.9	0.0	73.3	25.8
Huddinge	89.9	7.0	25,333	51.7	10.8	20.6	10.7	5.0	1.1	0.0	56.8	42.1
Häverö	87.0	1.2	4,531	58.4	20.7	8.4	7.9	3.6	1.1	0.0	61.9	37.0
Järfälla	91.9	5.4	19,752	49.5	10.3	22.8	13.0	3.4	1.1	0.0	52.8	46.1
Järna	89.2	0.9	3,368	56.6	15.6	12.1	10.7	2.9	2.1	0.0	59.4	38.5
Knivsta	88.6	0.9	3,187	43.8	28.6	11.8	13.1	1.3	1.3	0.0	45.1	53.6
Knutby	89.3	0.4	1,465	34.9	41.2	8.0	12.4	1.0	2.5	0.0	35.9	61.6
Lidingö	91.7	5.1	18,510	31.9	7.0	23.7	34.5	2.2	0.7	0.1	34.1	65.1
Lyhundra	87.1	0.6	2,276	32.8	44.5	6.8	14.0	0.6	1.4	0.0	33.3	65.2
Märsta	88.1	2.1	7,769	51.5	18.7	16.7	9.3	3.1	0.7	0.0	54.6	44.7
Nacka	91.2	3.6	13,174	49.1	6.4	19.4	20.5	4.0	0.7	0.0	53.0	46.3
Norrtälje	88.0	1.8	6,388	52.3	13.8	15.6	14.0	2.5	1.8	0.0	54.8	43.4
Nynäshamn	91.5	1.7	6,253	66.7	8.1	12.8	7.2	4.3	0.8	0.0	71.1	28.1
Rimbo	88.9	1.1	3,895	49.3	27.0	10.3	10.1	1.9	1.4	0.0	51.2	47.4
Roslags-Länna	86.2	0.3	1,159	29.3	35.4	14.8	18.8	0.3	1.4	0.0	29.6	69.0
Salem	90.4	0.5	1,975	45.3	12.1	21.0	18.3	1.9	1.5	0.0	47.2	51.3
Saltsjöbaden	93.1	0.9	3,379	33.1	5.1	20.3	39.4	1.7	0.4	0.0	34.7	64.8
Sigtuna	92.5	0.6	2,084	39.9	14.5	16.7	26.4	1.1	1.2	0.1	41.0	57.6
Sollentuna	92.2	5.2	18,695	45.5	9.5	23.0	17.5	3.1	1.5	0.0	48.6	49.9
Solna	89.0	8.8	31,829	48.4	7.1	21.3	17.1	4.9	1.2	0.0	53.3	45.4
Sorunda	90.7	0.5	1,664	50.7	28.6	8.4	7.9	3.4	1.0	0.0	54.1	45.0
Sundbyberg	89.9	4.6	16,589	59.2	7.2	17.5	9.8	5.4	0.9	0.0	64.6	34.4
Södertälje	89.7	7.5	27,168	57.1	9.7	16.2	12.0	3.8	1.1	0.0	60.9	38.0
Turinge	91.4	0.5	1,876	60.7	15.7	10.1	8.5	3.3	1.7	0.0	64.0	34.3
Tyresö	91.2	2.7	9,787	49.2	9.9	23.5	12.4	4.5	0.5	0.0	53.7	45.8
Täby	91.6	4.7	16,919	38.8	11.4	21.5	24.9	2.5	0.9	0.0	41.3	57.8
Upplands-Väsby	90.0	1.9	6,792	55.7	12.1	15.6	11.6	3.4	1.5	0.1	59.1	39.3
Vallentuna	92.1	1.2	4,226	44.7	17.8	16.4	16.7	2.5	1.9	0.0	47.2	50.9
Vaxholm	90.3	0.7	2,450	49.9	13.3	19.3	15.3	1.2	1.0	0.0	51.1	47.9
Väddö	82.0	0.4	1,555	38.4	28.0	14.5	16.7	2.1	0.3	0.1	40.5	59.2
Värmdö	85.2	0.3	1,134	46.1	15.2	19.0	14.4	2.7	2.6	0.0	48.9	48.5
Västerhaninge	89.2	1.5	5,304	51.0	16.1	16.9	11.1	3.9	1.0	0.0	55.0	44.1
Ösmo	87.1	0.5	1,684	59.4	18.1	10.6	6.8	4.6	0.5	0.0	64.1	35.5
Össeby	90.2	0.3	1,224	44.6	28.3	10.3	13.3	2.4	0.7	0.3	47.0	52.0
Österhaninge	89.7	3.0	11,027	51.2	12.7	21.7	10.2	3.7	0.5	0.0	54.9	44.6
Österåker	89.8	1.6	5,957	45.1	15.0	20.6	16.8	2.2	0.3	0.0	47.2	52.5
Östhammar	85.0	1.4	5,125	44.3	30.0	10.2	12.7	1.6	1.3	0.0	45.9	52.8
Postal vote		7.3	26,506	36.2	8.9	22.7	29.2	1.9	1.0	0.1	38.1	60.9
Total	90.2	7.5	362,977	47.2	11.6	19.2	17.6	3.3	1.0	0.0	50.5	48.4
Source:SCB

=== Södermanland ===
Location	Turnout	Share	Votes	S	C	FP	H	VPK	KDS	Other	Left	Right
Bettna	91.0	1.3	1,915	47.9	30.9	7.0	12.6	0.5	1.1	0.0	48.4	50.5
Björkvik	92.6	0.8	1,109	43.1	36.1	8.3	10.6	0.5	1.4	0.0	43.6	55.0
Daga	88.4	1.2	1,747	37.2	35.1	13.5	12.1	1.0	1.1	0.0	38.2	60.7
Eskilstuna	90.4	25.6	37,760	62.4	7.3	19.0	7.3	2.7	1.2	0.0	65.1	33.6
Flen	91.5	3.7	5,415	55.8	17.7	12.7	10.6	1.8	1.3	0.0	57.6	41.1
Floda	90.1	0.7	1,093	38.6	35.3	11.9	12.0	0.6	1.6	0.0	39.2	59.2
Gnesta	90.5	1.4	2,013	52.3	21.9	13.8	10.2	1.1	0.7	0.0	53.4	45.9
Husby-Rekarne	93.6	1.3	1,950	56.5	18.3	15.2	8.5	0.6	0.8	0.0	57.1	42.1
Hällby	91.7	1.3	1,886	50.9	18.0	19.6	8.8	2.0	0.7	0.0	52.9	46.4
Hölö	91.6	0.7	1,057	53.0	27.0	7.9	10.9	0.6	0.8	0.0	53.5	45.7
Julita	90.2	1.0	1,452	41.8	31.1	12.9	10.2	1.0	3.0	0.0	42.8	54.2
Jönåker	88.5	1.6	2,368	52.4	26.1	6.3	12.5	0.4	2.3	0.0	52.7	44.9
Kafjärden	91.0	1.2	1,767	34.0	37.0	13.8	12.5	1.0	1.8	0.0	35.0	63.2
Katrineholm	91.9	8.7	12,867	65.2	8.9	13.0	8.9	1.0	2.1	0.0	66.2	31.7
Malmköping	89.5	1.4	1,992	45.1	25.2	13.2	14.5	0.8	1.3	0.0	45.9	52.8
Mariefred	90.9	1.0	1,514	44.5	20.0	17.5	16.6	0.8	0.5	0.0	45.3	54.2
Mellösa	94.1	1.5	2,243	68.1	15.2	8.9	5.7	1.3	0.7	0.0	69.5	29.8
Nyköping	92.0	12.5	18,469	60.8	11.4	13.4	11.6	1.2	1.6	0.0	62.0	36.4
Oxelösund	91.0	4.9	7,169	71.3	7.7	10.2	5.9	4.2	0.7	0.0	75.5	23.8
Rönö	92.1	0.9	1,307	36.3	40.6	8.8	12.3	0.2	1.9	0.0	36.4	61.7
Sköldinge	92.2	1.3	1,989	52.2	23.5	12.4	8.7	1.4	1.7	0.0	53.6	44.6
Stallarholmen	89.7	0.8	1,240	47.2	27.3	9.0	15.0	0.8	0.7	0.0	48.0	51.3
Stigtomta	91.4	0.8	1,230	49.4	31.4	6.9	10.6	0.2	1.5	0.0	49.7	48.9
Stora Malm	91.8	1.1	1,587	49.2	29.6	10.8	8.8	0.7	0.8	0.0	49.9	49.3
Strängnäs	91.0	3.8	5,596	48.7	10.4	22.0	16.0	0.7	2.2	0.0	49.4	48.4
Torshälla	91.0	2.5	3,700	63.1	8.4	15.7	8.7	3.2	0.9	0.0	66.3	32.8
Tosterö	91.2	0.5	725	44.1	23.3	15.9	14.5	0.3	1.9	0.0	44.4	53.7
Trosa	91.2	0.7	1,038	55.1	14.1	14.4	15.4	0.0	1.1	0.0	55.1	43.8
Tunaberg	94.1	0.8	1,125	66.6	17.2	6.2	6.8	2.4	0.8	0.0	69.0	30.2
Tystberga	91.8	1.1	1,633	44.2	34.2	7.7	10.5	0.9	2.6	0.0	45.1	52.4
Vagnhärad	90.4	1.1	1,551	52.5	26.4	9.0	9.0	0.4	2.6	0.0	52.9	44.4
Vingåker	91.2	3.7	5,424	54.1	20.1	14.4	7.7	1.5	2.2	0.0	55.6	42.2
Vårfruberga	88.8	0.6	921	27.0	45.3	12.2	11.9	0.1	3.5	0.0	27.1	69.4
Västra Rekarne	91.8	1.3	1,912	31.3	41.2	17.2	7.7	0.5	2.1	0.0	31.9	66.1
Åker	92.6	1.4	2,018	70.8	12.5	10.4	5.4	0.6	0.3	0.0	71.5	28.2
Ärla	90.9	1.1	1,556	47.9	25.0	15.2	8.4	0.2	3.3	0.0	48.1	48.6
Postal vote		4.9	7,006	42.2	9.7	23.5	21.1	1.6	1.8	0.2	43.7	54.3
Total	91.2	3.1	147,344	56.8	14.9	15.1	10.0	1.7	1.5	0.0	58.5	40.0
Source:SCB

=== Uppsala ===
Location	Turnout	Share	Votes	S	C	FP	H	VPK	KDS	Other	Left	Right
Björklinge	88.7	1.3	1,509	45.5	32.2	11.7	7.1	1.1	2.5	0.0	46.6	51.0
Bälinge	89.1	1.8	2,119	32.1	49.0	7.4	8.4	1.8	1.2	0.0	34.0	64.8
Dannemora	92.6	2.1	2,403	58.9	19.9	7.6	5.6	4.6	3.4	0.0	63.5	33.1
Enköping	87.2	8.1	9,465	59.4	12.5	14.6	10.3	1.8	1.5	0.0	61.1	37.4
Håbo	88.9	1.8	2,107	52.7	19.5	14.3	11.5	0.9	1.0	0.0	53.6	45.4
Hållnäs	89.3	1.0	1,200	42.8	29.6	19.0	3.6	0.2	4.7	0.0	43.1	52.2
Lagunda	86.7	1.3	1,565	36.0	39.2	7.3	13.9	0.5	3.1	0.0	36.5	60.4
Norra Hagunda	89.6	1.2	1,352	37.8	36.6	12.9	10.4	1.1	1.2	0.0	38.9	59.9
Norra Trögd	91.0	1.3	1,547	37.0	38.2	7.4	15.4	0.6	1.4	0.0	37.6	61.0
Oland	88.2	4.2	4,877	46.8	31.8	7.8	10.3	1.2	2.2	0.0	48.0	49.9
Söderfors	93.6	1.5	1,746	79.4	5.3	7.6	3.9	1.8	1.9	0.0	81.3	16.8
Södra Trögd	88.8	0.8	975	29.0	52.0	5.3	12.1	0.6	0.9	0.0	29.6	69.4
Tierp rural	86.6	1.7	2,028	44.2	39.4	7.0	5.9	1.2	2.4	0.0	45.4	52.2
Tierp town	92.1	2.3	2,707	62.0	16.5	10.6	7.7	1.0	2.1	0.0	63.0	34.9
Upplands-Bro	90.5	2.7	3,186	52.6	15.9	13.3	13.8	2.8	1.5	0.0	55.5	43.0
Uppsala	88.4	47.5	55,365	49.2	11.6	20.1	15.0	2.4	1.7	0.0	51.6	46.6
Vattholma	90.8	1.7	2,005	46.2	27.4	15.3	7.7	1.8	1.6	0.0	48.0	50.4
Vendel	91.1	2.3	2,729	56.0	22.7	10.8	7.1	0.7	2.8	0.0	56.7	40.6
Västland	94.2	1.4	1,626	62.2	23.8	5.7	2.3	0.6	5.4	0.0	62.9	31.8
Åsunda	88.6	1.4	1,643	36.9	42.6	8.2	11.3	0.2	0.9	0.0	37.1	62.1
Älvkarleby	92.4	5.3	6,228	79.9	7.9	6.5	2.8	2.3	0.6	0.0	82.2	17.2
Österlövsta	90.9	1.2	1,369	48.4	28.7	7.7	6.6	0.7	7.9	0.0	49.2	43.0
Postal vote		5.9	6,856	34.2	10.6	24.5	27.1	1.4	2.1	0.1	35.6	62.2
Total	89.1	2.4	116,607	50.8	17.0	15.8	12.6	1.9	1.9	0.0	52.7	45.4
Source:SCB

=== Värmland ===
Location	Turnout	Share	Votes	S	C	FP	H	VPK	KDS	Other	Left	Right
Arvika	90.3	5.3	9,611	57.0	11.9	17.1	8.9	4.7	0.4	0.0	61.7	37.9
Brunskog	84.3	1.4	2,495	37.2	30.9	13.1	16.8	1.5	0.4	0.0	38.7	60.9
Ed	91.7	1.1	1,927	69.2	16.0	5.7	4.3	3.7	1.1	0.0	72.9	26.0
Eda	92.0	2.1	3,784	64.0	16.2	8.0	6.6	4.3	0.8	0.0	68.3	30.8
Ekshärad	91.0	1.8	3,348	54.6	27.9	2.6	7.6	5.0	2.3	0.0	59.6	38.1
Filipstad	89.0	2.5	4,499	60.2	10.7	11.2	12.6	4.7	0.6	0.0	64.9	34.5
Finnskoga-Dalby	88.1	1.6	2,974	63.1	12.8	4.9	8.6	10.2	0.4	0.0	73.3	26.3
Forshaga	92.6	1.6	2,923	71.0	9.1	9.2	6.6	2.7	1.3	0.0	73.7	24.9
Frykerud	87.6	0.6	1,020	25.3	38.7	14.3	19.8	0.7	1.2	0.0	26.0	72.8
Gillberga	89.4	0.8	1,428	35.7	42.8	4.1	15.2	1.1	1.2	0.0	36.8	62.0
Glava	89.6	0.6	1,097	58.5	23.3	7.3	5.3	5.5	0.1	0.0	64.0	35.9
Grava	92.3	1.0	1,828	50.4	20.8	12.1	12.2	3.0	1.5	0.0	53.4	45.1
Grums	90.4	2.0	3,715	68.1	15.3	7.3	5.2	3.4	0.7	0.0	71.4	27.9
Gräsmark	86.2	0.6	1,121	40.9	31.4	8.9	16.1	1.5	1.2	0.0	42.4	56.4
Gunnarskog	90.7	1.1	1,963	45.3	29.7	9.6	12.4	2.1	0.8	0.0	47.5	51.8
Gustav Adolf	92.9	0.3	563	77.8	9.8	2.7	2.7	6.7	0.4	0.0	84.5	15.1
Hagfors	94.5	3.0	5,457	75.6	6.1	4.8	5.2	8.0	0.2	0.0	83.6	16.1
Hammarö	92.6	3.4	6,267	72.1	9.1	8.0	6.3	4.3	0.2	0.0	76.4	23.4
Holmedal	79.7	1.1	2,051	31.0	36.8	11.9	15.8	0.6	3.0	0.0	31.6	64.5
Järnskog	86.5	0.9	1,573	48.1	26.4	10.6	12.6	0.8	1.5	0.0	48.8	49.7
Karlstad	90.1	16.9	30,697	54.7	11.9	14.3	16.3	2.1	0.7	0.0	56.8	42.5
Kristinehamn	89.7	7.0	12,710	59.1	11.8	13.3	12.4	2.6	0.8	0.0	61.6	37.6
Kroppa	92.9	0.8	1,368	82.5	5.6	4.1	3.0	4.6	0.2	0.0	87.1	12.7
Köla	87.3	0.6	1,016	49.3	33.6	4.6	9.6	1.7	1.2	0.0	51.0	47.8
Lysvik	90.6	0.8	1,430	38.6	41.5	7.4	11.2	1.0	0.3	0.0	39.6	60.1
Munkfors	94.3	2.1	3,887	75.7	8.5	7.4	4.5	3.3	0.7	0.0	79.0	20.3
Nor	90.3	1.9	3,389	63.9	16.5	7.5	7.6	3.8	0.6	0.0	68.7	31.6
Norra Ny	91.5	0.9	1,563	47.3	25.7	5.4	14.5	6.3	0.8	0.0	53.6	45.7
Norra Råda	92.3	1.8	3,283	66.3	10.1	7.5	6.2	9.5	0.5	0.0	75.8	23.8
Nyed	91.8	1.8	3,327	46.2	29.8	9.0	10.9	2.1	2.0	0.0	48.4	49.7
Rämmen	92.6	1.0	1,796	78.0	7.5	7.9	2.7	3.9	0.0	0.0	81.8	18.2
Sillerud	76.8	0.5	898	29.5	42.2	9.5	14.9	3.0	0.9	0.0	32.5	66.6
Stavnäs	89.5	0.9	1,620	39.3	29.2	13.4	15.5	1.8	0.8	0.0	41.1	58.1
Stora Kil	89.2	1.8	3,209	51.5	20.8	14.1	9.3	3.2	0.9	0.1	54.7	44.2
Storfors	92.2	1.8	3,359	67.2	15.3	6.4	8.0	2.2	0.9	0.0	69.4	29.7
Sunne	89.6	3.8	6,828	39.4	31.5	10.8	16.5	1.0	0.8	0.0	40.4	58.8
Svanskog	85.8	0.8	1,546	39.1	36.4	6.4	14.2	1.9	2.1	0.0	40.9	57.0
Säffle	90.3	4.1	7,443	51.6	22.0	12.1	9.8	2.8	1.7	0.0	54.5	43.8
Torsby	88.1	3.0	5,398	47.6	22.4	7.3	11.7	9.8	1.2	0.0	57.3	41.4
Töcksmark	83.9	0.8	1,472	35.7	23.1	22.3	15.7	0.6	2.6	0.0	36.3	61.1
Ullerud	92.2	1.7	3,094	65.9	19.3	5.4	5.5	3.3	0.6	0.0	69.2	30.2
Visnum	91.9	1.8	3,230	51.0	28.7	7.7	8.4	3.1	1.1	0.0	54.1	44.8
Värmlandsberg	89.0	1.3	2,435	67.9	14.7	6.2	5.0	5.5	0.7	0.0	73.3	26.0
Värmlandsnäs	87.7	0.9	1,623	26.6	53.6	7.2	11.0	0.9	0.7	0.0	27.5	71.8
Väse	91.5	1.1	2,045	32.6	41.3	10.0	14.3	0.9	0.8	0.0	33.5	65.6
Årjäng	85.3	0.9	1,625	37.7	28.7	14.3	15.8	0.7	2.8	0.0	38.4	58.8
Älgå	88.5	0.7	1,357	57.7	19.2	8.3	9.5	5.0	0.2	0.0	62.7	37.1
Östmark	89.0	0.7	1,322	47.5	24.4	4.8	19.1	3.9	0.3	0.0	51.4	48.3
Postal vote		5.2	9,450	44.1	14.6	18.3	19.6	2.1	1.1	0.3	46.2	52.5
Total	90.1	3.8	182,064	55.2	18.2	10.8	11.5	3.4	0.9	0.0	58.6	40.5
Source:SCB

=== Västerbotten ===
Location	Turnout	Share	Votes	S	C	FP	H	VPK	KDS	Other	Left	Right
Bjurholm	92.1	1.8	2,518	35.9	22.9	22.1	16.0	0.6	2.5	0.0	36.5	61.0
Burträsk	87.4	2.9	4,205	32.3	40.7	14.1	10.5	0.7	1.7	0.0	33.0	65.3
Bygdeå	92.6	2.3	3,344	39.7	35.3	15.8	5.1	0.6	3.4	0.0	40.3	56.2
Degerfors	89.5	3.4	4,882	38.0	26.0	20.8	11.3	0.3	3.6	0.0	38.3	58.1
Dorotea	90.7	1.8	2,608	63.3	14.7	14.8	3.5	2.6	1.2	0.0	65.9	32.9
Fredrika	90.1	0.5	777	59.6	19.6	12.0	6.0	0.8	2.1	0.0	60.4	37.6
Holmsund	92.9	2.5	3,558	74.9	4.9	12.9	2.9	3.5	0.8	0.0	78.5	20.8
Holmön	81.8	0.1	112	28.6	17.0	40.2	14.3	0.0	0.0	0.0	28.6	71.4
Hörnefors	91.6	1.4	2,064	69.4	15.6	8.6	3.8	0.8	1.7	0.0	70.2	28.1
Lycksele city	88.8	2.3	3,352	53.3	9.6	16.1	11.5	1.0	5.5	0.0	54.2	40.2
Lycksele rural	89.0	3.1	4,354	50.5	11.6	20.5	6.2	2.1	9.1	0.0	52.6	38.2
Lövånger	89.0	1.4	2,050	19.8	36.6	18.0	20.4	0.5	4.6	0.0	20.3	75.1
Malå	87.6	1.8	2,573	56.9	12.6	17.4	6.2	3.4	3.5	0.0	60.2	36.2
Nordmaling	91.7	3.7	5,280	46.5	24.3	13.4	11.8	0.5	3.5	0.0	47.0	49.5
Norsjö	85.8	2.5	3,622	46.3	20.3	17.7	8.4	4.2	3.0	0.0	50.6	46.4
Nysätra	88.8	1.2	1,699	23.7	39.1	20.5	13.8	0.5	2.4	0.0	24.2	73.5
Skellefteå	88.6	25.0	35,609	57.4	16.8	11.6	9.0	2.0	3.2	0.0	59.4	37.3
Sorsele	85.0	1.8	2,599	45.7	16.4	23.0	5.0	3.5	6.4	0.0	49.2	44.4
Stensele	88.6	2.7	3,898	46.7	15.8	20.5	6.8	2.0	8.2	0.0	48.7	43.1
Sävar	90.5	1.4	1,975	32.2	35.5	18.3	10.8	0.4	2.8	0.0	32.5	64.6
Tärna	81.5	0.8	1,110	39.5	16.9	25.0	14.4	1.0	3.2	0.0	40.5	56.3
Umeå	89.0	20.2	28,836	45.9	20.7	19.8	11.0	1.1	1.6	0.0	46.9	51.5
Vilhelmina	88.5	3.7	5,271	53.7	19.0	15.5	6.0	1.3	4.4	0.0	55.1	40.5
Vännäs rural	88.4	1.7	2,363	25.8	42.8	14.4	13.8	0.5	2.8	0.0	26.2	71.0
Vännäs town	89.5	1.5	2,169	63.3	13.0	12.1	7.0	2.2	2.5	0.0	65.5	32.0
Åsele	88.3	2.0	2,784	56.8	18.5	15.6	5.5	0.7	3.0	0.0	57.4	39.6
Örträsk	89.0	0.4	578	42.7	32.5	13.3	6.4	0.5	4.5	0.0	43.3	52.2
Postal vote		6.0	8,506	45.8	14.7	20.9	13.5	1.3	3.7	0.1	47.1	49.1
Total	89.0	3.0	142,696	49.3	20.0	16.5	9.5	1.5	3.2	0.0	50.8	45.9
Source:SCB

=== Västernorrland ===
Location	Turnout	Share	Votes	S	C	FP	H	VPK	KDS	Other	Left	Right
Anundsjö	91.1	2.8	4,984	48.1	33.1	9.0	4.5	2.0	3.4	0.0	50.1	46.5
Bjärtrå	91.4	1.1	1,890	66.3	18.6	3.1	3.3	7.3	1.4	0.0	73.6	25.0
Björna	91.3	0.9	1,573	50.2	24.9	11.6	6.0	3.0	4.3	0.0	53.1	42.5
Borgsjö	88.2	1.1	1,943	56.3	26.4	5.1	3.8	6.4	2.1	0.0	62.7	35.3
Boteå	92.6	1.0	1,718	59.4	26.3	1.6	4.8	5.7	2.2	0.0	65.1	32.7
Fjällsjö	90.0	2.3	4,002	58.0	25.1	3.0	5.1	7.4	1.3	0.0	65.4	33.3
Gideå	86.6	0.6	1,061	32.6	43.7	12.5	4.1	1.1	5.8	0.0	33.7	60.4
Grundsunda	90.2	1.5	2,666	59.5	20.0	8.5	4.2	4.2	3.7	0.0	63.6	32.7
Haverö	88.3	0.7	1,204	61.3	17.0	6.6	2.1	11.3	1.7	0.0	72.6	25.7
Helgum	92.6	0.6	971	56.4	32.5	1.2	4.6	3.8	1.3	0.0	60.2	38.4
Härnösand	89.0	5.4	9,499	49.7	17.0	12.0	16.7	2.6	1.8	0.0	52.2	46.0
Hässjö	88.9	1.7	2,954	52.0	27.2	7.0	5.8	5.7	2.4	0.0	57.7	39.9
Högsjö	94.0	1.1	1,868	64.6	21.3	2.0	3.6	7.5	1.0	0.0	72.1	26.9
Indals-Liden	88.7	1.4	2,515	50.3	31.3	7.3	6.1	2.2	2.7	0.0	52.6	44.7
Junsele	88.5	1.0	1,791	55.7	21.8	3.1	8.0	9.4	2.1	0.0	65.0	32.8
Kramfors	93.5	4.4	7,698	66.9	12.2	3.0	4.1	12.8	0.8	0.0	79.8	19.4
Långsele	91.7	1.6	2,850	71.2	17.2	2.2	3.7	4.8	0.8	0.0	76.0	23.2
Matfors	88.7	2.3	4,003	51.8	30.8	7.6	4.0	3.7	2.0	0.0	55.6	42.4
Njurunda	89.8	4.2	7,411	63.2	14.4	8.5	3.6	8.8	1.5	0.0	71.9	26.6
Noraström	91.2	1.0	1,676	39.4	39.6	4.5	8.7	5.7	2.0	0.0	45.1	52.9
Nordingrå	94.2	0.9	1,661	41.9	37.0	4.5	10.7	0.4	5.5	0.0	42.3	52.1
Nätra	90.9	2.6	4,590	58.9	23.0	6.6	5.2	3.3	3.0	0.0	62.2	34.8
Ramsele	91.6	1.6	2,761	58.9	25.1	2.5	6.3	5.0	2.2	0.0	64.0	33.8
Resele	91.4	0.9	1,541	58.6	28.6	1.8	3.4	6.2	1.4	0.0	64.8	33.8
Själevad	91.8	6.4	11,202	62.1	16.4	8.5	5.2	3.0	4.9	0.0	65.1	30.0
Sollefteå	91.5	3.2	5,627	56.0	22.1	6.5	12.4	1.7	1.3	0.0	57.7	41.0
Stöde	88.2	1.2	2,116	51.4	29.2	7.6	4.4	4.6	2.9	0.0	56.0	41.2
Sundsvall	88.6	20.0	35,179	57.2	14.6	12.3	9.8	4.1	2.0	0.0	61.2	36.8
Säbrå	88.4	2.6	4,507	47.4	34.8	4.6	7.6	3.1	2.5	0.0	50.5	47.0
Timrå	91.7	4.2	7,386	72.4	10.8	6.3	3.0	5.4	2.1	0.0	77.8	20.2
Torp	87.1	2.4	4,200	55.6	26.5	6.3	3.8	5.4	2.4	0.0	61.0	36.6
Trehörningsjö	85.6	0.4	648	41.8	32.4	9.9	7.6	1.4	6.9	0.0	43.2	49.8
Ullånger	92.0	1.0	1,785	38.3	41.8	6.7	8.0	0.7	4.4	0.0	39.0	56.5
Ytterlännäs	92.3	2.6	4,566	65.2	18.4	3.1	5.3	6.2	1.8	0.0	71.4	26.7
Ådals-Liden	89.3	0.8	1,368	60.6	22.8	3.7	7.0	4.7	1.2	0.0	65.3	33.6
Ånge	90.7	1.2	2,166	69.2	11.0	9.1	5.4	3.7	1.7	0.0	72.9	25.4
Örnsköldsvik	89.3	5.4	9,480	49.9	18.1	15.0	10.8	2.7	3.5	0.0	52.6	43.9
Postal vote		6.1	10,747	50.3	15.9	14.7	14.0	2.7	2.2	0.1	53.0	44.7
Total	90.1	3.6	175,807	56.8	20.0	8.6	7.7	4.6	2.4	0.0	61.4	36.3
Source:SCB

=== Västmanland ===
Location	Turnout	Share	Votes	S	C	FP	H	VPK	KDS	Other	Left	Right
Arboga	90.1	4.8	7,003	62.3	12.0	13.9	8.1	2.7	1.1	0.0	65.0	33.9
Fagersta	91.4	6.2	8,950	70.8	8.8	10.7	6.1	3.0	0.7	0.0	73.8	25.5
Fjärdhundra	86.1	1.4	2,063	31.1	48.5	8.3	10.5	0.7	0.8	0.0	31.8	67.3
Hallstahammar	91.8	5.0	7,347	70.1	8.1	10.2	5.8	4.7	1.0	0.0	74.9	24.1
Kolbäck	89.9	1.9	2,735	59.8	17.9	10.7	8.2	3.0	0.4	0.0	62.8	36.8
Kolsva	93.3	1.7	2,445	72.0	13.9	5.7	3.8	3.4	1.2	0.0	75.3	23.5
Kung Karl	87.0	0.9	1,328	37.3	38.4	12.3	9.6	1.4	1.1	0.0	38.6	60.2
Kungsör	92.2	2.3	3,296	61.9	7.5	19.8	5.3	4.6	1.0	0.0	66.5	32.6
Köping	88.6	7.3	10,648	65.5	9.6	12.2	7.5	2.9	2.3	0.0	68.4	29.3
Medåker	88.5	0.9	1,348	33.0	51.3	6.2	6.7	1.0	1.9	0.0	34.0	64.2
Munktorp	88.7	1.0	1,415	29.7	50.6	9.3	8.7	0.7	1.0	0.0	30.4	68.6
Möklinta	89.1	0.7	1,004	30.1	52.9	6.9	8.2	0.5	1.5	0.0	30.6	67.9
Nora	87.9	1.0	1,472	45.9	33.8	13.2	4.6	0.9	1.6	0.0	46.8	51.6
Norberg	89.3	2.4	3,500	72.6	9.1	7.1	6.5	3.5	1.1	0.0	76.1	22.8
Sala	88.5	4.7	6,872	54.6	17.3	15.2	9.4	2.2	1.2	0.0	56.8	41.9
Skinnskatteberg	89.2	2.1	3,072	68.6	15.7	6.8	4.9	3.0	1.0	0.0	71.5	27.4
Surahammar	93.4	3.9	5,665	72.4	9.5	6.9	4.8	5.3	1.0	0.0	77.7	21.2
Tärna	88.8	1.3	1,940	25.7	54.6	8.9	9.3	0.5	1.0	0.0	26.1	72.8
Vittinge	90.1	1.0	1,477	58.4	19.6	10.0	4.5	5.3	2.4	0.0	63.6	34.0
Västerfärnebo	88.3	1.7	2,460	30.3	48.1	11.7	7.2	0.9	1.7	0.0	31.2	67.1
Västerlövsta	86.1	1.9	2,779	48.8	30.5	10.7	5.7	3.5	0.8	0.0	52.3	46.9
Västerås	88.2	39.2	57,058	58.2	11.5	16.8	9.3	2.9	1.3	0.0	61.1	37.6
Östervåla	87.7	1.6	2,400	39.3	40.7	8.5	8.9	1.0	1.6	0.0	40.3	58.1
Postal vote		5.0	7,245	44.8	10.7	22.6	18.2	2.0	1.6	0.1	46.8	51.4
Total	89.1	3.0	145,522	58.2	15.4	13.8	8.4	2.9	1.3	0.0	61.0	37.7
Source:SCB

=== Västra Götaland ===
The later iteration of Västra Götaland County was divided into three separate counties and five constituencies in 1973. The three counties were Gothenburg and Bohuslän, Skaraborg and Älvsborg. Gothenburg/Bohus were divided into one constituency representing Gothenburg Municipality and one representing Bohuslän, whereas Älvsborg was divided into two constituencies, one in the north and one in the south. Skaraborg had one constituency for the whole county.

==== Bohuslän ====
Location	Turnout	Share	Votes	S	C	FP	H	VPK	KDS	Other	Left	Right
Askim	92.5	2.7	3,844	25.9	8.5	36.0	27.9	0.7	1.0	0.0	26.6	72.4
Bullaren	80.1	0.8	1,109	21.0	43.5	15.8	18.4	0.5	0.9	0.0	21.5	77.6
Forshälla	89.2	0.7	963	30.5	35.6	12.8	19.9	0.7	0.4	0.0	31.3	68.3
Hermansby	90.8	1.0	1,403	24.2	43.4	14.1	17.2	0.8	0.2	0.0	25.0	74.8
Inlands Torpe	88.7	1.4	2,009	54.0	27.1	8.5	8.3	1.3	0.8	0.0	55.3	43.9
Kode	88.1	1.5	2,076	23.1	32.7	15.0	28.0	0.7	0.5	0.0	23.8	75.7
Kungälv	91.7	4.3	6,092	50.0	8.3	22.6	15.7	2.2	1.2	0.0	52.2	46.6
Kville	84.9	1.8	2,534	31.3	34.6	21.7	11.2	0.4	0.9	0.0	31.6	67.5
Kållered	93.2	1.1	1,603	38.1	14.8	33.1	11.7	1.2	1.0	0.0	39.3	59.7
Landvetter	88.0	1.6	2,210	39.0	20.5	25.2	12.9	1.9	0.5	0.0	40.9	58.6
Lane-Ryr	82.6	0.4	612	22.2	49.0	12.9	15.4	0.3	0.2	0.0	22.5	77.3
Ljungskile	88.8	1.3	1,863	39.7	14.2	19.6	24.8	1.1	0.7	0.0	40.7	58.6
Lysekil	92.2	3.5	4,884	63.8	6.7	14.9	11.8	2.1	0.6	0.0	65.9	33.5
Marstrand	84.9	0.4	625	41.6	6.2	35.4	13.3	1.1	2.4	0.0	42.7	54.9
Morlanda	79.4	1.2	1,655	35.7	12.9	35.0	14.8	0.5	1.0	0.1	36.3	62.7
Munkedal	89.4	2.1	3,033	58.1	21.0	10.0	8.5	1.6	0.9	0.0	59.6	39.5
Mölndal	89.3	12.0	16,999	51.6	6.5	25.5	10.5	5.0	1.0	0.0	56.6	42.5
Partille	91.6	8.2	11,589	44.2	6.5	30.4	13.3	4.3	1.3	0.0	48.5	50.2
Romelanda	89.0	1.1	1,588	33.4	34.3	16.1	13.6	1.4	1.1	0.0	34.9	64.0
Råda	93.7	2.4	3,416	49.7	5.9	26.4	13.2	3.7	1.0	0.0	53.5	45.5
Skaftö	83.0	1.1	1,492	27.9	22.1	30.9	17.7	0.4	0.9	0.0	28.4	70.7
Skredsvik	90.8	1.6	2,317	39.9	29.7	17.7	11.3	1.3	0.0	0.0	41.2	58.8
Smögen	85.0	0.7	935	25.5	5.9	49.3	17.5	0.7	1.1	0.0	26.2	72.7
Stenungsund	89.4	3.4	4,816	42.5	21.4	20.2	13.8	1.6	0.5	0.0	44.1	55.4
Strömstad	85.4	4.1	5,855	47.0	21.4	18.4	11.2	0.9	1.1	0.0	47.9	51.0
Styrsö	86.8	1.1	1,550	16.0	6.6	51.7	18.8	0.3	6.6	0.0	16.3	77.1
Stångenäs	90.7	1.8	2,565	56.7	15.9	12.7	12.2	1.4	1.2	0.0	58.1	40.7
Svarteborg	86.2	1.2	1,676	30.0	33.1	17.8	16.4	1.3	1.4	0.0	31.2	67.4
Södra Sotenäs	87.2	2.1	2,924	54.1	10.7	25.4	7.6	1.5	0.6	0.0	55.6	43.7
Sörbygden	87.4	0.9	1,312	15.2	46.2	11.0	26.8	0.2	0.7	0.0	15.4	83.9
Tanum	86.9	2.2	3,076	30.3	30.4	18.0	20.4	0.2	0.7	0.0	30.5	68.8
Tjörn	80.9	3.3	4,731	20.9	13.3	44.9	16.9	0.4	3.6	0.0	21.2	75.2
Tossene	88.2	1.5	2,075	61.5	10.7	16.0	9.9	1.5	0.3	0.0	63.0	36.6
Uddevalla	87.6	13.9	19,624	57.9	11.7	16.7	11.2	2.0	0.5	0.0	59.9	39.6
Ytterby	94.0	1.1	1,549	51.2	15.8	14.1	16.7	1.5	0.7	0.0	52.7	46.5
Öckerö	85.4	3.0	4,300	24.8	2.9	41.6	24.9	0.5	5.3	0.0	25.3	69.4
Östra Orust	83.1	2.5	3,508	28.4	34.1	20.2	16.8	0.2	0.3	0.0	28.6	71.1
Postal vote		5.0	7,132	31.6	9.5	31.4	24.8	1.5	1.0	0.2	33.2	65.6
Total	88.3	2.9	141,544	43.5	14.9	23.7	14.7	2.0	1.1	0.0	45.5	53.4
Source:SCB

==== Gothenburg ====
Location	Turnout	Share	Votes	S	C	FP	H	VPK	KDS	Other	Left	Right
Gothenburg	86.4	100.0	270,614	46.5	4.6	30.8	12.0	5.4	0.7	0.0	51.9	47.4
Total	86.4	5.6	270,614	46.5	4.6	30.8	12.0	5.4	0.7	0.0	51.9	47.4
Source:SCB

==== Skaraborg ====
Location	Turnout	Share	Votes	S	C	FP	H	VPK	KDS	Other	Left	Right
Amnehärad	88.5	1.2	1,933	50.4	29.1	11.0	7.1	1.0	1.4	0.0	51.4	47.2
Ardala	88.3	1.0	1,553	23.8	46.9	8.2	20.0	0.4	0.7	0.0	24.2	75.1
Binneberg	89.9	1.1	1,711	29.6	42.4	7.3	16.9	1.2	2.6	0.0	30.8	66.6
Dimbo	89.4	1.0	1,535	28.0	44.1	8.0	18.2	0.7	1.0	0.0	28.7	70.3
Essunga	89.8	2.3	3,657	19.0	40.0	12.5	27.3	0.2	1.1	0.0	19.1	79.7
Falköping	89.7	6.1	9,664	47.0	16.7	16.9	15.6	1.0	2.7	0.0	48.1	49.2
Fröjered	90.9	0.7	1,086	31.7	41.9	8.1	15.0	0.3	3.0	0.0	32.0	65.0
Frökind	91.8	0.8	1,239	14.5	48.9	9.5	24.9	0.1	2.0	0.0	14.6	83.4
Fågelås	88.5	0.7	1,153	37.0	27.8	6.5	21.9	0.7	6.2	0.0	37.7	56.1
Grästorp	88.8	2.2	3,411	24.4	39.0	14.0	21.6	0.4	0.6	0.0	24.7	74.6
Gudhem	90.5	0.9	1,490	30.8	41.9	7.9	16.2	0.3	2.8	0.0	31.1	66.0
Götene	90.0	4.7	7,380	41.2	22.8	16.8	14.4	1.2	3.6	0.0	42.4	54.0
Habo	91.1	1.8	2,879	33.9	27.8	17.4	14.9	0.4	5.6	0.0	34.2	60.2
Hasslerör	87.5	0.7	1,120	36.3	32.8	9.5	17.6	1.0	2.9	0.0	37.3	59.8
Hjo	90.3	1.9	2,970	45.9	18.5	14.9	16.0	1.0	3.6	0.0	47.0	49.4
Hova	87.0	1.6	2,481	33.5	34.9	10.5	17.7	0.5	3.0	0.0	34.0	63.0
Hökensås	89.0	1.1	1,660	33.6	42.2	10.1	12.3	0.6	1.3	0.0	34.2	64.6
Järpås	90.5	0.6	1,020	31.1	40.4	9.6	17.5	1.1	0.4	0.0	32.2	67.5
Karlsborg	92.7	1.6	2,469	50.5	12.2	20.4	13.9	0.5	2.6	0.0	51.0	46.5
Kvänum	90.4	1.6	2,532	24.1	41.5	11.9	21.4	0.3	0.8	0.0	24.4	74.8
Kållands-Råda	89.3	0.7	1,045	35.8	32.9	14.8	14.5	1.0	1.0	0.0	36.7	62.3
Larv	89.7	0.9	1,447	23.8	39.0	11.5	23.6	0.1	1.7	0.1	24.0	74.2
Lidköping	87.8	7.2	11,396	55.7	9.9	19.1	10.9	3.9	1.4	0.0	59.7	39.0
Lugnås	85.4	0.6	919	33.9	33.7	13.7	12.5	0.7	5.4	0.0	34.6	60.0
Lyrestad	87.4	0.7	1,137	42.6	31.7	10.6	11.5	0.7	2.9	0.0	43.3	53.8
Mariestad	90.5	5.5	8,733	51.5	13.5	16.9	14.1	2.0	2.0	0.0	53.5	44.5
Moholm	90.1	1.2	1,957	36.9	37.4	8.1	15.7	1.1	0.8	0.0	38.0	61.2
Mullsjö	92.1	1.5	2,429	32.5	26.8	21.5	13.9	0.0	5.3	0.0	32.5	62.2
Mölltorp	90.5	1.4	2,160	40.6	36.4	10.0	9.8	1.2	2.0	0.0	41.8	56.3
Norra Kålland	87.7	1.3	2,008	30.5	35.4	19.3	9.7	1.2	3.8	0.0	31.8	64.4
Saleby	86.2	0.5	847	14.4	51.4	5.2	28.8	0.0	0.2	0.0	14.4	85.4
Skara	90.9	3.9	6,222	49.3	16.0	16.5	16.2	1.0	1.0	0.0	50.3	48.7
Skultorp	91.4	1.3	2,096	39.6	27.9	15.4	13.2	1.6	2.3	0.0	41.2	56.5
Skövde	88.7	9.7	15,221	49.4	13.8	19.1	13.8	2.4	1.4	0.0	51.8	46.7
Stenstorp	90.7	1.4	2,148	32.1	36.4	10.7	19.5	0.5	0.8	0.0	32.6	66.6
Tibro	90.4	3.1	4,896	46.3	21.0	16.3	11.5	1.1	3.7	0.0	47.4	48.9
Tidaholm	91.7	2.9	4,565	62.8	11.1	12.0	9.1	3.3	1.7	0.0	66.0	32.3
Tidan	91.9	0.8	1,224	40.5	38.3	8.1	10.6	0.6	2.0	0.0	41.0	57.0
Timmersdala	89.4	0.8	1,236	36.5	27.5	14.6	19.0	0.7	1.7	0.0	37.2	61.1
Tun	88.6	0.6	891	33.1	24.7	26.6	14.0	0.7	0.9	0.0	33.8	65.3
Töreboda	88.9	2.2	3,540	39.0	30.8	13.1	14.6	1.5	1.1	0.0	40.5	58.4
Ullervad	88.6	0.9	1,488	29.5	41.6	6.7	19.1	1.1	2.1	0.0	30.6	67.3
Undenäs	90.9	1.2	1,932	49.4	30.1	8.8	9.0	0.8	2.0	0.0	50.2	47.8
Valle	88.3	1.3	2,120	36.9	33.3	10.1	17.4	0.4	2.0	0.0	37.3	60.7
Vara	88.9	4.4	6,928	24.7	34.0	12.8	26.2	0.9	1.4	0.0	25.7	72.9
Vartofta	91.3	1.2	1,932	21.2	50.0	8.2	18.9	0.4	1.3	0.0	21.6	77.1
Vilske	90.1	2.0	3,090	21.2	40.6	11.3	24.1	0.3	2.6	0.0	21.5	76.0
Vinninga	87.3	1.0	1,555	33.3	41.2	11.3	13.4	0.6	0.1	0.0	34.0	65.9
Värsås	89.6	1.2	1,899	25.5	46.9	8.2	17.2	0.6	1.6	0.0	26.1	72.3
Örslösa	86.6	0.7	1,170	18.8	44.1	12.1	20.3	0.4	4.2	0.0	19.2	76.6
Postal vote		4.1	6,403	29.6	16.7	23.4	26.5	1.3	2.4	0.1	31.0	66.6
Total	89.6	3.3	157,577	39.7	25.9	14.8	16.2	1.3	2.1	0.0	41.0	56.9
Source:SCB

==== Älvsborg N ====
Location	Turnout	Share	Votes	S	C	FP	H	VPK	KDS	Other	Left	Right
Alingsås	89.4	8.9	11,380	48.9	12.0	24.6	10.8	1.5	2.2	0.0	50.4	47.4
Bengtsfors	88.6	1.6	2,040	50.5	18.2	18.4	10.1	0.8	2.0	0.0	51.3	46.7
Bjärke	86.8	2.2	2,887	21.5	36.0	24.4	14.2	0.5	3.4	0.0	22.0	74.6
Bolstad	89.7	1.0	1,305	12.2	69.4	5.6	9.7	0.1	3.0	0.0	12.3	84.8
Brålanda	88.9	1.7	2,172	15.7	55.0	5.8	17.6	0.2	5.6	0.0	16.0	78.5
Bäckefors	85.9	0.7	907	41.5	28.2	13.9	15.0	0.4	1.0	0.0	41.9	57.1
Dals-Ed	85.4	2.4	3,019	29.3	38.8	12.2	13.9	0.7	5.0	0.0	30.0	65.0
Flundre	89.2	1.8	2,329	51.2	28.1	10.0	6.3	3.4	1.0	0.0	54.6	44.4
Frändefors	88.9	1.3	1,693	17.3	48.0	11.2	20.9	0.3	2.4	0.0	17.6	80.0
Färgelanda	91.4	1.9	2,424	48.9	29.6	6.6	14.3	0.2	0.3	0.0	49.2	50.5
Gäsene	91.0	2.4	3,127	21.2	37.4	11.8	27.2	0.5	1.8	0.0	21.7	76.5
Hemsjö	89.2	1.0	1,223	30.7	22.3	23.2	21.1	1.0	1.6	0.0	31.7	66.6
Herrljunga	92.6	2.1	2,671	36.3	25.8	21.5	14.6	0.7	1.1	0.0	37.0	61.8
Högsäter	84.4	1.3	1,636	12.9	62.5	8.6	14.2	0.2	1.7	0.0	13.1	85.2
Kroppefjäll	86.7	1.2	1,529	18.5	50.8	10.8	16.5	0.2	3.3	0.0	18.7	78.0
Lelång	84.7	1.5	1,884	31.7	40.2	9.9	13.1	0.9	4.2	0.0	32.6	63.1
Lerum	92.0	4.5	5,838	37.6	11.2	31.6	17.8	1.4	0.4	0.0	39.0	60.6
Lilla Edet	90.6	1.5	1,942	67.9	5.6	16.9	4.6	3.3	1.5	0.0	71.3	27.2
Lödöse	89.6	1.1	1,388	41.9	35.3	10.0	10.0	1.6	1.2	0.0	43.4	55.3
Mellerud	88.7	2.0	2,619	44.9	22.9	16.1	13.6	0.6	1.9	0.0	45.5	52.7
Nödinge	90.5	3.1	3,972	67.2	7.2	16.2	5.3	3.0	1.1	0.0	70.2	28.7
Skallsjö	91.0	2.0	2,534	48.9	10.1	26.5	11.2	1.9	1.3	0.0	50.8	47.8
Skepplanda	86.8	1.0	1,343	30.8	46.7	9.0	10.3	1.6	1.6	0.0	32.4	66.0
Skållered	89.4	1.1	1,417	68.6	12.4	11.1	2.2	0.8	4.9	0.0	69.4	25.7
Starrkärr	89.2	2.7	3,463	50.9	20.3	15.5	7.2	3.1	2.9	0.0	54.1	43.0
Steneby	90.2	2.3	2,944	61.2	16.1	12.4	6.2	1.5	2.5	0.0	62.7	34.7
Stora Lundby	89.0	1.6	2,009	29.9	25.3	26.4	14.9	1.2	2.2	0.0	31.1	66.7
Trollhättan	89.0	18.3	23,440	59.7	11.4	18.4	6.8	2.6	1.1	0.0	62.4	36.5
Tössbo	87.1	2.0	2,539	39.9	32.8	11.5	12.8	1.7	1.4	0.0	41.5	57.1
Vårgårda	83.6	3.5	4,460	23.2	33.1	22.2	18.5	0.5	2.5	0.0	23.7	73.8
Vänersborg	87.5	9.0	11,518	51.3	12.4	21.6	11.5	1.6	1.5	0.0	52.9	45.6
Västra Tunhem	91.1	2.7	3,473	61.3	15.0	12.6	6.7	2.6	1.7	0.0	64.0	34.4
Åmål	88.1	4.3	5,566	57.6	10.6	17.3	11.8	1.2	1.5	0.0	58.8	39.7
Postal vote		4.4	5,694	33.9	13.3	29.1	20.9	0.9	1.9	0.0	34.8	63.3
Total	88.8	2.7	128,385	45.7	20.5	18.5	11.8	1.6	1.9	0.0	47.3	50.8
Source:SCB

==== Älvsborg S ====
Location	Turnout	Share	Votes	S	C	FP	H	VPK	KDS	Other	Left	Right
Axelfors	89.3	0.8	930	26.7	44.9	4.6	22.4	0.4	1.0	0.0	27.1	71.9
Björketorp	89.6	1.4	1,561	37.1	22.4	13.9	24.3	2.2	0.2	0.0	39.3	60.5
Bollebygd	92.2	2.7	3,016	41.4	24.0	8.4	24.3	0.8	1.0	0.0	42.2	56.8
Borås	90.4	34.9	38,999	52.2	9.7	14.3	20.0	3.0	0.8	0.0	55.2	44.0
Brämhult	95.3	1.4	1,611	29.9	14.7	17.7	36.4	0.8	0.6	0.0	30.7	68.8
Dalsjöfors	93.6	4.1	4,584	45.8	23.1	10.5	18.5	1.0	1.1	0.0	46.8	52.2
Dalstorp	94.3	1.7	1,950	28.3	43.6	9.5	18.0	0.4	0.3	0.0	28.6	71.1
Fristad	93.2	3.3	3,670	32.5	26.5	12.7	26.2	1.4	0.8	0.0	33.8	65.3
Fritsla	93.9	1.7	1,905	60.2	12.1	5.8	17.8	3.5	0.5	0.0	63.7	35.7
Horred	89.4	1.4	1,516	26.6	37.9	9.4	25.0	0.1	0.9	0.0	26.7	72.4
Högvad	91.9	1.3	1,426	26.2	36.8	12.6	23.3	0.3	0.8	0.0	26.5	72.7
Hökerum	93.3	1.7	1,880	15.1	42.9	11.0	29.9	0.5	0.6	0.0	15.6	83.8
Kindaholm	91.7	1.3	1,437	27.5	40.8	6.4	24.6	0.1	0.6	0.0	27.6	71.8
Kinna	94.9	3.6	3,990	60.4	10.4	10.5	15.4	2.7	0.6	0.0	63.1	36.3
Kungsäter	87.3	1.0	1,067	22.7	41.4	6.8	29.1	0.2	0.0	0.0	22.9	77.1
Lysjö	68.8	1.0	1,063	29.9	36.7	5.4	27.0	0.2	0.8	0.0	30.1	69.0
Redväg	91.5	3.7	4,081	16.8	40.5	16.7	22.6	0.3	3.1	0.0	17.1	79.8
Sandhult	93.3	3.4	3,843	39.2	24.0	11.8	22.8	1.4	0.7	0.0	40.7	58.6
Skene	93.1	2.4	2,706	64.3	11.5	6.7	12.4	4.1	1.1	0.0	68.4	30.6
Svansjö	93.4	1.4	1,507	21.8	49.0	3.3	25.3	0.1	0.5	0.0	21.9	77.6
Svenljunga	92.1	1.6	1,778	48.2	19.5	8.1	23.1	0.7	0.4	0.0	48.9	50.7
Sätila	90.0	1.8	2,007	27.6	36.3	5.4	29.5	0.6	0.6	0.0	28.2	71.2
Tranemo	93.1	4.3	4,827	43.3	29.2	8.8	17.7	0.6	0.3	0.0	44.0	55.7
Ulricehamn	91.2	4.6	5,085	41.6	14.0	19.9	22.4	0.7	1.4	0.0	42.3	56.3
Viskafors	94.0	3.2	3,547	63.6	21.1	3.4	10.4	1.2	0.3	0.0	64.8	34.8
Västra Mark	91.3	1.8	2,031	25.9	41.7	3.5	27.1	0.1	1.6	0.0	26.1	72.3
Åsunden	94.3	2.7	3,022	32.4	36.4	10.0	20.5	0.2	0.5	0.0	32.6	66.9
Örby	92.9	1.7	1,898	59.0	15.7	6.5	16.1	1.6	1.1	0.0	60.6	38.3
Postal vote		4.2	4,684	33.2	11.8	21.3	31.4	1.2	0.9	0.0	34.4	64.6
Total	91.5	2.3	111,621	43.6	20.4	12.1	21.4	1.8	0.9	0.0	45.3	53.8
Source:SCB

=== Örebro ===
Location	Turnout	Share	Votes	S	C	FP	H	VPK	KDS	Other	Left	Right
Asker	89.9	1.5	2,463	39.8	32.4	14.6	5.8	0.9	6.5	0.0	40.7	52.8
Askersund	88.2	1.4	2,438	46.1	23.8	13.6	11.6	0.7	4.2	0.0	46.9	48.9
Axberg	91.0	2.0	3,398	36.3	26.6	19.1	15.1	0.9	2.1	0.0	37.1	60.8
Degerfors	93.4	4.2	7,060	68.3	14.2	7.7	4.4	3.3	2.2	0.0	71.6	26.2
Ekeby-Gällersta	91.5	0.7	1,270	41.9	27.2	16.9	10.6	1.3	2.1	0.0	43.2	54.6
Fellingsbro	91.0	1.8	2,978	44.1	31.0	11.2	11.1	0.7	1.8	0.0	44.8	53.4
Frövi	90.9	1.1	1,783	58.9	21.6	9.4	5.9	1.9	2.2	0.0	60.9	36.9
Glanshammar	88.5	1.3	2,261	30.0	41.6	14.6	12.8	0.4	0.6	0.0	30.4	69.0
Hallsberg	89.7	4.2	7,073	61.7	15.7	13.3	5.6	2.1	1.5	0.0	63.8	34.7
Hammar	89.2	1.4	2,346	62.8	20.2	7.8	5.1	1.2	3.0	0.0	64.0	33.0
Hällefors	89.5	4.0	6,778	71.2	9.2	7.9	4.4	6.4	0.9	0.0	77.6	21.5
Karlskoga	90.7	13.1	22,243	63.5	10.5	12.8	7.1	5.0	1.1	0.0	68.5	30.4
Kumla	89.4	5.4	9,126	54.4	16.6	15.2	7.3	3.5	3.0	0.0	57.9	39.1
Laxå	89.0	3.0	5,028	58.6	16.5	12.6	5.6	3.5	3.2	0.0	62.1	34.7
Lekeberg	86.2	2.4	4,116	40.4	33.2	12.5	10.3	1.2	2.5	0.0	41.6	56.0
Lerbäck	84.3	1.4	2,361	45.8	29.6	11.2	8.2	1.4	3.7	0.0	47.2	49.0
Linde	88.0	2.6	4,340	55.5	27.6	7.9	5.6	2.2	1.2	0.0	57.7	41.1
Lindesberg	89.6	2.5	4,174	50.1	16.8	18.4	10.4	1.9	2.4	0.0	52.0	45.5
Ljusnarsberg	87.9	2.7	4,618	65.7	15.9	7.4	4.2	4.8	2.0	0.0	70.7	27.5
Nora	87.5	3.2	5,351	55.9	17.7	11.3	9.4	2.8	2.9	0.0	58.7	38.4
Ramsberg	90.5	1.0	1,626	54.7	27.3	8.2	3.8	2.4	3.5	0.0	57.1	39.4
Sköllersta	90.2	1.7	2,816	45.0	29.3	12.3	9.5	0.9	3.1	0.0	45.9	51.1
Stora Mellösa	91.1	0.9	1,582	33.8	33.8	16.5	13.7	0.7	1.5	0.0	34.5	64.0
Tysslinge	90.9	1.2	2,112	58.4	22.7	9.8	6.7	1.0	1.4	0.0	59.4	39.2
Örebro	88.8	30.6	51,814	56.9	10.3	19.7	9.6	2.0	1.4	0.0	59.0	39.6
Postal vote		4.9	8,227	40.7	10.8	25.9	18.9	1.6	2.1	0.1	42.3	55.6
Total	89.3	3.5	169,382	55.8	15.9	15.1	8.6	2.7	1,9	0.0	58.4	39.6
Source:SCB

=== Östergötland ===
Location	Turnout	Share	Votes	S	C	FP	H	VPK	KDS	Other	Left	Right
Alvastra	87.8	0.5	1,258	40.3	35.2	8.3	14.2	0.9	1.0	0.0	41.2	57.8
Aska	87.9	0.6	1,495	42.2	34.0	9.1	11.4	2.1	1.4	0.0	44.1	54.4
Aspveden	93.9	0.4	973	33.7	41.5	7.7	12.8	0.3	3.9	0.0	34.0	62.1
Björsäter	92.5	0.6	1,307	46.2	30.3	5.1	14.3	0.8	3.2	0.0	47.1	49.7
Boberg	90.2	0.8	1,860	46.3	30.2	10.1	11.1	0.7	1.7	0.0	47.0	51.3
Borensberg	91.2	1.0	2,333	49.0	20.4	12.0	12.2	2.8	3.6	0.0	51.8	44.5
Boxholm	92.2	1.3	2,956	68.0	13.2	6.0	6.3	5.0	1.5	0.0	73.0	25.4
Finspång	92.7	4.2	9,816	69.9	8.8	9.0	8.2	2.2	1.8	0.0	72.1	26.1
Folkunga	89.8	0.7	1,506	35.1	41.0	9.0	12.1	0.8	2.1	0.0	35.9	62.0
Godegård	87.3	0.6	1,333	41.6	31.4	14.9	8.4	0.9	2.7	0.0	42.5	54.8
Gryt	90.1	0.3	640	31.3	36.7	14.5	16.2	0.6	0.6	0.0	31.9	67.5
Hällestad	90.7	0.9	2,082	52.0	26.0	9.3	6.5	2.3	4.0	0.0	54.3	41.7
Hävla	91.5	0.8	1,863	48.9	24.2	10.8	13.6	1.4	1.1	0.0	50.3	48.6
Kolmården	86.7	0.7	1,699	58.4	16.4	8.2	11.8	2.2	2.9	0.0	60.6	36.4
Kvillinge	91.5	1.5	3,584	60.7	12.4	13.3	10.5	2.0	1.1	0.0	62.8	36.2
Linköping	90.5	20.0	46,360	54.2	9.1	17.8	13.9	2.9	2.2	0.0	57.0	40.8
Mjölby	89.0	3.2	7,383	60.3	13.6	11.9	9.8	1.8	2.5	0.0	62.1	35.4
Motala	90.8	7.3	16,827	64.8	7.3	15.2	8.0	3.4	1.3	0.0	68.1	30.6
Norra Kinda	92.7	0.8	1,912	36.9	32.0	11.5	14.0	0.4	5.3	0.0	37.3	57.4
Norra Valkebo	92.5	1.0	2,276	46.2	26.2	10.7	13.8	0.6	2.5	0.0	46.8	50.7
Norrköping	89.2	23.9	55,309	59.5	7.9	13.7	15.0	2.6	1.4	0.0	62.1	36.5
Ringarum	93.2	1.0	2,300	51.9	26.7	5.9	11.9	2.3	1.3	0.0	54.1	44.5
Skänninge	89.3	1.1	2,594	48.5	19.9	10.6	14.8	2.4	3.8	0.0	50.9	45.3
Skärblacka	91.8	2.1	4,843	62.1	17.1	7.2	9.5	1.9	2.2	0.0	64.0	33.8
Stegeborg	85.5	0.5	1,138	26.6	47.3	9.1	14.4	0.7	1.8	0.0	27.3	70.8
Söderköping	91.1	1.5	3,570	47.3	20.2	11.2	17.9	0.5	2.9	0.0	47.8	49.4
Södra Göstring	90.1	0.3	769	34.5	42.7	5.7	13.0	2.6	1.6	0.0	37.1	61.4
Södra Kinda	90.4	0.6	1,380	28.3	51.3	3.8	11.2	0.7	4.6	0.0	29.1	66.3
Södra Valkebo	88.2	0.6	1,330	33.0	42.3	8.0	12.0	0.5	4.1	0.0	33.5	62.3
Tjällmo	94.1	0.4	836	46.8	31.5	6.1	11.2	1.1	3.3	0.0	47.8	48.8
Vadstena	89.9	1.8	4,131	55.1	16.5	10.9	13.7	1.0	2.7	0.0	56.1	41.2
Valdemarsvik	92.5	1.0	2,259	62.0	11.1	11.1	11.9	1.8	2.1	0.0	63.8	34.0
Vifolka	90.4	1.1	2,631	45.9	30.6	8.9	10.0	2.3	2.4	0.0	48.2	49.4
Vikbolandet	91.0	1.5	3,511	31.9	39.2	6.6	17.7	0.7	3.8	0.0	32.6	63.5
Vreta kloster	93.0	1.7	4,027	56.1	18.4	10.3	10.1	3.3	1.9	0.0	59.4	38.7
Vårdnäs	90.8	0.8	1,913	37.6	31.6	13.1	11.6	0.7	5.4	0.0	38.3	56.3
Västra Kinda	89.8	1.5	3,357	39.8	30.3	8.4	17.3	1.3	2.9	0.0	41.0	56.1
Ydre	89.6	1.2	2,841	29.3	36.7	16.1	12.2	1.2	4.6	0.0	30.4	65.0
Åkerbo	91.7	1.6	3,750	36.9	33.6	12.7	12.6	0.8	3.4	0.0	37.7	58.9
Åtvidaberg	94.4	2.4	5,499	69.8	10.6	10.4	5.4	1.3	2.5	0.0	71.1	26.5
Ödeshög	88.5	1.1	2,516	40.1	30.4	12.3	12.0	0.7	4.4	0.0	40.9	54.7
Postal vote		5.0	11,483	36.4	10.4	23.0	26.2	1.5	2.3	0.2	37.9	59.6
Total	90.4	4.8	231,450	54.0	14.9	13.5	13.3	2.2	2.3	0.0	56.2	41.6
Source:SCB
