= Braas =

Braas may refer to:

- Braås, a locality situated in Växjö Municipality, Kronoberg County, Sweden
- Lothar Alfred Braas (author abbreviation: Braas, 1942-1995), a German botanist
- Roel Braas (born 1987), a Dutch rower
