= Åtvidaberg Municipality =

Åtvidaberg Municipality Åtvidabergs kommun
- Municipality

- Coat of arms

- Coordinates: 58°12′N 16°00′E
- Country: Sweden
- County: Östergötland County
- Seat: Åtvidaberg

Area
  - Total: 780.27 km^{2} (301.26 sq mi)
  - Land: 686.62 km^{2} (265.11 sq mi)
  - Water: 93.65 km^{2} (36.16 sq mi)
- Area as of 1 January 2014.

Population (30 June 2025)
  - Total: 11,506
  - Density: 16.757/km^{2} (43.402/sq mi)
- Time zone: UTC+1 (CET)
  - Summer (DST): UTC+2 (CEST)
- ISO 3166 code: SE
- Province: Östergötland and Småland
- Municipal code: 0561
- Website: www.atvidaberg.se

Åtvidaberg Municipality (Swedish: Åtvidabergs kommun) is a municipality in Östergötland County in southeastern Sweden. Its seat is located in the town of Åtvidaberg, with some 7,000 inhabitants.

The present municipality was established in 1971 when the market town (köping) of Åtvidaberg (instituted in 1947) was amalgamated with its surrounding rural municipalities. A part of the present territory was transferred from Kalmar County.

== Localities ==
- Berg
- Björsäter
- Falerum
- Grebo
- Åtvidaberg (seat)
- Fröjerum

== Demographics ==
This is a demographic table based on Åtvidaberg Municipality's electoral districts in the 2022 Swedish general election sourced from SVT's election platform, in turn taken from SCB official statistics.

In total there were 11,454 residents, including 9,075 Swedish citizens of voting age. 47.7% voted for the left coalition and 51.3% for the right coalition. Indicators are in percentage points except population totals and income.

Location	Residents	Citizen adults	Left vote	Right vote	Employed	Swedish parents	Foreign heritage	Income SEK	Degree
Location			%	%					
Åtvidaberg C1	2,262	1,863	49.5	49.7	81	88	12	22,423	29
Åtvidaberg C2	2,477	1,978	49.6	49.8	90	93	7	26,161	37
Åtvidaberg N	2,439	1,815	44.8	54.4	89	94	6	28,984	43
Åtvidaberg S	2,116	1,739	48.5	50.5	82	93	7	22,485	22
Åtvidaberg Ö	2,160	1,680	47.8	50.6	77	84	16	22,001	22
Source: SVT

== Notability ==
The Åtvidabergs Vagnfabrik (Wagon Factory), was founded in 1910 and constructed early cars. A total of 12 cars were made. They resembled the American carriage with large wheels.

The Åtvidaberg church "Stora Kyrkan" ("the Big Church") was built in the 1870s in neo-Gothic style. The remains of a 17th-century church were also of interest. It was rebuilt and is now functioning as a church again, "Gamla Kyrkan" ("the Old Church").

At the end of the 19th century almost one third of the population of Åtvidaberg Municipality in Sweden emigrated to Ishpeming, Michigan in the United States as copper mines in the Åtvidaberg area closed down. In 1994 this was commemorated by a plaquette at the Mormorsgruvan mine of Åtvidaberg.

At Eksäter, north of the railway, there is a statue representing David Drummond (1593-1638). He was for a time an officer at the Östgöta foot with residence in Slevringe outside Åtvidaberg. He later became colonel of Kalmar Regiment. David Drummond is the first known tobacco smoker in Sweden.
