= Björsäter =

- Location within Östergötland Location within Sweden
- Coordinates: 58°20′N 16°00′E
- Country: Sweden
- Province: Östergötland
- County: Östergötland County
- Municipality: Åtvidaberg Municipality

Area
  - Total: 0.63 km^{2} (0.24 sq mi)

Population (31 December 2020)
  - Total: 391
  - Density: 620/km^{2} (1,600/sq mi)
- Time zone: UTC+1 (CET)
  - Summer (DST): UTC+2 (CEST)

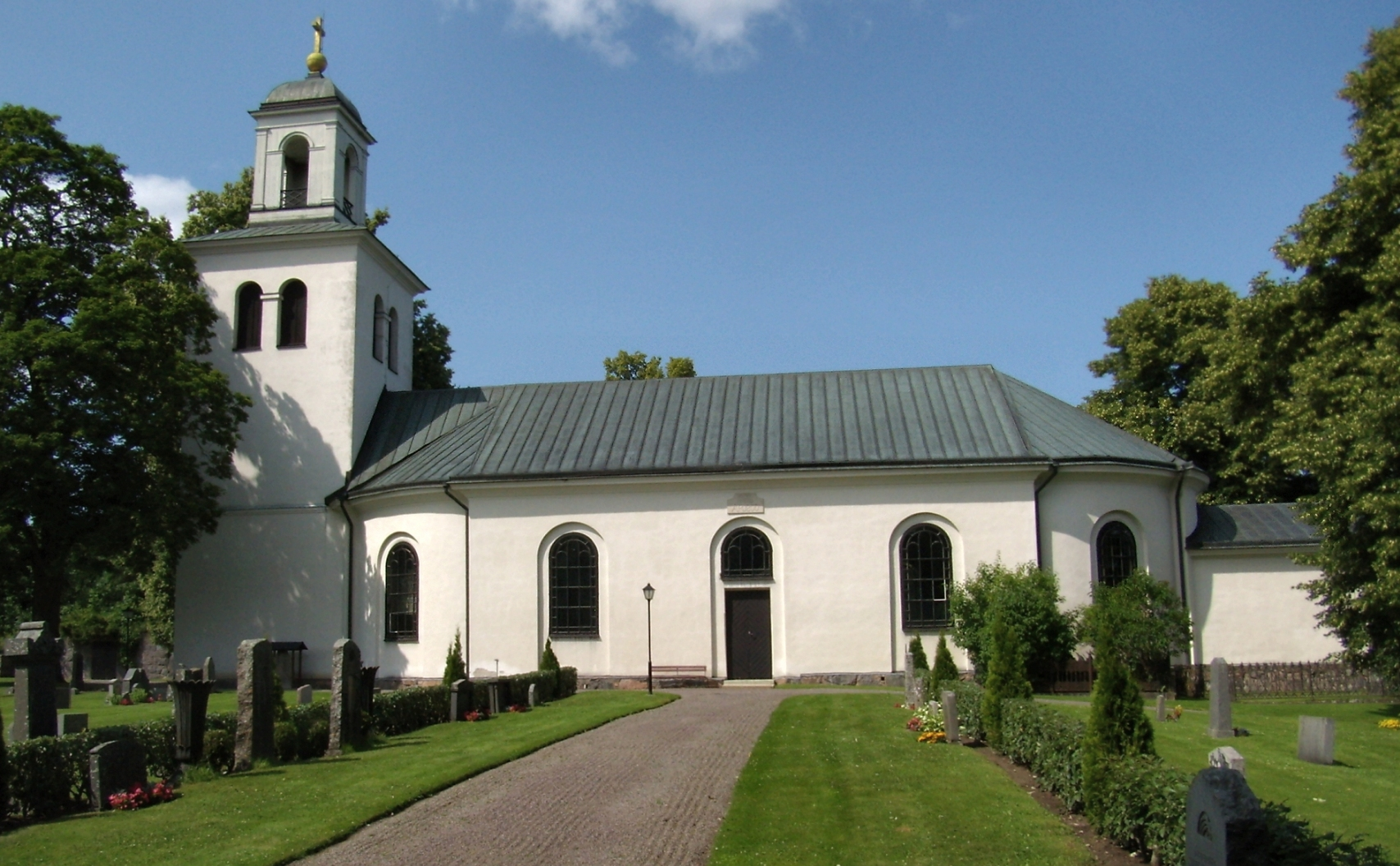
Björsäter Church, Östergötland

Björsäter is a locality situated in Åtvidaberg Municipality, Östergötland County, Sweden with 443 inhabitants in 2010.
