= Braås =

- Location within Kronoberg Location within Sweden
- Coordinates: 57°04′N 15°03′E
- Country: Sweden
- Province: Småland
- County: Kronoberg County
- Municipality: Växjö Municipality

Area
  - Total: 1.71 km^{2} (0.66 sq mi)

Population (31 December 2010)
  - Total: 1,547
  - Density: 905/km^{2} (2,340/sq mi)
- Time zone: UTC+1 (CET)
  - Summer (DST): UTC+2 (CEST)

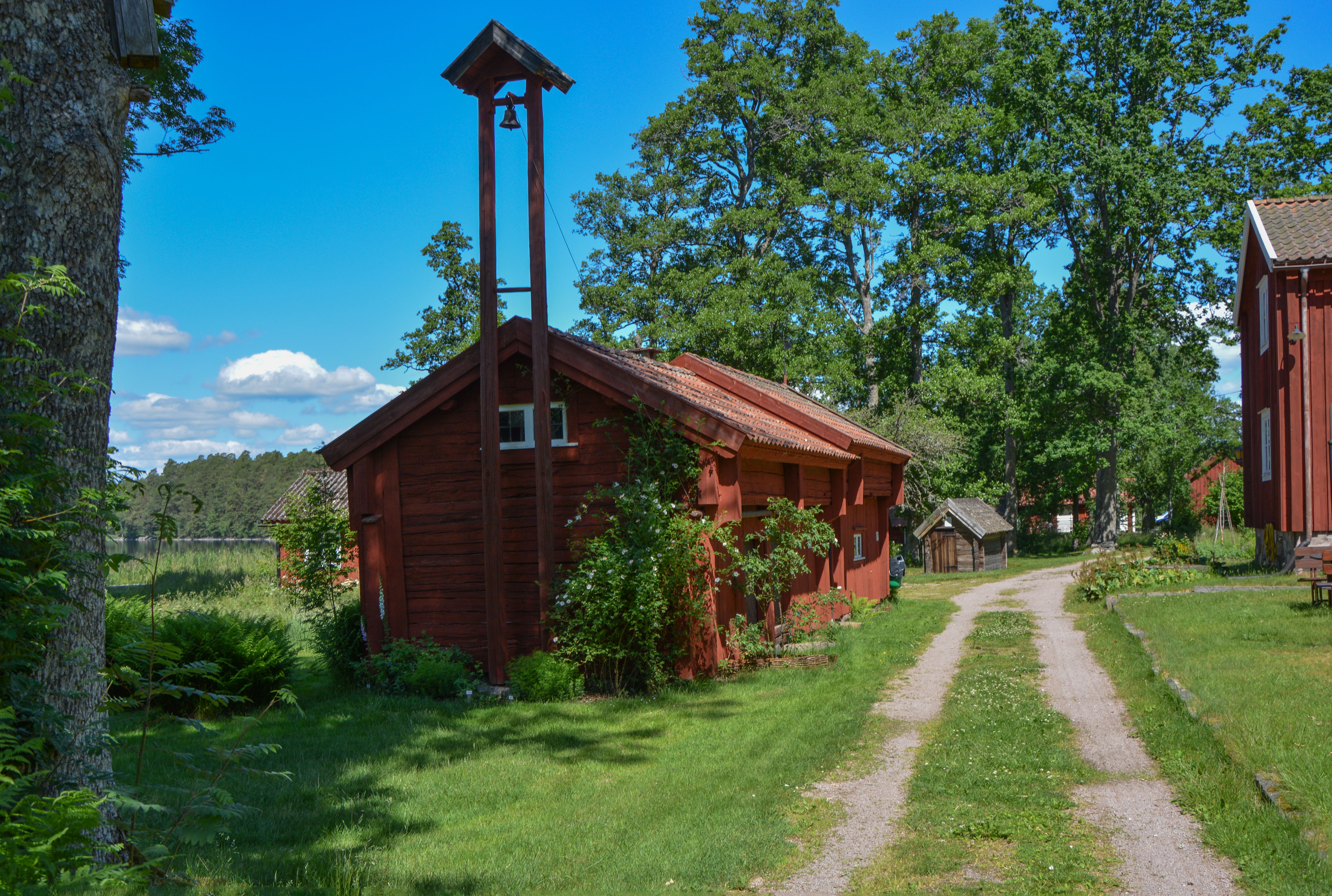
Braås local history museum.

Braås is a locality situated in Växjö Municipality, Kronoberg County, Sweden with 1,547 inhabitants in 2010.

It is the site of a Volvo factory, which was built in 1975.

== Braås in Culture ==
The cycle of poems "Herr Mogens, bondeplågaren" in Albert Ulrik Bååth's book "Svenska toner" (1893) is said to be based on a legend about the nobleman Peder Ryning of Lidboholm, near Braås. The feature film Komedi i Hägerskog* (1968), starring Anita Björk, Tor Isedal, and Ulf Brunnberg, was partially filmed in Braås. *In Jonas Jonasson's novel "The Hundred-Year-Old Man Who Climbed Out the Window and Disappeared" (2009), Braås appears several times.
