= Elisabeth Svantesson =

Swedish politician (born 1967)

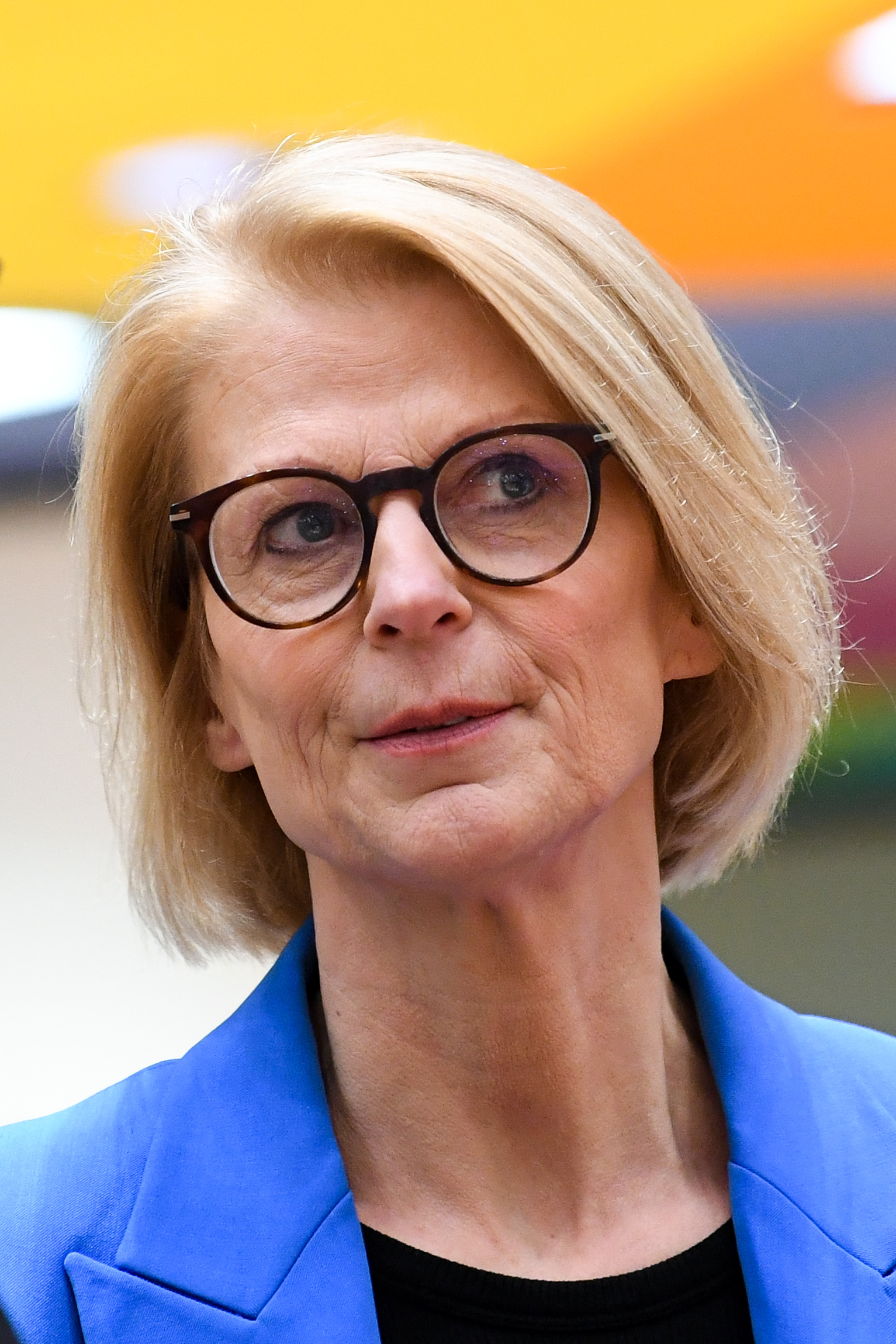
- Svantesson in 2023

Minister for Finance
- Incumbent
- Assumed office 18 October 2022
- Prime Minister: Ulf Kristersson
- Preceded by: Mikael Damberg

Minister for Employment
- In office 17 September 2013 – 3 October 2014
- Prime Minister: Fredrik Reinfeldt
- Preceded by: Hillevi Engström
- Succeeded by: Ylva Johansson

Member of the Riksdag
- Incumbent
- Assumed office 2 October 2006
- Constituency: Örebro County

Deputy Leader of the Moderate Party
- Incumbent
- Assumed office 19 October 2019
- Leader: Ulf Kristersson
- Preceded by: Peter Danielsson

Personal details
- Born: Karin Elisabeth Lundin; 26 October 1967 (age 58) Lycksele, Sweden
- Party: Moderate Party
- Spouse: Bjarne Svantesson (m. 1988; div. 2026)
- Children: 3
- Education: Örebro University
- Profession: University teacher, economist

Karin Elisabeth Svantesson (née Lundin; born 26 October 1967) is a Swedish economist and politician of the Moderate Party. She has served as Minister for Finance in the Kristersson cabinet since October 2022 and as first deputy leader of the Moderate Party since 2019.

Svantesson has been a member of the Riksdag for Örebro County since 2006. She served as chair of the Committee on the Labour Market from 2012 to 2013 and as Minister for Employment in the Reinfeldt cabinet from 2013 to 2014. During the Moderate Party's period in opposition, she served as its employment-policy spokesperson and, from 2017 to 2022, as its economic-policy spokesperson and deputy chair of the Committee on Finance.

As finance minister, Svantesson initially pursued a comparatively restrictive fiscal policy during the period of high inflation, before shifting towards a more expansionary policy as inflation declined. Her tenure has also included revisions to Sweden's fiscal policy framework, increased expenditure on military and civil defence, and extensive tax and budget measures intended to strengthen household finances and economic growth.

== Political career ==
=== Member of the Riksdag (2006–2013) ===
Svantesson was elected to the Riksdag in the 2006 Swedish general election, representing Örebro County. She took office on 2 October 2006.

Following her election, she became a member of the Committee on the Labour Market and a deputy member of the Committee on Industry and Trade. In October 2009, she also became a deputy member of the Committee on Finance, and the following month she joined the parliamentary council of the Swedish National Audit Office.

Svantesson was re-elected in the 2010 Swedish general election. She served as a member of the Committee on Finance from October 2010 until June 2012, when she became chair of the Committee on the Labour Market.

=== Minister for Employment (2013–2014) ===
On 17 September 2013, Prime Minister Fredrik Reinfeldt appointed Svantesson Minister for Employment, succeeding Hillevi Engström. She was on leave from the Riksdag while serving in the government and remained minister until the Reinfeldt cabinet left office on 3 October 2014 following the 2014 Swedish general election.

=== Return to the Riksdag (2014–2022) ===
Svantesson resumed her duties as a member of the Riksdag on 4 October 2014. She became deputy chair of the Committee on Social Insurance and briefly served as a member of the Committee on the Labour Market before becoming its deputy chair on 16 December 2014.

On 11 December 2014, she was appointed the Moderate Party's spokesperson for employment policy.

After Ulf Kristersson became party leader in October 2017, Svantesson was appointed the party's economic-policy spokesperson. She also became deputy chair of the Committee on Finance, positions she held until entering government in 2022.

=== Deputy leader of the Moderate Party (2015–present) ===
On 17 December 2014, Svantesson was nominated as second deputy leader of the Moderate Party. She was elected to the position at an extraordinary party conference on 10 January 2015.

At the party conference in October 2019, she was elected first deputy leader, succeeding Peter Danielsson.

== Minister for Finance (2022–present) ==
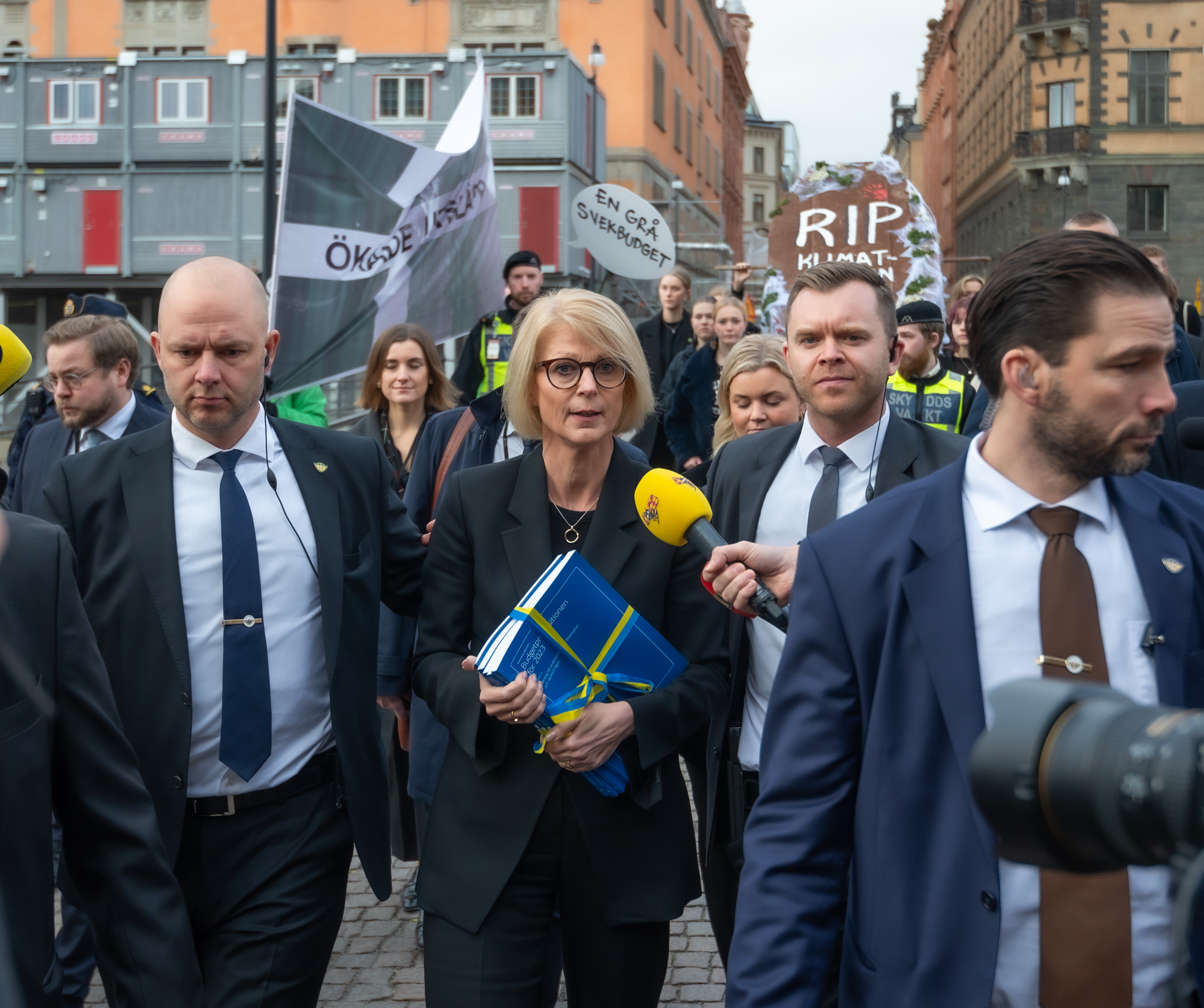
Svantesson presenting the Government's first budget in November 2022

Svantesson was appointed Minister for Finance in the Kristersson cabinet on 18 October 2022, succeeding Mikael Damberg. As finance minister, she is responsible for the government's economic policy, fiscal policy, taxation, financial markets and budget. The government's budgets have been negotiated by the three governing parties and the Sweden Democrats under the Tidö Agreement.

=== Inflation and the first budgets ===
Svantesson presented the government's first budget, for 2023, in November 2022. It was introduced during a period of high inflation, rising interest rates, elevated electricity prices and weakening economic growth following the Russian invasion of Ukraine. The budget contained reforms intended to support households and businesses, strengthen welfare services and increase expenditure on defence, the police and the judicial system. It also included measures concerning fossil-free electricity production and the energy sector.

During 2023 and the first half of 2024, Svantesson pursued a comparatively restrictive fiscal policy. She argued that large general stimulus measures could prolong inflation and require the Riksbank to maintain higher interest rates. The government instead concentrated much of its additional expenditure on targeted support, municipalities and regions, defence and law enforcement.

The budget for 2024 contained reforms estimated at SEK 39 billion. Its stated priorities included combating inflation and mitigating its effects, supporting the welfare system and increasing funding for defence and the judicial system.

The restrained approach was intended to prevent fiscal policy from counteracting the Riksbank's monetary policy. However, the government was also criticised for not providing greater support to municipalities, regions and households as the Swedish economy weakened. The National Institute of Economic Research reported in September 2023 that Sweden was in an economic downturn and forecast that unemployment would rise to 8.3 per cent during 2024.

=== Taxation and household finances ===
Under Svantesson, the government reduced taxes on earned income, pensions, petrol and diesel. It also expanded the earned income tax credit and introduced or extended several tax deductions. The government argued that these measures would strengthen incentives to work, restore household purchasing power and reduce transport costs for households and businesses.

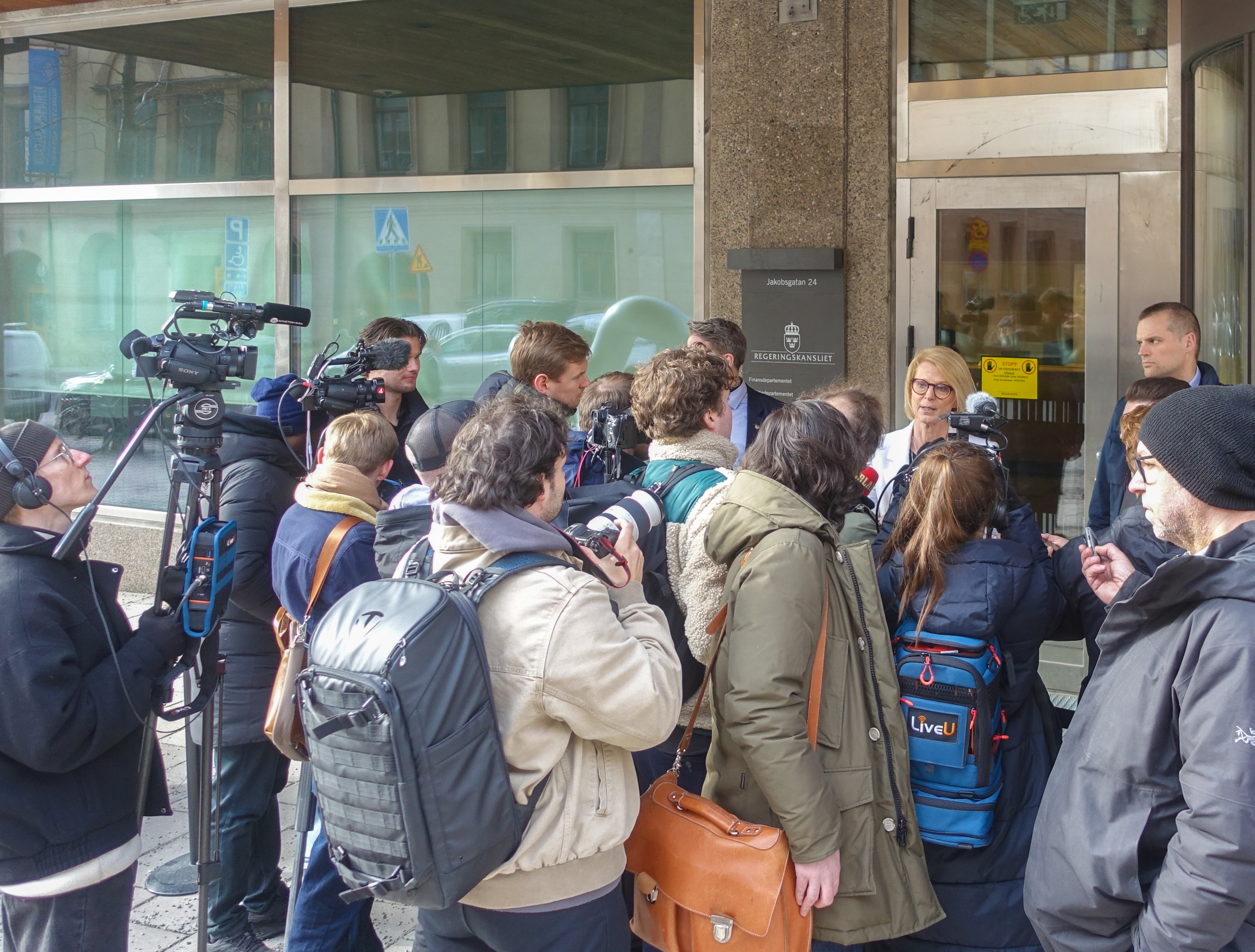
Svantesson speaking to the media after meeting representatives of Sweden's major grocery retailers in March 2023

High inflation and rising mortgage rates nevertheless caused a substantial decline in households' purchasing power during the first part of her tenure. In September 2023, the National Institute of Economic Research concluded that high inflation and rising interest rates were eroding household purchasing power and contributing to declining consumption and residential investment.

As inflation and interest rates subsequently declined, real household incomes began to recover. Household consumption and housing construction nevertheless remained weak for an extended period, contributing to the prolonged economic downturn.

=== Fuel policy and climate criticism ===
The government reduced taxes on petrol and diesel and sharply lowered Sweden's statutory biofuel reduction obligation from January 2024. It argued that the changes were necessary to lower fuel prices and ease financial pressure on households, agriculture and transport-dependent businesses.

The measures became one of the most controversial elements of the government's economic policy. Opposition parties and environmental organisations argued that they would increase greenhouse gas emissions and make Sweden's national and European climate commitments more difficult to achieve.

The independent Swedish Climate Policy Council concluded in its 2024 report that the government's action plan did not explain how Sweden would meet its obligations under the European Union's Effort Sharing Regulation. The council also warned that lowering the reduction obligation and fuel taxes would increase transport emissions and could require more abrupt and expensive emission reductions later in the decade.

In its 2025 report, the council stated that preliminary statistics showed a substantial increase in transport emissions during 2024, which it linked principally to the reduced biofuel obligation and lower fuel taxes.

=== Shift towards economic recovery ===
As inflation declined during 2024, the government shifted the emphasis of its economic policy from inflation restraint towards supporting economic recovery, employment and household purchasing power.

The budget for 2025 contained reforms totalling approximately SEK 60 billion, excluding military assistance to Ukraine. Its principal measures included an expanded earned income tax credit, reduced taxation of pensions and savings, and increased funding for defence, law enforcement, infrastructure, research and welfare services.

Svantesson described the change as a transition from fighting inflation to strengthening growth, employment and Sweden's long-term competitiveness. The government also argued that lower taxation of labour would increase household consumption and make employment more financially rewarding.

The economic recovery during 2025 was weaker and less consistent than the government had initially expected. In March 2025, the National Institute of Economic Research described the recovery as fragile and forecast that unemployment would remain significantly elevated through 2026. Weak household consumption, low residential construction and international uncertainty continued to weigh on economic activity.

The 2025 spring budget contained further measures intended to support economic activity and strengthen national security. It was presented amid uncertainty surrounding increased United States tariffs and turbulence in international financial markets.

=== Budget for 2026 ===
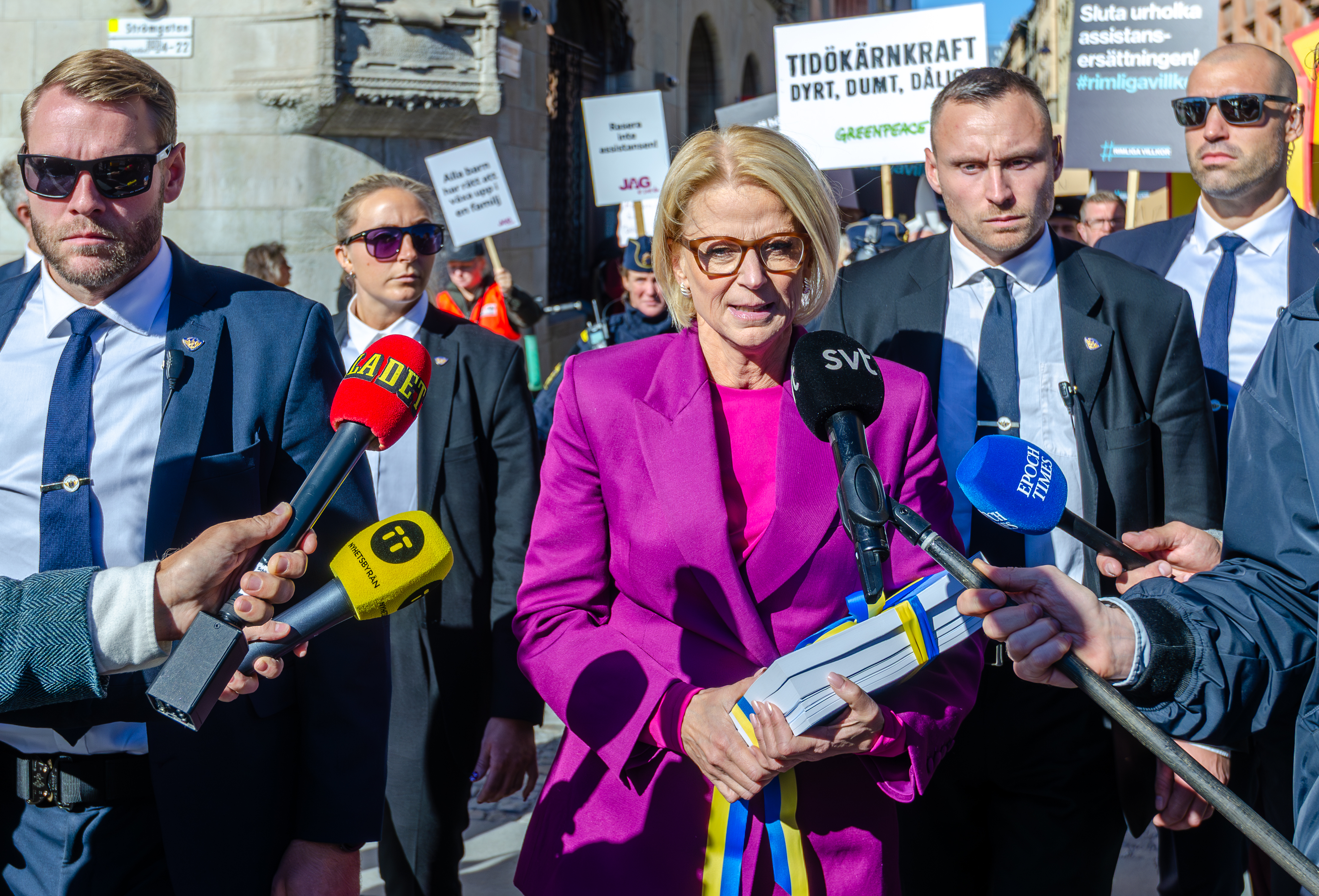
Svantesson during the traditional budget walk in September 2025

The budget for 2026 marked a more expansionary phase of Svantesson's tenure. It contained reforms totalling almost SEK 80 billion and included further reductions in income tax, lower childcare fees, reduced taxation of sickness and activity compensation, lower electricity taxation and protection for households against unusually high electricity and gas prices.

The budget also contained increased expenditure on welfare, education, infrastructure, civil preparedness, military defence and support for Ukraine. The government argued that Sweden's comparatively low public debt provided room for a temporary fiscal expansion without endangering long-term sustainability.

In April 2026, Svantesson presented a spring budget containing measures worth SEK 7.7 billion. The package included temporarily reduced fuel taxes and subsidies linked to electricity and gas prices. It was introduced in response to heightened international uncertainty and renewed increases in global energy prices.

=== Economic performance ===
Inflation fell substantially during Svantesson's tenure. Annual inflation according to the CPIF, the measure used by the Riksbank for its inflation target, declined from 10.2 per cent in December 2022 to 1.3 per cent in June 2026.

The government argued that its restrictive fiscal policy during 2023 and early 2024 helped avoid adding further inflationary pressure. The decline in inflation was also influenced by the Riksbank's interest-rate increases, falling international energy and commodity prices and the normalisation of global supply chains. It therefore cannot be attributed solely to government fiscal policy.

Sweden retained comparatively strong public finances and a relatively low level of government debt. This provided the government with greater fiscal room to reduce taxes, increase defence expenditure and stimulate economic activity after inflation had declined. The National Institute of Economic Research concluded in its 2025 fiscal sustainability assessment that Sweden's public finances were sustainable in the long term, although future demographic pressures would require continued prioritisation.

At the same time, Sweden experienced a prolonged economic downturn. Household consumption, residential construction and business investment were adversely affected by high inflation and interest rates. The recovery began during 2025 but remained uneven and was slowed by increased geopolitical and international trade uncertainty.

The labour market was a particular weakness. Unemployment remained elevated and the recovery in employment lagged behind the recovery in output. In June 2026, the National Institute of Economic Research forecast that economic growth would strengthen during the second half of 2026 but that unemployment would remain somewhat elevated at the end of 2027.

Assessments of Svantesson's economic record have therefore been mixed. The decline in inflation, preservation of strong public finances and capacity to finance defence and later economic stimulus have been cited as positive outcomes. The prolonged downturn, high unemployment, initial decline in household purchasing power and weak residential construction have been cited as significant negative outcomes.

=== Fiscal policy framework ===
Svantesson participated in a cross-party review of Sweden's fiscal policy framework. Following the recommendations of a parliamentary committee, the existing surplus target for general government net lending was replaced by a balanced budget target from 2027. The debt anchor was retained at 35 per cent of gross domestic product.

The revised framework was intended to preserve fiscal discipline while providing somewhat greater scope for public investment and economic stabilisation. Supporters argued that the previous surplus target was unnecessarily restrictive in view of Sweden's low public debt. Critics warned that the additional fiscal space could be used for permanent expenditure or tax reductions rather than productivity-enhancing investment.

The independent Swedish Fiscal Policy Council considered Sweden's public finances to be sustainable but criticised aspects of the government's budget presentation. In its 2025 report, the council questioned the usefulness of the government's concept of reform space, criticised the limited explanation of how fiscal policy would return to the surplus target and considered proposed increases in the expenditure ceilings for 2025 and 2026 unnecessary.

=== Defence expenditure and support for Ukraine ===
Defence and security policy became an increasingly important component of fiscal policy during Svantesson's tenure. The government substantially increased appropriations for military defence, civil defence and support for Ukraine.

In June 2025, the government reached an agreement with the Social Democrats, the Sweden Democrats, the Left Party, the Centre Party and the Green Party on financing a rapid expansion of Sweden's total defence.

Under the agreement, additional military and civil-defence expenditure could be temporarily financed through borrowing between 2026 and 2034. The maximum increase in debt was set at SEK 300 billion, of which up to SEK 50 billion could be used for civil-defence infrastructure and emergency stockpiles. Military and civil support to Ukraine was excluded from the SEK 300 billion ceiling.

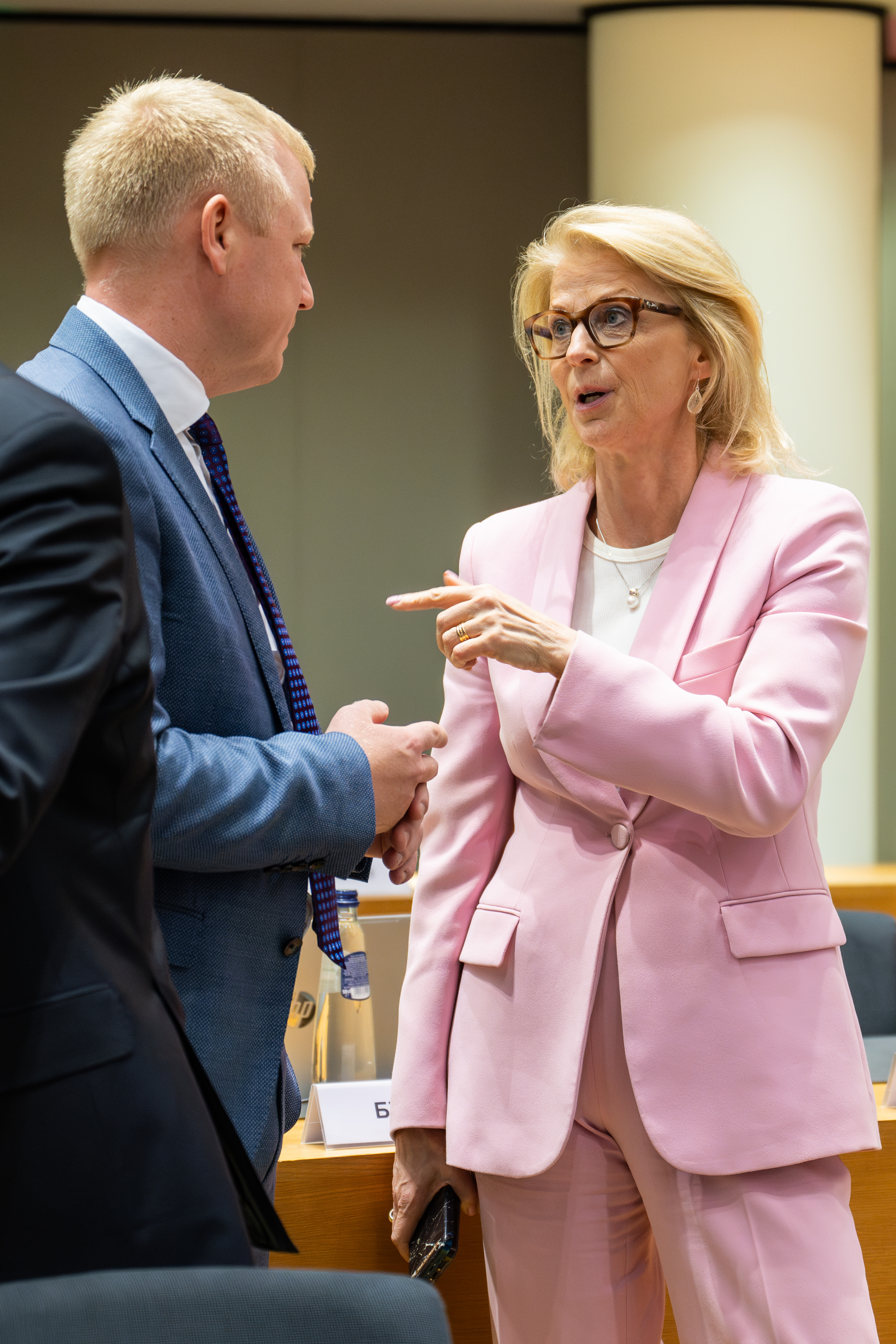
Svantesson at a meeting of the Economic and Financial Affairs Council in Brussels in May 2024

The agreement retained the debt anchor and required general government net lending to return to balance by 2035. The participating parties acknowledged that permanent increases in defence expenditure would ultimately require permanent financing.

The settlement enabled defence capabilities to be expanded more rapidly than would have been possible under the ordinary annual budget process. However, additional borrowing also reduced future fiscal flexibility and increased the likelihood that later governments would need to raise revenue, reduce other expenditure or reprioritise within the budget.

=== European and international role ===
As finance minister, Svantesson has represented Sweden in the Economic and Financial Affairs Council of the Council of the European Union, as well as in the International Monetary Fund and the World Bank.

During the Swedish presidency of the Council of the European Union in the first half of 2023, she chaired meetings of the Economic and Financial Affairs Council. Its work included European financial assistance to Ukraine, economic sanctions against Russia, financial-market regulation and negotiations concerning the reform of the European Union's fiscal rules.

In October 2024, Svantesson was selected as chair of the joint Development Committee of the World Bank and the International Monetary Fund. Her term as chair began in November 2024 and was scheduled to last for two years. The committee advises the two institutions on development policy, poverty reduction and financial assistance to low- and middle-income countries.

== International financial institutions ==
- Asian Infrastructure Investment Bank (AIIB), Governor for Sweden on the Board of Governors (since 2022)
- European Bank for Reconstruction and Development (EBRD), Governor for Sweden on the Board of Governors (since 2022)
- European Investment Bank (EIB), Member of the Board of Governors (since 2022)
- Multilateral Investment Guarantee Agency (MIGA), Governor for Sweden (since 2022)
- Nordic Investment Bank (NIB), Member of the Board of Governors (since 2022); chair of the Board of Governors from June 2025 to May 2026
- World Bank Group, Governor for Sweden on the Boards of Governors of the International Bank for Reconstruction and Development and the International Development Association (since 2022)
- Joint Development Committee of the World Bank and the International Monetary Fund, chair (since October 2024)

== Personal life ==
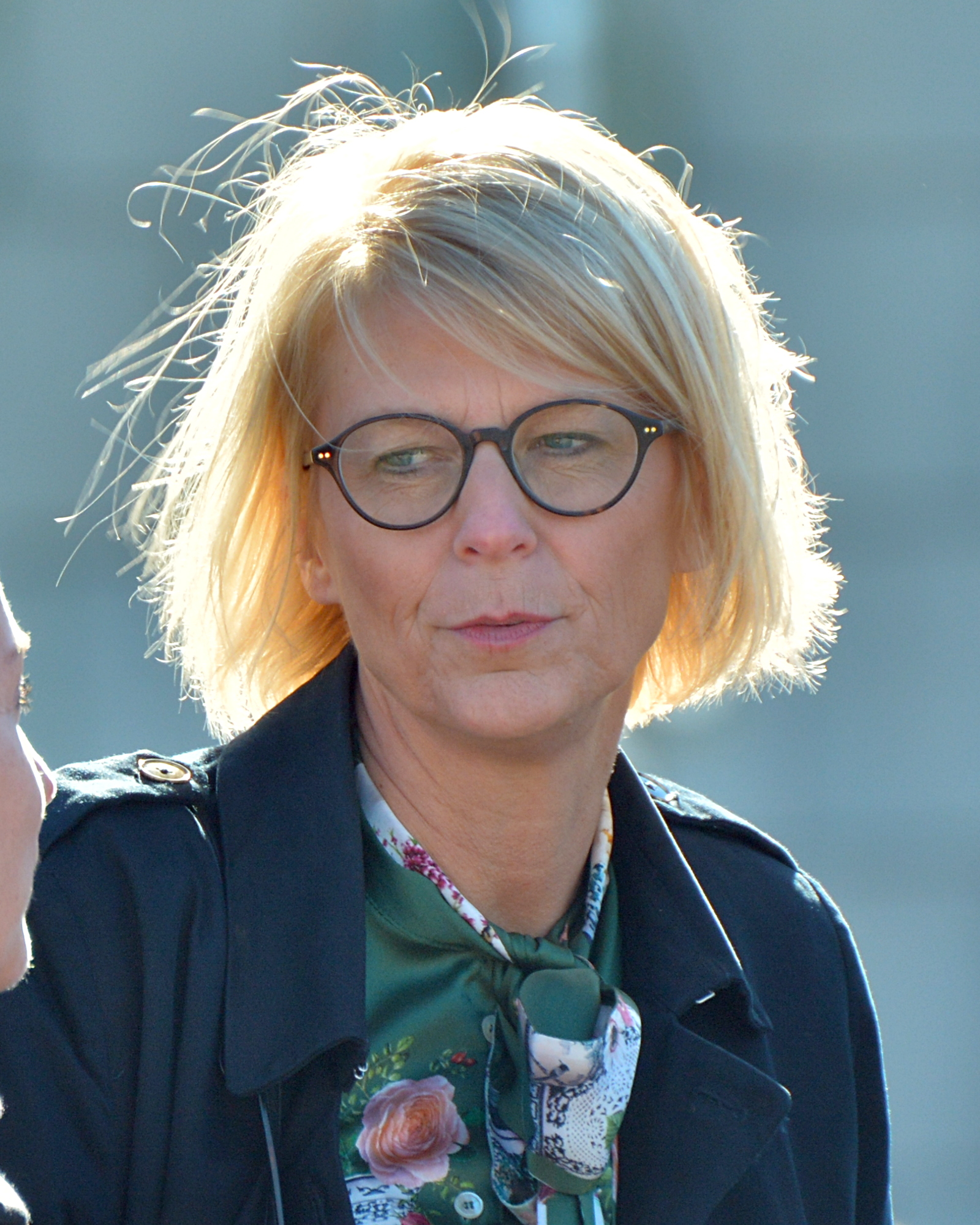
Svantesson in 2018

Svantesson lives in Örebro and has three sons. She was married to Bjarne Svantesson for 38 years before the couple divorced in 2026.

Svantesson was raised in a Christian family. Her father, Alvar Lundin, was a pastor in the Mission Covenant Church of Sweden, and her mother worked as a teacher. During her youth in Östersund, she attended Odenslundskyrkan, a local congregation that later became part of Equmeniakyrkan. She was subsequently a member of Livets Ord, a congregation associated with the Swedish Word of Faith movement, and worked as a teacher at a school operated by the church in Uppsala. She later left the congregation.

During the 1990s, Svantesson was also active in the anti-abortion organisation Ja till livet, serving for a period as its information secretary and participating in public campaigns against Sweden's abortion legislation. Her religious background and earlier involvement in the organisation attracted attention when she was appointed Minister for Employment in 2013. Svantesson has since distanced herself from her former opposition to abortion and has stated that she supports Sweden's abortion legislation. In a 2026 interview, she said that her earlier rhetoric had probably hurt more people than it had encouraged and described her views as having changed substantially since the 1990s. She also expressed support for constitutionally protecting the right to abortion.

== Honours ==
- Ukraine: Third Class of the Order of Princess Olga (15 September 2026)

Party political offices
Preceded by Beatrice Ask	Second Deputy Leader of the Moderate Party; 2015–2019	Succeeded by Anna Tenje
Preceded by Ulf Kristersson	Spokesperson for the Moderate Party's economic policy 2017–present	Incumbent
Preceded by Peter Danielsson	First Deputy Leader of the Moderate Party; 2019–present	Incumbent
Political offices
Preceded by Hillevi Engström	Minister for Employment; 2013–2014	Succeeded by Ylva Johansson
Preceded by Mikael Damberg	Minister for Finance; 2022–present	Incumbent
