= Arkiv Digital =

Online genealogy platform; digital library

Arkiv Digital AD AB
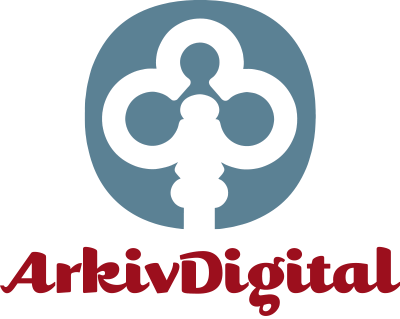
- Logotype since February 2015. Motto: “Your key to historical knowledge.”
- Screenshot
- Company type: Limited liability company, privately-owned
- Website type: Digitalized historical sources and name indexes for genealogists and historians online
- Available in: Swedish, English
- Headquarters: Lyrestad, Sweden
- Founder: Mikael Karlsson (born in 1971)
- Chairperson: Jan Aronson, Täby
- CEO: David Lundgren, Gothenburg
- Industry: Online platform for genealogical and historical research. Family tree builder.
- Products: Subscription service for digitized historic sources on the internet
- Revenue: SEK 43 628 000 (2023)
- Employees: 27 (average 2023)
- Website: arkivdigital.net
- Registration: Yes
- Launched: 2005; 21 years ago

Arkiv Digital AD AB is a Swedish company that produces and provides color photographs of historical records, along with digital indexes of names for historical research. These resources cover a time span from the 1600s to the 1900s. The company's primary clientele includes genealogists, historians, local history researchers, libraries and associations.

Arkiv Digital operates as a privately-held limited liability company with its headquarters located in Lyrestad, within the Mariestad Municipality, Sweden.

The Family Tree Magazine has for over a decade, including in 2024, listed Arkiv Digital as one of the world's top 101 websites for genealogists.

== Photographed historical documents ==
Since its founding in 2005, Arkiv Digital's competitive advantage has been the ability to offer newly photographed color images of Swedish historical records, unlike its competitors, who mainly offer black-and-white images digitized from microfilms and microfiche. Color photographs enhance readability, particularly when dealing with discolored documents or text that has been crossed out.

Arkiv Digital photographs historical documents in public archival institutions across Sweden, including the National Archives of Sweden and its regional archives, the Military Archives, and the city archives of Stockholm and Malmö. Their image database, as of the end of 2023, contains nearly 97 million color images of historical documents, many of which are spreads.

In general, the primary sources for Swedish genealogical research are the church books (parish registers) kept in the parish church archives, now stored in the regional archives under the National Archives. This is because up to 1991, most of the Swedish population registration in Sweden was legally managed by Church of Sweden on a per parish basis.

Among the key types of records Arkiv Digital has photographed are the following:

- Church books: Virtually all Swedish church books up to approximately 1950.
- Swedish-American church books from ten states in the USA.
- Estate inventories (bouppteckningar): All estate inventories up to around 1960, complete with name indexes. These inventories specify the heirs of the deceased and may include additional genealogical information.
- The mantals tax records (mantalslängder) 1642–1820. These were created annually per parish. They list the taxes levied on individuals meeting specific criteria, primarily based on age.
- Military rolls dating from 1620 onward, along with naval rolls, general muster rolls, and service records.
- Genealogical collections: A significant portion of older genealogies in the Swedish House of Nobility, spanning the 1600s to the 1800s, and the entire Genealogica collection in the National Archives, with genealogies compiled during the 1500s and 1600s.

The image database also includes judicial documents, mostly court records and land registration protocols, as well as a considerable number of other archival series, such as prisoner rolls, and archives related to “seaman's houses” (sjömanshus, state institutions for mustering and registering seamen in mercantile shipping). Among local materials is an extensive collection of digitized historical records from the regional archive of the Swedish-speaking Åland in Mariehamn, Finland.

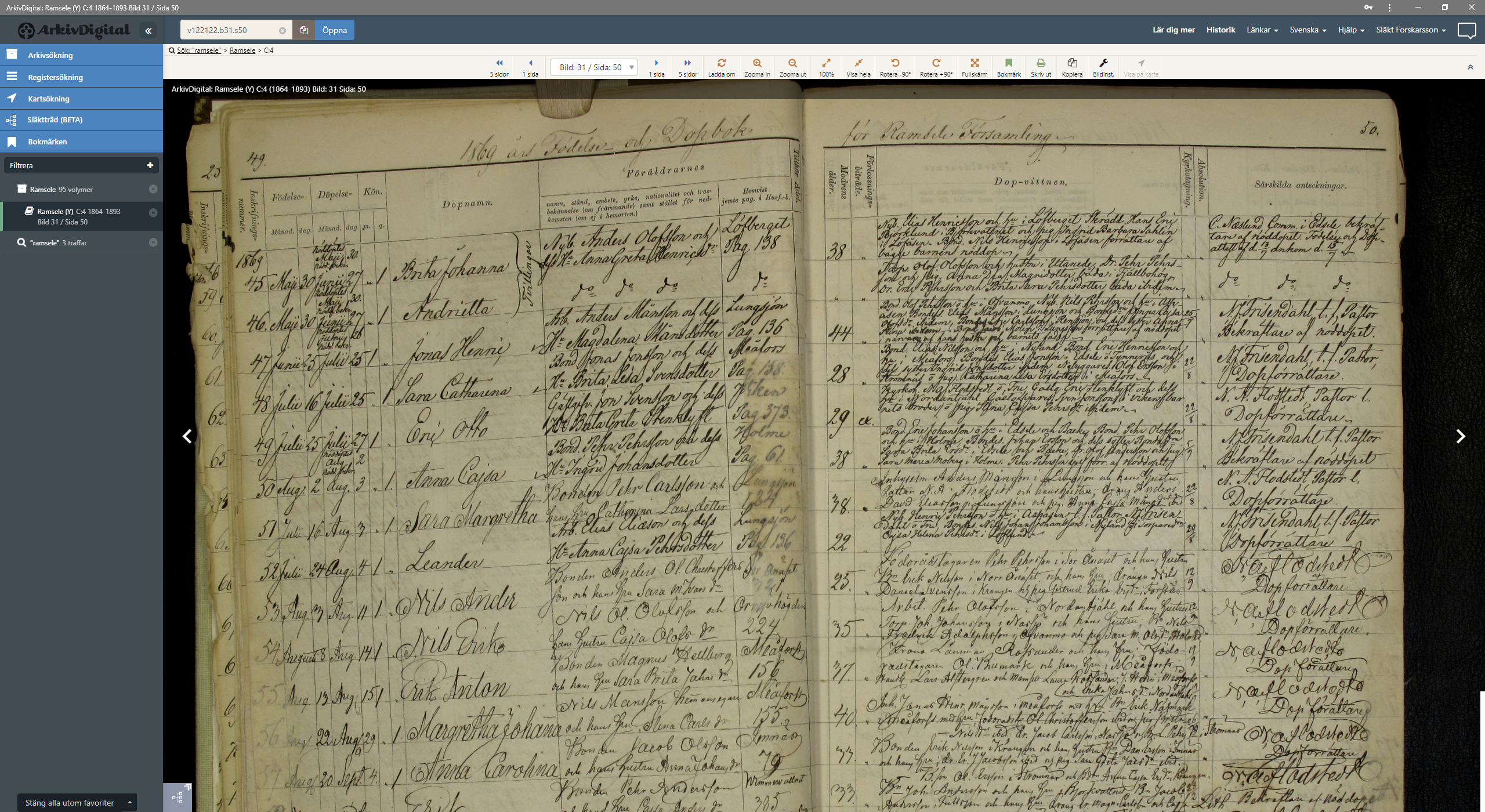
This screenshot from Arkiv Digital's subscription service shows a spread in the Birth and Christening records 1864–1893 for the parish of Ramsele, Sweden.

== Name indexes ==
Arkiv Digital has since 2016 been launching a number of large name indexes to historical records. By the end of 2023, the total number of index entries reached 262.3 million.

Among the key name indexes are:

- The Swedish Population (Befolkningen i Sverige, BiS) 1800–1947: This is the largest name index, containing over 133 million entries. It covers the entire Swedish population based on catechismal household records (husförhörslängder) and congregation records (församlingsböcker). (Created in collaboration with MyHeritage.)
- Census of Sweden (Sveriges befolkning) 1940, 1950, 1960, 1970, 1975, 1980, 1985 and 1990, covering the entire Swedish population these years.
- Indexes of births (1750–1840), marriages (1750–1840), and deaths (1750–1799) for all Swedish counties.
- Index of digitized estate inventories, with nearly 6.2 million entries.
- The Stockholm Population (Befolkningen i Stockholm) 1945.
- Swedes in the USA (Svenskar i USA) 1940.
- Index of all Swedish emigrants departing from Stockholm, Gothenburg, Malmö, and Helsingborg. (Created in collaboration with Ancestry.com.)
- Index of general muster rolls 1660–1887, with approximately 4.37 million searchable entries from the Military Archives for infantry and cavalry.
- Index of conscription cards (stamkort): Around 2.4 million entries for men enlisted between 1902 and 1950.

All of these index entries – except for Census of Sweden for the years 1950 and 1960 – have direct links to the original sources. For subsequent years of Census of Sweden, the indexes themselves are the original, digital sources from the Swedish authorities.

== History ==
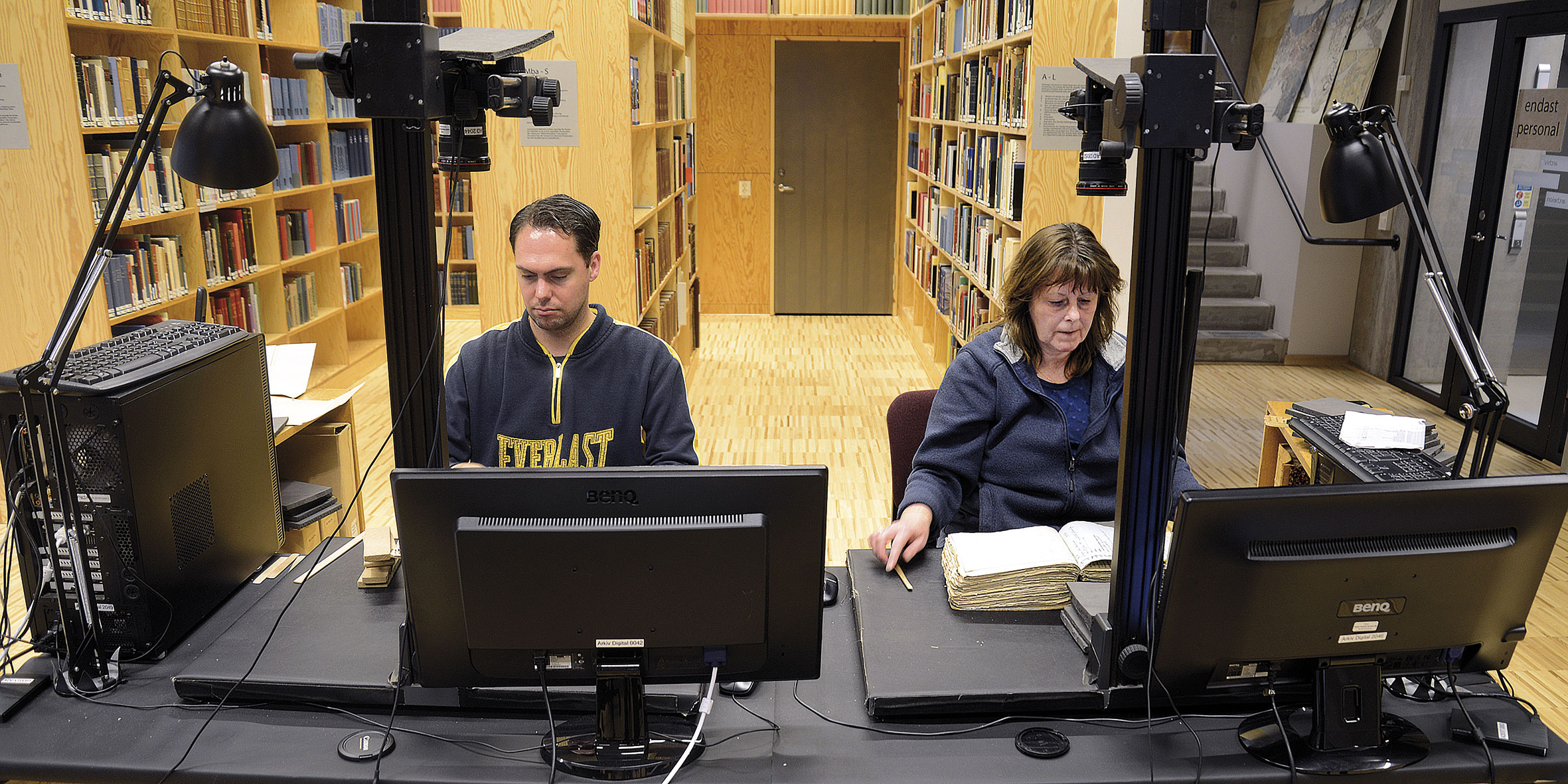
Staff at Arkiv Digital are digitizing historical records at the Regional archives in Gothenburg in 2013. Foto: Håkan Skogsjö.

=== Origins and business idea ===
In 2004, Mikael Karlsson in Mariestad started the business that later became Arkiv Digital. An investment memorandum from 2008 summarizes the origins: “The initiative to establish the company Arkiv Digital was taken by Mikael Karlsson, Gabriel Wallgren, Magnus Näslund and others in the summer of 2005. One year prior, Mikael Karlsson had already started taking digital photographs of the church books for Bohuslän county; Gabriel Wallgren, with years of genealogical research experience, had been a partner of Genline [AB], where Magnus Näslund had been working as a software engineer and was a partner as well. In the fall of 2005, their cooperation was formalized, leading to the establishment of the limited liability company Arkiv Digital AD AB. In the summer of 2008, Arkiv Digital AD AB merged with HH DigiArkiv AB (formerly GH Microscan, founded in 2001) and acquired all the shares in the company. This was an important step in creating a genealogy research company for the future.” (Translated from Swedish.)

The business idea was to “digitize historical source material with the highest possible quality using the latest technical equipment available and sell these digitized images to genealogists, associations, libraries, and other researchers.”

=== Distribution and growth ===
Initially, CDs were used to distribute the photographed documents. However, Arkiv Digital soon developed its own image format and software for internet distribution of images. This image viewing program integrated images, archival information, and catalog entries (mainly sourced from the National Archives Database, NAD), with images registered down to the page level. In 2007, Arkiv Digital launched a subscription service, allowing researchers to access the company's entire image database via the internet. This service quickly became the company's primary source of revenue, a status it still holds. (According to the 2023 annual report, 98.4% of net turnover is from subscription sales, while 0.8% comes from book sales.)

In 2011, Arkiv Digital reported a positive result for the first time. The company received the financial newspaper Dagens Industri's “Gasellpriset” (“Gazelle Award”) for rapid and profitable growth in 2013, 2014, and 2015.

=== Diversifying ===
In the early years, Arkiv Digital mainly served Swedish genealogists. The early annual reports emphasized that it was “founded by genealogists for genealogists,” and the company's focus was on documents in church archives. By the end of 2011, Arkiv Digital achieved its goal of digitizing the most relevant types of church books for genealogists, covering records up to around 1900. This achievement allowed the company to offer photographs of the same church books as the then competitors Genline and SVAR, but with the added benefit of color. (SVAR was the department within the National Archives responsible for digitizing archival materials. These were made available on the digital platform SVAR, for a subscription fee.)

Around 2013, Arkiv Digital started broadening its range of source materials to appeal to new user groups, and the company began marketing itself in other Nordic countries and in the US to diversify beyond reliance on the Swedish market. In 2014, the company began adding a number of features that were missing on the SVAR platform. One of these was the service called “order photography”, introduced in 2015. With this service, users could pay to have specific volumes digitized and added to the image database. Another example of diversifying was the acquisition in 2016 of several million older aerial photographs, depicting farms and houses of all kinds across Sweden, from the company Svenska Aero-Bilder AB. These photographs date from the 1950s onward and were released in 2021, organized by map locations.

After some years of public debate, the digitized materials on the SVAR platform became a completely tax-funded service, free of charge, on February 1, 2018, and the platform was renamed “Digital Research Room.” That meant the National Archives became a strong competitor of Arkiv Digital.

The main clientele of Arkiv Digital are still the genealogists, and Arkiv Digital has since 2009 been the main sponsor for Släktforskardagarna, a Nordic, annual genealogy fair described as one of the largest assemblies for genealogists in the world, according to the company's annual reports.

=== New trend results in name indexes ===
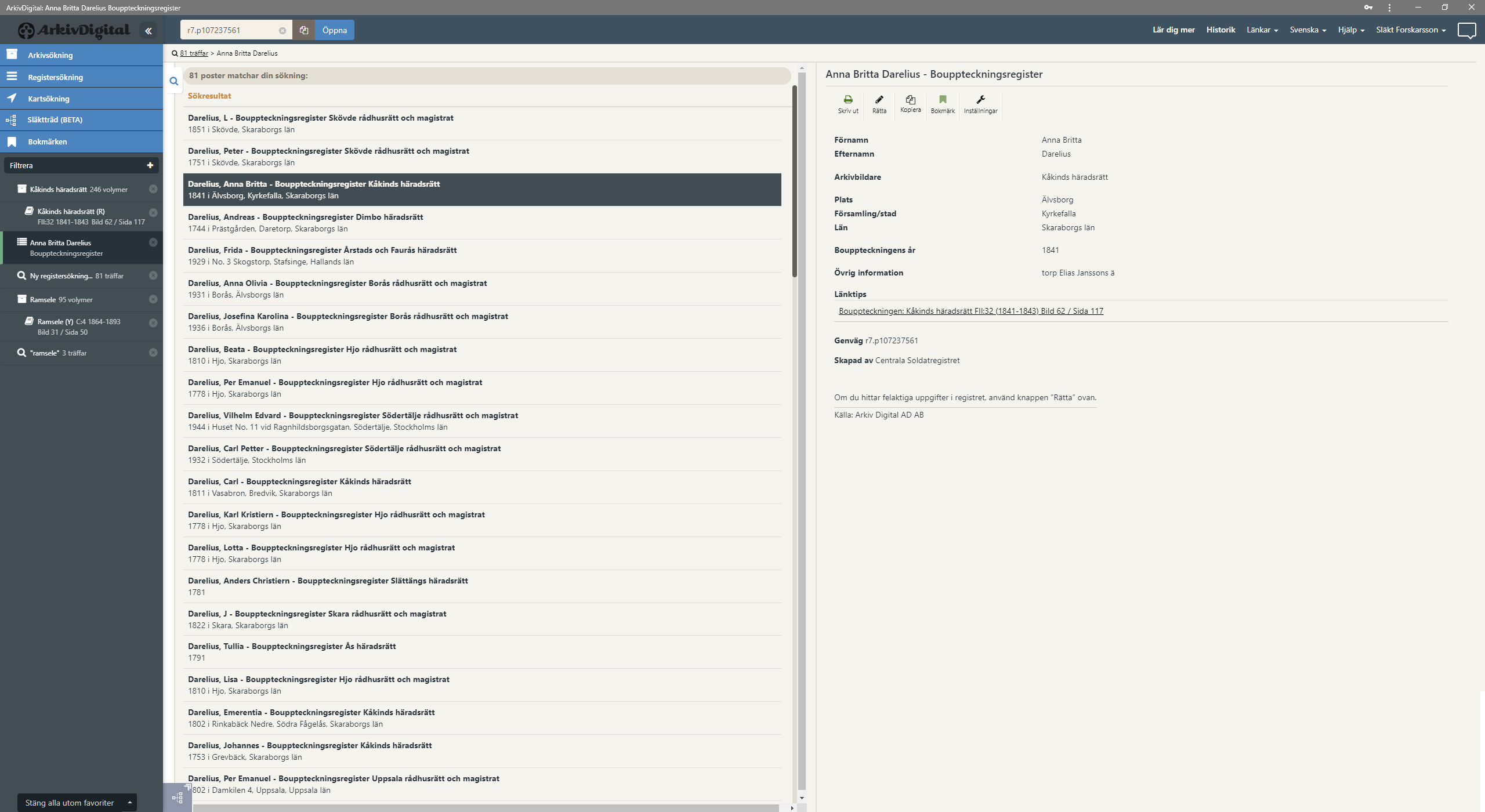
Screenshot showing the results from searching for Anna Britta Darelius in Arkiv Digital's digital name index for estate inventories (2022), with a direct link to the corresponding photographed archival document.

In the 2014 annual report, Arkiv Digital highlighted a new trend among younger users: They are less inclined to sift through large volumes of documents and expect instead easy searchability; otherwise, they tend to give up. As a strategic move, the company started creating name indexes for various types of historical records. In early 2016, Arkiv Digital could offer the indexes Census of Sweden for 1950 and 1960 respectively, and The Swedish Population (“Befolkningen i Sverige”) for 1880–1920. The same year, Arkiv Digital initiated collaborations with various genealogy associations to create searchable name indexes for all of Sweden's birth, marriage, and death records. The annual report of 2016 states that the three legs of Arkiv Digital are the archival materials, the indexes, and the user interface.

The COVID-19 pandemic heavily limited the company's ability to photograph archival materials at state archives. According to the annual reports, much of the energy was instead spent on expanding the name indexes and improving the user interface.

=== Integrating family trees with historical records ===
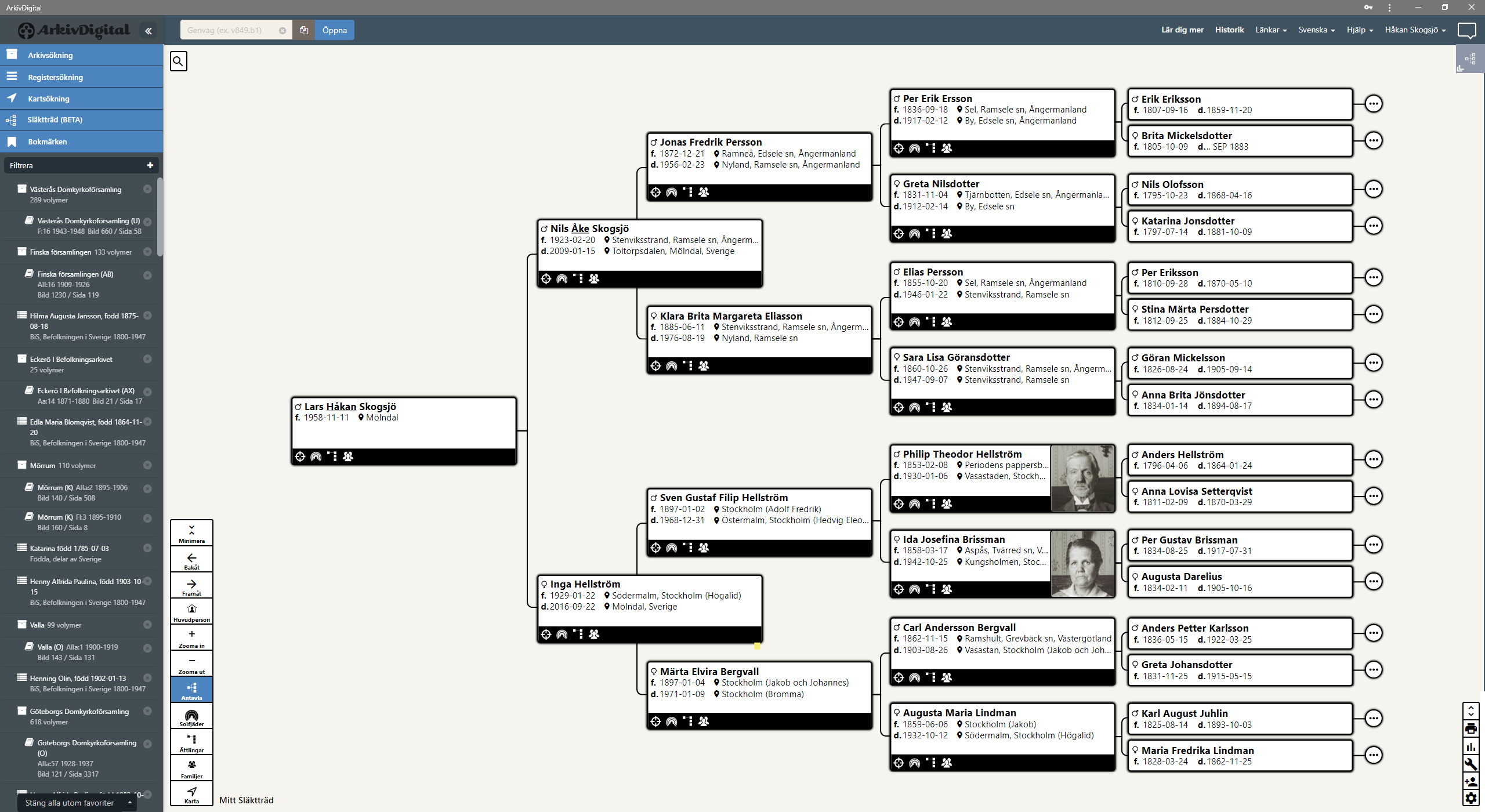
Screenshot to show users can build their own family tree on the Arkiv Digital website, either manually or by uploading a gedcom file. Each person can then be linked to matching archival records and name index records in the entire Arkiv Digital corpus.

In November 2019, Arkiv Digital added the feature of creating cloud-based family trees, manually or by uploading a gedcom file. The purpose of this was to connect subscribers’ genealogical research directly with the company's digitized historical records and index entries.

=== Book publishing ===
In 2019, Arkiv Digital published Håkan Skogsjö's handbook Släktforskning på riktigt, with an expanded edition 2021 and a further expanded one in 2024. For English-speaking researchers, an English version titled Explore your Swedish heritage, was released in 2020, followed by an expanded edition in 2023. The handbook focuses on Arkiv Digital's digitized archival materials and name indexes while also describing traditional archives and research methodology.

=== AI technology? ===
In 2023, Arkiv Digital began exploring whether AI technology could be used to transcribe older handwritten texts, since many young people struggle to decipher handwritten texts even from the 1900s.
