= Baron Fock =

Swedish peerage title

- Creation date: 20 July 1815
- Created by: Charles XIII
- First holder: Berndt Wilhelm Fock, 1st Baron Fock
- Remainder to: Heirs male of the body of the first baron

Baron Fock (Swedish: Friherre Fock), is a title in the Peerage of Sweden. It was created in 1815 for Bernt Wilhelm Fock, a member of the Fock family.
