= Ullervad =

- Location within Västra Götaland Location within Sweden
- Coordinates: 58°40′N 13°52′E
- Country: Sweden
- Province: Västergötland
- County: Västra Götaland County
- Municipality: Mariestad Municipality

Area
  - Total: 1.22 km^{2} (0.47 sq mi)

Population (31 December 2010)
  - Total: 935
  - Density: 768/km^{2} (1,990/sq mi)
- Time zone: UTC+1 (CET)
  - Summer (DST): UTC+2 (CEST)

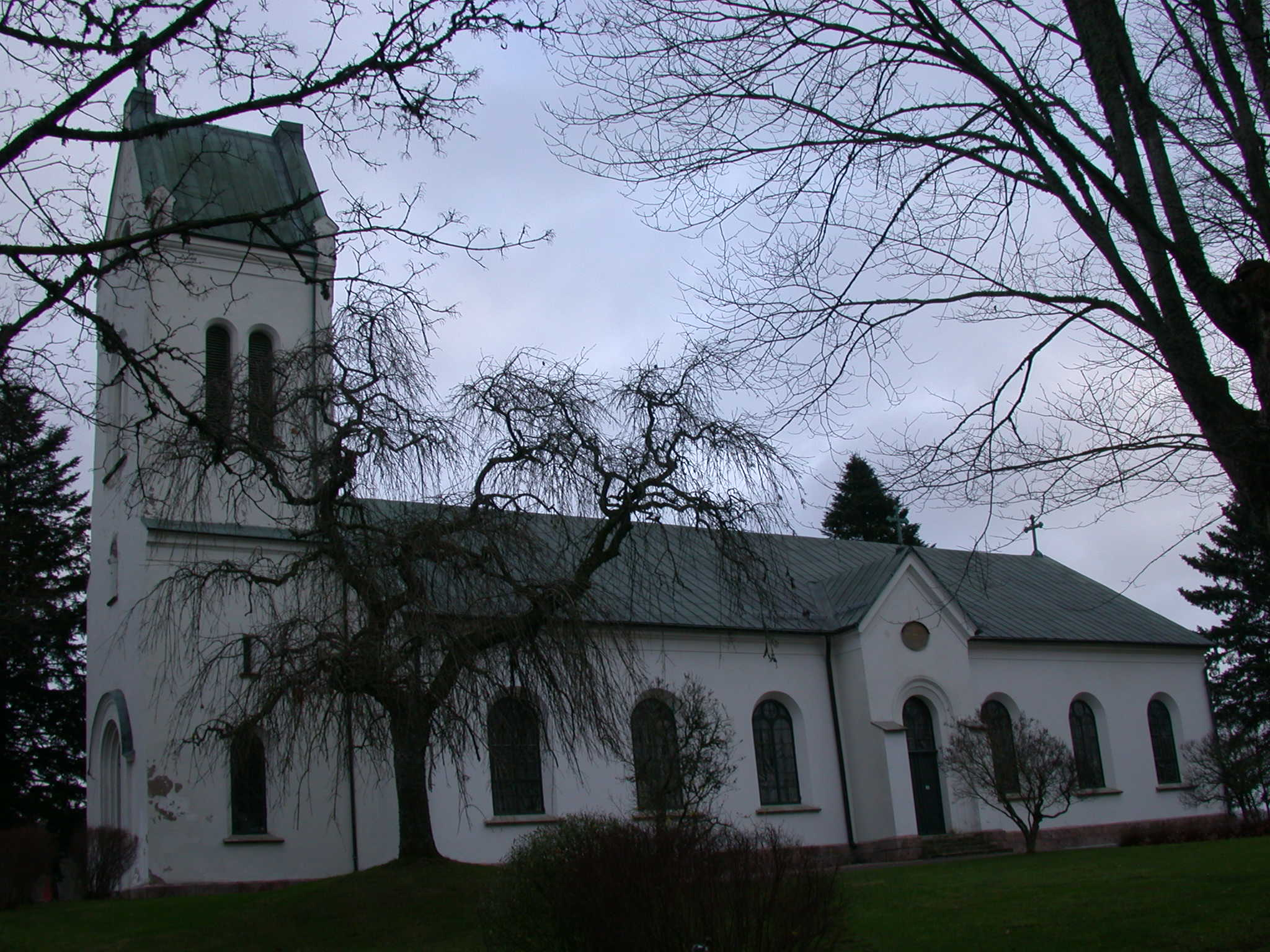
Ullervad Church, Mariestad, Sweden, 2006.

Ullervad (Swedish pronunciation: [ˈɵ̂ˌlːærva]) is a locality situated in Mariestad Municipality, Västra Götaland County, Sweden. It had 935 inhabitants in 2010.
