= Budgetpromenaden =

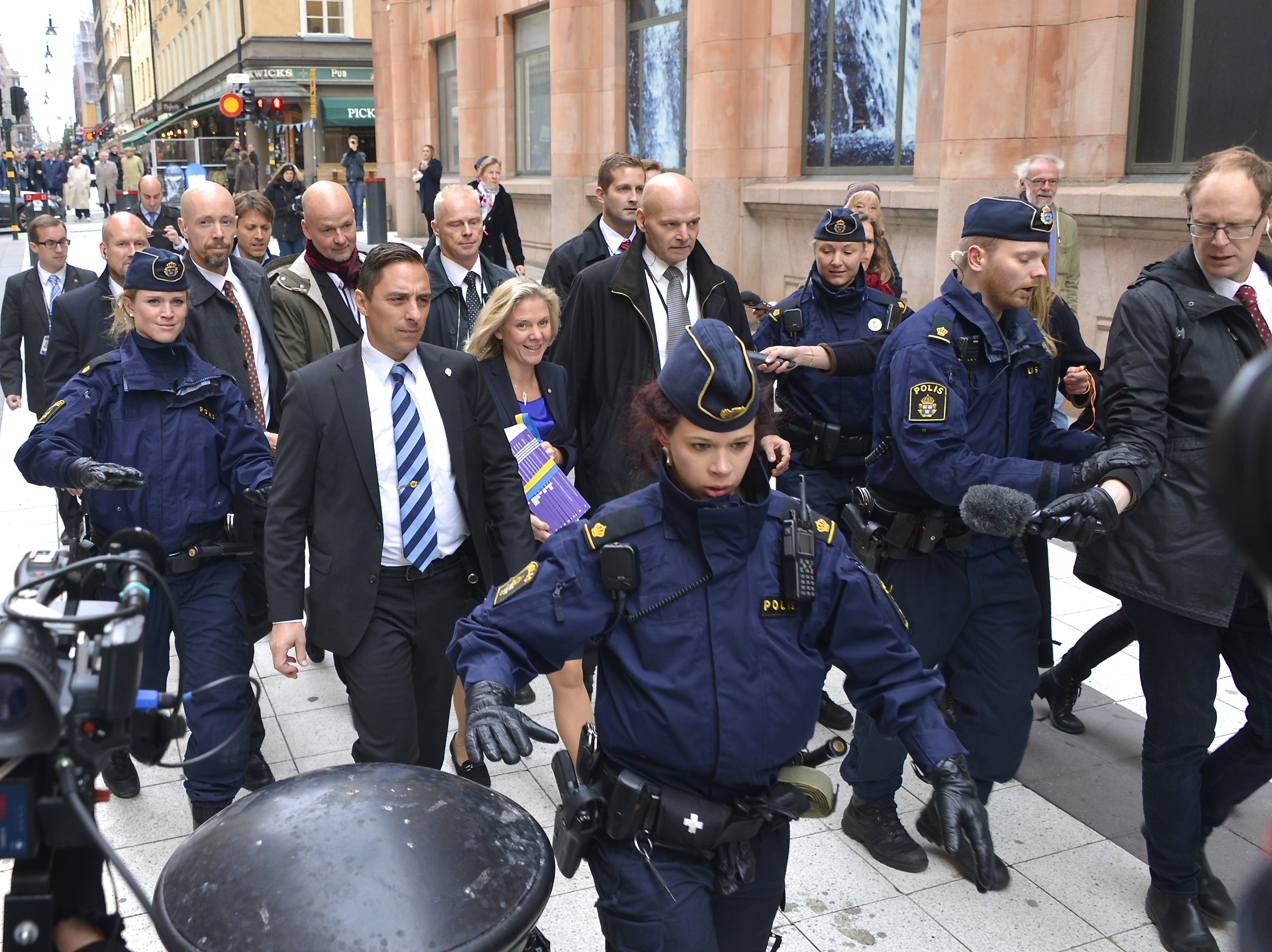
- Finance minister (later Prime Minister) Magdalena Andersson carrying the fall budget bill to the parliament on the 23 October 2014.
- Date: April (spring budget); September–October (fall budget)
- Location: Stockholm, Sweden
- Type: Political event

Budgetpromenaden, or the budget walk, is a traditional biannual procession where the Swedish finance minister walks with a copy of the budget bill from the Ministry of Finance to the Riksdag (the Parliament), a distance of 400 metres (440 yd).

The minister is followed by a large gathering of journalists and various political activists and is usually given extensive media coverage. Sometime minor incidents occur, like in April 2001 when a 21-year-old threw a cake on then finance minister Bosse Ringholm.

The physical budget bill has traditionally been delivered in paper form, called "den nådiga luntan" (English: "the gracious tome"). Later social democratic governments have made a point of using digital storage media such as CD's from 1996, and later flash drives. When Sweden got a center-right government in 2006 the new finance minister Anders Borg returned to paper tomes. During 2017's budget walk, finance minister Magdalena Andersson carried a tome of 3 906 pages that weighed 10.5 kilograms (23 lb).

== Notable budget walks ==
- 20 September 1999 - Bosse Ringholm's first budget bill delivered as both CD and paper tome.
- 17 April 2001 - A 21-year-old throws a cake on Bosse Ringholm.
- 14 April 2005 - Pär Nuder's first budget walk, the budget bill is delivered as CD.
- 20 September 2005 - The CD is replaced with a USB flash drive, that Nuder carries in a blue ribbon around his neck.
- 16 October 2006 - Anders Borg delivers his first budget bill as paper tomes in purple binders.
- 23 October 2014 - Magdalena Andersson delivers her first budget bill.
- 8 November 2022 - Elisabeth Svantesson delivers her first budget bill.

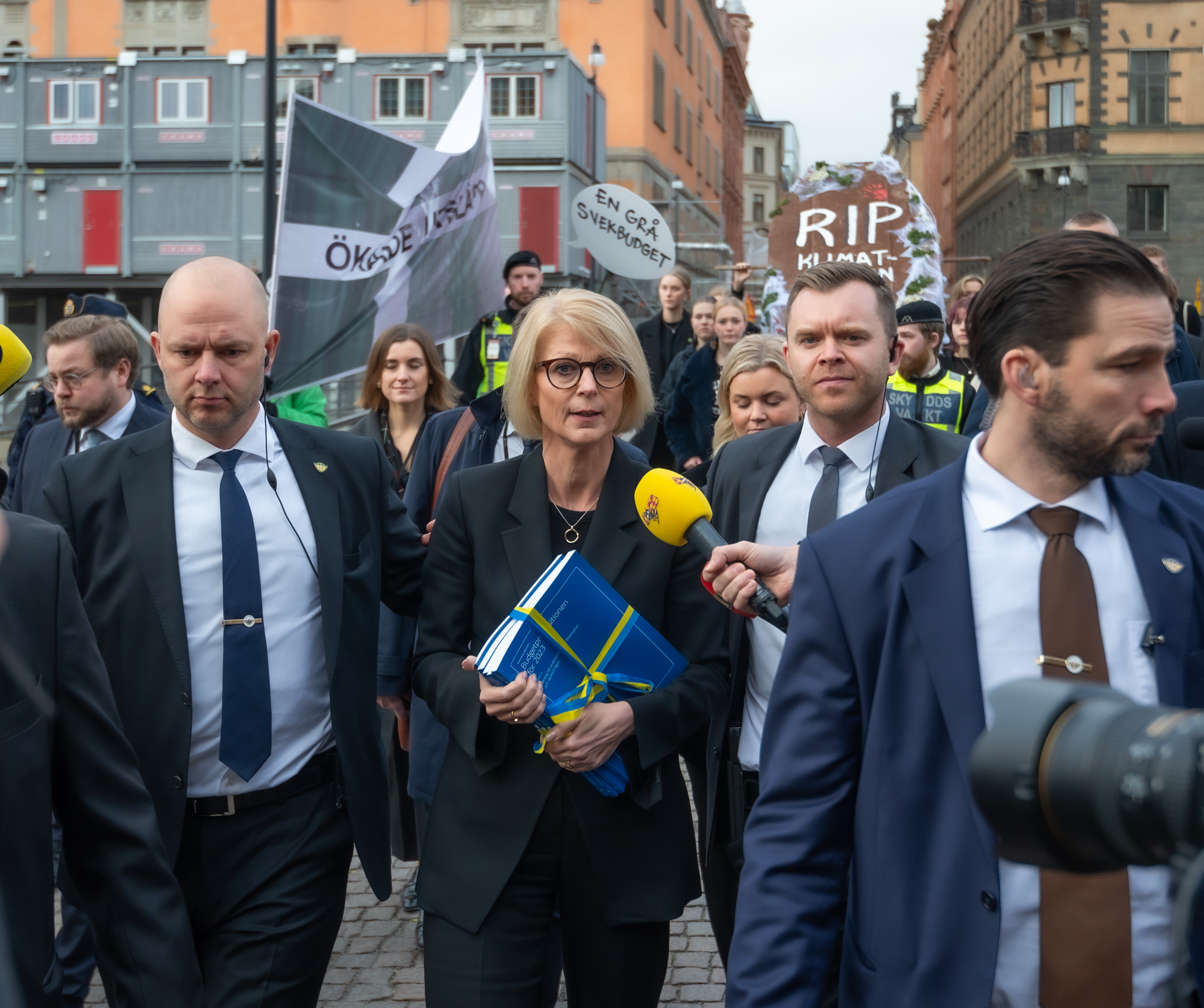
Finance Minister Elisabeth Svantesson delivers her first budget
