= Sjötorp =

- Location within Västra Götaland Location within Sweden
- Coordinates: 58°50′N 13°59′E
- Country: Sweden
- Province: Västergötland
- County: Västra Götaland County
- Municipality: Mariestad Municipality

Area
  - Total: 0.85 km^{2} (0.33 sq mi)

Population (31 December 2010)
  - Total: 494
  - Density: 581/km^{2} (1,500/sq mi)
- Time zone: UTC+1 (CET)
  - Summer (DST): UTC+2 (CEST)

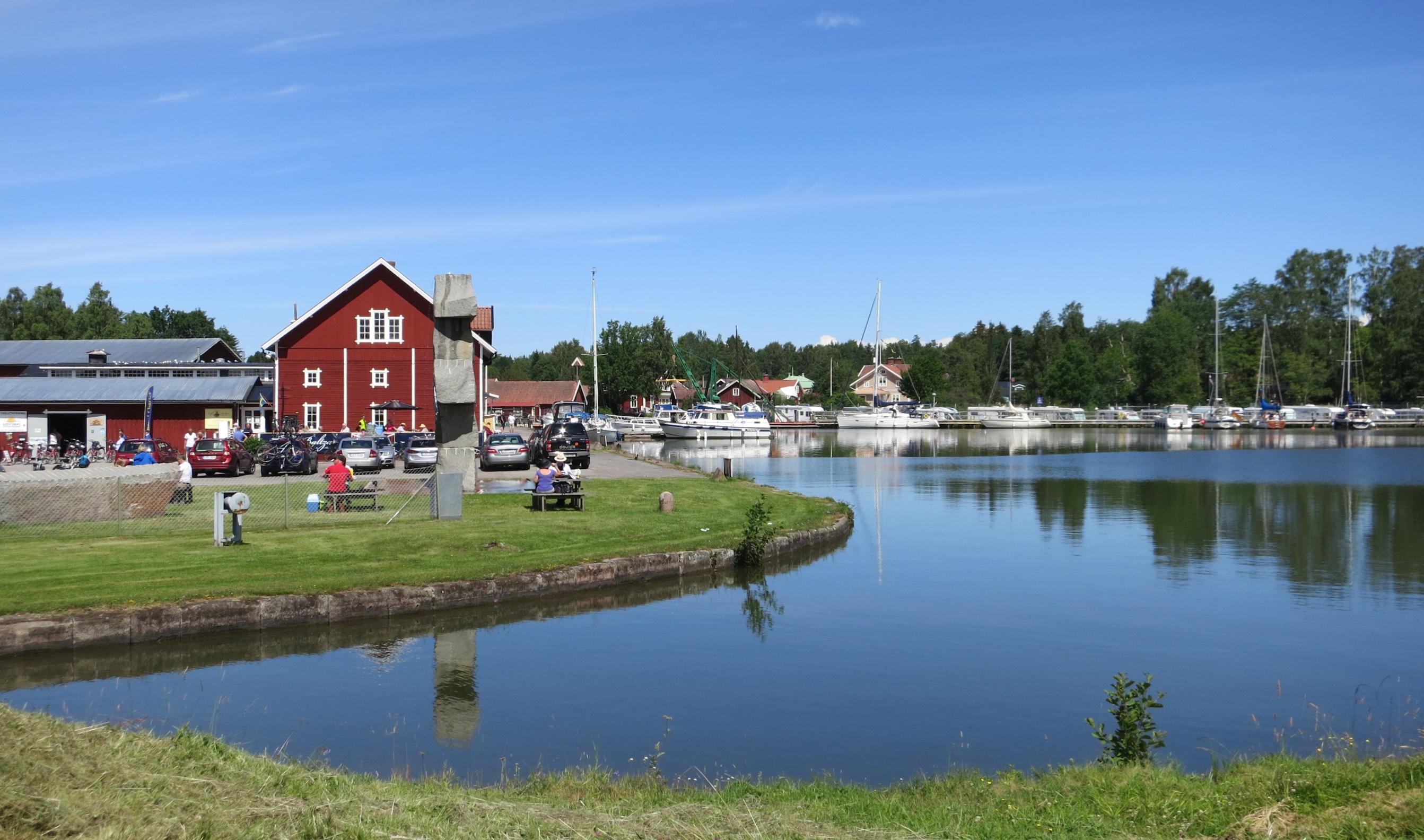
Sjötorp, Göta kanal

Sjötorp is a locality situated in Mariestad Municipality, Västra Götaland County, Sweden. It had 494 inhabitants in 2010.
