= Population registration in Sweden =

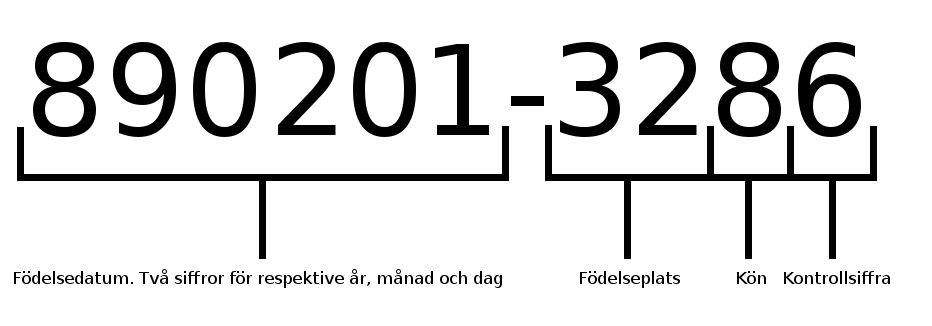
Personal Identity Number (Sweden)

Population registration in Sweden (Swedish: folkbokföring) is the civil registration of vital events (e.g. births, deaths, and marriages) of the inhabitants of Sweden. The data is kept in the population registry (folkbokföringsregister) and is administered by the Swedish Tax Agency (Skatteverket). The registry spans several centuries and is thus often used by genealogists.

One can order a registry extract about oneself, and one is entitled to obtain all records of oneself in the registry according to Section 26 of the Personal Data Act. The information is publicly available, except for people needing secrecy, such as people threatened with violence.

== History ==
The population registration in Sweden was originally maintained by the Church of Sweden, on the orders of the crown, and it remained the duty of the church until 1991. The oldest preserved records date from the early 17th century - though rolls of farmsteads, estates and local taxation with the names of peasants and nobles dwelling in the places in question have sometimes survived from the later Middle Ages on; these do not belong with the later program of population record keeping though, but are land/tax records. Complete archives are usually found from the mid 18th century onwards, unless records have been lost or destroyed by fire or the like.

The first decrees regarding person registration by local parishes came in 1608. A royal decree in 1631 required the names and dates of those born and dying to be noted in the parish registry books. The scope of the record keeping was expanded through the 18th and 19th century and the archival corpus today constitutes one of the most in-depth records of an entire national population over centuries to be found anywhere in the world, not least through the records of local hearings of people's knowledge of the catechism (husförhör, the record books are called husförhörslängder); these were held annually in every parish and often provide valuable information on families, on the state of education, living conditions, individual capacity to read or write and even individual personal traits of the locals whom the parish priest would question on the faith. When other churches and congregations than the Church of Sweden were legally recognized (notably through the Dissenter Act of 1873 and the Liberty of Religion Act of 1951) these other congregations and confessions were required to keep records of births, deaths, marriages and so on and to share these with public authorities if it were required.

The administration of the population registry was transferred from the church to the tax agency on July 1, 1991, due to the upcoming separation of church and state. The smallest geographical subdivision for this registry is the registration district.

As Finland was part of the Swedish kingdom from the high Middle Ages to 1809, and its laws and administration were recognized by the Tsar after the country had been ceded to Russia, the country shared the Swedish system of population records and these have developed on lines broadly similar to Sweden into the present age.

== Information registered ==
The following information of every person in the population registry is the following, if dates are applicable then they are stored as well. If a change is made, the old value is preserved also in the records.

- Name
- Personal identity number and co-ordination number
- Place of birth
- Citizenship
- Civil status
- Spouse, children, parents, guardians, and adoption data
- Address
- Property, parish, and municipality in which one is registered
- Immigration to Sweden
- Deregistration
  - Emigration from Sweden and address abroad
  - Death and place of burial

The address shall be where the person usually sleeps. For a person having two such places, the one where the family lives should be selected. People who have a temporary residence for less than six months do not need to register a movement to that address. All residence longer than that, including education and temporary work assignment, shall be registered as address (unless living regularly with the family).

== Digitized population registration records ==
The Swedish church archives have been digitized from black-and-white microfilms by the National Archives of Sweden and are available up to the 1930s in its Digital Research Room online. The Swedish company Arkiv Digital has digitized the same records using newly taken color photographs. Arkiv Digital's Befolkningen i Sverige (The Swedish Population) is a name index covering the entire Swedish population from 1800 to 1947, based on catechismal household books (husförhörslängder) and congregation records (församlingsböcker). The National Archives and Arkiv Digital have independently digitized nationwide censuses for selected years during the 1900s.

== See also ==
- LADOK, Registry of higher/tertiary schooling
