= Assembly of Nobles (Sweden) =

The Assembly of Nobles (Swedish: Adelsmötet) is the principal decision-making body of the House of Nobility. It convenes every three years at the Palace of the Nobility in Stockholm to make decisions regarding the management of the properties and foundations under the ownership of the House of Nobility, the affairs of the nobility and the budget of the House.

== Description ==
All heads of Swedish noble houses introduced into the House of Nobility are entitled to attend and vote at meetings, or to send a member of their family to do so in their place. The head of the family is always the eldest son of the eldest son and so on of whoever was first ennobled. The current statues of the House of Nobility prevents women from being head of a noble house, and therefore from participating in the Assembly. At the start of each Assembly attending nobles are given tokens by the secretary of the House of Nobility to confirm their participation.

There have been motions proposed to the Assembly to change the rules and allow for female members, for example at the 2016 Assembly when Carl Lagercrantz, since 1974 the representative of the Lagercrantz family, proposed that the heads of noble houses would be enabled to select a successor, regardless of their gender.

All attendees are entitled to table motions before the House. Proposed motions are first put before the Committee of the House of Nobility, a committee consisting of members selected by the assembly, which prepares and reworks the motions before they are presented to the Assembly itself.

The Assembly of Nobles also appoints the members and chairman of the Directorate of the Swedish Nobility Foundation, which is tasked with executing Assembly decisions between meetings.

Before the Representation Reform of 1866, when the Assembly acted as the decision-making body for the Estate of the Nobility, one of the four estates of the realm represented by the Riksdag of the Estates, it was chaired by the Lord Marshal. Since the Assembly was separated from the Riksdag, however, its chair has been styled titled as chairman. The chairman is however still seated in the Lord Marshal's chair during sessions of the Assembly. Before a chairman has been elected the meetings are chaired by the premier count, the highest-ranking count in attendance.

== List of chairmen of the assembly (since 2010) ==
- Carl Cederschiöld (2010, 2016, 2019)
- Baron Carl-Henrik Erhenkrona (2013)
- Peder Hammarskiöld (2022)
