= Abortion in Sweden =

The Abortion Act (1974:595)

Section 1
If a woman requests termination of her pregnancy, an abortion may be performed if the procedure is performed before the end of the eighteenth week of pregnancy and it may not be assumed that it will entail serious danger to the woman’s life or health on account of her having an illness. Act (1995:660).

Section 2
If a woman has requested an abortion or if the question of termination of pregnancy has arisen under the provisions of Section 6, she must be offered counselling before the procedure is performed. Act (1995:660).

Section 3
After the end of the eighteenth week of pregnancy an abortion may be performed only if the National Board of Health and Welfare has granted the woman permission for the procedure. Such permission may only be granted if exceptional grounds exist for the abortion.

Permission under the provisions of the first paragraph may not be granted if there is reason to assume that the foetus is viable.

Section 4
If an abortion in a case referred to under Section 1 is refused, the matter shall be immediately referred to the National Board of Health and Welfare for review. Act (1995:660).

Section 5
Only a person authorised to practise medicine may perform an abortion or terminate a pregnancy under the provisions of Section 6.

The procedure must be performed at a general hospital or other medical institution approved by the National Board of Health and Welfare. Act (2007:998).

Section 6
If it may be assumed that the pregnancy entails grave danger to the life or health of the woman, on account of her having an illness or bodily defect, the National Board of Health and Welfare may give permission to terminate the pregnancy after the end of the eighteenth week of pregnancy, regardless of how far the pregnancy has progressed.

If, due to illness or bodily defect of the woman, the termination of a pregnancy can not be postponed the procedure may be performed notwithstanding the provisions of the first paragraph and Section 5, second paragraph. Act (2007:998).

Section 7
The decisions of the National Board of Health and Welfare regarding permission for abortion or termination of pregnancy under the provisions of Section 6 may not be appealed. Act (1995:660).

Section 8
After an abortion or termination of pregnancy under the provisions of Section 6 the woman must be offered counselling. The person in charge at the hospital or health care facility where the procedure has been performed must ensure that such an offer is made. Act (1995:660).

Section 9
Any person who, without being authorised to practise medicine, intentionally performs an abortion on another person shall be fined or imprisoned for a maximum of one year for illegal abortion.

If an offence referred to in the first paragraph is gross, a prison sentence of a minimum of six months and a maximum of four years shall be imposed. When assessing whether the offence is gross special consideration shall be given to whether the act was habitual or for profit or involved particular danger to the woman’s life or health.

An attempt to bring about an illegal abortion is punishable under Chapter 23 of the Penal Code.

Section 10
The intentional disregard by a medical practitioner of the provisions of Section 4 or, subject to Section 6, second paragraph, of Section 3 or Section 5, shall be punishable by a fine or imprisonment of a maximum of six months.

Section 11
The proceeds of an offence under this Act shall be declared forfeited, unless this is manifestly unreasonable. Act (2005:294).

Abortion in Sweden is legal on request up to the end of the 18th week of pregnancy. After that point, an abortion requires permission from the National Board of Health and Welfare, and is generally permitted only in cases involving serious medical indications. Abortion is not permitted if the fetus is considered viable, which generally means that abortions after the 22nd week are not allowed, except in rare cases where the fetus would not be able to survive outside the womb even if the pregnancy were carried to term.

Abortion was first regulated in Sweden under the Abortion Act of 1938, which permitted the procedure on medical, humanitarian, or eugenic grounds, including serious risk to the woman's life, pregnancy resulting from rape, or a significant risk of a serious inherited condition. The law was expanded in 1946 to include socio-medical grounds, and again in 1963 to cover cases involving a risk of serious fetal damage. Because each case had to be assessed by a committee, approvals were often delayed until the middle of the second trimester. The current framework was introduced in 1974, when abortion on request was allowed up to the end of the 18th week of pregnancy.

== Legislation ==
=== Current ===
The current legislation is the Abortion Act of 1974 (SFS 1974:595). Under the Act, a woman may choose to have an abortion for any reason up to the end of the eighteenth week of pregnancy. After the 18th week, an abortion requires permission from the National Board of Health and Welfare (Socialstyrelsen). Such permission is usually granted in cases where there are serious health concerns affecting the fetus or the pregnant woman. Abortion is not permitted if the fetus is viable, which generally means that abortions after the 22nd week are not allowed. In rare cases, however, an abortion after the 22nd week may be permitted if the fetus would not be able to survive outside the womb, even if the pregnancy were carried to term.

Abortion is a largely settled issue in Sweden, and its legality is not a major subject of political controversy.

There is broad consensus in Sweden in favour of preventing unwanted pregnancies through the use of birth control. The primary policy goal is not necessarily to reduce the number of abortions, but to ensure that all children who are born are wanted. Statistically, the number of abortions follows the number of pregnancies. Compared with the other Nordic countries, Sweden has a relatively high number of abortions and a relatively low number of young parents, while the number of pregnancies in relation to the total population is broadly similar across the Nordic countries.

=== History ===
The Civil Code of 1734 formally introduced the death penalty for abortion, although there is no confirmed case in which the sentence was carried out. Legal attention was focused more on infanticide than on abortion, and abortion-related court cases were few. The reformed law of 1864 abolished the death penalty for abortion and replaced it with between two and six years of penal labour for both the person who had the abortion and the abortion provider.

During the second half of the 19th century, abortion-related court cases became more common, and the issue entered public debate. A reform in 1921 replaced penal labour with fines or a shorter prison sentence without penal labour for the patient, while retaining the original penalty for abortion providers. Between 1929 and 1933, around 21 patients per year were sentenced for abortion, the vast majority of whom received suspended sentences.

Sweden's first law permitting legal abortions was passed in 1938. It legalised abortion only on a very limited basis, allowing the procedure on serious medical grounds, eugenic grounds, or in cases of rape, following assessment by the Royal Board of Health. From 1946, abortions could also be permitted on social-medical grounds.

During the 1960s, Swedish society underwent a gradual liberalisation in attitudes towards sexuality and abortion, which contributed, among other factors, to an increase in the number of approved abortions.

The current Abortion Act (SFS 1974:595, later amended in 1995 and 2007) entered into force on 1 January 1975. It permits abortion at the request of the pregnant woman until the 18th week of pregnancy, and thereafter only in cases involving strong indications of medical risk. After the 18th week, abortions may be performed only after assessment by the National Board of Health and Welfare.

In 1989, the Board issued general advice on the implementation of the law (SOSFS 1989:6). From 1 September 2004, this was replaced by new advice and policy guidance (SOSFS 2004:4).

Since 1 January 2008, foreign patients, including asylum applicants, non-permanent residents, and people not registered in Sweden, have been allowed to obtain abortions in the country. In 2009, 132 such abortions were performed in Sweden. The National Board of Health and Welfare described this as a comparatively small number in relation to the total number of abortions.

== Statistics ==
The National Board of Health and Welfare is Sweden's central national authority for social services, public health, and health care. Its responsibilities include evaluating and monitoring abortions performed in Sweden, as well as establishing standards through regulations and general advice. The Board is also responsible for collecting and publishing official national statistics on abortions. Until 1995, these reports were published by Statistics Sweden.

Statistical reports are published annually and are based on data from all clinics and hospitals where abortions are performed. The data collected include the woman's age, previous pregnancies and abortions, the length of the pregnancy at the time of the abortion, the method of abortion, and where the abortion was performed.

One of the National Board of Health and Welfare's main purposes in publishing these reports is to measure changes and trends over time. Statistics on legal abortions extend back to 1955 and, from 1975 onward, data on rates for different age groups are available. Since 1985, the woman's home municipality has also been recorded.

=== Trends ===
Percentage of conceptions aborted in Sweden

The number of induced abortions performed in Sweden increased markedly each year from the early 1960s, but soon levelled off after the liberalization of abortion law in 1975. It is not possible to determine whether the increase recorded after the Abortion Act of 1974 reflected actual circumstances or bias resulting from a greater willingness to report abortions after legalization. Since 1975, the total annual number of cases has averaged between 30,000 and 38,000 abortions.

Abortion rates by age group have changed over time. In 1975, the rate among teenagers was 30 per 1,000 women, while the rate among women aged 20 to 24 was 27 per 1,000. Since 1977, however, the reverse has been true, with fewer abortions performed among teenagers than among women aged 20 to 24. The abortion rate among teenagers was around 11 per 1,000 women in 2018, half the rate recorded in 2009.

Most abortions in Sweden are performed on women aged 25–29, followed by women aged 20–24, 30–34, 35–39, 15–19 (teenage abortions), and 40–44. Before the age of thirty, many women have not established a family life, and abortion is more common in this age group. Among younger age groups, multiple sex partners, lower desire for parenthood, ongoing studies, and recent entry into the labour market may influence the decision to have an abortion.

Abortion rates in Sweden vary widely by region. The highest rates of teenage abortions are recorded in Gotland and in the metropolitan areas of Stockholm and Gothenburg, while the lowest incidences are in the counties of Blekinge, Kronoberg, and Jönköping.

In 2018, 84 percent of induced abortions were performed before the end of the 9th week of pregnancy and 57 percent before the end of the 7th week, compared with 55 and 10 percent, respectively, in 1994. Medical abortions accounted for 93 percent of all abortions.

Statistics
Abortions	Abortions per 1000 women (aged 15–44)	Total live births	Live births per 1000 women (aged 15–44)	Abortions per 100 known pregnancies	Year
4 562	3.1	107 305	72.8	4.0	1955
2 792	1.9	102 219	68.4	2.6	1960
6 209	4.0	122 806	79.2	4.8	1965
16 100	10.2	110 150	69.8	12.7	1970
19 250	12.1	114 484	72.1	14.3	1971
24 170	15.2	112 273	70.6	17.6	1972
25 990	16.3	109 663	68.9	19.0	1973
30 636	19.2	109 864	68.8	21.7	1974
32 526	20.3	103 632	64.6	23.8	1975
32 351	20.0	98 345	60.9	24.7	1976
31 462	19.3	96 057	59.0	24.6	1977
31 918	19.4	93 248	56.7	25.4	1978
34 709	20.9	96 175	57.8	26.4	1979
34 887	20.7	97 064	57.6	26.4	1980
33 294	19.6	94 065	55.2	26.1	1981
32 602	19.0	92 706	54.0	25.9	1982
31 014	17.9	91 686	53.0	25.2	1983
30 755	17.7	93 508	53.9	24.7	1984
30 838	17.7	98 463	56.5	23.8	1985
33 124	18.9	101 740	58.1	24.5	1986
34 486	19.8	104 699	59.6	24.8	1987
37 585	21.4	112 080	63.7	25.0	1988
37 920	21.5	116 023	65.9	24.6	1989
37 489	21.3	123 938	70.5	23.2	1990
35 788	20.4	123 737	70.7	22.4	1991
37 849	20.0	122 848	70.6	22.0	1992
34 170	19.8	117 998	68.2	22.4	1993
32 293	18.7	112 257	65.1	22.3	1994
31 441	18.3	103 422	60.1	23.3	1995
32 117	18.7	95 297	55.6	25.1	1996
31 433	18.4	90 502	53.0	25.7	1997
31 008	18.3	89 028	52.4	25.8	1998
30 712	18.1	88 173	52.0	25.8	1999
30 980	18.3	90 698	53.6	25.4	2000
31 772	18.7	91 466	53.9	25.7	2001
33 365	19.6	95 953	56.4	25.7	2002
34 473	20.2	99 260	58.1	25.7	2003
34 454	20.0	101 018	58.8	25.4	2004
34 978	20.2	101 496	58.6	25.6	2005
36 045	20.6	106 013	60.6	25.3	2006
37 205	21.0	107 491	60.7	25.7	2007
38 053	21.3	109 373	61.2	25.7	2008
37 524	20.8	111 935	62.2	25.0	2009
37 693	20.9				2010
37 750	20.9				2011
37 366	20.7				2012
[data missing]	[data missing]	[data missing]	[data missing]	[data missing]	2013 (Note: Due to a pause in data collection, figures for 2013 are unavailable.)
36 629	20.2				2014
38 071	20.9				2015
38 177	20.8				2016
36 616	19.8				2017
35 782	19.2				2018

== Debate ==
Sweden has one of the most liberal abortion laws in the world. Abortion is not a highly controversial issue in Swedish society, and a majority of the population supports the country's abortion laws and related policies. A 2024 report by the Pew Research Center found that 95% of Swedish adults believed abortion should be legal in all or most cases.

Political debate has nevertheless occurred over issues such as the time limit for abortion and other aspects of abortion rights. Parties including the Christian Democrats and the Swedish Democrats have previously advocated stricter limits on late abortions, although they no longer do so. The Swedish Association for Sexuality Education has argued that many political claims about late abortions are based on misinformation and a lack of knowledge.

=== Abortion rights ===
==== Organizations ====
The RFSU supports abortion rights and identifies access to safe and legal abortion as one of its main international priority areas. The organization states that, in an equal and sustainable society, individuals should have the right to make decisions about their own bodies, sexuality, and reproduction.

=== Anti-abortion ===
==== Organizations ====
Människorätt för ofödda (MRO, Human Rights for the Unborn) is a politically and religiously independent organization. It seeks to promote the right to life of unborn fetuses through non-violent protests, the display of fetal images, and support for pregnant women.

Ja till livet (Yes to Life) is a non-profit organization that seeks to influence public debate on human dignity in relation to abortion, prenatal diagnosis, and elderly care. The organization aims to reduce the number of abortions by arguing that fetuses have human value.

Some religious organizations also oppose abortion. The Catholic Church teaches that human life begins at conception and that abortion should not be permitted unless both the mother and the child are in danger. The Catholic movement Respekt (Respect) states that it works to promote human life from conception to death, and opposes abortion and euthanasia, among other practices.

==== Ellinor Grimmark ====
In 2014, midwife Ellinor Grimmark filed a lawsuit against the health authorities in Jönköping County after she was denied employment because she refused, on religious grounds, to perform abortions or prescribe contraceptives. The case received financial support from Alliance Defending Freedom, a US-based Christian legal advocacy organisation that opposes abortion and has sought to restrict abortion access in Europe.

Grimmark's case was reviewed by the Swedish Discrimination Ombudsman and later heard by a district court, both of which ruled against her. The Swedish Labour Court also ruled against her, after which Grimmark took the case to the European Court of Human Rights. In 2020, she lost her case against the Swedish state, and in October 2021 the case was permanently closed when her request for reconsideration was denied.

== See also ==
- Swedish Association for Sexuality Education
