= Lugnås =

- Location within Västra Götaland Location within Sweden
- Coordinates: 58°39′N 13°42′E
- Country: Sweden
- Province: Västergötland
- County: Västra Götaland County
- Municipality: Mariestad Municipality

Area
  - Total: 0.90 km^{2} (0.35 sq mi)

Population (31 December 2010)
  - Total: 653
  - Density: 725/km^{2} (1,880/sq mi)
- Time zone: UTC+1 (CET)
  - Summer (DST): UTC+2 (CEST)

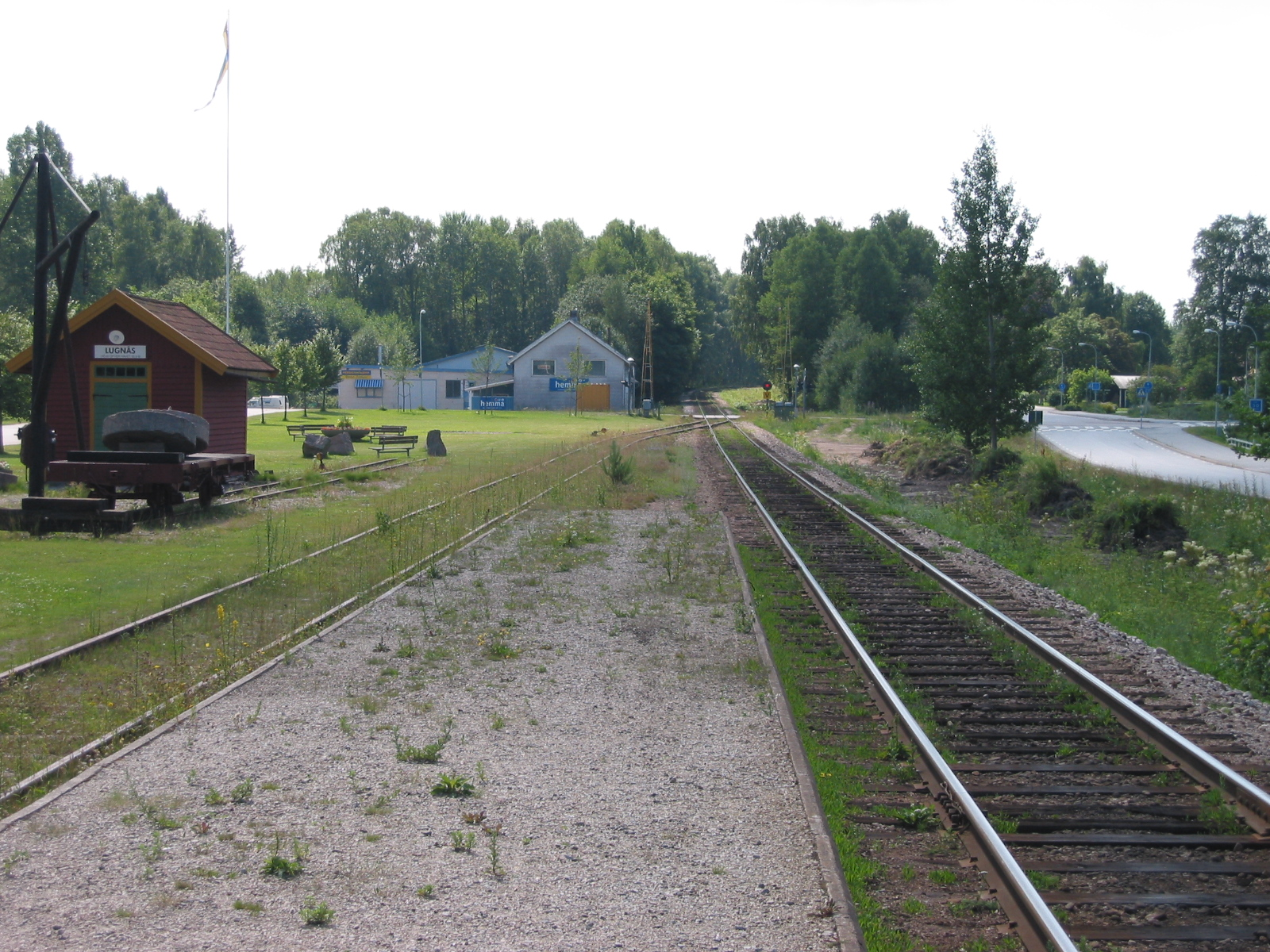
Lugnås station

Lugnås is a locality situated in Mariestad Municipality, Västra Götaland County, Sweden. It had 653 inhabitants in 2010.
