= Lyrestad =

Locality in Mariestad Municipality, Västra Götaland County, Sweden

- Location within Västra Götaland Location within Sweden
- Coordinates: 58°48′N 14°04′E
- Country: Sweden
- Province: Västergötland
- County: Västra Götaland County
- Municipality: Mariestad Municipality

Area
  - Total: 0.60 km^{2} (0.23 sq mi)

Population (31 December 2010)
  - Total: 479
  - Density: 803/km^{2} (2,080/sq mi)
- Time zone: UTC+1 (CET)
  - Summer (DST): UTC+2 (CEST)

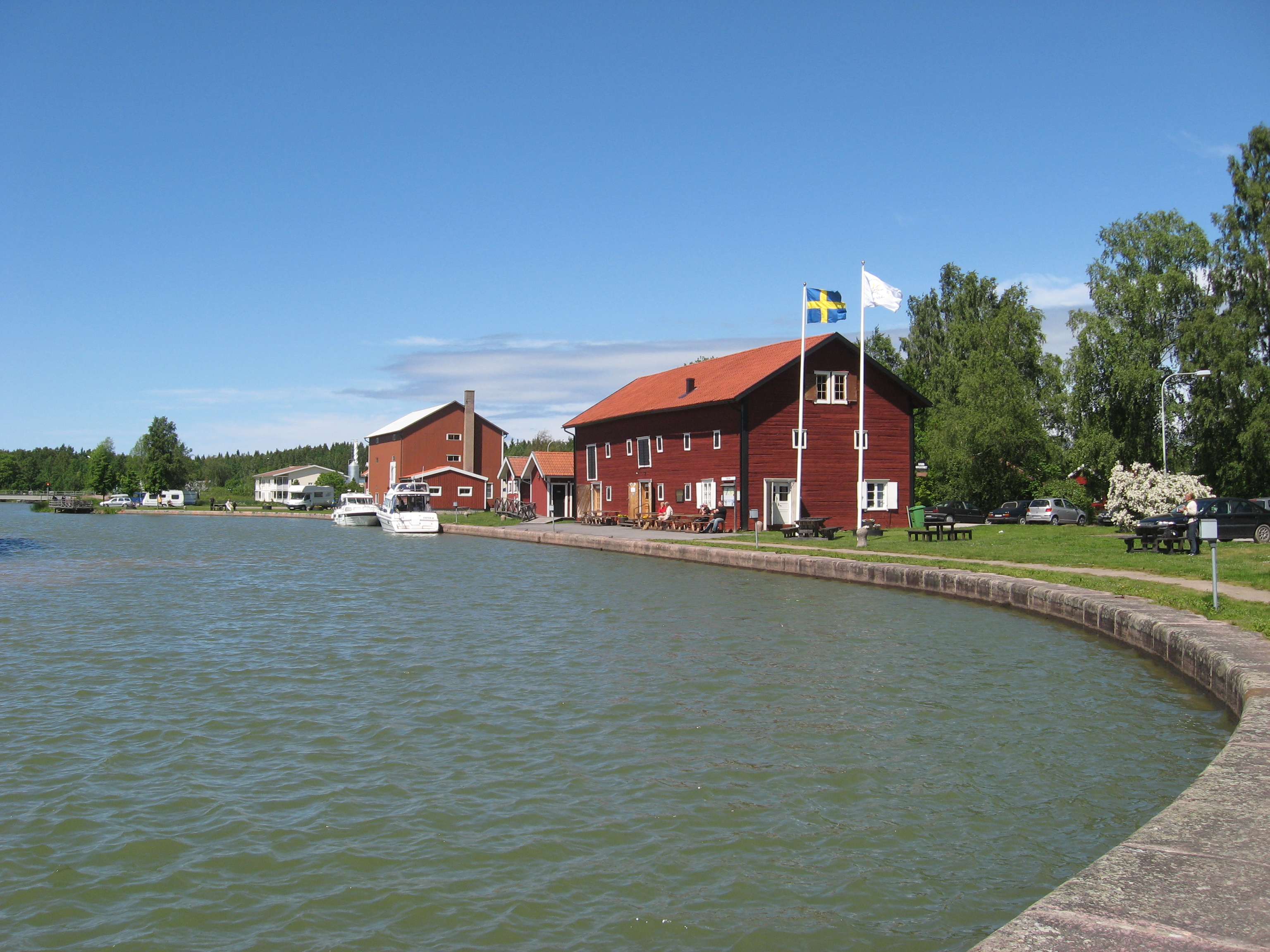

Lyrestad is a locality situated in Mariestad Municipality, Västra Götaland County, Sweden. It had 479 inhabitants in 2010. In Lyrestad the Kinnekullebanan railway crosses the Göta Canal.
