= Mariestad Municipality =

Mariestad Municipality Mariestads kommun
- Municipality
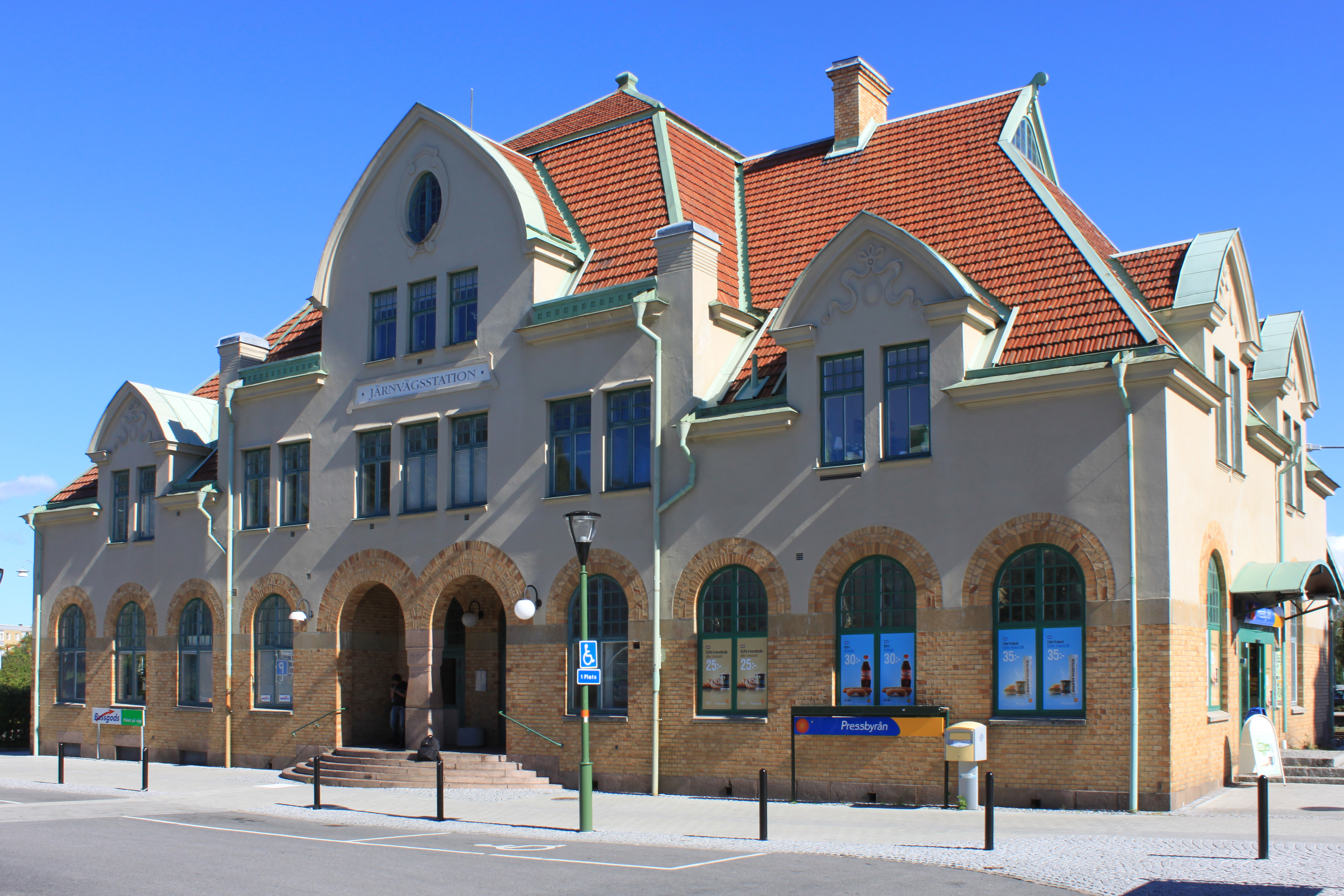
- Mariestad Railway Station

- Coat of arms

- Coordinates: 58°42′N 13°49′E
- Country: Sweden
- County: Västra Götaland County
- Seat: Mariestad

Area
  - Total: 1,503.1914 km^{2} (580.3854 sq mi)
  - Land: 601.1514 km^{2} (232.1059 sq mi)
  - Water: 902.04 km^{2} (348.28 sq mi)
- Area as of 1 January 2014.

Population (30 June 2025)
  - Total: 24,582
  - Density: 40.892/km^{2} (105.91/sq mi)
- Time zone: UTC+1 (CET)
  - Summer (DST): UTC+2 (CEST)
- ISO 3166 code: SE
- Province: Västergötland
- Municipal code: 1493
- Website: www.mariestad.se

Mariestad Municipality (Swedish: Mariestads kommun) is a municipality in Västra Götaland County in western Sweden. Its seat is located in the city of Mariestad.

The present municipality was formed in 1971, when the City of Mariestad was amalgamated with four surrounding rural municipalities.

== Geography ==
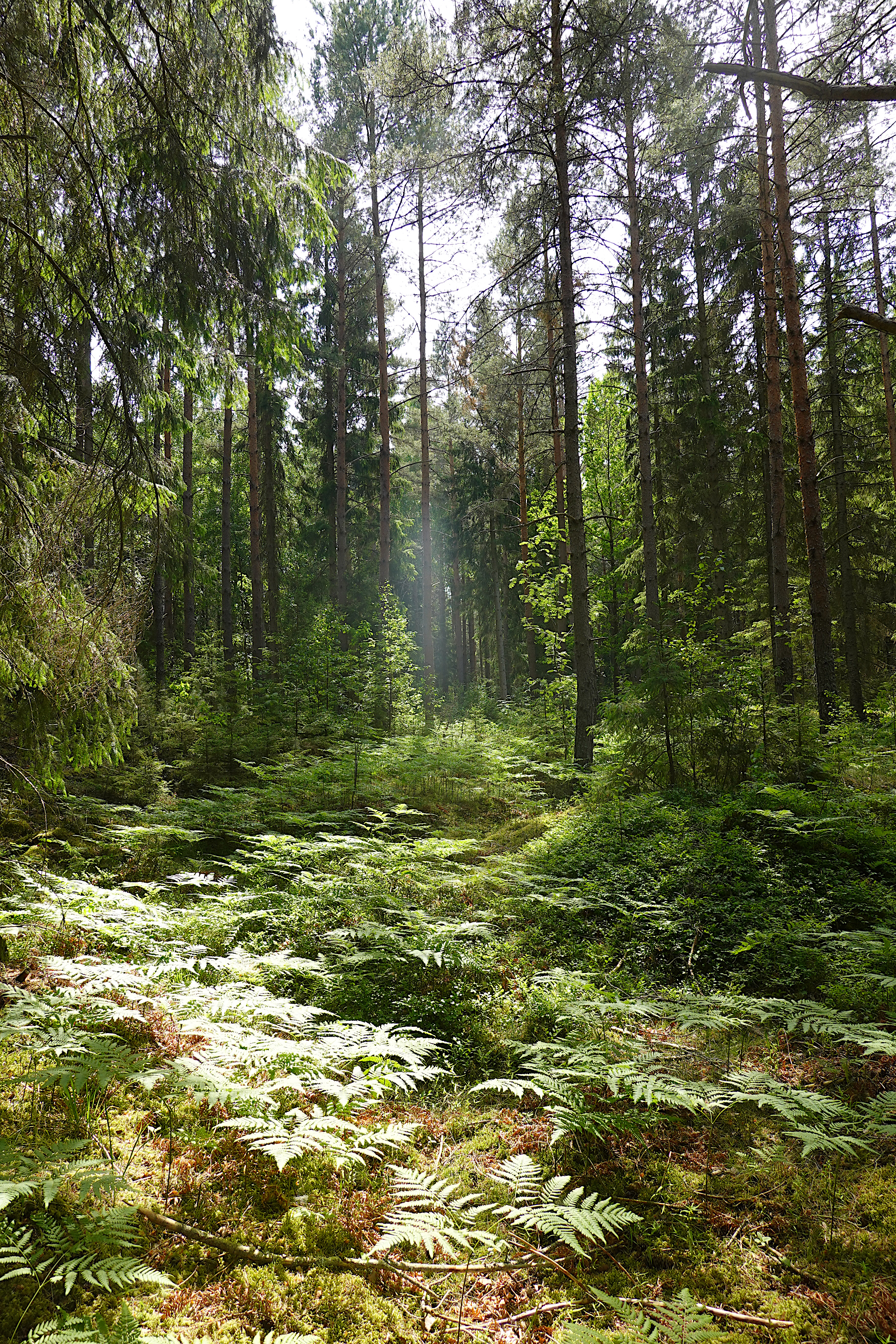
Forest in sunlight near Lake Vänern in the Mariestads kommun

Mariestad Municipality is situated on Lake Vänern and is visited by many tourists in summer. The largest fresh water archipelago in Sweden lies within the municipality. Torsö and Brommö are the two largest islands. North of the city, in Sjötorp, Göta Canal meets Lake Vänern.

=== Localities ===
Population centers in the municipality include:

- Lugnås
- Lyrestad
- Mariestad (seat)
- Sjötorp
- Ullervad

== Industry ==
The largest employers are Electrolux home products and Katrinefors bruk, a part of Metsä Tissue AB. SCA Packaging AB, RM Perfo AB and Jede AB are other notable companies in Mariestad. Within the IT industry Telia Partner AB and WM-data Infra Solutions AB are the two biggest employers. Just south of Mariestad, in Lugnås, you find Nimbus Produktion AB who manufactures Nimbus boats.

== Demographics ==
This is a demographic table based on Mariestad Municipality's electoral districts in the 2022 Swedish general election sourced from SVT's election platform, in turn taken from SCB official statistics.

In total there were 24,698 residents, including 19,407 Swedish citizens of voting age. 47.4% voted for the left coalition and 51.5% for the right coalition. Indicators are in percentage points except population totals and income.

Location	Residents	Citizen adults	Left vote	Right vote	Employed	Swedish parents	Foreign heritage	Income SEK	Degree
Location			%	%					
Bråten-V Skogen	1,770	1,314	54.9	44.1	76	66	34	22,509	33
Grangärdet	1,481	1,095	51.8	47.3	83	86	14	25,116	30
Hassle-Torsö	1,868	1,498	41.7	57.2	86	91	9	25,826	33
Högelid	1,935	1,494	49.6	49.6	90	91	9	28,812	43
Ladukärr	1,600	1,319	52.2	47.0	81	89	11	24,117	39
Leksberg	1,576	1,160	46.5	52.8	89	86	14	28,621	41
Leverstad	1,218	949	51.8	46.4	77	72	28	22,856	28
Lockerud-Ekudden	1,482	1,107	48.7	50.8	76	79	21	24,680	42
Lugnås	1,539	1,199	38.3	59.3	86	90	10	26,123	29
Lyrestad-Sjötorp	1,537	1,217	39.2	59.9	78	90	10	23,286	25
Madlyckan	1,580	1,284	48.8	50.1	80	86	14	24,713	35
Marieholm	1,601	1,265	56.2	42.6	74	73	27	21,259	31
Näset	1,270	1,145	44.0	55.4	78	85	15	24,009	38
Tidavad	1,207	926	40.7	57.8	86	95	5	27,200	35
Trädgården	1,741	1,458	50.7	48.1	75	86	14	21,421	37
Ullervad	1,293	977	44.0	55.3	89	94	6	27,473	36
Source: SVT

== International relations ==
=== Twin towns — sister cities ===
Mariestad Municipality is twinned with:

- Pakruojis, Lithuania
