= Ja till livet =

Swedish organization that campaigned against abortion

Ja till livet (Swedish, lit. 'Yes to Life') was a political and religious organization that opposed abortion in Sweden. It was founded in November 1991 by Mikael Oscarsson, a member of the Riksdag and a Christian Democrat since 1998. In the fall of 2017, the association merged with the Provita foundation, which has primarily been involved in issues related to freedom of conscience, and formed Föreningen Människovärde with a pronounced Christian profile.

The association's position was that fetuses have human value and should be protected according to human rights, which stipulate that everyone has the right to life. The organization, by their own estimate, had about 18,000 members in 2011.

== Operation ==
In addition to its work critical of abortion, Ja till livet also worked against active euthanasia and raised issues related to prenatal diagnosis and genetic engineering, which they believed risked undermining human dignity.

Ja till livet provided financial support to Livlinan, a Christian hotline for pregnant women or couples, founded by the Provita foundation. They also supported more information about the alleged psychological problems after abortions and risks of abortion.

Ja till livet had worked with the Sweden Democrats on several occasions, which was controversial.

== Presidents ==
- Mikael Oscarsson, 1991–1997 (as founder)
- Tomas Seidal, 1997–2009
- Gunilla Gomér, 2009–2014
- Stefan Swärd, 2014–2017
