= Ladok =

Swedish student administration system

In Swedish higher education, Ladok is a student administration system used in all Swedish universities and college universities. The acronym "Ladok" abbreviates the Swedish "Lokalt adb–baserat dokumentationssystem" ("Local Edp based documentation system"). It is a student registration and grading documentation system, not to be confused with the admission system and with various learning management systems used at the universities.

Ladok has been developed by the universities and has been controlled by Ladokkonsortiet ("the Ladok Consortium"). Each institution using the system has its own database which is limited to containing the results and registrations of its students; each handles its own service management on one of three certified service nodes, which are located in Umeå, Uppsala, and Lund.
