= House of Nobility (Sweden) =

Swedish nobility association and building

Coordinates: 59°19′33″N 18°03′55″E

Logo of the House of Nobility (Riddarhuset)

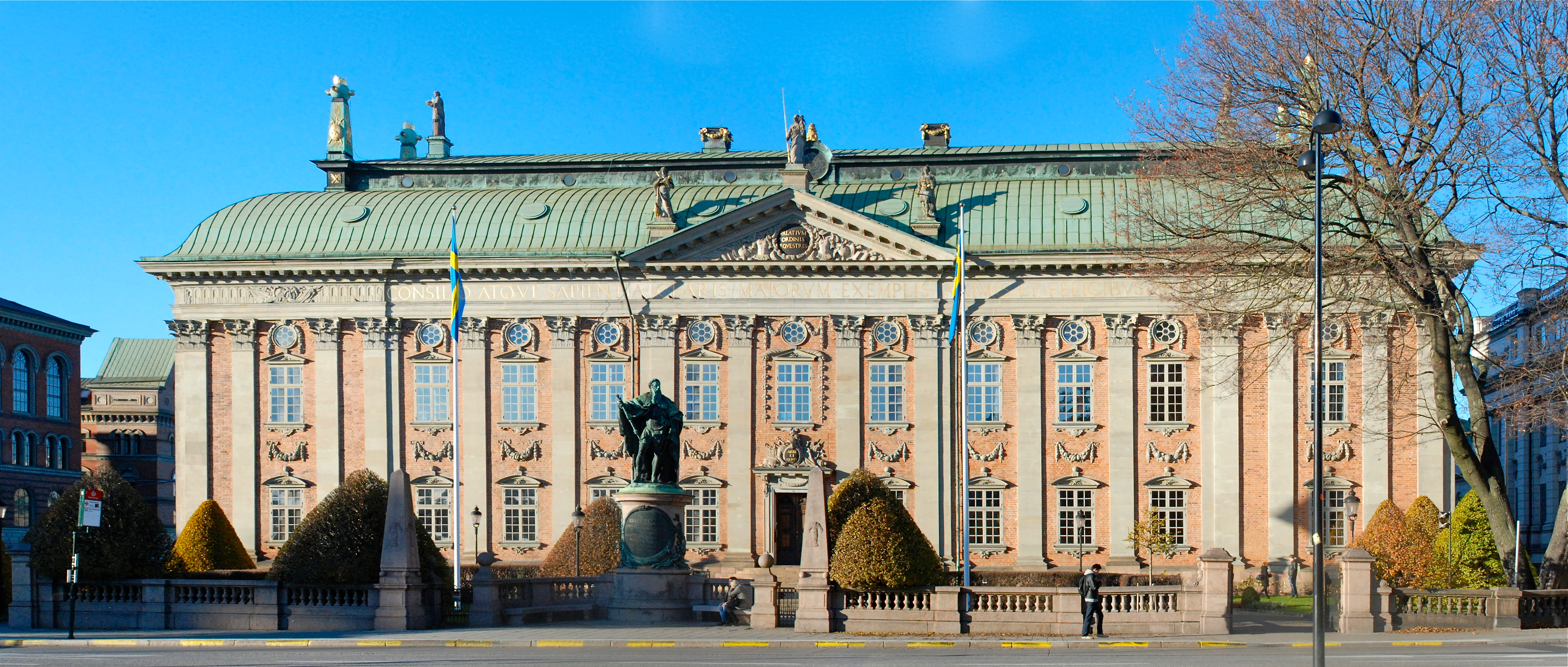
The House of Nobility, south end, with statue of Gustaf Eriksson Vasa. Inscription: CLARIS MAIORVM EXEMPLIS, "after the clear example of the forefathers."

The House of Nobility (Swedish: Riddarhuset) in Stockholm, Sweden, is a corporation and a building that maintains records and acts as an interest group on behalf of the Swedish nobility.

== Name ==
The name is literally translated as House of Knights, as the knights (Swedish: riddare) belong to the higher ranks of the Swedish nobility, sometimes also together with titles as count (Greve) and baron (friherre). All esquires are also represented in the corporation (most of the families are so called untitled nobility, obetitlad adel). This is a tradition from the Middle Ages when Sweden during the Kalmar Union only had one knight: Sten Sture.

== History ==
Between the 17th and the 19th century the House of Nobility was a chamber in the Riksdag of the Estates.

In the 18th century, the building was often used for public concerts. From 1731, public concerts were performed here by Kungliga Hovkapellet. Elisabeth Olin is believed to have debuted here in the 1750s, and foreign artists performed such as Elisabetta Almerighi, Giovanni Ansani (1772) and Rosa Scarlatti.

In 1866, the Parliament of the Estates was replaced by the new Riksdag (Parliament of Sweden). From then on, the House of Nobility served as a quasi-official representative body for the Swedish nobility, regulated by the Swedish government. Since 2003, it has been a private institution which maintains records and acts as an interest group on behalf of the Swedish nobility, its main purpose being to maintain old traditions and culture.

Since 1990 the House is a member of CILANE.

== Organization ==
The House of Nobility is governed by the House of Nobility Act. Currently it’s the 1866 Act governing the body, but the first such act was introduced as far back as 1626.

The primary decision making body of the House is the Assembly of Nobles (Adelsmötet), which convenes every 3 years to make decisions regarding how the nobility shall operate until the next meeting. The Head of each noble house which has been introduced into the house is entitled to attend and vote at the assembly. They may also send another member of their house to represent them.

Decisions taken by the assembly are then to be implemented over the next 3 years by the Directorate of the Swedish Nobility Foundation. This body is elected by the assembly and consists of a Chairman, a Deputy Chairman, 6 members and 3 deputy members. There is also a Chancery of the House of Nobility assisting the Directorate in implementing decisions of the assembly.

== Building ==
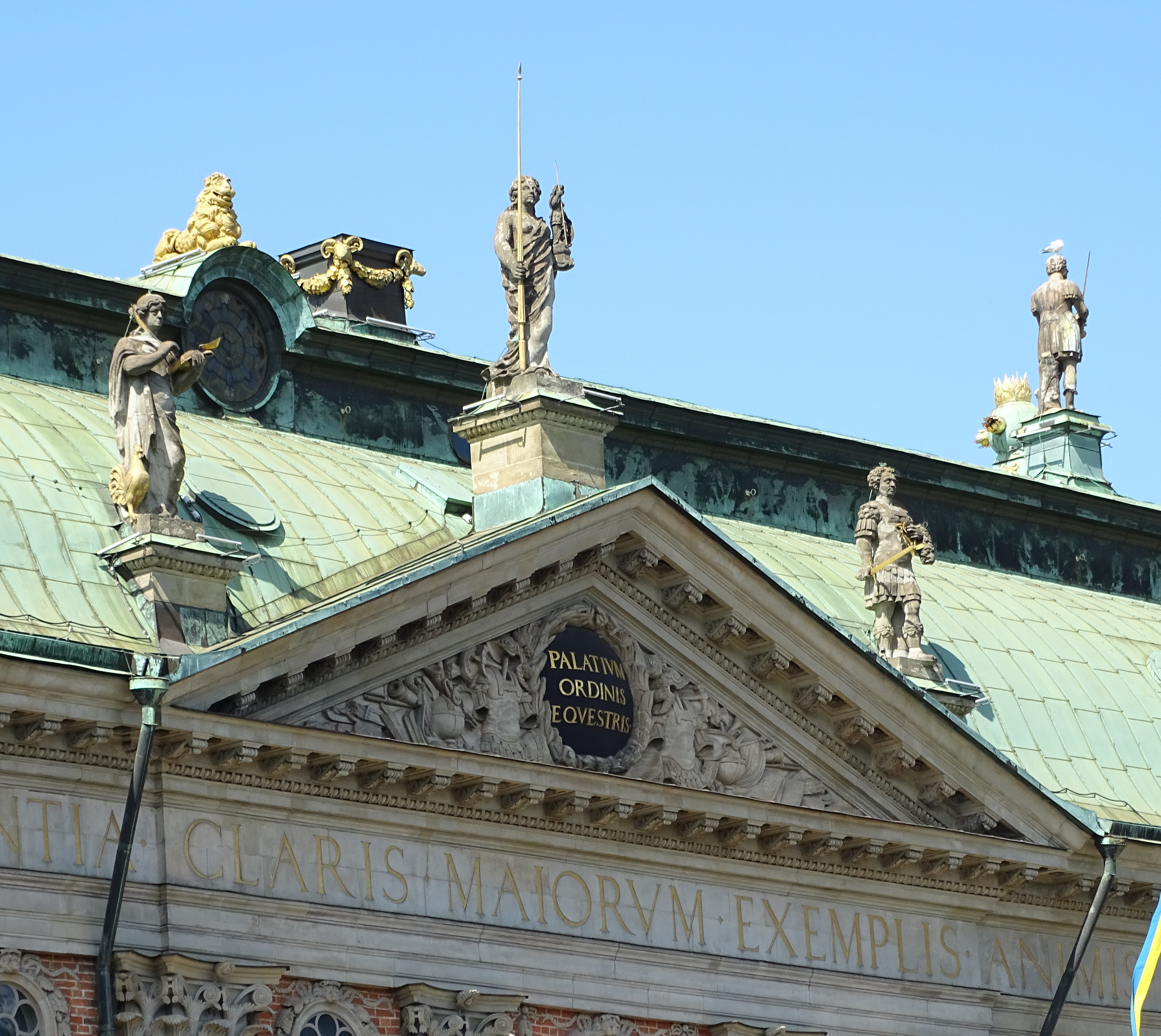
Pediment of Riddarhuset

The Riddarhuset is also the name of the building maintained by the corporation in Stockholm old town. In 1641, Lord High Chancellor Axel Oxenstierna acquired the plot of land for the construction of a "well-built and magnificent house to the glory of the Estates." Previously, the assembly venue had been a simple building situated next to the German Church. However, decades passed before this stately edifice was completed. During the construction period − spanning from 1641 to 1674 − various architects were responsible for the building. The French-born architect Simon de la Vallée started the planning of the building, but was killed by a Swedish nobleman in 1642. Subsequently, construction was continued by the German stonemason Heinrich Wilhelm and the Dutchman Justus Vingboons. The latter is said to have exerted the decisive influence on the design. Following his return to Holland, Simon's son, Jean de la Vallée, completed the construction in 1660. The expansion was not completed until 1773, with the erection of a bronze statue of Gustav I Vasa on the street-facing side of the building. Since then, however, the structure has undergone numerous renovations, both interior and exterior. The most significant alteration took place in 1870, when the building was fitted on its waterfront side with two pavilions serving as freestanding wings − a design conceived by the architect Adolf W. Edelsvärd. A statue of Axel Oxenstierna was subsequently installed within the resulting Court of Honor.

The south end of the building carries the Latin inscription CLARIS MAIORUM EXEMPLIS, after the clear example of the forefathers, and holds a statue of Gustav Vasa, the king of Sweden 1523–1560. North of the building is a park in which is a statue of Axel Oxenstierna.

The architecture of the old main library in Turku, Finland, was influenced by the Swedish House of Nobility.

== Digitized archive records ==
The older genealogical collections in the House of Nobility, spanning from the 1600s to the 1800s, have been digitized by the Swedish company Arkiv Digital.

== Gallery ==
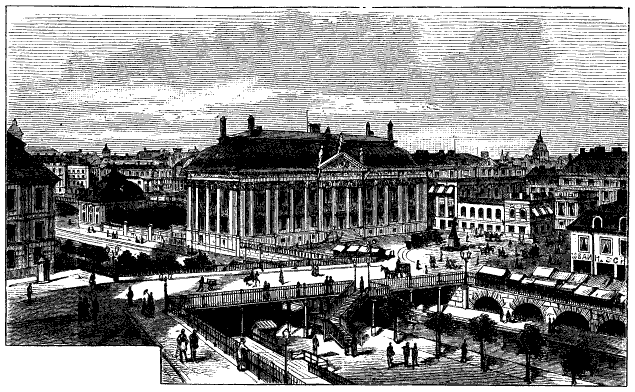
Swedish House of Nobility in 1885

The House of Nobility and the Riddarholmskanalen canal, c. 1895

Swedish House of Nobility during the Age of Liberty, in the 18th century.

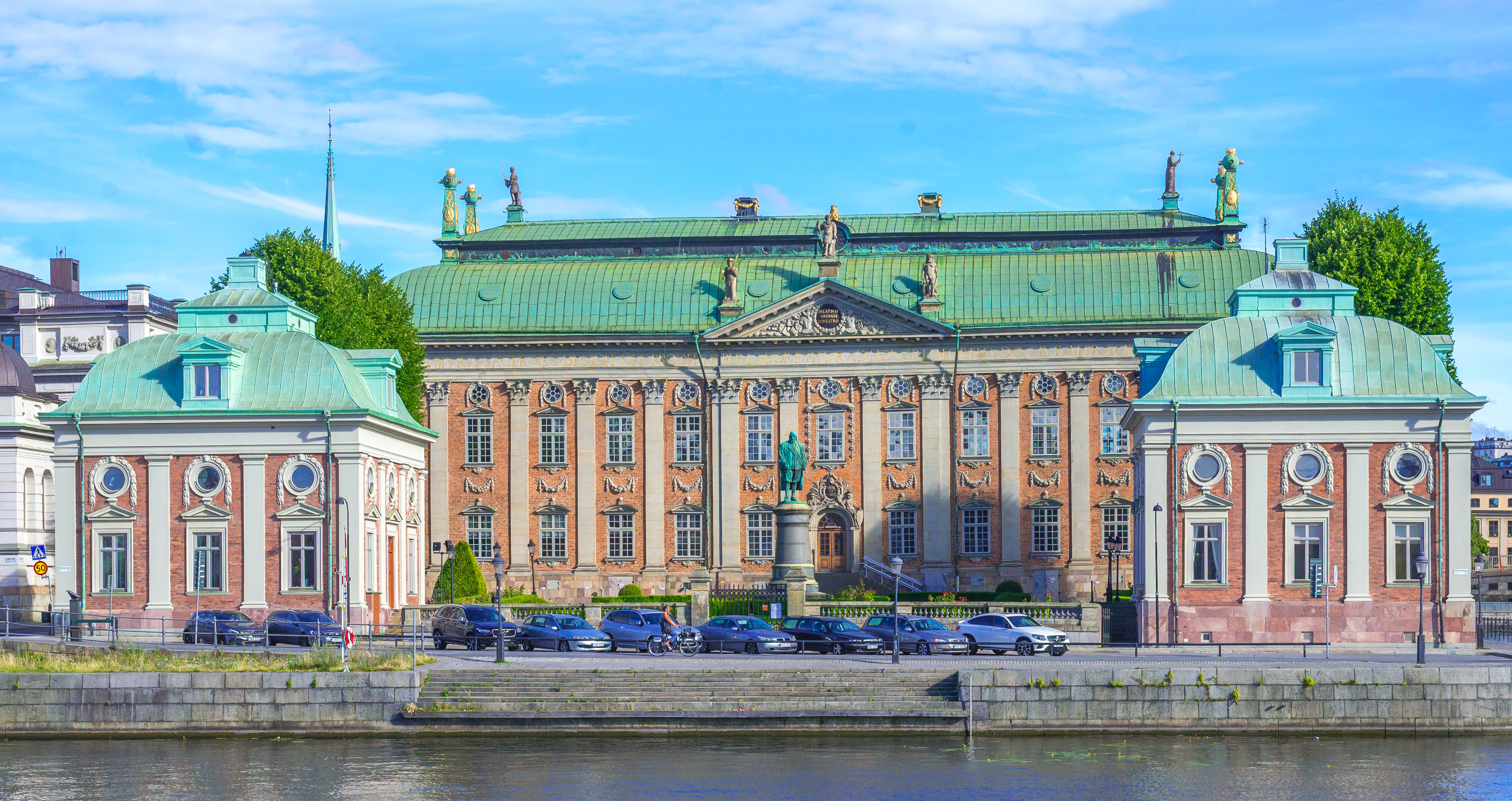
The Swedish House of Nobility, north end, with a statue of Axel Oxenstierna.

== Events ==
The Hall of Knights has hosted the annual Stockholm Culture Awards ceremony, an international arts and culture distinction, from 2018 to 2023.

== See also ==
- Architecture of Stockholm
- List of Swedish noble families
- Finnish House of Nobility
- Riddarhustorget
- Riddarholmen
- Turku Main Library
