= Ädelfors folkhögskola =

Swedish folk high school

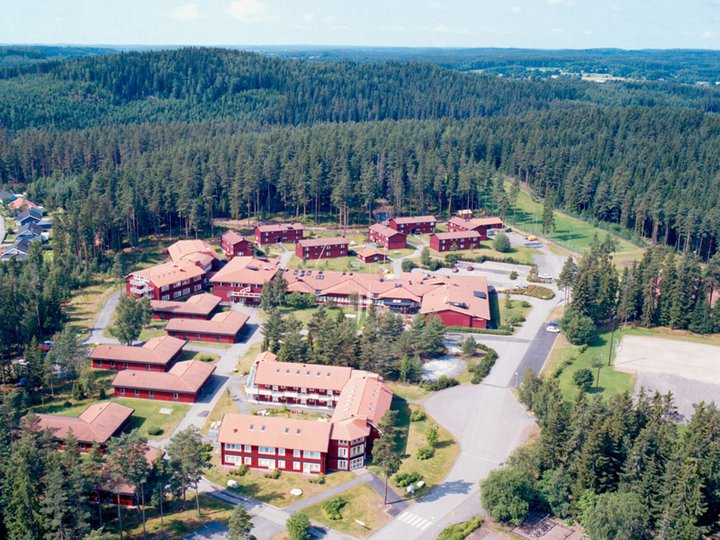
- Aerial photo over Ädelfors folkhögskola
- Type: Folk high school
- Established: 1957
- Students: About 300
- Location: Holsbybrunn, Vetlanda, Sweden; 57°26′10″N 15°11′50″E
- Website: http://www.adelfors.nu/

Ädelfors Folkhögskola (Ädelfors folk high school) is a Swedish folk high school which is specialized in teaching disabled people and people with special needs. The school is located in Holsbybrunn in Vetlanda. It offers courses in a variety of subjects, and its students come from all over the country.

== Folk high school ==
Ädelfors folk high school is run by the Workers organisation of southern Sweden; with about 300 students it is one of biggest folk high schools in Sweden. The school was built in 1957 in the town of Ädelfors in Vetlanda and was moved to the small village of Holsbybrunn in 1972.

The students live at the school during the week in dormitories, and often go home over the weekends. The dorms can accommodate about 100 students and include apartments adjusted for disabled people.

== Studies ==
Most courses at Ädelfors aim at training students for a tertiary education. These courses include the English language, natural sciences, and religion. The students studying journalism have practical experience with the local web-newspapers and reporting the school news and event using the school's radio and video equipment.

The art classes are accessible to persons with neuropsychiatric disabilities who would like to learn painting and sculpture. For those who wants to become a personal assistant, to which Swedish persons with severe handicaps are entitled as a right, there is a class. Ädelfors also has a variety of weekend-courses and summer courses such as "Human rights in an open society". A Russian-language course meets initially at the folkhögskola and then at the Russian city of Cheboksary.

== See also ==
- Katrinebergs folkhögskola
- Sankta Birgittas folkhögskola
- Södra Vätterbygdens folkhögskola
- Vårdinge by folkhögskola
