= Metsä Tissue =

Finnish paper manufacturing company

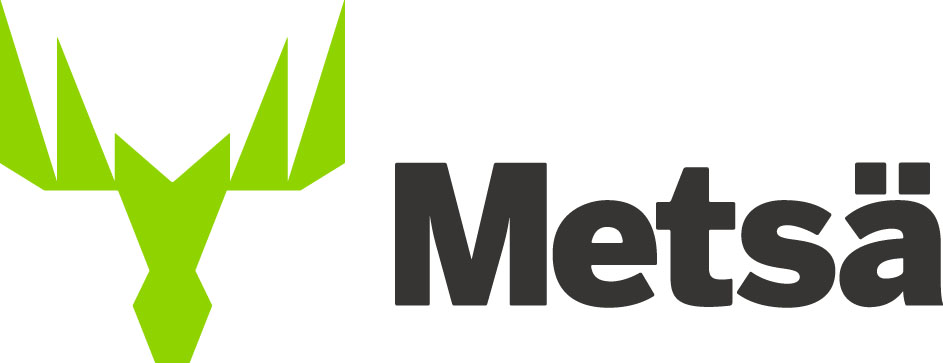
- Industry: wood
- Founded: 1868
- Headquarters: Espoo, Finland
- Key people: Ilkka Hämälä (Chairman), Esa Kaikkonen (CEO)
- Products: Tissue papers, greaseproof papers
- Revenue: EUR 1.1 billion (2019)
- Operating income: EUR 73.4 million (2019)
- Number of employees: 2,500 (end 2019)
- Website: metsatissue.com

Metsä Tissue is a Finnish company headquartered in Espoo that manufactures tissue papers and greaseproof papers. Metsä Tissue sells its products under brands Lambi, Serla, Mola, Tento, Katrin and SAGA.

Metsä Tissue is part of Metsä Group, one of the largest forest industry groups in the world. The company's operations in Russia ended in 2015.

== Locations ==
Metsä Tissue has a total of nine paper mills, all in Europe.

In Sweden, they have paper mills in Mariestad, Kvillsfors, and Pauliström. In Finland, Metsä Tissue has one mill located in Mänttä. In Germany Metsä Tissue has three mills located in Raubach, Kreuzau and Düren. Metsä Tissue also has mills in Krapkowice, Poland and Zilina, Slovakia.

In late 2025, Metsä Tissue completed one of the largest recent tissue sector investments in Europe by finishing a €370 million expansion and modernization of its Mariestad mill in Sweden. This project doubled the site's annual tissue production capacity to 145,000 tonnes and introduced extensive automation and energy efficiency improvements.
