= Skede =

Skede may refer to:

- Šķēde, suburb of Liepāja, Latvia
- Skede, Sweden, village in Vetlanda Municipality, Sweden
