= Ruda, Sweden =

Ruda
- Location within Kalmar Location within Sweden
- Coordinates: 57°07′N 16°07′E
- Country: Sweden
- Province: Småland
- County: Kalmar County
- Municipality: Högsby Municipality

Area
  - Total: 1.20 km^{2} (0.46 sq mi)

Population (31 December 2010)
  - Total: 613
  - Density: 512/km^{2} (1,330/sq mi)
- Time zone: UTC+1 (CET)
  - Summer (DST): UTC+2 (CEST)

Ruda is a locality situated in Högsby Municipality, Kalmar County, Sweden with 613 inhabitants in 2010. It is suffering from a steady population decline.

Near Ruda there is a VLF transmitter for the Swedish Navy. Even though it is not a tower this transmitter is often mistakenly referred to as "rudatornet" (the Ruda tower) by locals.

The Swedish national road 34 runs through Ruda connecting the village to E22 and Ålem to the south and Motala in the north. This road provides Ruda with economic stimulation. Many bypassers stop at the only gas station which also provides cooked food and other merchandise. Except for this shop there is also Konsum grocery shop. Kalmar Lans Trafik, the local bus company offer public transportation to and from Ruda.

There is a train track running from Kalmar, through Ruda and eventually to Linköping. At one time the train trafficking the track stopped in Ruda to leave and pick up passengers but this is not longer the case. Today the closest stop is in Högsby. The train station in Ruda is still intact but abandoned.

Ruda once was a thriving industrial town with many shops and industries, including Ruda glass manufacturing factory, an antenna factory (Antel) and a sawmill. The location of the sawmill was for a long time a sanitary danger for the inhabitants but a project starting in 2007 has cleaned up the area. Today a majority of the inhabitants work in close by larger towns such as Oskarshamn.
