= Emån =

River in Sweden

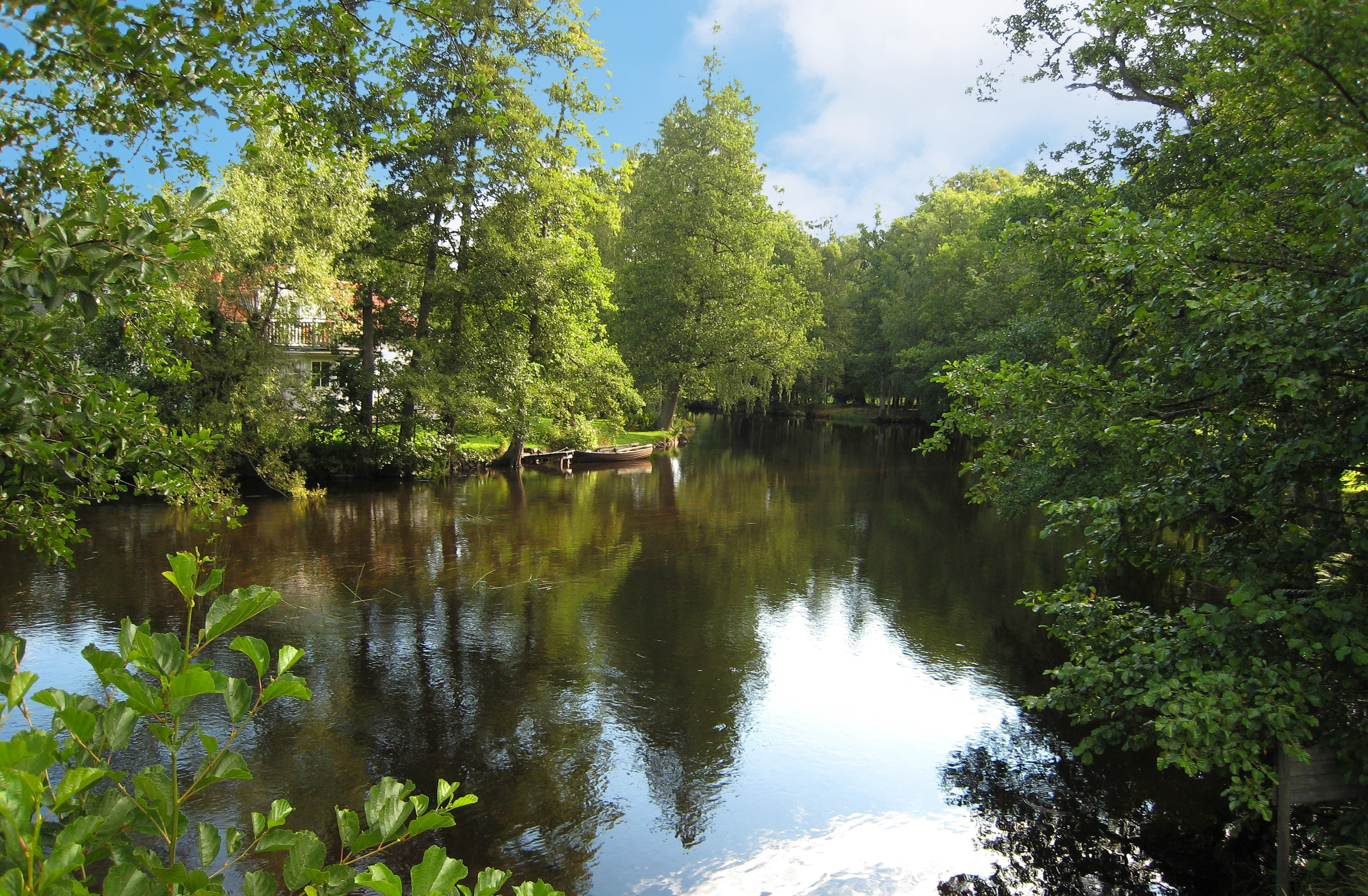

Location
- Country: Sweden

Physical characteristics
- Mouth: Kalmar Strait, Baltic Sea
  - location: Mönsterås Municipality
  - coordinates: 57°7′48″N 16°30′15″E
- Length: 220 km (140 mi)
- Basin size: 4,471.9 km^{2} (1,726.6 sq mi)
- Discharge
  - average: 30 m^{3}/s (1,100 cu ft/s)

Basin features
- Designation

Ramsar Wetland
- Designated: 14 November 2001
- Reference no.: 1118

Emån is a river in southern Sweden, rising just north of Bodafors in the highlands of Småland and running approximately 229 kilometers to the Baltic Sea just south of Oskarshamn.

Emån is popular among canoeists, as it is easily navigated and provides opportunities to experience Swedish flora and fauna up close.

Emån is the home to more than 30 species of fish and is prized among anglers for its very large seatrout.

Noteworthy settlements along the stream include Holsbybrunn, Kvillsfors, Målilla and Högsby.
