= Högsby Municipality =

Högsby Municipality Högsby kommun
- Municipality
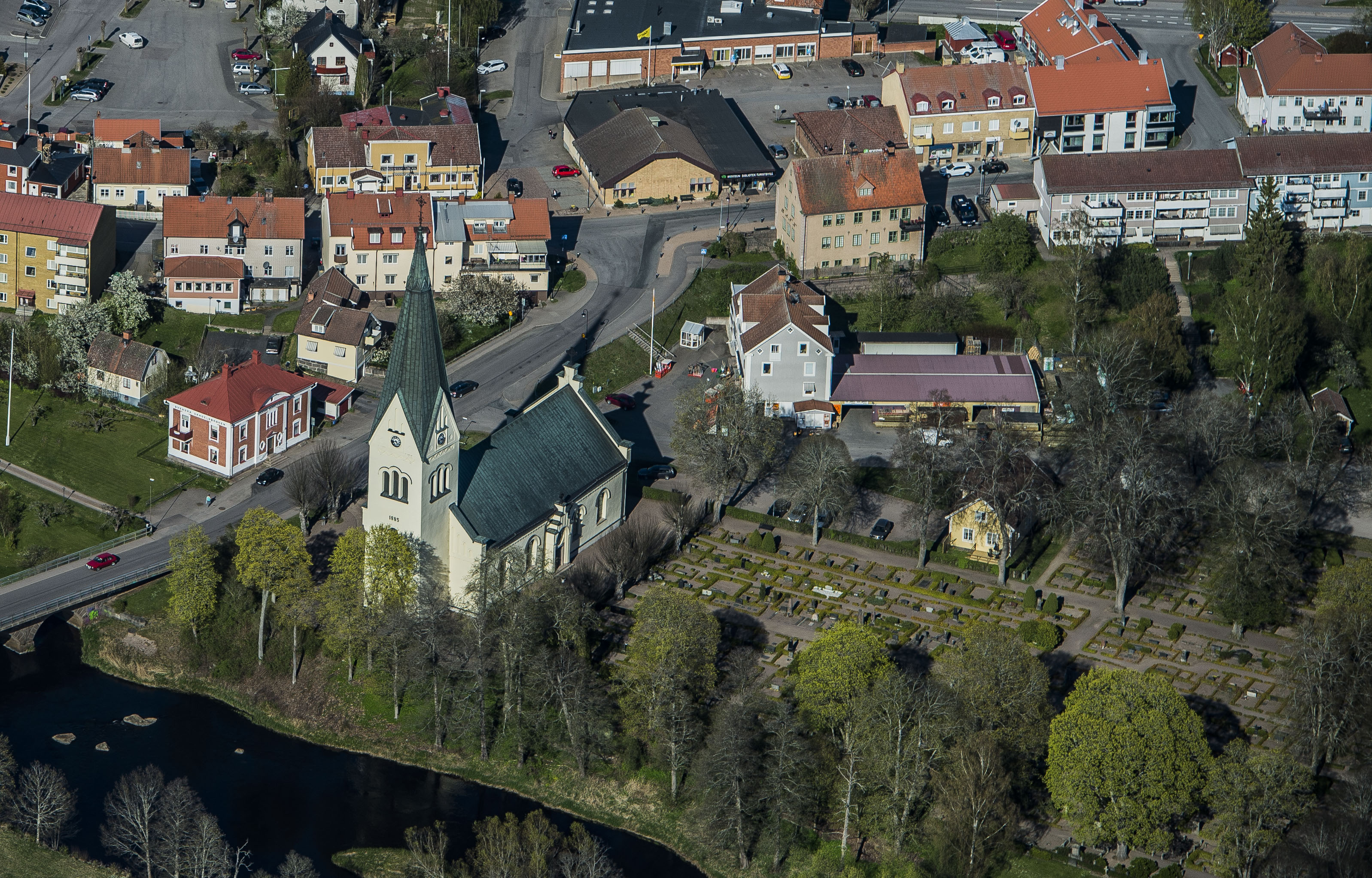

- Flag Coat of arms

- Coordinates: 57°10′N 16°02′E
- Country: Sweden
- County: Kalmar County
- Seat: Högsby

Area
  - Total: 799.42 km^{2} (308.66 sq mi)
  - Land: 751.11 km^{2} (290.01 sq mi)
  - Water: 48.31 km^{2} (18.65 sq mi)
- Area as of 1 January 2014.

Population (30 June 2025)
  - Total: 5,227
  - Density: 6.959/km^{2} (18.02/sq mi)
- Time zone: UTC+1 (CET)
  - Summer (DST): UTC+2 (CEST)
- ISO 3166 code: SE
- Province: Småland
- Municipal code: 0821
- Website: www.hogsby.se

Högsby Municipality (Swedish: Högsby kommun) is a municipality in Kalmar County, south-eastern Sweden. Its seat is located in the town Högsby.

The latest nationwide subdivision reform in Sweden was centred on the year 1971. In this area the amalgamation took place already in 1969 when Fagerhult joined Högsby.

The municipality has the smallest population of the municipalities of Kalmar County. The population increase has been insignificant - in 1908 the parish had some 5,000 inhabitants. The municipality itself was created with the Swedish municipal reform in 1971.

== History ==
Högsby Municipality has a history tracing back to the medieval age, around 1,200 BC. In the 15th and 16th century it was involved in conquests by the Danish soldiers, and Swedish king Gustav Vasa in his quest to find revolutionary Nils Dacke hideout and supporters in the Småland forests demolished Högsby.

In the municipality are also several old churches of interests with some old archifacts.

== Geography ==
In total, most of the municipality consists of forest and water areas; some of it has been made nature reserves hosting rare animals and plants.

Other sights are the streams and lakes that offer opportunities for fishing, bathing and canoeing, or just as nature experiences. It reflects itself in the coat of arms, showing water. The most notable streams are Emån and Alsterån; with Allgunnen being the largest lake.

=== Localities ===
There are four urban areas (also called a Tätort or locality) in Högsby Municipality.

In the table the localities are listed according to the size of the population as of December 31, 2023. The municipal seat is in bold characters.

#	Locality	Population
1	**Högsby**	1,872
2	Berga	655
3	Ruda	556
4	Fågelfors	368

== Demographics ==
This is a demographic table based on Högsby Municipality's electoral districts in the 2022 Swedish general election sourced from SVT's election platform, in turn taken from SCB official statistics.

In total there were 5,641 residents, including 3,988 Swedish citizens of voting age. 44.2 % voted for the left coalition and 54.4 % for the right coalition. Indicators are in percentage points except population totals and income.

Location	Residents	Citizen adults	Left vote	Right vote	Employed	Swedish parents	Foreign heritage	Income SEK	Degree
Location			%	%					
Berga	992	710	40.2	58.6	73	74	26	21,238	26
Fagerhult	611	457	37.7	60.1	77	79	21	21,319	25
Fågelfors	514	333	50.2	49.1	71	67	33	18,611	20
Högsby	2,201	1,599	51.5	47.1	74	72	28	21,705	24
Ruda	1,323	889	36.8	62.1	68	69	31	19,732	21
Source: SVT

== International relations ==
=== Twin towns — sister cities ===
The municipality is twinned with:

- Vörå, Finland
- Berga, Spain
