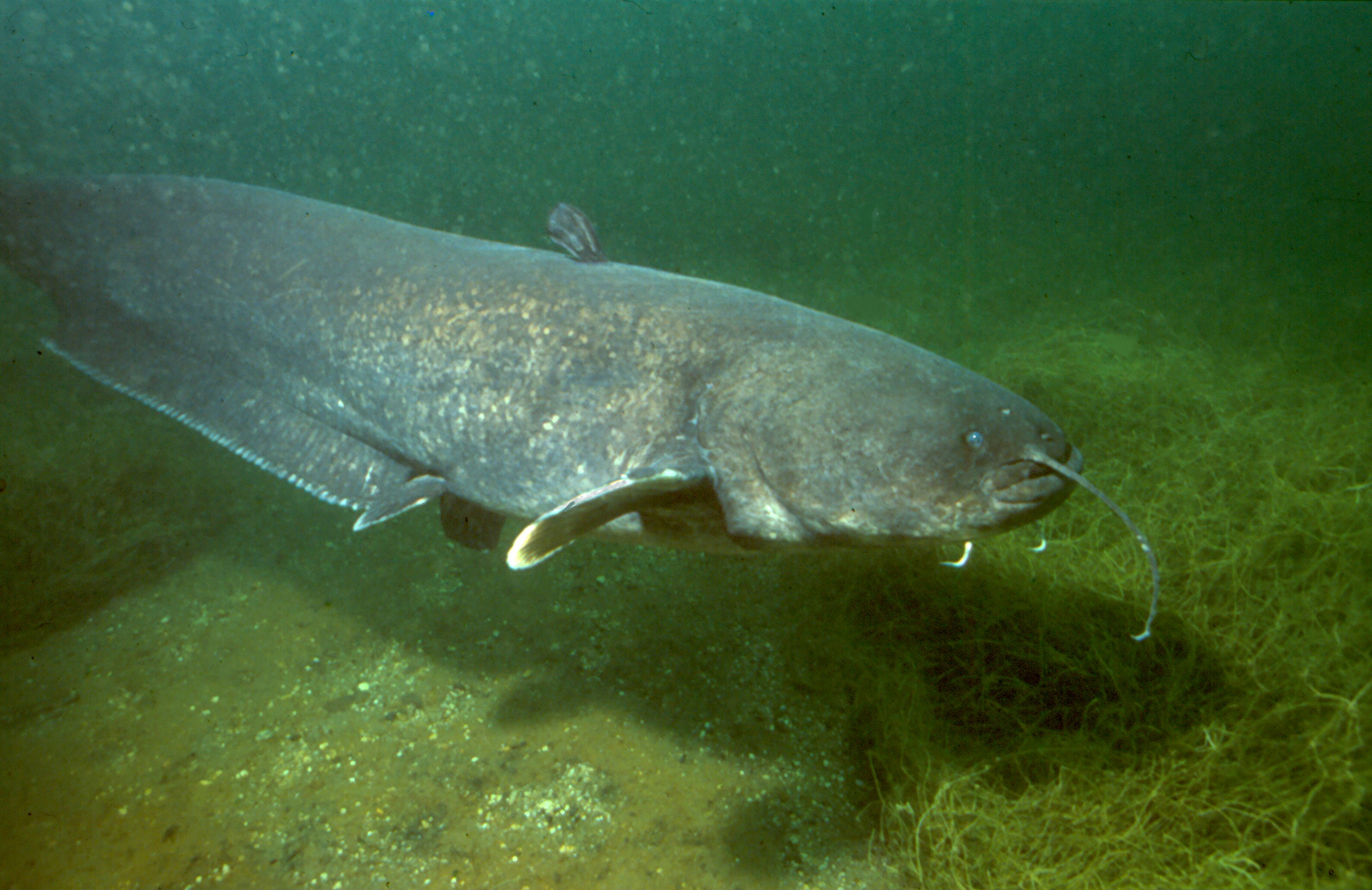
- Near Leipzig, Germany

Conservation status
- Least Concern (IUCN 3.1)

Scientific classification
- Kingdom: Animalia
- Phylum: Chordata
- Class: Actinopterygii
- Division: Teleostei
- Order: Siluriformes
- Family: Siluridae
- Genus: Silurus
- Species: S. glanis

Binomial name
- Silurus glanis Linnaeus, 1758
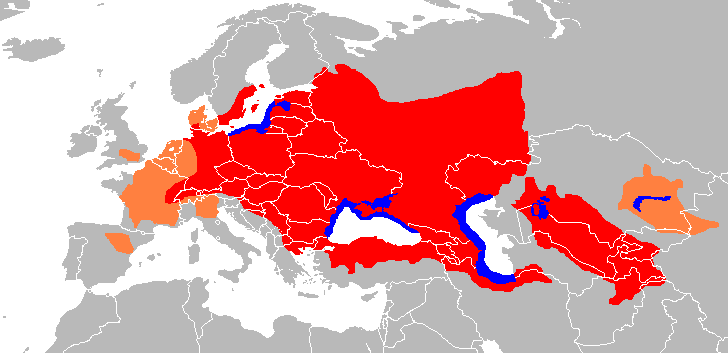
- Range of the wels catfish. Red: native occurrence. Blue: occurrence in coastal waters. Orange: (re)introduced

= Wels catfish =

Wels catfish Temporal range: Late Miocene to present

Species of fish

The wels catfish (/ˈwɛls/ or /ˈvɛls/; Silurus glanis), also called sheatfish or just wels, is a large species of catfish native to wide areas of central, southern, and eastern Europe, in the basins of the Baltic, Black and Caspian Seas. It has been introduced to several countries in Western Europe, Mediterranean and Asia as a prized sport fish. Its modern day range spans from the United Kingdom in the west to western China in the east.

== Etymology ==
The English common name comes from Wels, the common name of the species in German language. Wels is a variation of Old High German wal, from Proto-Germanic *hwalaz – the same source as for whale – from Proto-Indo-European *(s)kʷálos ('sheatfish').

== Evolution ==
The earliest identifiable fossil remains of the wels catfish are from the late Miocene (about 5.3 million years ago) of Ukraine. Potentially slightly older but less well-preserved remains from 6–7 million years ago are also known from the same region. During this time period, the dominant catfish in eastern Europe appears to have been the modern Soldatov's catfish (S. soldatovi), now only found in eastern Asia, which was better adapted to the warmer climate. The wels catfish may have been restricted to a single refugium in the Ponto-Caspian region around this point. During the Pliocene, the wels catfish appears to have expanded its range and gradually supplanted Soldatov's catfish, up to the latter's extirpation from the region during the late Pliocene. It is thought that the more adaptable wels catfish was more tolerant to the cooling and drying trend over this period, and the increased seasonality caused by it.

== Description ==
The wels catfish's mouth contains lines of numerous small teeth, two long barbels on the upper jaw and four shorter barbels on the lower jaw. It has a long anal fin that extends to the caudal fin, and a small sharp dorsal fin relatively far forward. The wels relies largely on hearing and smell for hunting prey (owing to its sensitive Weberian apparatus and chemoreceptors), although like many other catfish, the species exhibits a tapetum lucidum, providing its eyes with a degree of sensitivity at night, when the species is most active. With its sharp pectoral fins, it creates an eddy to disorient its victim, which the predator sucks into its mouth and swallows whole. The skin is very slimy. Skin colour varies with environment. Clear water will give the fish a black color, while muddy water will often tend to produce green-brown specimens. The underside is always pale yellow to white in colour. Albinistic specimens are known to exist and are caught occasionally. With an elongated body-shape, wels are able to swim backwards like eels.

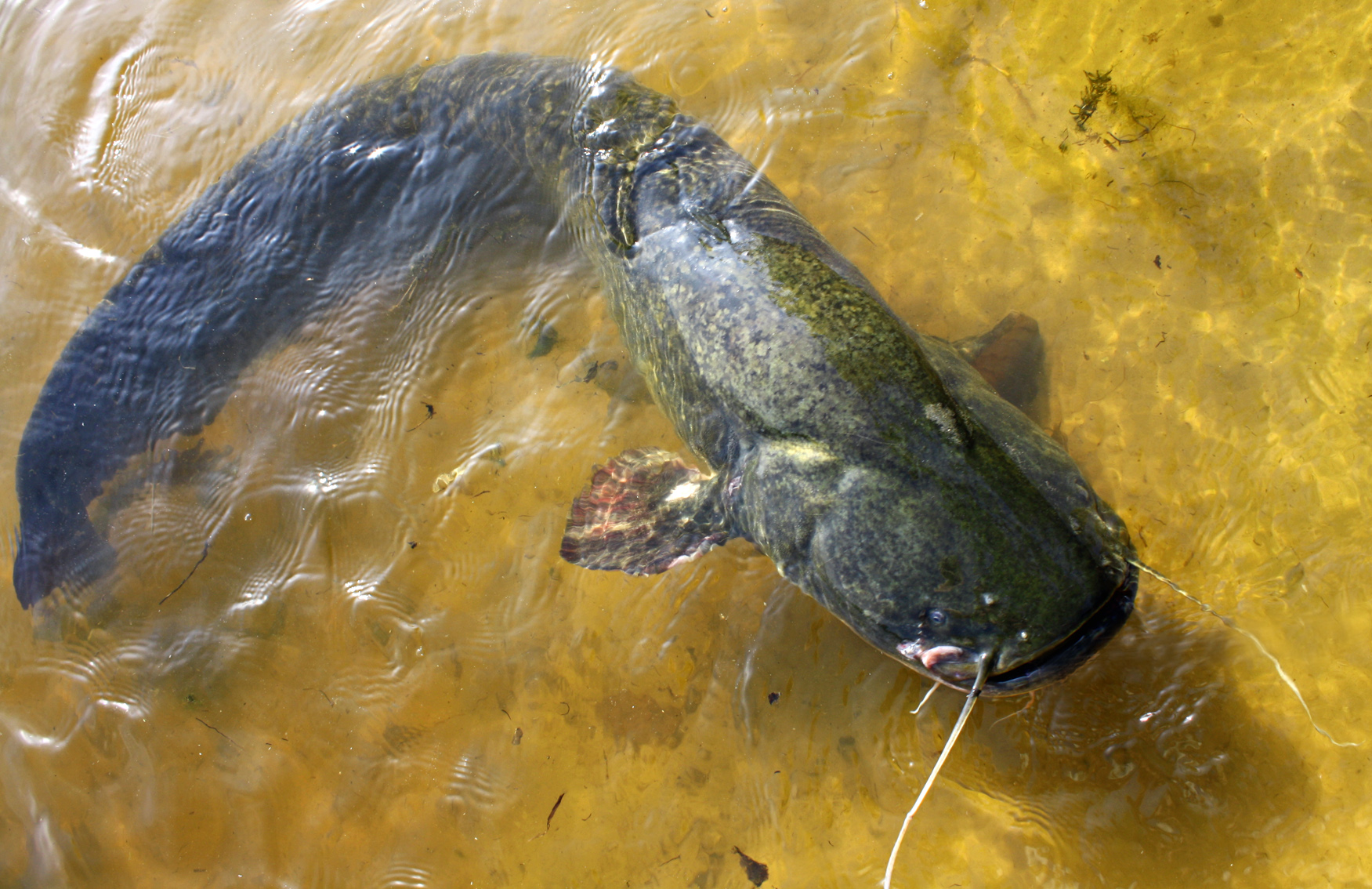
Wels catfish observed in the Dnieper River.

The female produces up to 30,000 eggs per kilogram of body weight. The male guards the nest until the brood hatches, which, depending on water temperature, can take from three to ten days. If the water level decreases too much or too fast the male has been observed to splash the eggs with its tail in order to keep them wet.

Life-expectancy within the species varies depending on regional climate; in warm areas optimal for growth and breeding e.g. in Central and Southern Europe, the average life-expectancy is 20 to 30 years. In colder waters, lower environmental temperatures slow the fish's metabolism but greatly extend its lifespan. A two-meter (6 ft 7 in) wels, captured during a recent study in Sweden, was estimated to be at least 70 years old, four times the age of similarly-sized fish in warmer habitats.

=== Size ===
The wels is one of the largest freshwater fish in Europe and Western Asia, only exceeded by the anadromous Atlantic and beluga sturgeon. Most adult wels catfish are about 1.3–1.6 m (4 ft 3 in – 5 ft 3 in) long; fish longer than 2 m (6 ft 7 in) are a rarity. At 1.5 m (4 ft 11 in) they can weigh 15–20 kg (33–44 lb) and at 2.2 m (7 ft 3 in) they can weigh 65 kg (143 lb).

Only under exceptionally good living circumstances can the wels catfish reach lengths of more than about 2 m (6 ft 7 in). Examples include the record wels catfish of Kiebingen (near Rottenburg, Germany), which was 2.49 m (8 ft 2 in) long and weighed 89 kg (196 lb). Even larger specimens have been caught in Poland (2.61 m 109 kg), the Czech Republic (2.64 m), the Dnieper River in Ukraine, the Volga River in Russia, the Ili River in Kazakhstan, France, Spain (in the Ebro), Italy (in the Po and Arno), Serbia (in Gruža Lake, where a 2.4 m (7 ft 10 in) long specimen weighing 117 kg (258 lb) was caught on 21 June 2018 and the Danube river, where a catfish measuring 2.75 m (9.0 ft) and weighing 117 kg (258 lb) was caught at Đerdap gorge in the same year), and Greece, where this fish was introduced a few decades ago. Greek wels grow well thanks to the mild climate, lack of competition, and good food supply.

The heaviest authenticated specimen, captured from the river Po by a Hungarian fisherman in 2010, weighed 134.97 kg (297.6 lb), although there are recent anecdotal reports of larger wels exceeding 140 kg (300 lb). Meanwhile, the longest wels on authentic record was an unweighed specimen from a Polish reservoir measuring 2.92 m (9.6 ft), captured in 2025.

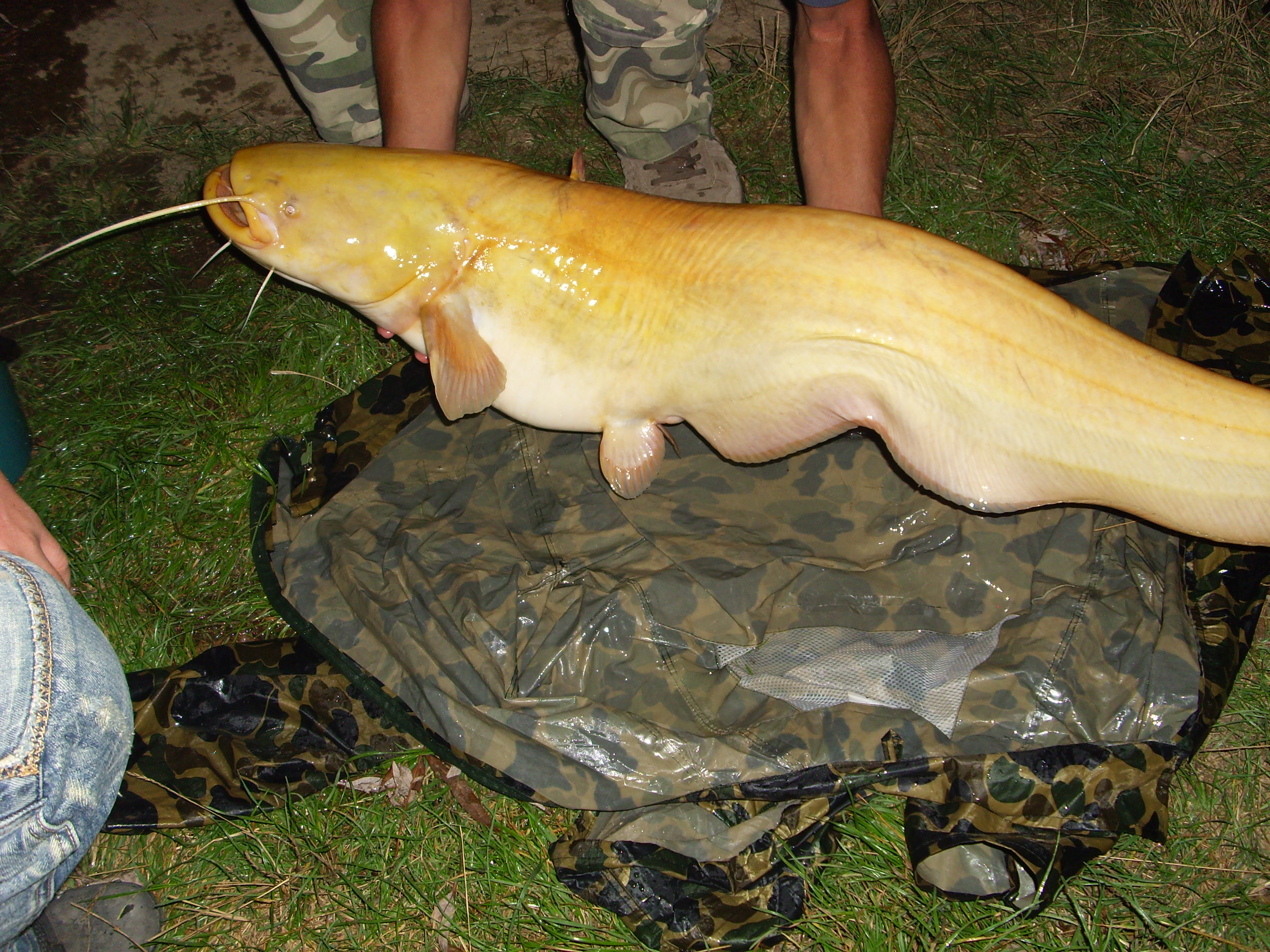
An albino Wels catfish.

The maximum total length may possibly exceed 3 m (9.8 ft) with a maximum weight of over 200 kg (440 lb). Such lengths are rare and unproven during the last century, but there is a somewhat credible report from the 19th century of a wels catfish of this size. Brehms Tierleben cites Heckl's and Kner's old reports from the Danube about specimens 3 m (9.8 ft) long and 200–250 kg (440–550 lb) in weight, and Vogt's 1894 report of a specimen caught in Lake Biel which was 2.2 m (7 ft 3 in) long and weighed 68 kg (150 lb). In 1856, K. T. Kessler wrote about specimens from the Dnieper River which were over 5 m (16 ft) long and weighed up to 400 kg (880 lb). (According to the Hungarian naturalist Ottó Hermann [1835-1914], catfish of 300–400 kilograms were also caught in Hungary in the old centuries from the Tisza river.)

Reports even exist from Sweden of exceptional, but unverified specimens in the 19th and early 20th centuries, prior to the species' widespread decline in the country. In 1891, zoologist Wilhelm Lilljeborg described the capture of a 127.5 kg (281 lb) wels in a fyke-net from lake Ivö. In 1921, a wels weighing approximately 140 kg (310 lb) was found dead at a hydroelectric dam on the Emån. In August 1870, a wels measuring 6 Swedish ells (corresponding to 3.56 metres (11 ft 8 in)), and elsewhere described as weighing 180 kg (400 lb), was reportedly captured from Lake Båven, near Eskilstuna by angler Anders Petter Karlsson. The specimen was thereafter purchased, and its skin and skeleton were donated to the local school museum. In modern Sweden, the official rod-caught record for the species is a 60.1 kg (132 lb) fish caught from the Emån in 1981.

Exceptionally large specimens are rumored to attack humans in rare instances. This claim was investigated by extreme angler Jeremy Wade in an episode of the Animal Planet television series River Monsters following his capture of three fish, two of about 66 kg (145 lb) and one of 74 kg (164 lb), of which two attempted to attack him following their release. A report in the Austrian newspaper Der Standard on 5 August 2009, mentions a wels catfish dragging a fisherman near Győr, Hungary, under water by his right leg after he attempted to grab the fish in a hold. The man reported he barely escaped from the fish, which he estimated to have weighed over 100 kg (220 lb).

=== Diet ===
Silurus lunging out of water to capture pigeons

Like most freshwater bottom feeders, the wels catfish lives on annelid worms, gastropods, insects, crustaceans and fish. Larger specimens have also been observed to eat crayfish, eels, frogs, snakes, rats, voles, coypu and aquatic birds such as ducks, even cannibalising on other catfish. Researchers at the University of Toulouse, France, in 2012 documented individuals of this species in an introduced environment lunging out of the water to feed on pigeons at water edge. 28% of the beaching behaviour observed and filmed in this study were successful in bird capture. Stable isotope analyses of catfish stomach contents using carbon-13 and nitrogen-15 revealed a highly variable dietary composition of terrestrial birds. This is likely the result of adapting their behaviour to forage on novel prey in response to new environments upon its introduction to the river Tarn in 1983 since this type of behaviour has not been reported within the native range of this species. They can also eat red worms in the fall, but only the river species.

The wels catfish has also been observed taking advantage of large die-offs of Asian clams to feed on the dead clams at the surface of the water during the daytime. This opportunistic feeding highlights the adaptability of the wels catfish to new food sources, since the species is mainly a nocturnal bottom-feeder.

== Distribution and ecology ==
The wels catfish lives in large, warm lakes and deep, slow-flowing rivers. It prefers to remain in sheltered locations such as holes in the riverbed, sunken trees, etc. It consumes its food in the open water or in the deep, where it can be recognized by its large mouth. Wels catfish are kept in fish ponds as food fish.

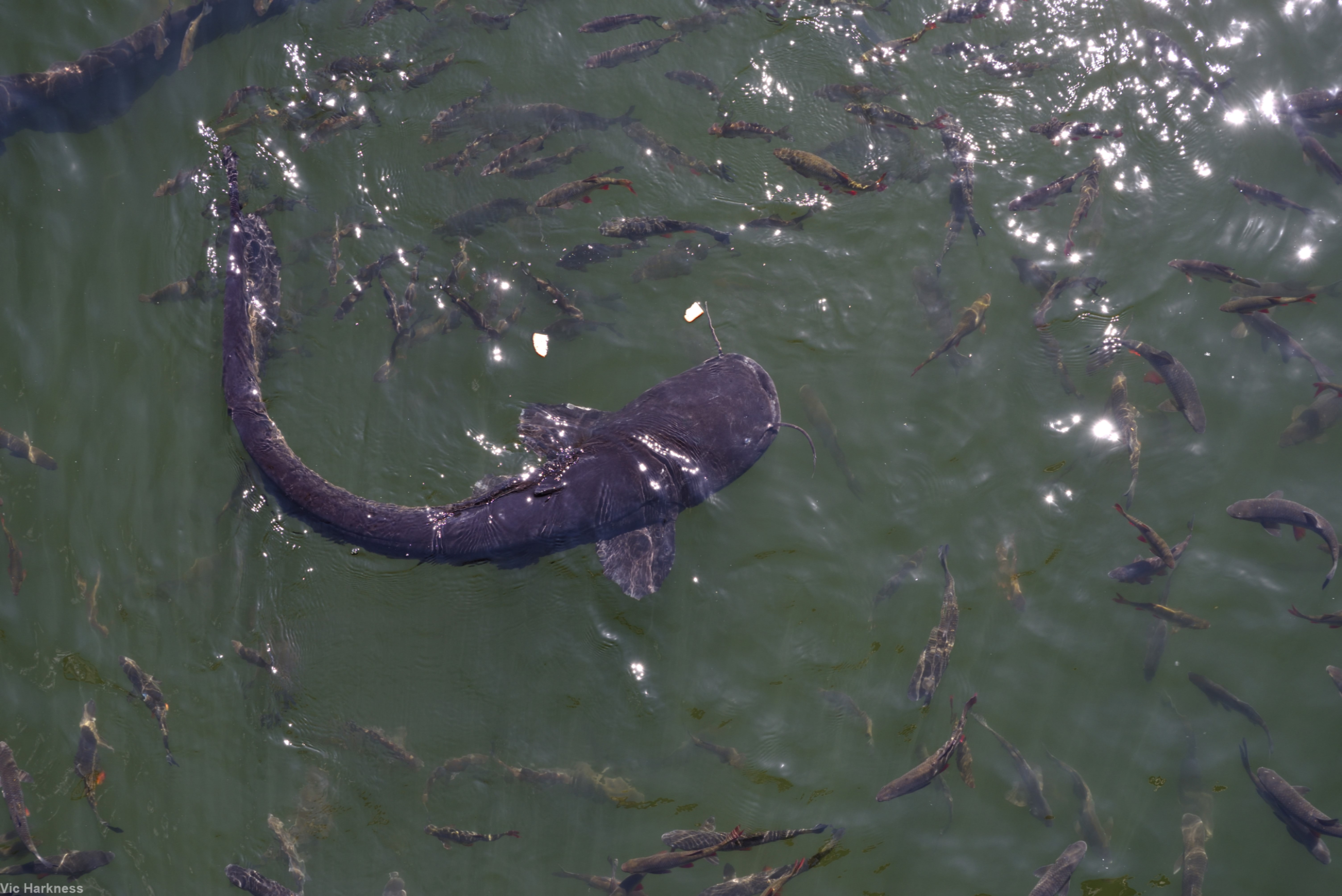
Wels catfish in Chernobyl are fed bread by tourists

An unusual habitat for the species exists inside the Chernobyl exclusion zone, where a small population lives in abandoned cooling ponds and channels at a close distance to the decommissioned power plant. These catfish appear healthy, and are maintaining a position as top predators in the aquatic ecosystem of the immediate area.

=== As introduced species ===
There are concerns about the ecological impact of introducing the wels catfish to regions where it is not native. Following the introduction of wels catfish, populations of other fish species have undergone steep declines. Since its introduction in the Mequinenza Reservoir in 1974, it has spread to other parts of the Ebro basin, including its tributaries, especially the Segre River. Some endemic species of Iberian barbels, genus Barbus in the Cyprinidae that were once abundant, especially in the Ebro river, have disappeared due to competition with and predation by wels catfish. The ecology of the river has also changed, with a major growth in aquatic vegetation such as algae.

The wels catfish may have established a population in Santa Catarina, Brazil. They were imported from Hungary in 1988 and were washed into the Itajaí-Açu river after a flood caused their tanks to overflow. In 2006, a specimen weighing 86 kg (190 lb) and measuring 1.85 m (6 ft 1 in) was captured in Blumenau, suggesting the catfish have survived and are possibly reproducing.

=== Conservation status ===
Although Silurus glanis is not considered globally endangered, the conservation status varies across the species native distribution range. In the northern periphery of the distribution, the species has been declining over the last centuries and was extinct from Denmark in the 1700s and from Finland in the 1800s. In Sweden it persists only in a few lakes and rivers, and is now considered as near threatened. Recent genetic studies have furthermore found that the Swedish populations harbors low genetic diversity and are genetically isolated and differentiated from each other, highlighting the need for conservation attention.

== As food ==
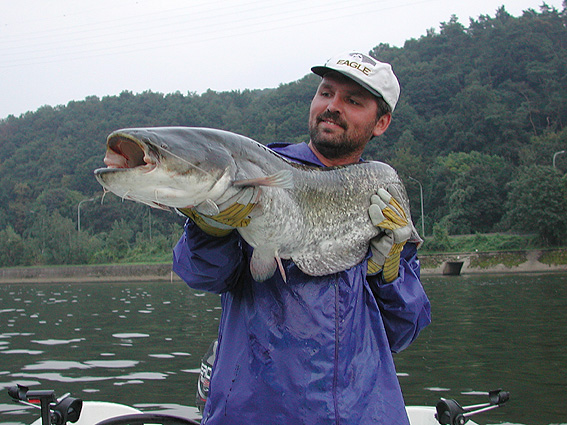
A fisherman posing with a Wels catfish.

Only when younger is the wels generally valued as food. The flesh is more palatable when the fish weighs less than 15 kg (33 lb). Larger than this size, the fish is highly fatty and additionally can be loaded with toxic contaminants through bioaccumulation due to its position at the top of the food chain. Large specimens are not recommended for consumption, but are sought out as sport fish due to their combativeness. A common lure for Wels catfish is a clonk, which when dropped in the water produces a distinct sound that induces them to bite.

== Attacks on people ==
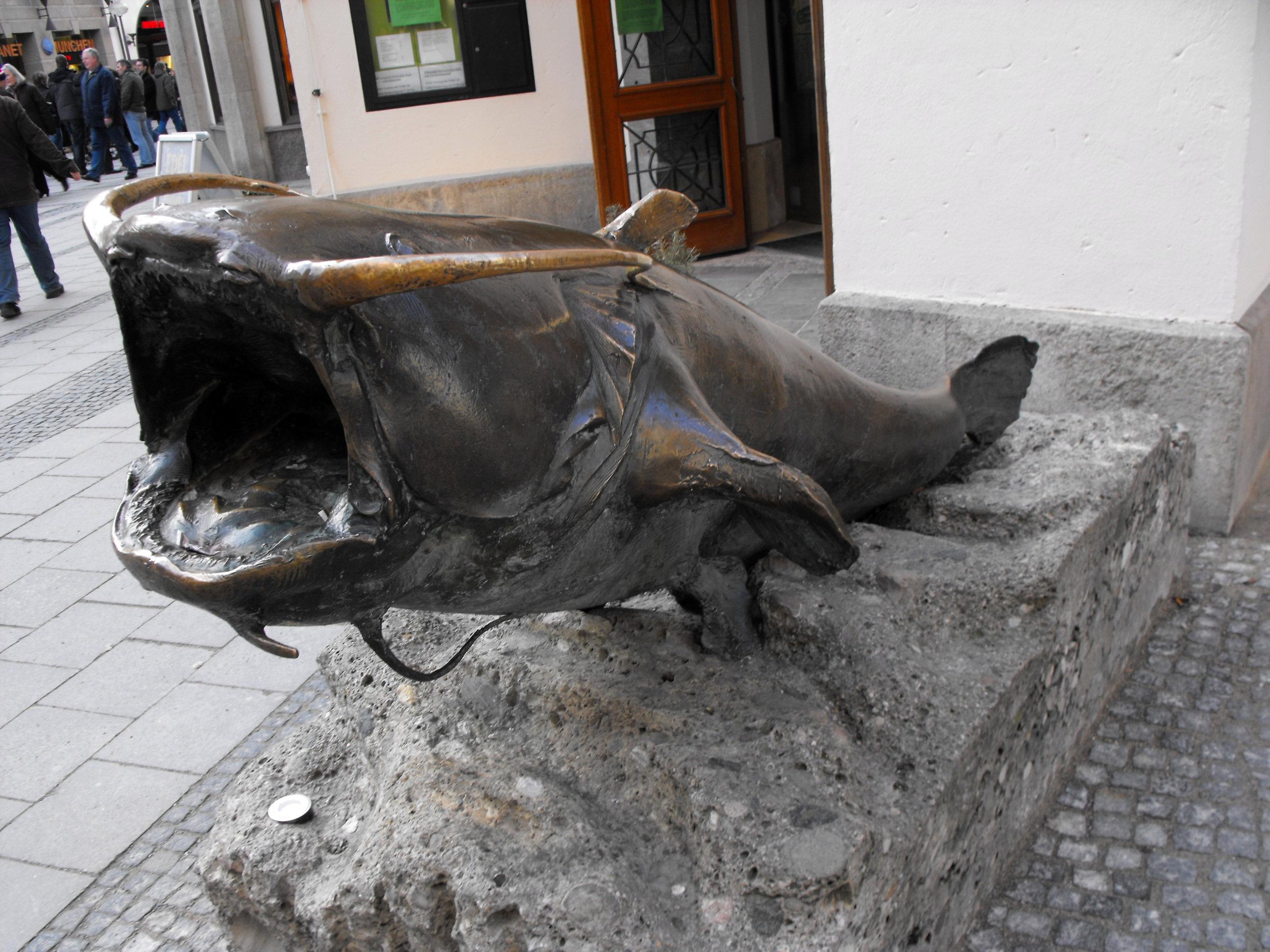
A bronze statue of a catfish, located in front of the entrance to the German Hunting and Fishing Museum (Deutsches Jagd- und Fischereimuseum) in Munich.

Tabloids regularly report attacks caused by various catfish that primarily affected animals (often only the role of the catfish was presumed). In April 2009, an Austrian fisherman was allegedly attacked by a catfish in one of the fishing lakes in Pér, near Győr, Hungary. However, the man reportedly managed to break free.

The wels was the subject of an episode in the first series of the documentary television show River Monsters. Host Jeremy Wade concluded that wels catfish in the area were not large enough to consume adult human beings, but could easily swallow a child. Wade documented instances of Wels catfish being aggressive towards humans, including a Wels he had just caught that "double[d] round" and attempted to bite his calf.

Similar stories occur in the works of older natural history writers. Alfred Brehm (1829–1884), a German naturalist, published his famous work The World of Animals in the 19th century. It was also translated into Hungarian at the beginning of the 20th century. In this, Brehm or the compiling Hungarian scientists write the following:

"Old Gesner's (Conrad Gessner Swiss naturalist, 1516–1565) claim that catfish doesn't spare humans either doesn't just belong in the realm of tales, as we know of several cases that confirm that. Thus, Heckel and Kner mention that a catfish was caught at Bratislava, in the stomach of which the remains of a child corpse were found. [...] Fishermen credible to Antipa (probably Romanian zoologist Grigore Antipa, 1866–1949) told me that children bathing in the stomachs of catfish were caught in the bones of their hands and feet. - Communicates Vutskits (probably Hungarian zoologist hu:Vutskits György, 1858–1929). - A Romanian fisherman penetrated the middle of the Danube with his boat because he wanted to take a bath. While bathing, a catfish caught his legs, which he could no longer pull out of the mouth of this big-mouthed monster, and so he got to the bottom of the water. A few days later, they came across the corpse of a dead fisherman whose legs were still in the catfish's mouth, but even the greedy robber could not release his victim's legs and drowned because of it".

In June 2025, a wels was shot at by a police officer after it had bitten five people in the Brombachsee in northern Bavaria. The incident attracted media attention and sparked outrage on social media. According to the police, trying to kill the fish was necessary as it posed a threat to swimmers in the lake and to the guests of the Burning Beach electronic music festival nearby. The injured fish was retrieved by fishermen and killed. Following the incident, the animal rights group PETA announced plans to file charges against the local fishing association and police department on claims that the killing was in breach of nature conservation laws.

== Related species ==
- Aristotle's catfish (Silurus aristotelis) from Greece, the only other native European catfish species beside Silurus glanis.
- Amur catfish (Silurus asotus), native to East Asia and introduced to European rivers
- Giant Lake Biwa catfish (Silurus biwaensis) from Japan endemic to Lake Biwa.
- Soldatov's catfish (Silurus soldatovi) from the Amur River, Russia

== See also ==
- Wallago attu
