= Landsbro =

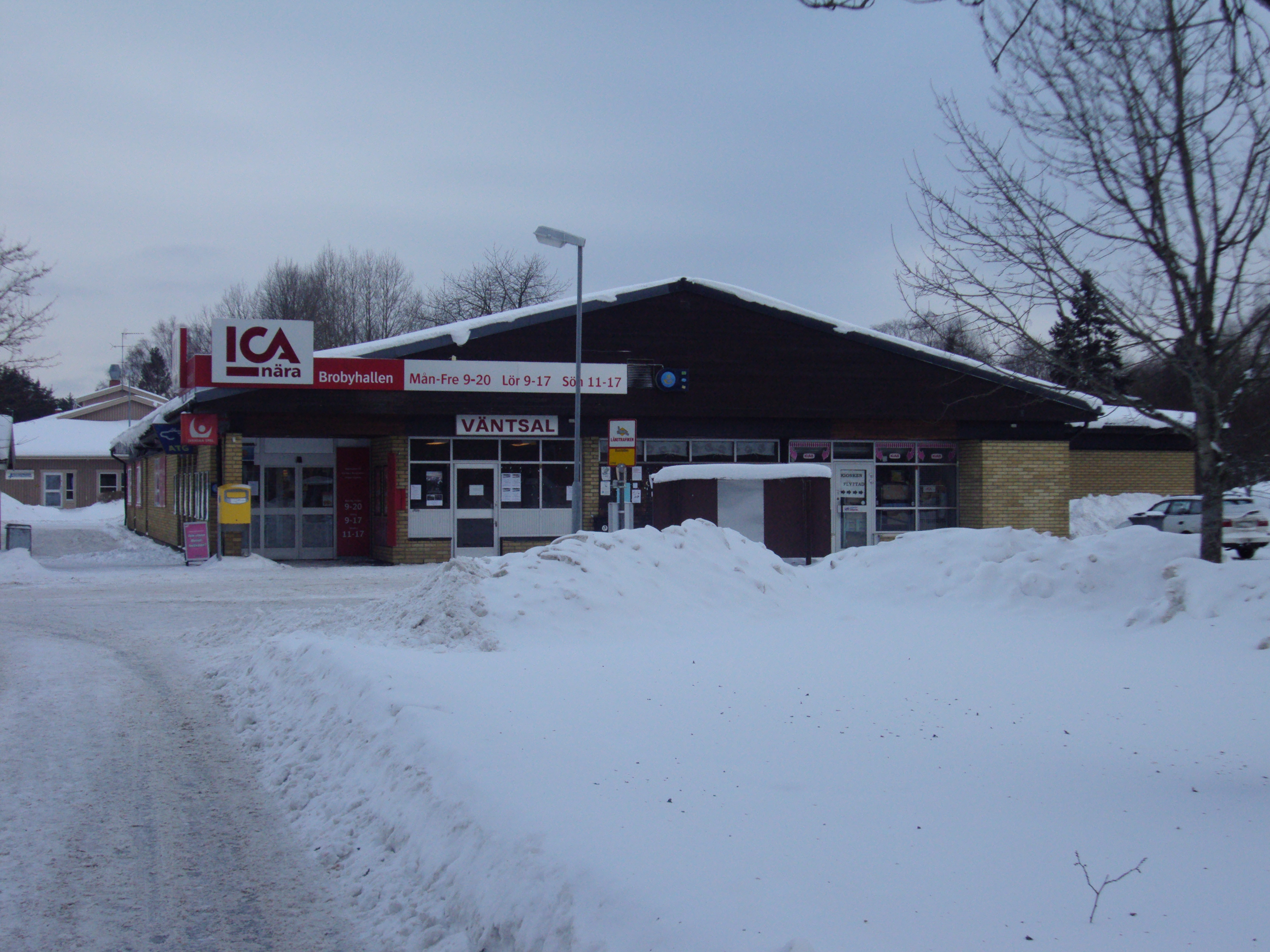
- Central Landsbro in mid-February 2010

- Location within Jönköping Location within Sweden
- Coordinates: 57°22′N 14°54′E
- Country: Sweden
- Province: Småland
- County: Jönköping County
- Municipality: Vetlanda Municipality

Area
  - Total: 1.85 km^{2} (0.71 sq mi)

Population (31 December 2010)
  - Total: 1,426
  - Density: 769/km^{2} (1,990/sq mi)
- Time zone: UTC+1 (CET)
  - Summer (DST): UTC+2 (CEST)
- Climate: Cfb

Landsbro (Swedish pronunciation: [landsˈbruː]) is a locality situated in Vetlanda Municipality, Jönköping County, Sweden with 1,426 inhabitants in 2010.

== Notable people ==
- Johan Franzén, professional ice hockey player
- Erik Karlsson, professional ice hockey player for the Pittsburgh Penguins
- Linus Karlsson, professional ice hockey player for the Vancouver Canucks
