= Nye, Sweden =

Nye
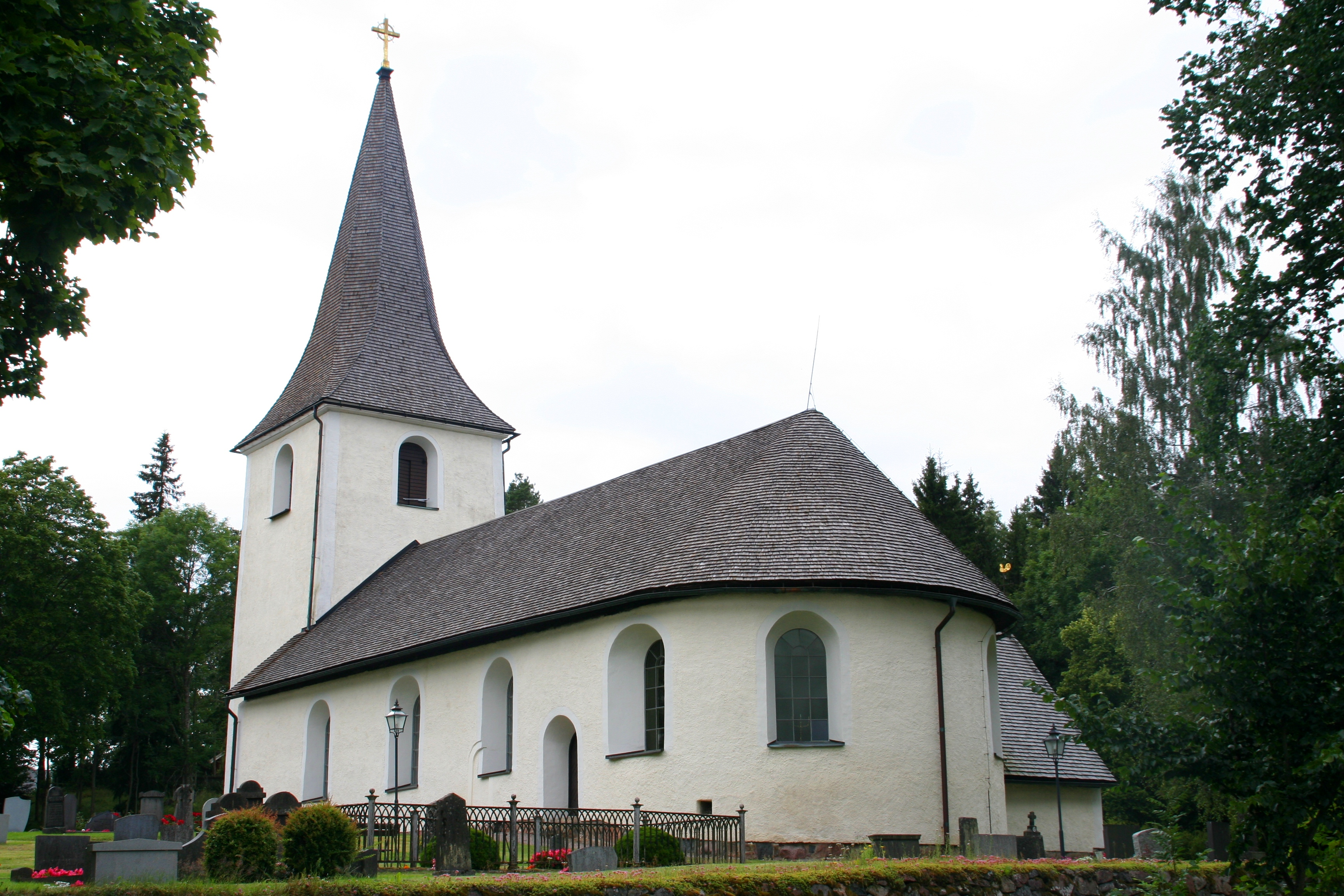
- Nye church

- Location within Jönköping Location within Sweden
- Coordinates: 57°21′N 15°15′E
- Country: Sweden
- Province: Småland
- County: Jönköping County
- Municipality: Vetlanda Municipality

Area
  - Total: 0.45 km^{2} (0.17 sq mi)

Population (2005-12-31)
  - Total: 203
  - Density: 447/km^{2} (1,160/sq mi)
- Time zone: UTC+1 (CET)
  - Summer (DST): UTC+2 (CEST)

Nye is a village situated in Vetlanda Municipality, Jönköping County, Sweden with 203 inhabitants in 2005.
