= Ekenässjön =

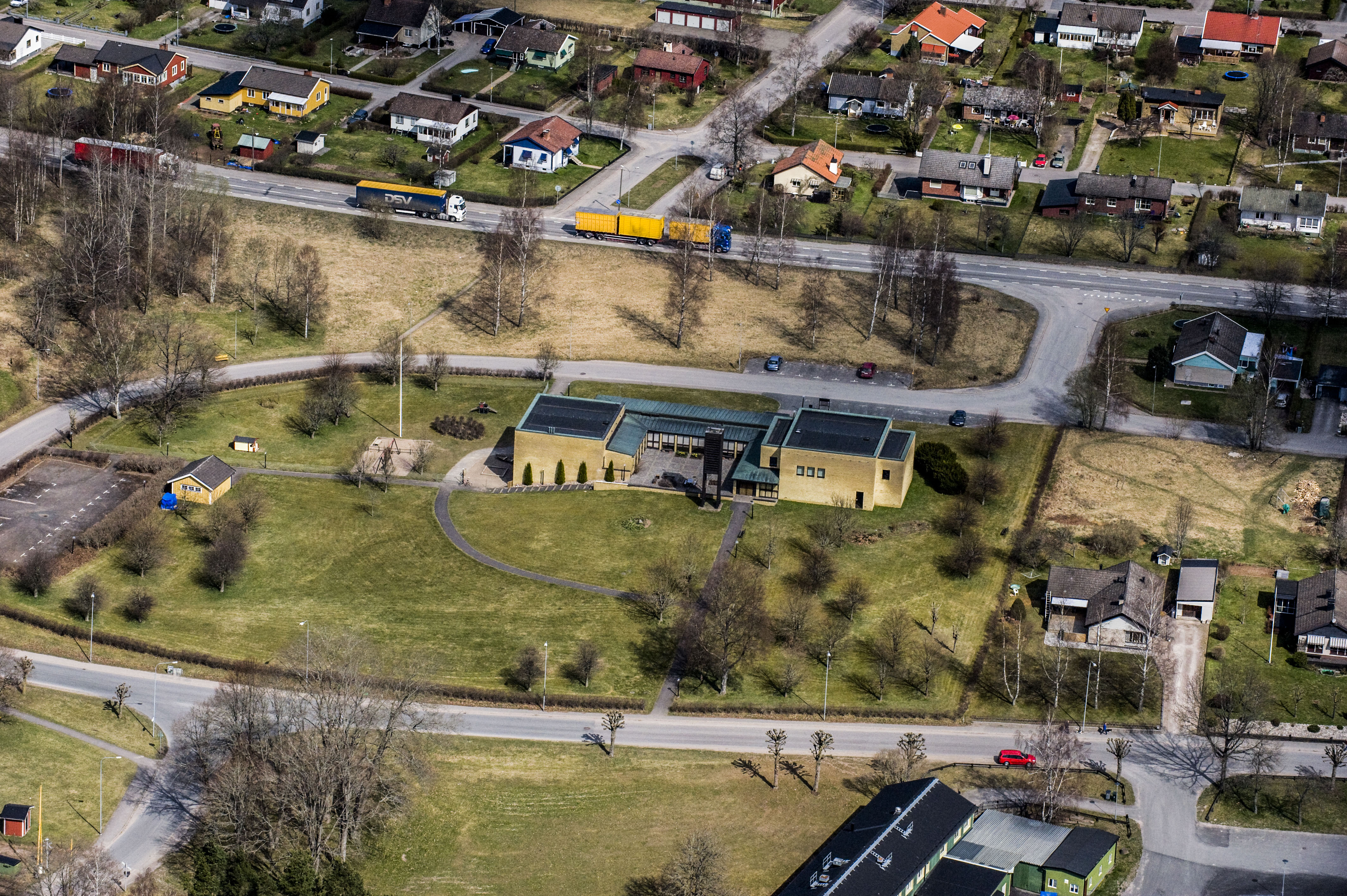

- Location within Jönköping Location within Sweden
- Coordinates: 57°30′N 15°00′E
- Country: Sweden
- Province: Småland
- County: Jönköping County
- Municipality: Vetlanda Municipality

Area
  - Total: 2.22 km^{2} (0.86 sq mi)

Population (31 December 2010)
  - Total: 1,517
  - Density: 683/km^{2} (1,770/sq mi)
- Time zone: UTC+1 (CET)
  - Summer (DST): UTC+2 (CEST)
- Climate: Dfb

Ekenässjön is a locality situated in Vetlanda Municipality, Jönköping County, Sweden with 1,517 inhabitants in 2010.
