= Vetlanda Municipality =

Vetlanda Municipality Vetlanda kommun
- Municipality
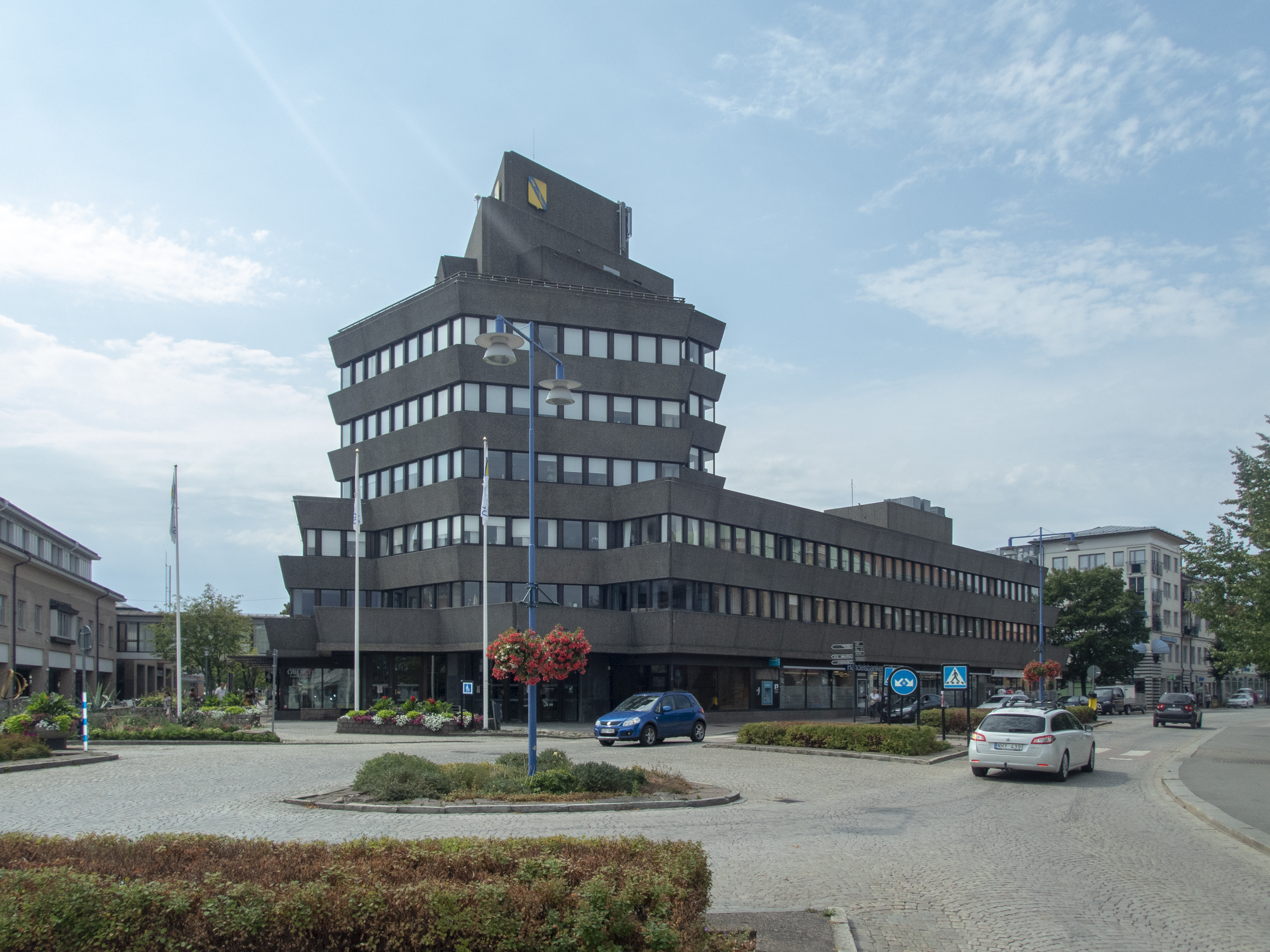
- Vetlanda City Hall

- Coat of arms

- Coordinates: 57°26′N 15°04′E
- Country: Sweden
- County: Jönköping County
- Seat: Vetlanda

Area
  - Total: 1,600.43 km^{2} (617.93 sq mi)
  - Land: 1,500.51 km^{2} (579.35 sq mi)
  - Water: 99.92 km^{2} (38.58 sq mi)
- Area as of 1 January 2014.

Population (30 June 2025)
  - Total: 27,462
  - Density: 18.302/km^{2} (47.401/sq mi)
- Time zone: UTC+1 (CET)
  - Summer (DST): UTC+2 (CEST)
- ISO 3166 code: SE
- Province: Småland
- Municipal code: 0685
- Website: www.vetlanda.se

Vetlanda Municipality (Swedish: Vetlanda kommun) is a municipality in Jönköping County, southern Sweden. The town of Vetlanda is the municipality's seat.

The municipality was created in 1971 when the City of Vetlanda (instituted in 1920) was amalgamated with the surrounding rural municipalities to form a unitary municipality. When Sweden's first local government laws went into effect in 1863, there were more than 20 entities located within the current municipality's boundaries.

Vetlanda is the birthplace of Johan Franzén, a professional ice hockey center who played for the Detroit Red Wings of the National Hockey League.

== Geography ==
Vetlanda Municipality is the largest municipality in Jönköping County. The municipality is situated on the South Swedish highlands, an area situated some 250 meters above sea level and also includes Eksjö Municipality and Nässjö Municipality. It is a place with many tourist attractions, as well as various historical sites and other destinations to visit.

The distance to any of the three largest Swedish cities Malmö (south-west), Gothenburg (west) and Stockholm (north-east) is rather similar; about 300 km.

=== Localities ===
There are 12 urban areas (also called a Tätort or locality) in Vetlanda Municipality.

In the table, the localities are listed according to the size of the population as of December 31, 2005. The municipal seat is in bold characters.

#	Locality	Population
1	**Vetlanda**	12,691
2	Ekenässjön	1,551
3	Landsbro	1,454
4	Holsbybrunn	780
5	Korsberga	731
6	Myresjö	644
7	Kvillsfors	560
8	Sjunnen	417
9	Skede	345
10	Björköby	312
11	Pauliström	257
12	Nye	203

== Demographics ==
This is a demographic table based on Vetlanda Municipality's electoral districts in the 2022 Swedish general election sourced from SVT's election platform, in turn taken from SCB official statistics.

In total, there were 27,601 residents, including 20,663 Swedish citizens of voting age. 40.5% voted for the left coalition and 58.1% for the right coalition. Indicators are in percentage points except population totals and income.

Location	Residents	Citizen adults	Left vote	Right vote	Employed	Swedish parents	Foreign heritage	Income SEK	Degree
Location			%	%					
Alseda-Skede	2,463	1,808	39.6	58.6	81	85	15	24,455	28
Björkö-Nävelsjö	2,143	1,538	37.6	61.5	85	86	14	25,689	30
Brunnsgård	1,853	1,549	41.6	57.6	83	81	19	26,382	37
Bäckseda	2,515	1,907	37.5	61.5	91	88	12	30,132	37
Ekenässjön	1,766	1,259	42.6	56.1	81	73	27	24,008	25
Karlslund	1,657	1,310	41.7	57.6	86	82	18	26,476	31
Korsberga-Ramkvilla	2,076	1,526	38.5	60.4	86	88	12	24,331	34
Lannaskede-Fröderyd	1,930	1,389	38.6	60.2	81	79	21	22,885	27
Mellangården	2,333	1,815	43.7	55.1	80	74	26	23,787	33
Nye-Skirö-Näshult	1,260	944	34.6	63.1	87	89	11	25,641	36
Pukaregården	1,735	1,426	41.8	56.4	83	75	25	23,947	28
Tomaslunden	2,509	1,822	44.3	54.2	81	77	23	26,958	30
Vetlanda Flugeby	2,281	1,581	43.0	55.6	73	58	42	22,343	28
Ökna-Karlstorp	1,080	789	37.2	61.7	69	76	24	19,618	21
Source: SVT

== History ==
The history of Vetlanda goes back to at least the medieval age, when it was the seat for the regional assembly called þing (thing). According to the imagination of Petter Rudebeck (1660–1710), Vetlanda was before that known as Vitala, and the centre of a mythological kingdom. However, all later archeological research has failed in finding any evidence of it. But the myth was popular during the 18th and 19th centuries, which displays in the naming of several companies and locations around the municipality.

== Sports ==
Vetlanda boasts successful clubs in bandy (Vetlanda BK) and in motorcycle speedway (Vetlanda Speedway).
