= Korsberga, Vetlanda =

Korsberga
- Location within Jönköping Location within Sweden
- Coordinates: 57°18′N 15°08′E
- Country: Sweden
- Province: Småland
- County: Jönköping County
- Municipality: Vetlanda Municipality

Area
  - Total: 1.19 km^{2} (0.46 sq mi)

Population (31 December 2010)
  - Total: 694
  - Density: 584/km^{2} (1,510/sq mi)
- Time zone: UTC+1 (CET)
  - Summer (DST): UTC+2 (CEST)
- Climate: Cfb

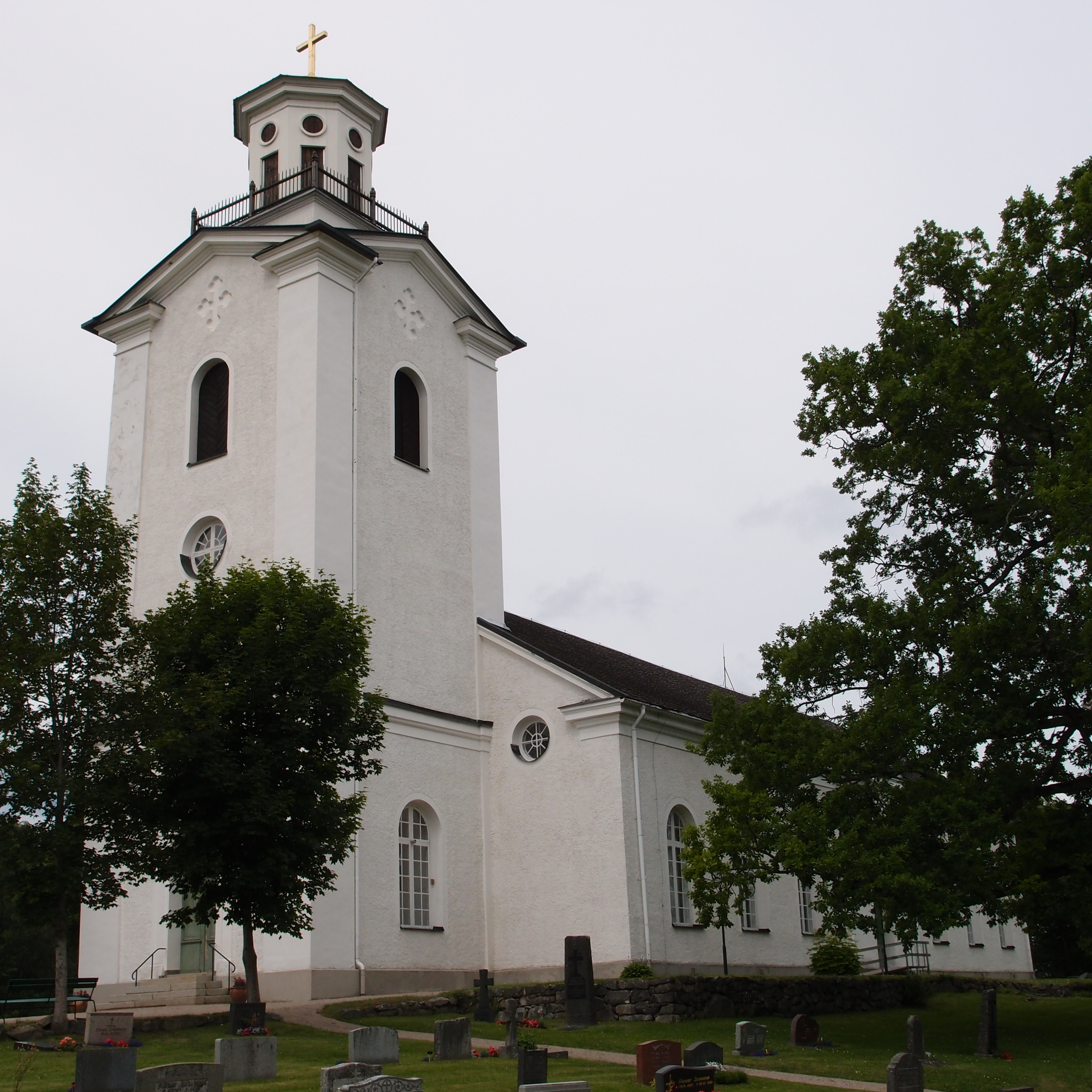

Korsberga is a locality situated in Vetlanda Municipality, Jönköping County, Sweden with 694 inhabitants in 2010.
