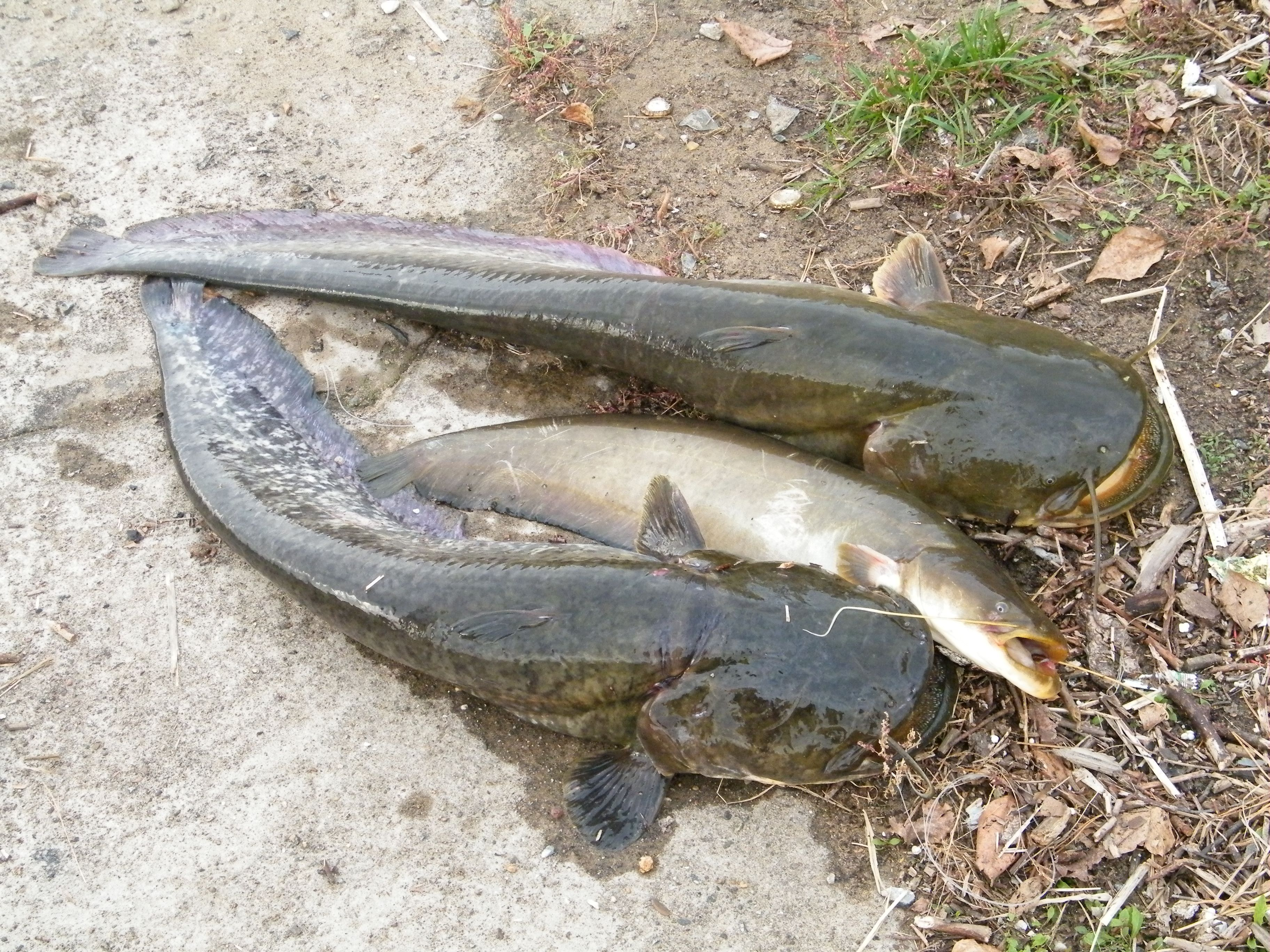

Scientific classification
- Kingdom: Animalia
- Phylum: Chordata
- Class: Actinopterygii
- Order: Siluriformes
- Family: Siluridae
- Genus: Silurus
- Species: S. soldatovi

Binomial name
- Silurus soldatovi Nikolskii & Soin, 1948

= Silurus soldatovi =

Soldatov's catfish Temporal range: Late Miocene to present

Species of fish

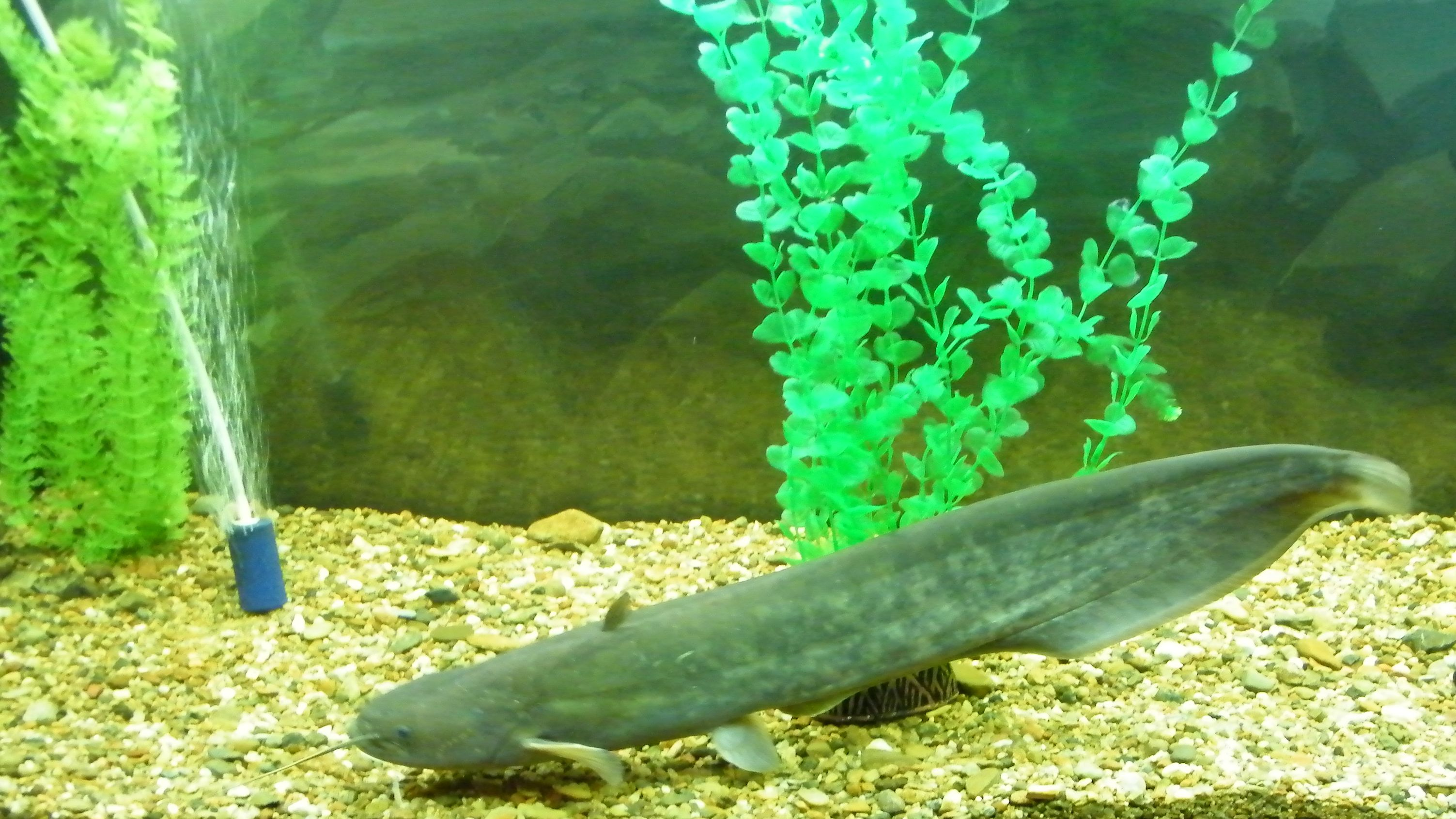
Silurus soldatovi

Silurus soldatovi, Soldatov's catfish or northern sheatfish, is a large catfish species from the Far East.

== Evolution ==
The earliest fossil remains of S. soldatovi are from the Late Miocene of Ukraine. These remains suggest that this species had a much wider range in the past, reaching as far west as eastern Europe, although it does not appear to have expanded any further west. Although it initially coexisted with the extinct airbreathing catfish Heterobranchus austriacus, it appears to have become the dominant catfish in the region during late Miocene and early Pliocene, potentially as a result of the Miocene climatic optimum. Afterwards, it appears to have been gradually replaced over the region by the wels catfish (S. glanis), potentially due to the latter species having a wider temperature tolerance and being better adapted for the cooling trend over the Pliocene. S. soldatovi was finally extirpated from Europe by the late Pliocene.

== Description ==
This catfish is visually similar to the closely related Wels catfish. Soldatov's catfish has a large flat head. Its mouth is blunt and rounded, the upper jaw shorter than the lower jaw. Barbels are located on the upper jaw and chin. It has the following formula fins: dorsal six soft rays, anal 83–90 soft rays. The fish can live up to 20 years, and can grow to about 4 meters in length and weigh 40 kilograms.

== Etymology ==
The fish is named in memory of Vladimir Soldatov (1875–1941), the preeminent authority on the Amurian fishes.

== Distribution and habitat ==
Soldatov's catfish lives in Amur River (Ussuri) in Russia and China. It prefers water temperatures from 5 to 25 °C. As suggested by fossil remains, it reached as far west as modern Ukraine during the warmer Late Miocene.

== Threats ==
The Soldatov's catfish population is threatened by overfishing, habitat degradation and water pollution. Due to its localized distribution and the low population density, the population is now considered endangered.
