= Fågelfors =

- Location within Kalmar Location within Sweden
- Coordinates: 57°12′N 15°50′E
- Country: Sweden
- Province: Småland
- County: Kalmar County
- Municipality: Högsby Municipality

Area
  - Total: 1.17 km^{2} (0.45 sq mi)

Population (31 December 2010)
  - Total: 424
  - Density: 361/km^{2} (930/sq mi)
- Time zone: UTC+1 (CET)
  - Summer (DST): UTC+2 (CEST)

Fågelfors is a locality situated in Högsby Municipality, Kalmar County, Sweden with 424 inhabitants in 2010.
