= Clonk (fishing) =

Fishing tool used to provoke Wels catfish to attack the lure

A clonk is a fishing tool which has been used in Europe to fish for Wels catfish. It consists of a stick with three parts: handle, fork and heel. Originally they were made of wood, but eventually cheaper clonks made of plastic and metal were developed.

When the clonk strikes the water, an air bubble is produced, which is then cut by the fork, producing a unique sound similar to the opening of a wine bottle. This sound stimulates the defensive instinct of nearby catfish, prompting them to attack the bait.
