= Sjunnen =

- Location within Jönköping Location within Sweden
- Coordinates: 57°26′N 15°10′E
- Country: Sweden
- Province: Småland
- County: Jönköping County
- Municipality: Vetlanda Municipality

Area
  - Total: 0.47 km^{2} (0.18 sq mi)

Population (31 December 2010)
  - Total: 422
  - Density: 903/km^{2} (2,340/sq mi)
- Time zone: UTC+1 (CET)
  - Summer (DST): UTC+2 (CEST)
- Climate: Cfb

Sjunnen is a locality situated in Vetlanda Municipality, Jönköping County, Sweden with 422 inhabitants in 2010.
