= Berga, Högsby Municipality =

Berga
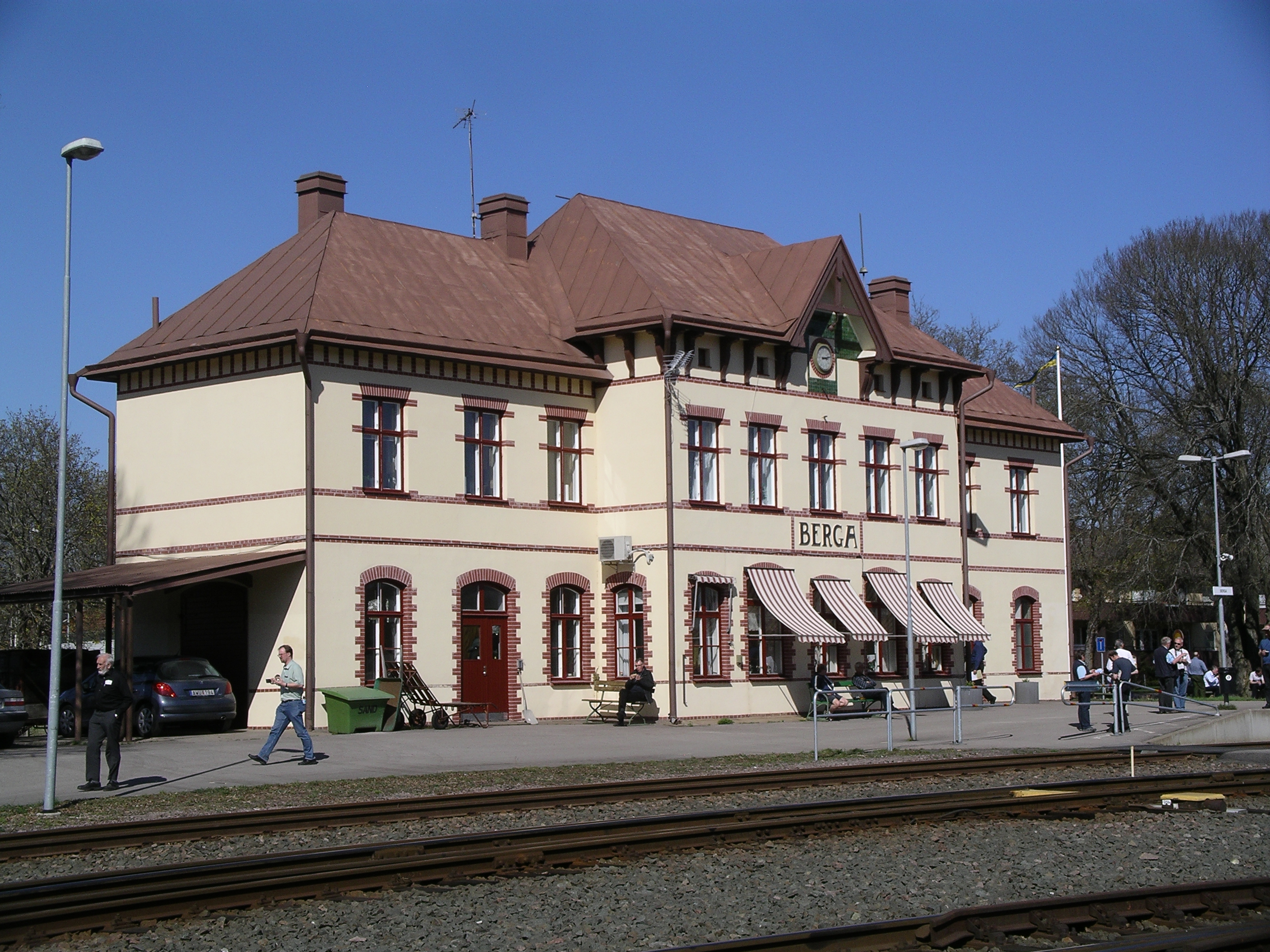
- Berga train station

- Location within Kalmar Location within Sweden
- Coordinates: 57°13′N 16°02′E
- Country: Sweden
- Province: Småland
- County: Kalmar County
- Municipality: Högsby Municipality

Area
  - Total: 1.44 km^{2} (0.56 sq mi)

Population (31 December 2023)
  - Total: 655
  - Density: 455/km^{2} (1,180/sq mi)
- Time zone: UTC+1 (CET)
  - Summer (DST): UTC+2 (CEST)

Berga is a locality situated in Högsby Municipality, Kalmar County, Sweden with 655 inhabitants in 2023.
