= Pauliström =

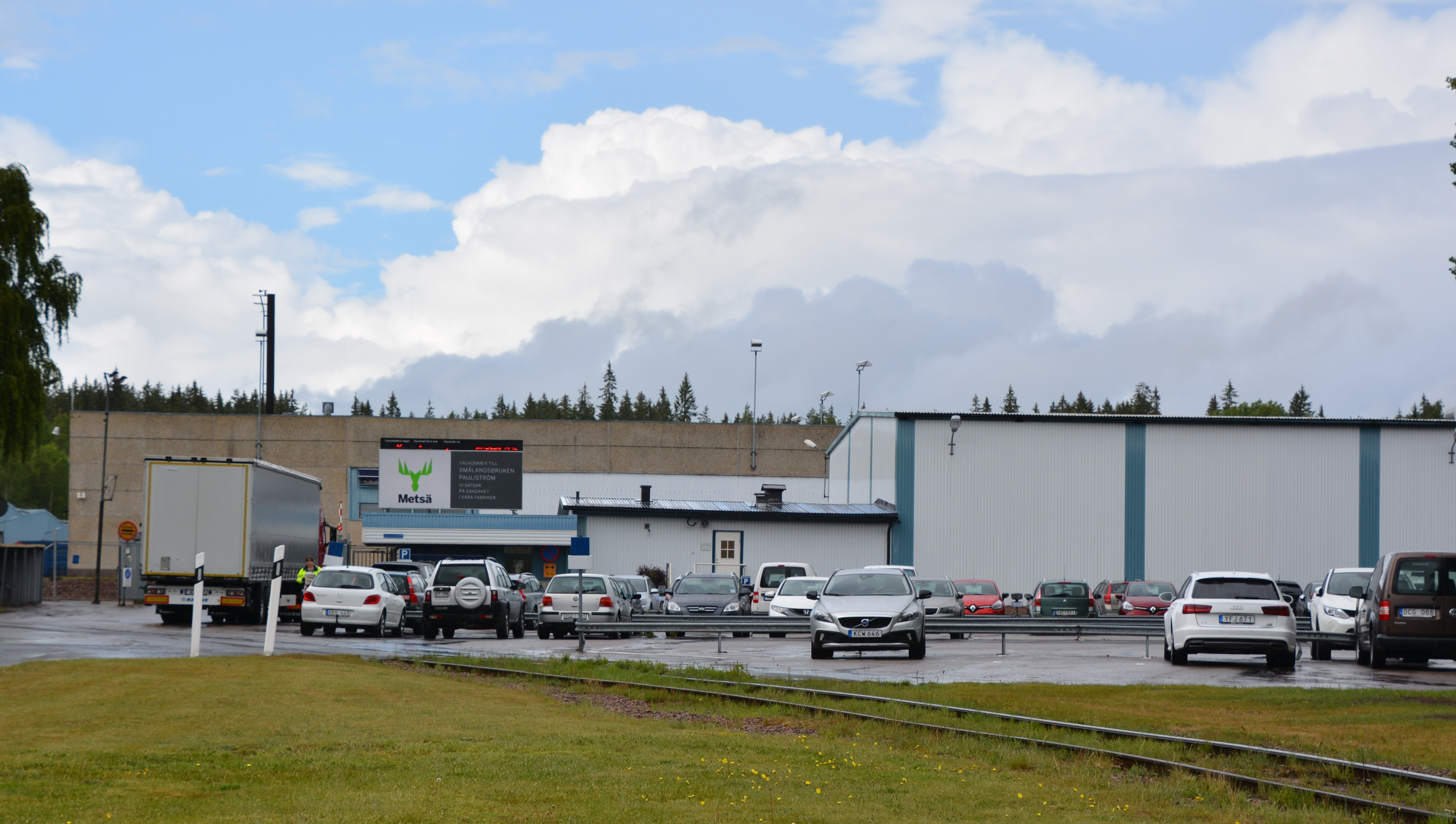
- Pauliströms bruk

- Location within Jönköping Location within Sweden
- Coordinates: 57°28′N 15°31′E
- Country: Sweden
- Province: Småland
- County: Jönköping County
- Municipality: Vetlanda Municipality

Area
  - Total: 0.62 km^{2} (0.24 sq mi)

Population (31 December 2010)
  - Total: 221
  - Density: 355/km^{2} (920/sq mi)
- Time zone: UTC+1 (CET)
  - Summer (DST): UTC+2 (CEST)
- Climate: Cfb

Pauliström is a locality situated in Vetlanda Municipality, Jönköping County, Sweden with 221 inhabitants in 2010.

== Photo gallery ==
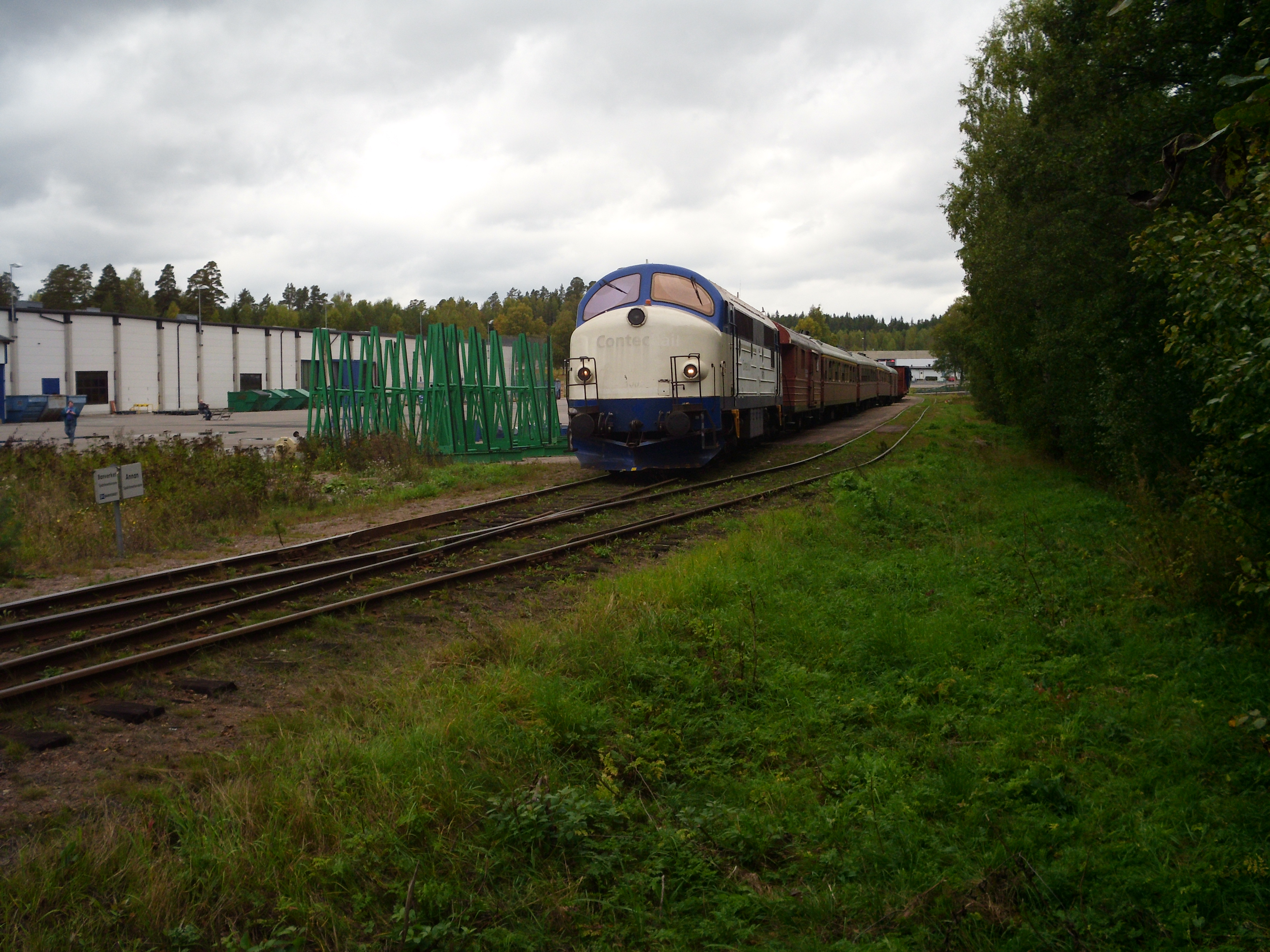
Tourist train on a business track of Pauliströms bruk at Pauliström (2013)

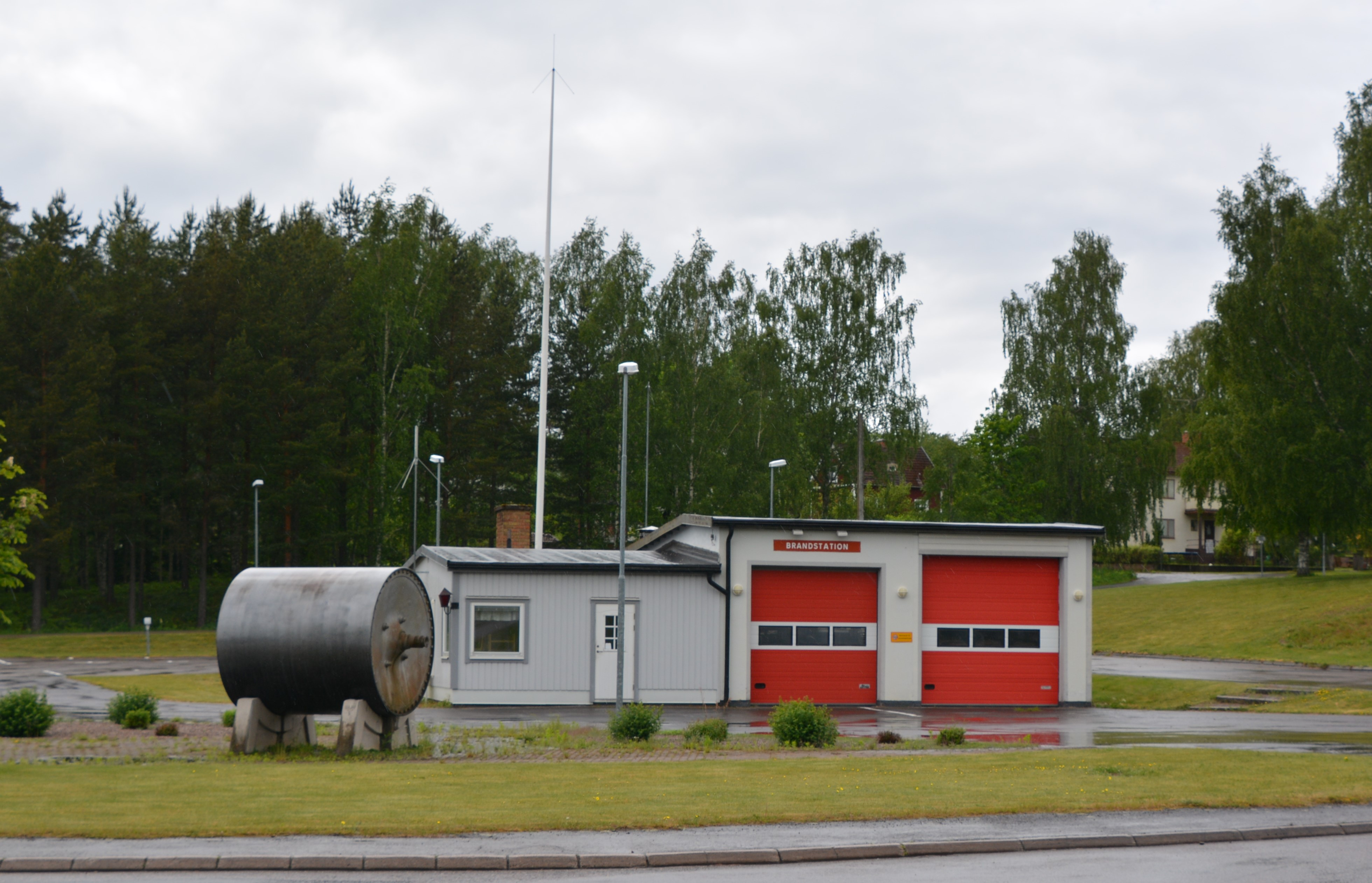
Pauliström Fire station
