= Holsbybrunn =

- Location within Jönköping Location within Sweden
- Coordinates: 57°26′N 15°12′E
- Country: Sweden
- Province: Småland
- County: Jönköping County
- Municipality: Vetlanda Municipality

Area
  - Total: 1.10 km^{2} (0.42 sq mi)

Population (31 December 2010)
  - Total: 729
  - Density: 660/km^{2} (1,700/sq mi)
- Time zone: UTC+1 (CET)
  - Summer (DST): UTC+2 (CEST)
- Climate: Cfb

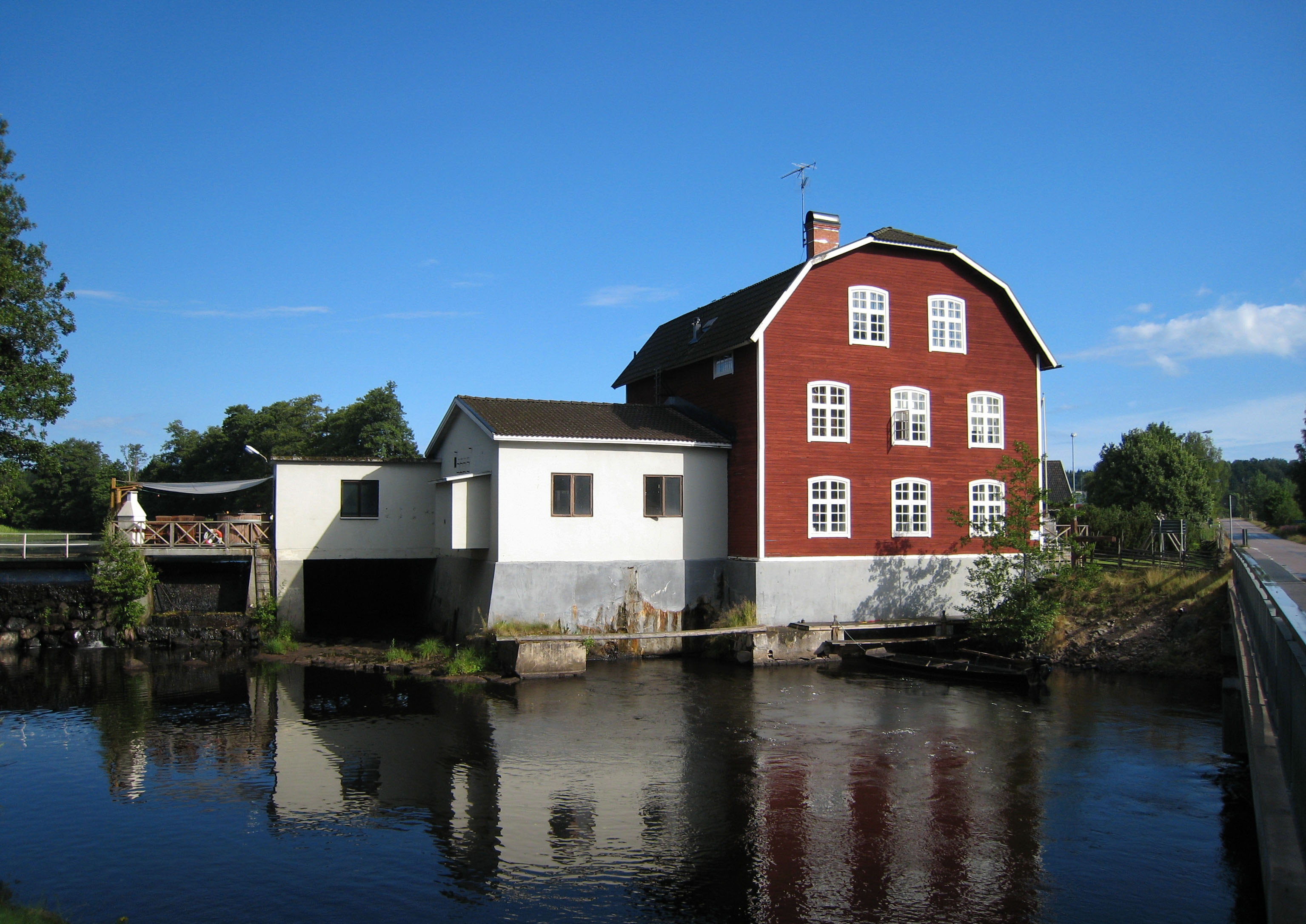
A historic mill in Holsbybrunn

Holsbybrunn is a locality situated in Vetlanda Municipality, Jönköping County, Sweden with 729 inhabitants in 2010. Ädelfors folkhögskola is located in Holsbybrunn. An international English speaking Bible School affiliated with Torchbearers International is also located in the locality as well as YWAM Småland, which runs a Discipleship Training School every year.
