= Vårdinge by folkhögskola =

Coordinates: 58°59′26″N 17°25′37″E

- Vårdinge; Sweden

Vårdinge by folkhögskola is a folk high school located near a lake in Vårdinge, Sweden.

Its focus is on Arts and Craftsmanship. The school is inspired by antroposophy and offers all standard courses that ensure a secondary school (gymnasium) diploma. It is at a commuter distance from Stockholm.

== Courses ==
Some of the courses available are:

- Art
- Woodcrafting
- Pottery
- Gardening
