= Kvillsfors =

- Location within Jönköping Location within Sweden
- Coordinates: 57°25′N 15°29′E
- Country: Sweden
- Province: Småland
- County: Kalmar County and Jönköping County
- Municipality: Hultsfred Municipality and Vetlanda Municipality

Area
  - Total: 0.95 km^{2} (0.37 sq mi)
- Elevation: 120 m (390 ft)

Population (31 December 2010)
  - Total: 500
  - Density: 528/km^{2} (1,370/sq mi)
- Time zone: UTC+1 (CET)
  - Summer (DST): UTC+2 (CEST)
- Climate: Cfb

Kvillsfors is a bimunicipal locality situated in Vetlanda Municipality, Jönköping County and Hultsfred Municipality, Kalmar County in Sweden with 500 inhabitants in 2010.
