= Högsby =

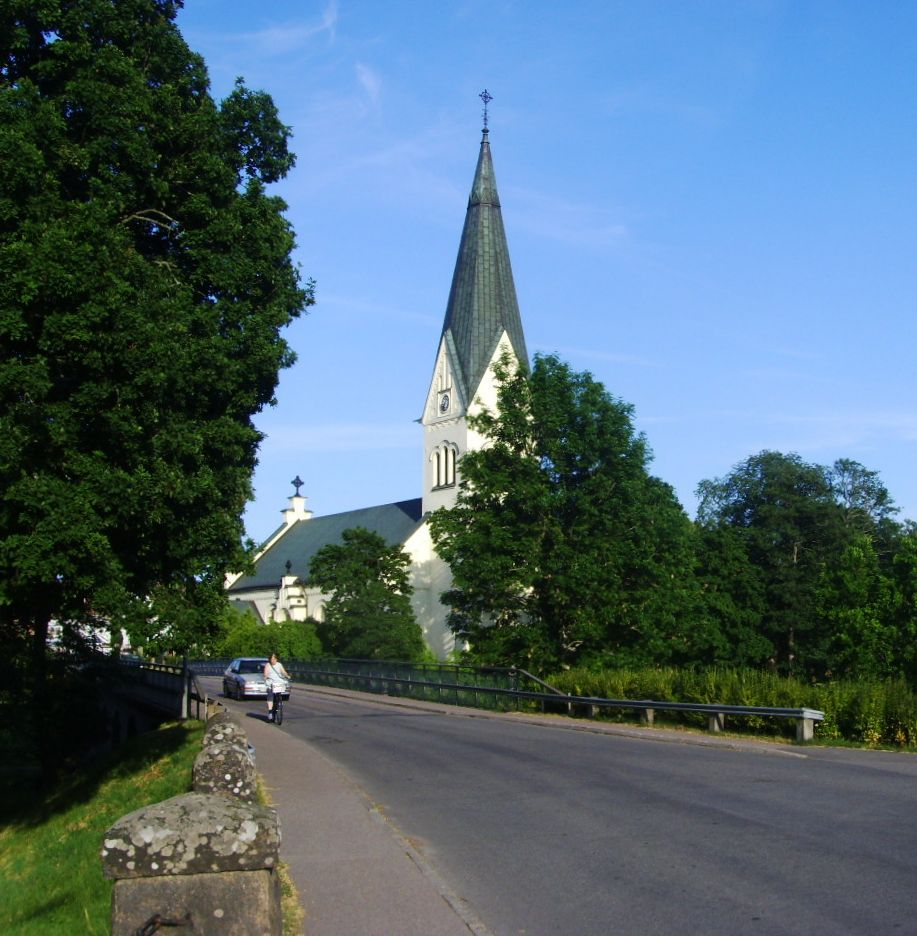
- Högsby Church

- Location within Kalmar Location within Sweden
- Coordinates: 57°10′N 16°02′E
- Country: Sweden
- Province: Småland
- County: Kalmar County
- Municipality: Högsby Municipality

Area
  - Total: 2.67 km^{2} (1.03 sq mi)

Population (31 December 2023)
  - Total: 1,872
  - Density: 701/km^{2} (1,820/sq mi)
- Time zone: UTC+1 (CET)
  - Summer (DST): UTC+2 (CEST)

Högsby is a locality and the seat of Högsby Municipality, Kalmar County, Sweden with 1,872 inhabitants in 2023.

== Sights ==
Högsby has the river Emån running through the town, which is commonly used for canoeing and fishing. A museum about the actress Greta Garbo, opened in 1998, is located in the center of Högsby. This is large due to that her mother originated from Högsby. Bokhultet is a nature reserve located outside Högsby; it has a significant number of rare plants and insects.

13% of the locality was foreign born in 2010, rising to 25% in 2017.
