= Mario Vasilj =

Swedish footballer (born 1983)

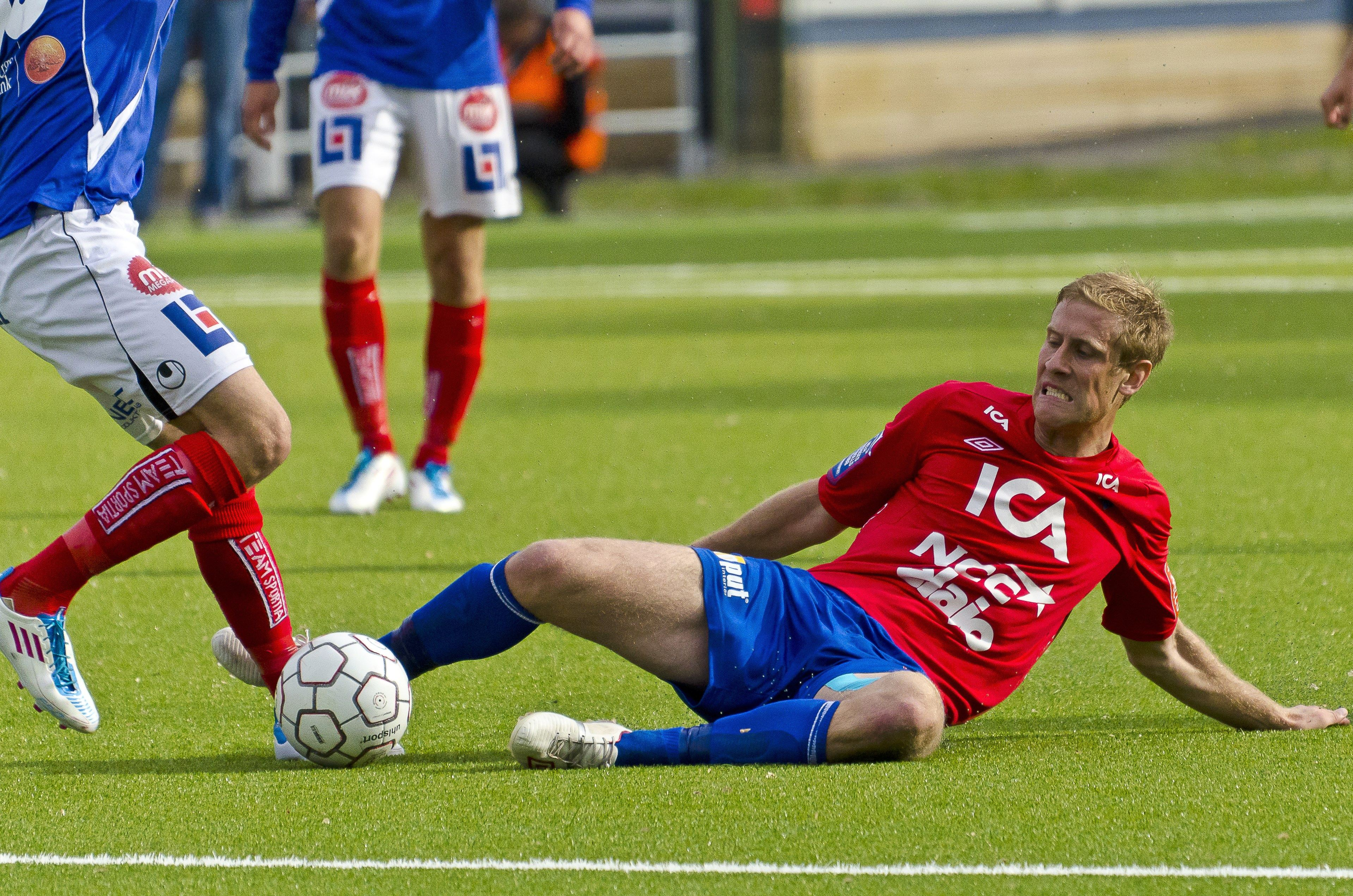
- Vasilj with Östers IF in 2011

Personal information
- Date of birth: 23 December 1983 (age 42)
- Place of birth: Sweden
- Height: 1.91 m (6 ft 3 in)
- Position: Central defender

Team information
- Current team: Östers IF (U21 head coach); Östers IF (assistant)

Youth career
- Rydaholms GoIF

Senior career*
Years	Team	Apps	(Gls)
2000–2005	Rydaholms GoIF		
2006–2018	Östers IF	279	(32)
2019	Rydaholms GoIF		

Managerial career
- 2020–: Östers IF (U21)
- 2020–: Östers IF (assistant)
- * Club domestic league appearances and goals

Mario Vasilj (born 23 December 1983) is a Swedish retired football central defender. He is the head coach of Östers IF's U21 team and assistant manager of the club's first team.

== Playing career ==
Vasilj joined Östers IF in 2006 from amateur side Rydaholms GoIF.

During Östers successful 2010 campaign to win Division 1 Södra, he played every single minute of the season up until the 23rd round, when he tore a PCL. After 12 long years, Vasilj finally left Östers IF after the 2018 season.

== Coaching career ==
After a season with Rydaholms GoIF in 2019, Vasilj decided to retire at the end of the year. On 29 January 2020, he returned to Östers IF as an assistant coach for the first team and head coach of the club's U21 team.
