= Rydaholms GoIF =

Swedish football club

- Full name: Rydaholms Gymnastik-och Idrottsförening
- Founded: 10 November 1930; 86 years
- Ground: Kungshall; Rydaholm, Sweden
- Capacity: 3,000
- Chairman: Johan Andersson; Frida Andersson (Football Section)
- League: Division 3 Sydöstra Götaland
- 2010: Division 3 Sydöstra Götaland, 6th
| Home colours | Away colours |

Rydaholms GoIF is a Swedish football club located in Rydaholm in Värnamo Municipality, Jönköping County.

== Background ==
Their foundation Rydaholms GoIF has participated mainly in the middle and lower divisions of the Swedish football league system. The club currently plays in Division 3 Sydöstra Götaland which is the fifth tier of Swedish football. They play their home matches at the Kungshall in Rydaholm.

Rydaholms GoIF are affiliated to Smålands Fotbollförbund.

== Recent history ==
In recent seasons Rydaholms GoIF have competed in the following divisions:

2011 – Division III, Sydöstra Götaland
2010 – Division III, Sydöstra Götaland
2009 – Division III, Sydöstra Götaland
2008 – Division III, Sydöstra Götaland
2007 – Division III, Sydöstra Götaland
2006 – Division II, Mellersta Götaland
2005 – Division III, Sydöstra Götaland
2004 – Division IV, Småland Västra Elit
2003 – Division IV, Småland Sydvästra
2002 – Division V, Småland Västra
2001 – Division V, Småland Västra
2000 – Division VI, Finnveden
1999 – Division VI, Alvesta

== Attendances ==
In recent seasons Rydaholms GoIF have had the following average attendances:

| Season | Average attendance | Division / Section | Level |
|---|---|---|---|
| 2005 | 221 | Div 3 Sydöstra Götaland | Tier 4 |
| 2006 | 264 | Div 2 Mellersta Götaland | Tier 4 |
| 2007 | 200 | Div 3 Sydöstra Götaland | Tier 5 |
| 2008 | 202 | Div 3 Sydöstra Götaland | Tier 5 |
| 2009 | 231 | Div 3 Sydöstra Götaland | Tier 5 |
| 2010 | 181 | Div 3 Sydöstra Götaland | Tier 5 |
| 2011 | 193 | Div 3 Sydöstra Götaland | Tier 5 |

* Attendances are provided in the Publikliga sections of the Svenska Fotbollförbundet website.
