= Småland Runic Inscription 48 =

Inscription in Småland, Sweden

The Småland Runic Inscription 48 is a Viking Age runestone engraved in Old Norse with the Younger Futhark runic alphabet in Torp, Forsheda parish, in Värnamo Municipality, Småland, and the style of the runestone is possibly runestone style RAK.

== Inscription ==
ufakʀs × s[a]ti × stin × þosi × eftiʀ × uta × sun sin × harþa [k]u...n × tr(i)(k) -u - [f]arþ
Ofæigʀ {} satti {} stæin {} þannsi {} æftiʀ {} Udda, {} sun sinn, {} harða go[ða]n {} dræng. [D]o [i] færð(?).
"Ófeigr placed this stone in memory of Oddi, his son, a very good valiant man (who) died on a journey.(?)"
