= Crane Day =

Crane Day (Swedish Trandagen) is observed on 25 March in Sweden in the southern parts of Kalmar County including Öland, as well as neighbouring areas such as Kronoberg and Blekinge, and other areas such as Värmland and Rydaholm.

The day is named after the cranes' return to Sweden at this time of the year. It is also traditionally connected with the Feast of the Annunciation which is observed around the same time.
