= Bor, Sweden =

Bor
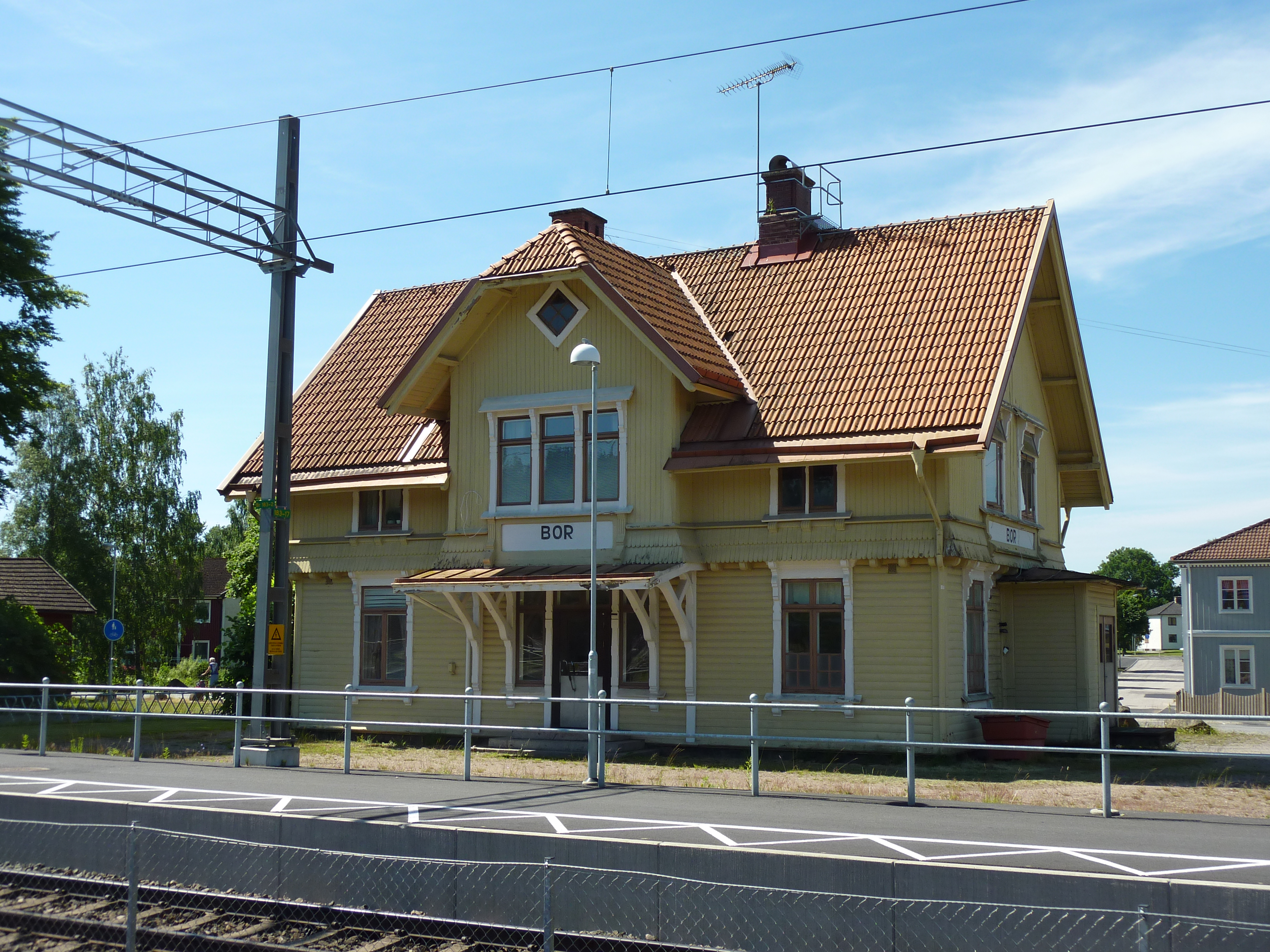
- Bor station, Bor, Sweden

- Location within Jönköping Location within Sweden
- Coordinates: 57°07′N 14°10′E
- Country: Sweden
- Province: Småland
- County: Jönköping County
- Municipality: Värnamo Municipality

Area
  - Total: 1.57 km^{2} (0.61 sq mi)

Population (31 December 2010)
  - Total: 1,256
  - Density: 798/km^{2} (2,070/sq mi)
- Time zone: UTC+1 (CET)
  - Summer (DST): UTC+2 (CEST)

Bor (Swedish pronunciation: [ˈboːr]) is a locality situated in Värnamo Municipality, Jönköping County, Sweden with 1,256 inhabitants in 2010.

== Narrow gauge railway ==
Bor is the terminus of the 600 mm (1 ft 11 5/8 in) narrow gauge Ohsabanan, a museum railway from Os, 15 km away. The railway was constructed in the summer of 1910 and runs steam trains.

== Notable people ==
- Anders Henriksson, speedway rider
- Freddy Söderberg - footballer
