= Forsheda =

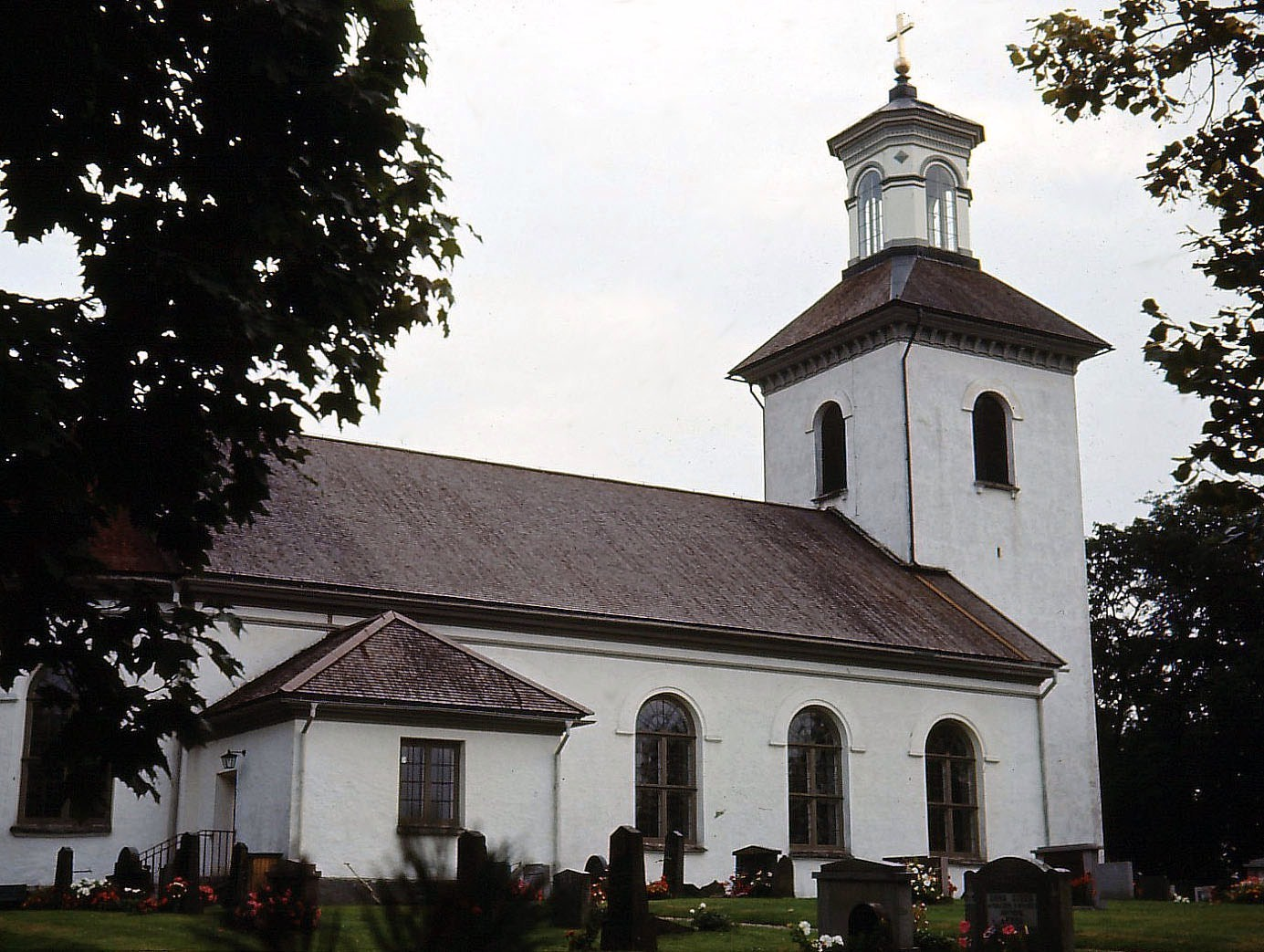
- Forsheda church, belonging to Forshedabygden's parish in Växjö diocese. The church is located in the community Forsheda in the municipality of Värnamo .

- Location within Jönköping Location within Sweden
- Coordinates: 57°09′N 13°49′E
- Country: Sweden
- Province: Småland
- County: Jönköping County
- Municipality: Värnamo Municipality

Area
  - Total: 1.49 km^{2} (0.58 sq mi)

Population (31 December 2010)
  - Total: 1,459
  - Density: 982/km^{2} (2,540/sq mi)
- Time zone: UTC+1 (CET)
  - Summer (DST): UTC+2 (CEST)

Forsheda is a locality situated in Värnamo Municipality, Jönköping County, Sweden with 1,459 inhabitants in 2010.

== Notable people ==
- John Ljunggren - Olympic race walker
