= Bredaryd =

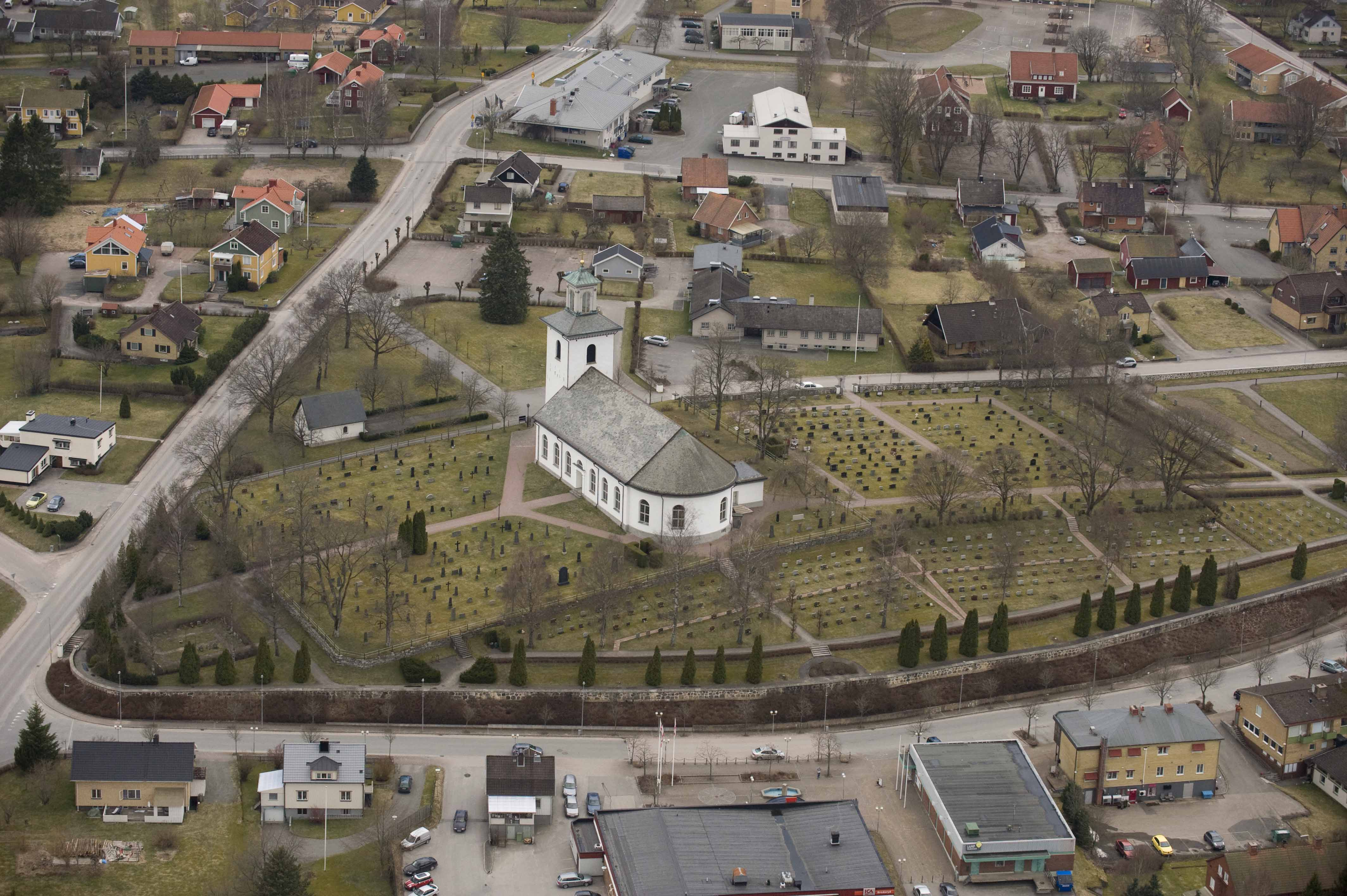

- Location within Jönköping Location within Sweden
- Coordinates: 57°10′N 13°44′E
- Country: Sweden
- Province: Småland
- County: Jönköping County
- Municipality: Värnamo Municipality

Area
  - Total: 1.99 km^{2} (0.77 sq mi)

Population (31 December 2010)
  - Total: 1,466
  - Density: 737/km^{2} (1,910/sq mi)
- Time zone: UTC+1 (CET)
  - Summer (DST): UTC+2 (CEST)

Bredaryd is a locality situated in Värnamo Municipality, Jönköping County, Sweden with 1,466 inhabitants in 2010.

== Notable people ==
- Anna Anvegård - footballer
- Allan Larsson - politician
- Eric Lindros - former hockey player
