= Kärda =

- Location within Jönköping Location within Sweden
- Coordinates: 57°10′N 13°55′E
- Country: Sweden
- Province: Småland
- County: Jönköping County
- Municipality: Värnamo Municipality

Area
  - Total: 0.37 km^{2} (0.14 sq mi)

Population (31 December 2010)
  - Total: 320
  - Density: 857/km^{2} (2,220/sq mi)
- Time zone: UTC+1 (CET)
  - Summer (DST): UTC+2 (CEST)

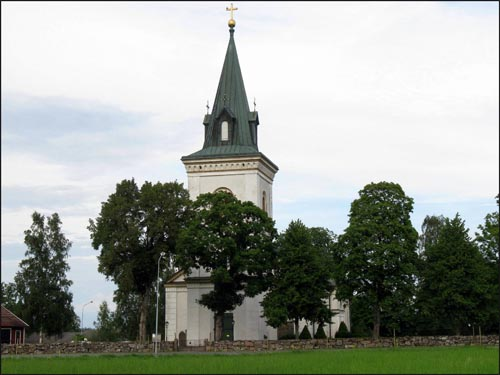
Church in Kärda

Kärda (Swedish pronunciation: [ˈɕæ̌ːɖa]) is a locality situated in Värnamo Municipality, Jönköping County, Sweden with 320 inhabitants in 2010.
