= Bruno Mathsson =

Swedish furniture designer and architect

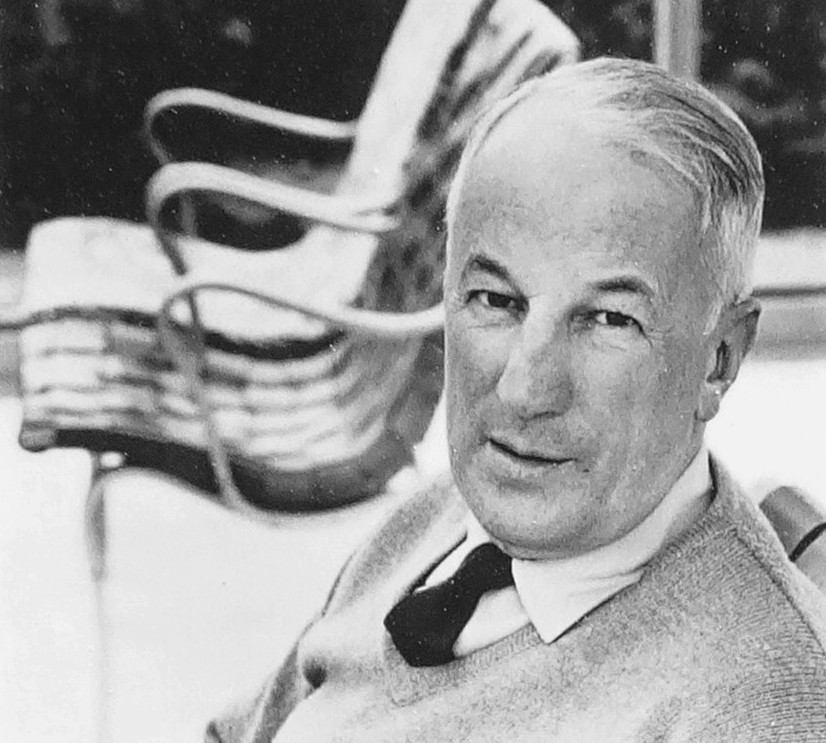
- Born: 13 January 1907; Värnamo
- Died: 17 August 1988; Värnamo
- Resting place: Värnamo north cemetery
- Occupations: Architect, designer
- Awards: Honorary Royal Designer for Industry (1978)
- Website: mathsson.se

Signature
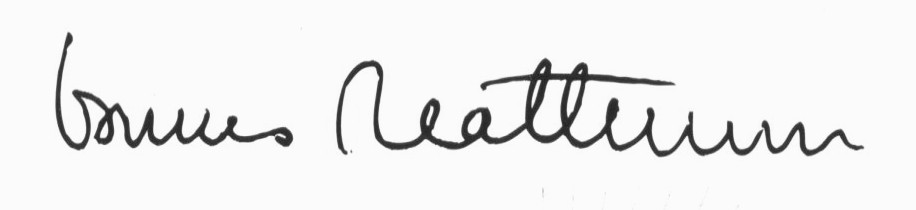

Bruno Mathsson (13 January 1907 – 17 August 1988) was a Swedish architect and furniture designer whose ideas aligned with functionalism, modernism, as well as the Swedish crafts tradition.

== Biography ==
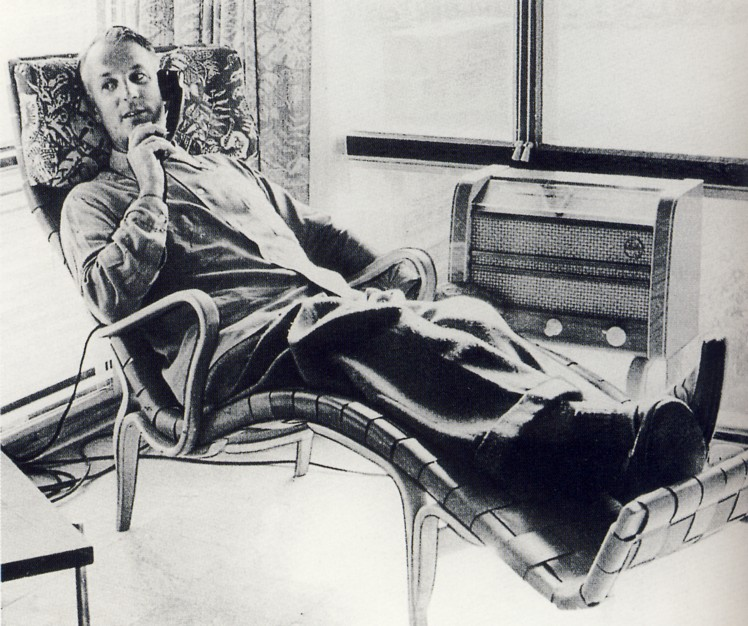
Bruno Mathsson in 1950

Mathsson was raised in the town of Värnamo in the Småland region of Sweden, the son of a master cabinet maker. After a short time of education in school, he started to work in his father's gallery. He soon found a great interest in furniture and especially chairs, their function and design. In the 1920s and 30s, he developed a technique for building bentwood chairs with hemp webbing. The first model, called the Grasshopper, was used at Värnamo Hospital in 1931.

Edgar Kaufmann Jr., director of the Industrial Design Department at the Museum of Modern Art (MOMA), collected Mathsson's chairs and included them in several exhibitions in the 1940s. Kaufmann considered Mathsson's importance in furniture design on par with that of Alvar Aalto. Kaufmann and his family also had a Mathsson chair at their house Fallingwater.

Mathsson was also an accomplished architect; he completed about 100 structures in the 1940s and 50s. He was the first architect in Sweden to build all-glass structures with heated floors. His furniture showroom in Värnamo (1950) was a significant example; it is well-preserved and open to the public today. For his glass houses, he developed double- and triple-pane insulated glass units called "Bruno-Pane".

He travelled extensively in the United States and was strongly influenced by the solar houses of George Fred Keck. Mathsson's architecture was also influenced by a visit to the Eames House by Charles and Ray Eames in March 1949, just as it was being completed.

== Works ==
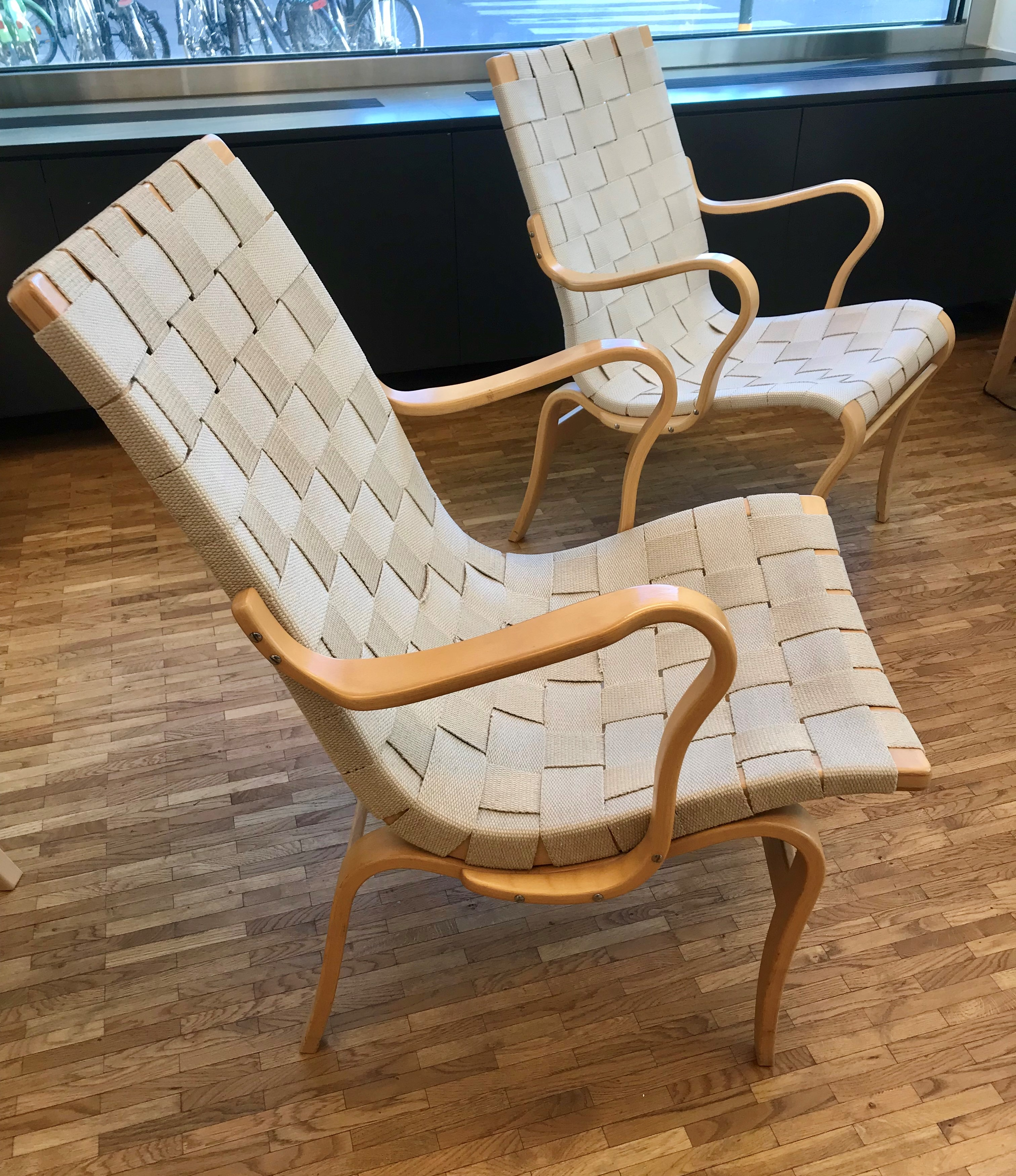
Mathsson's Eva and Mina chairs

=== Furniture ===
- Grasshopper (1931)
- Mimat (1932)
- Pernilla (1934)
- The Eva Chair (1935)
- Folding table (1935)
- Paris Daybed (1937)
- Swivel chair (1939–1940)
- Pernilla Lounge
- Jetson Chair
- Super-Ellipse™ table series, with Piet Hein (1966)
- Annika nesting tables (1968)
- The Karin chair (1969)
- Milton Swivel chair (1975)

=== Architecture ===
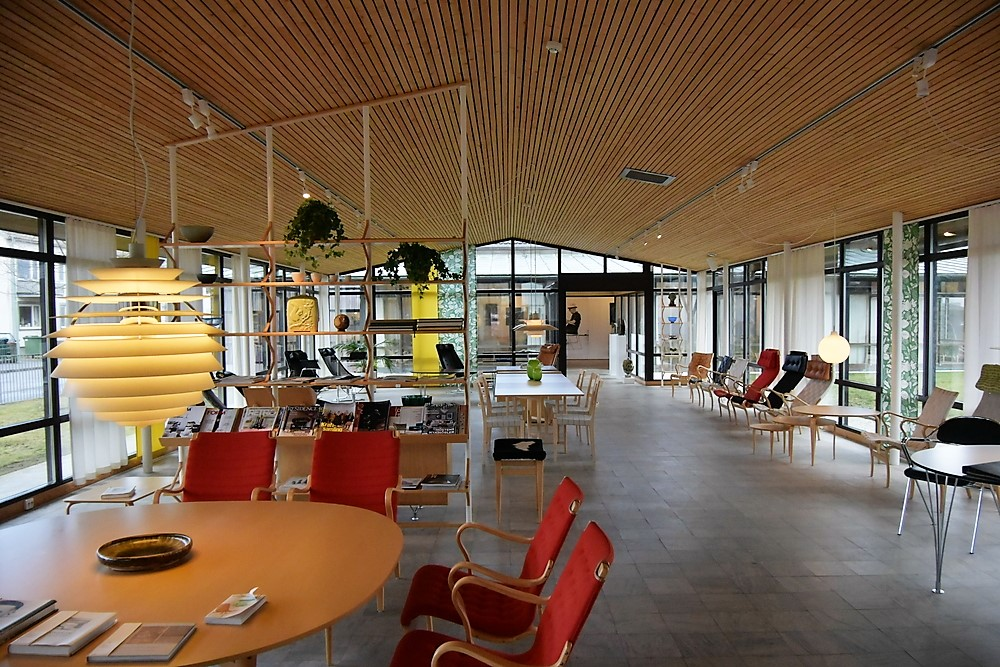
Bruno Mathsson furniture showroom, Värnamo (1950)

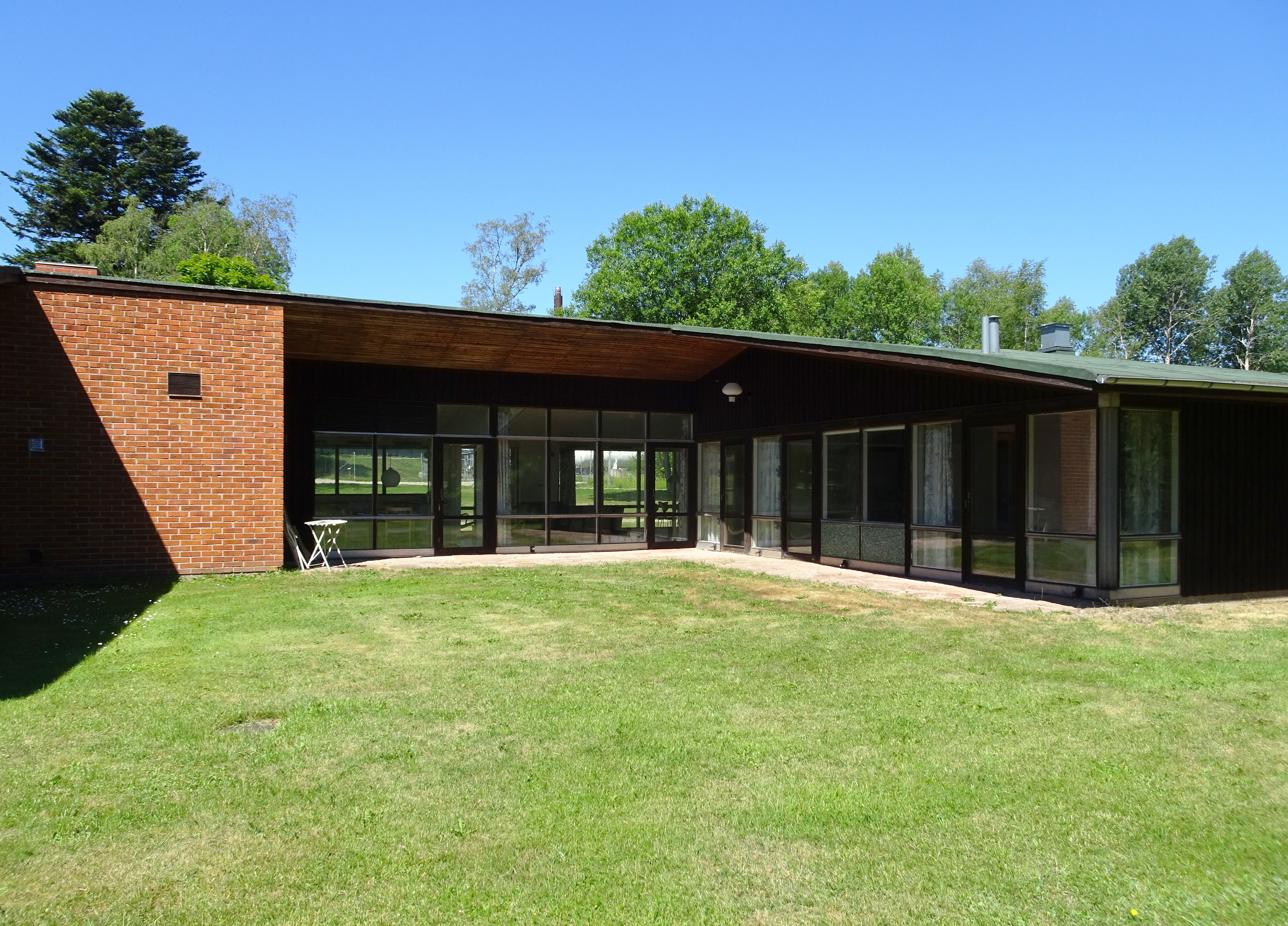
Kosta Glashus, Kosta Glassworks (1956)

- Bruno Mathsson furniture showroom, Värnamo (1950)
- house at Danderyd (1955)
- Villa Prenker, Kungsör (1955)
- Kosta Glassworks exhibition hall and worker's residences (Kosta Glashus), Kosta (1956)
- weekend cottage at Frösakull (1960)
  - "one of the most daring examples of his glass houses."
- Södrakull, outside Värnamo (1965)
