= Värnamo =

Town in southern Sweden

Värnamo Wernamo (historic)
- Town
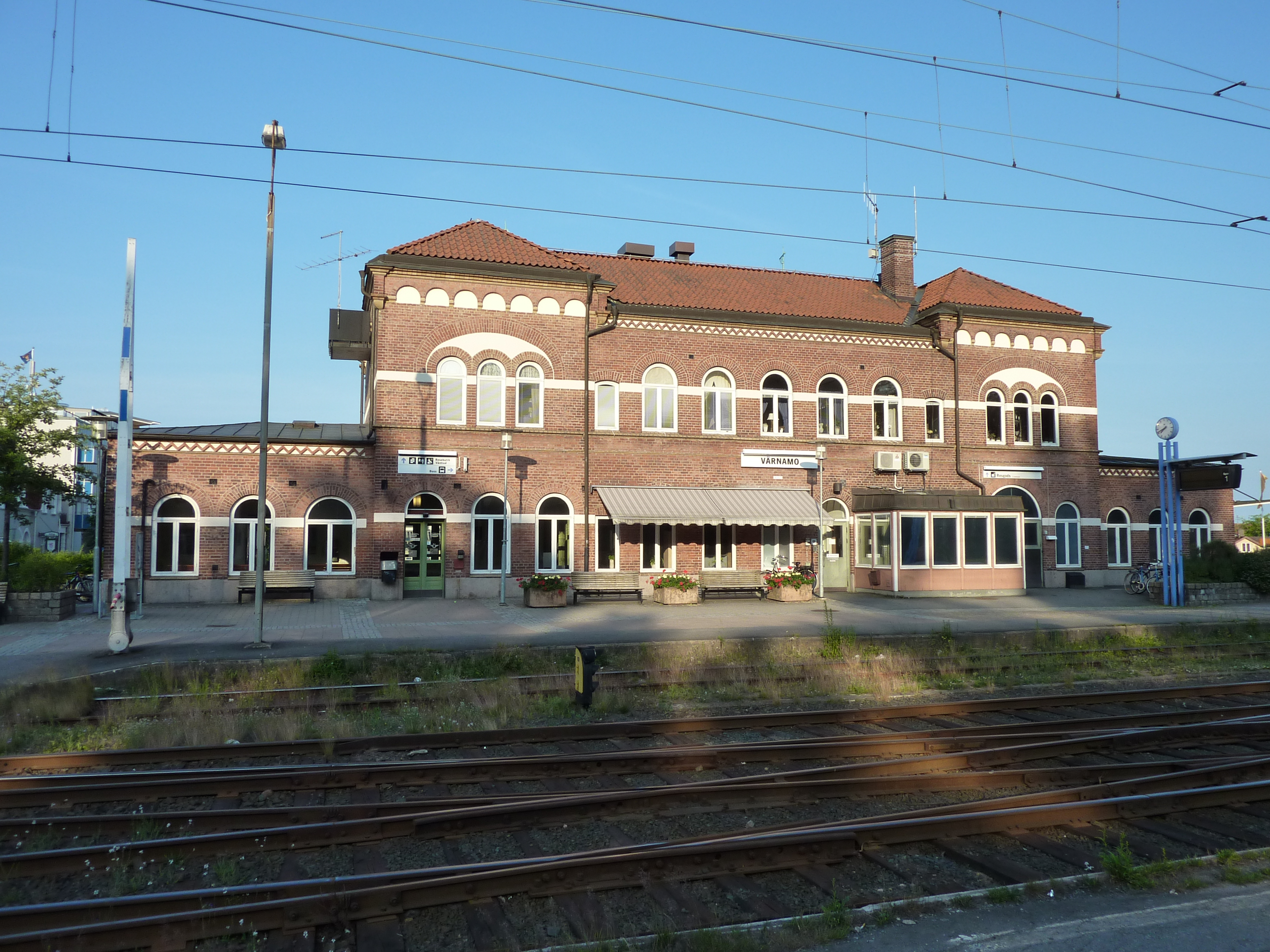
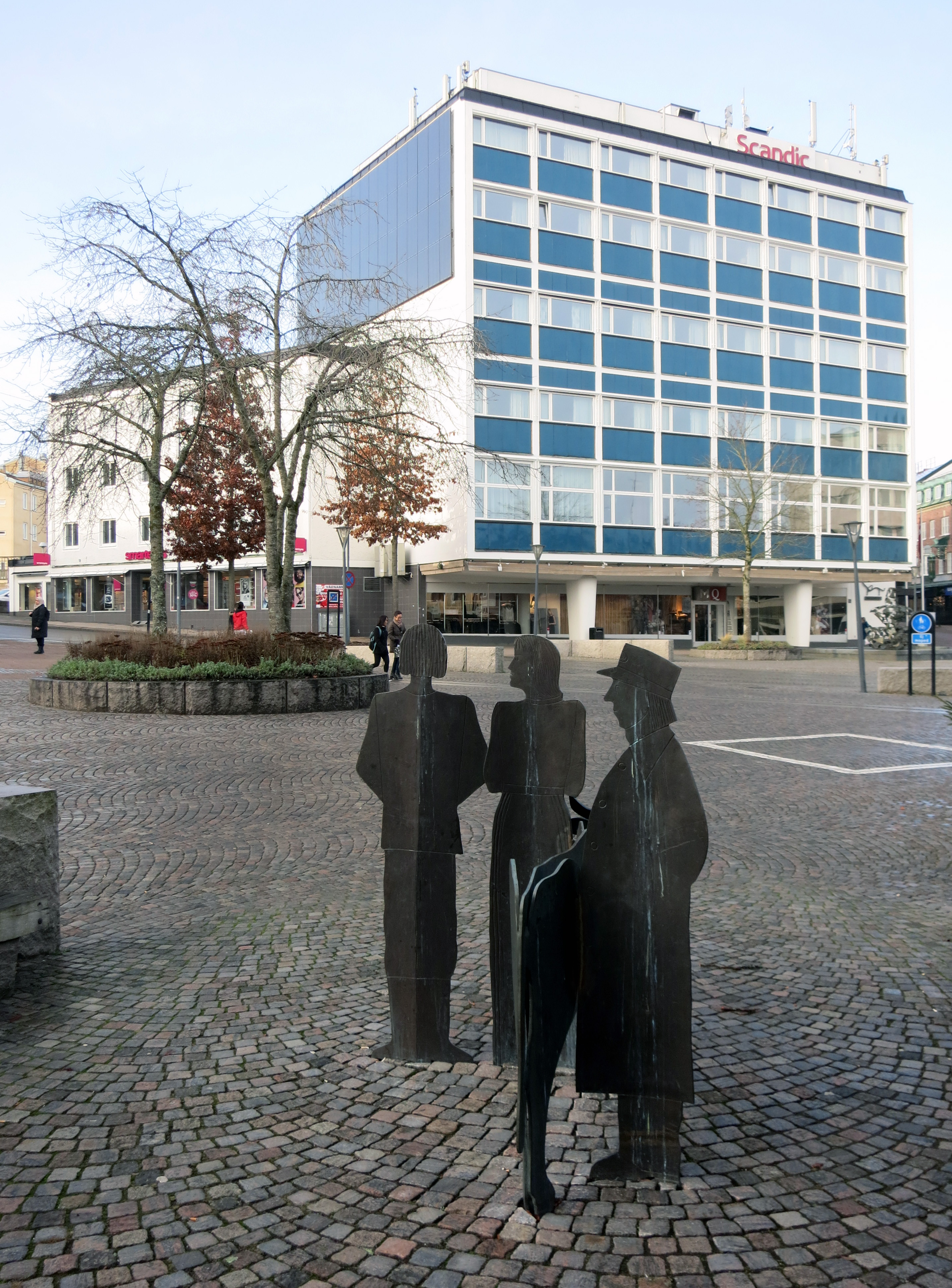
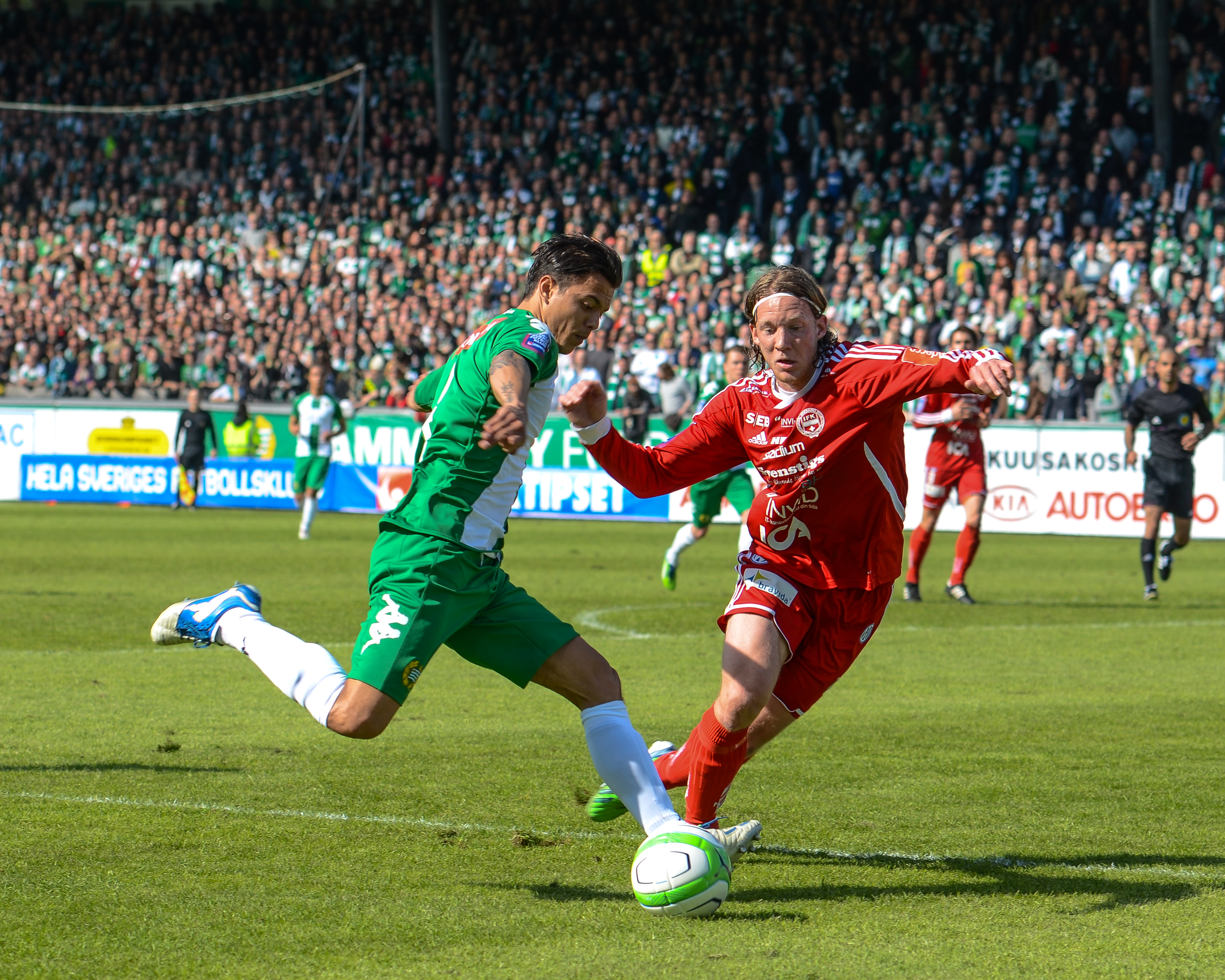
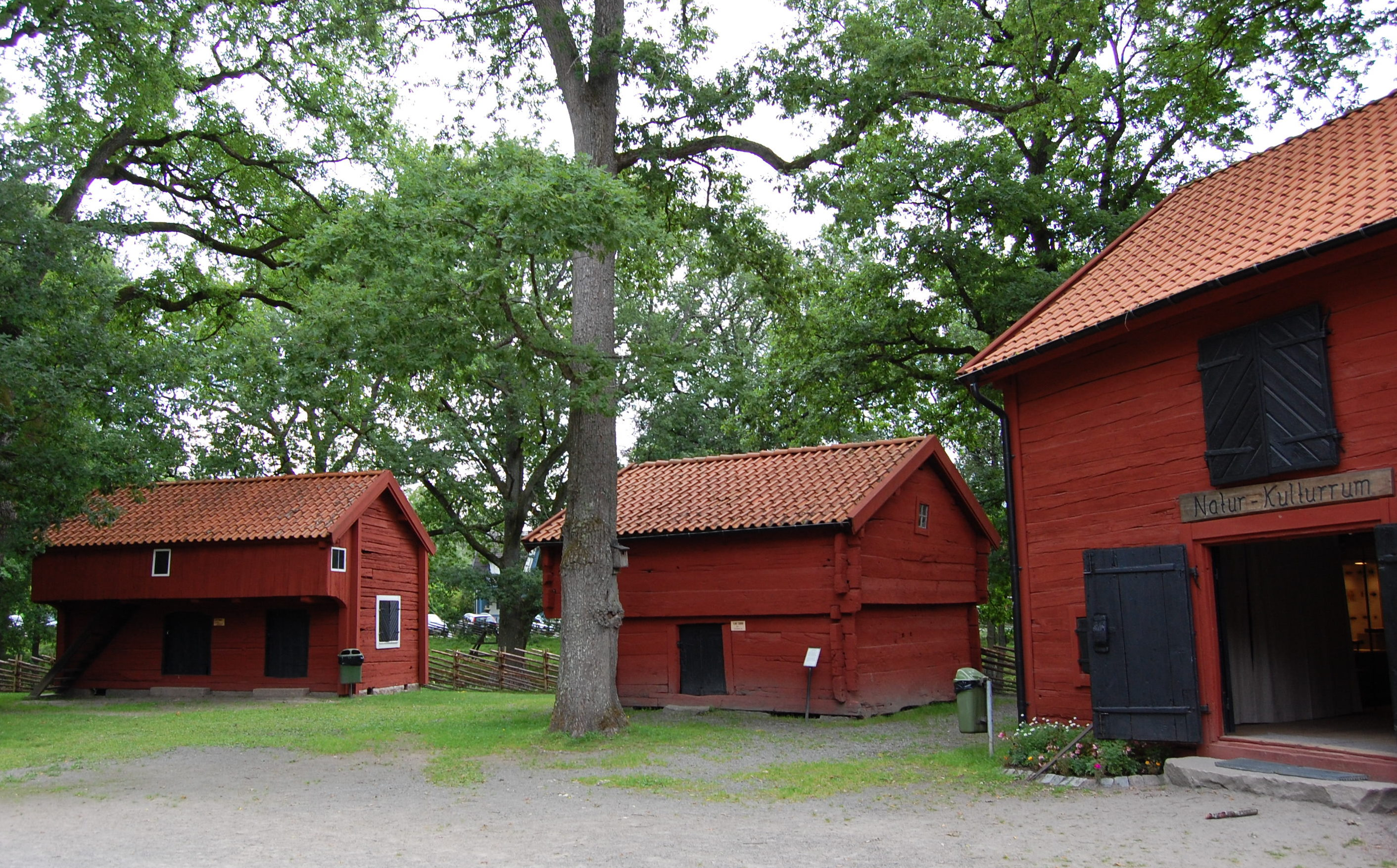
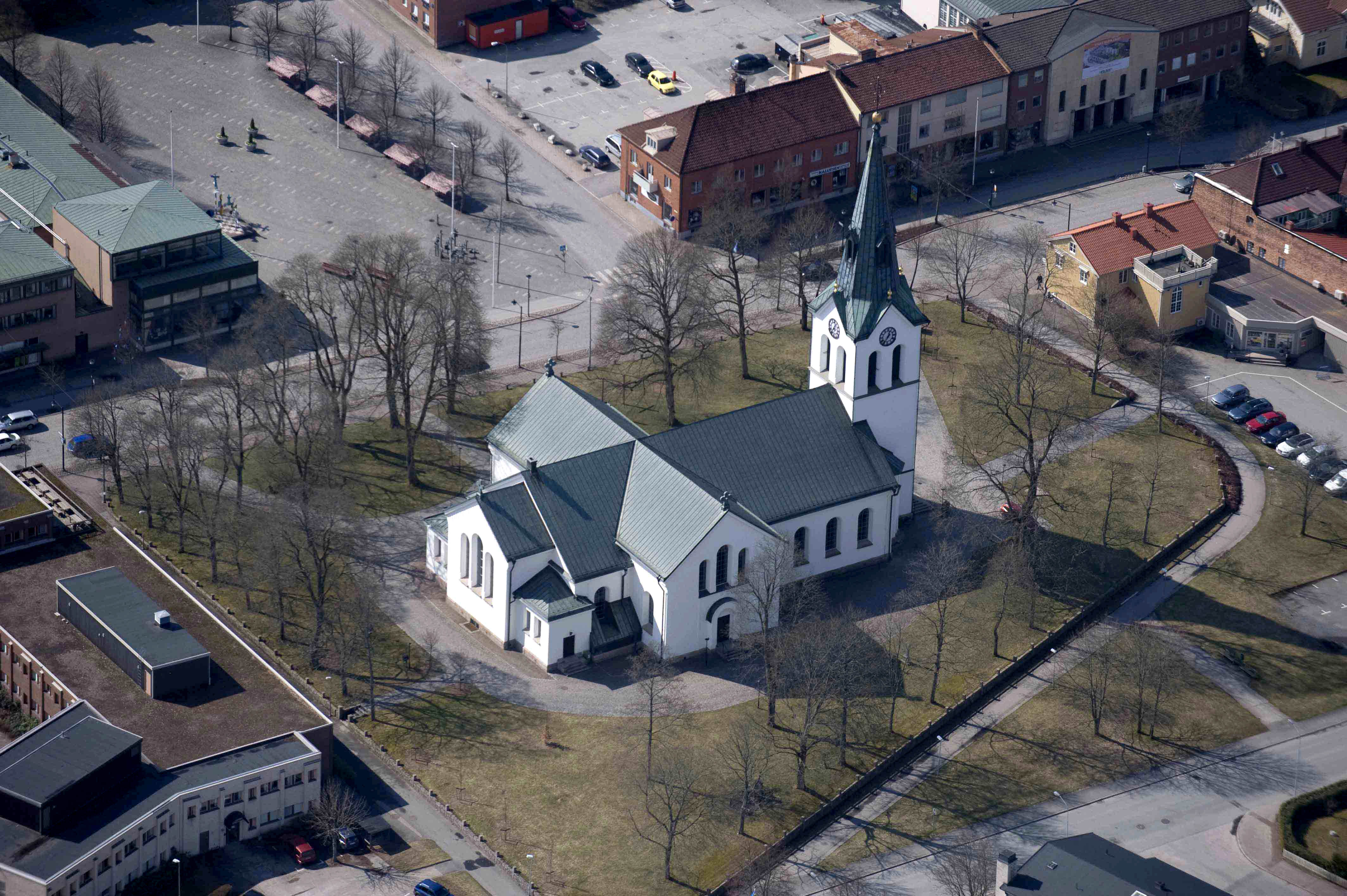
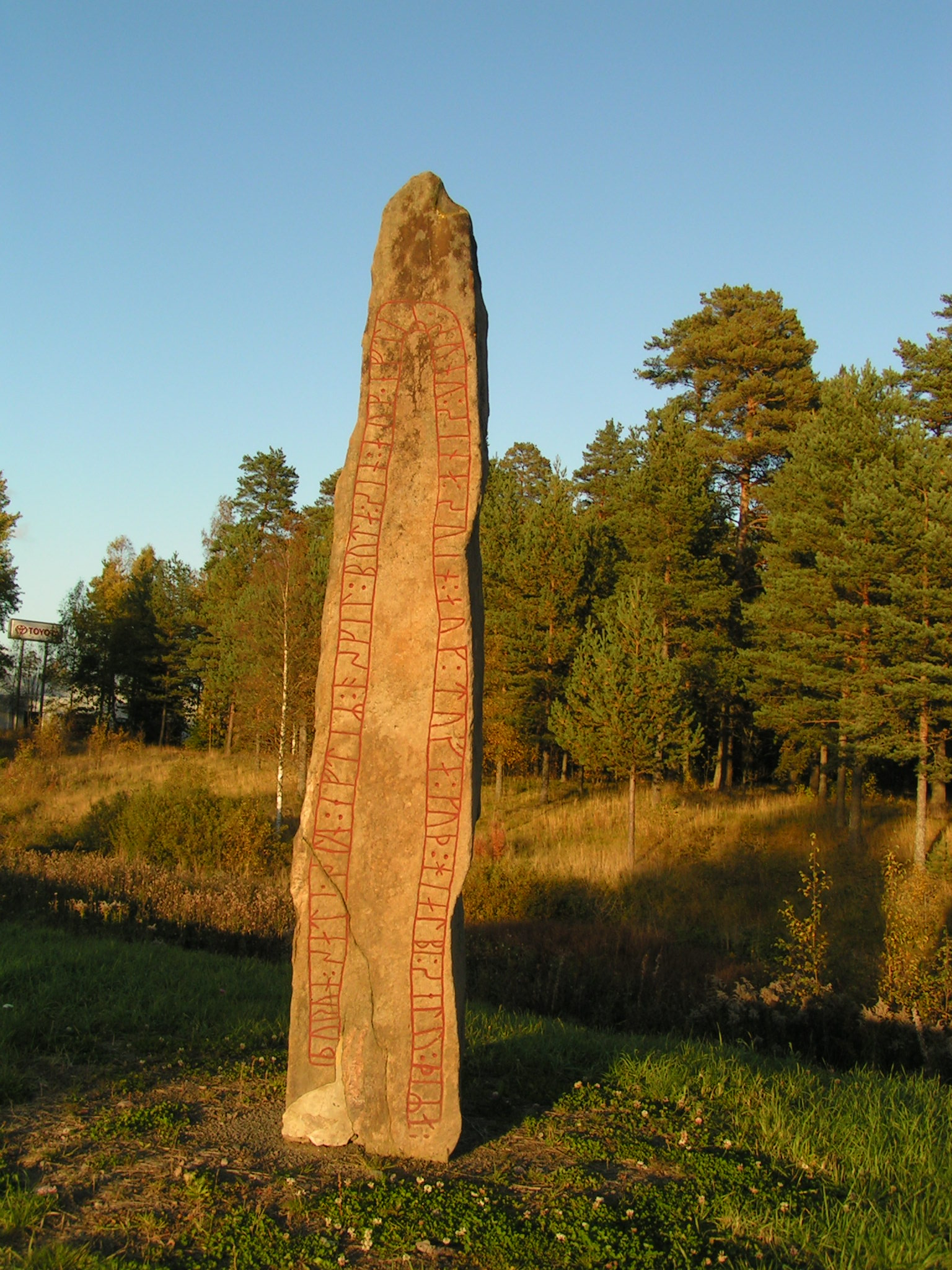
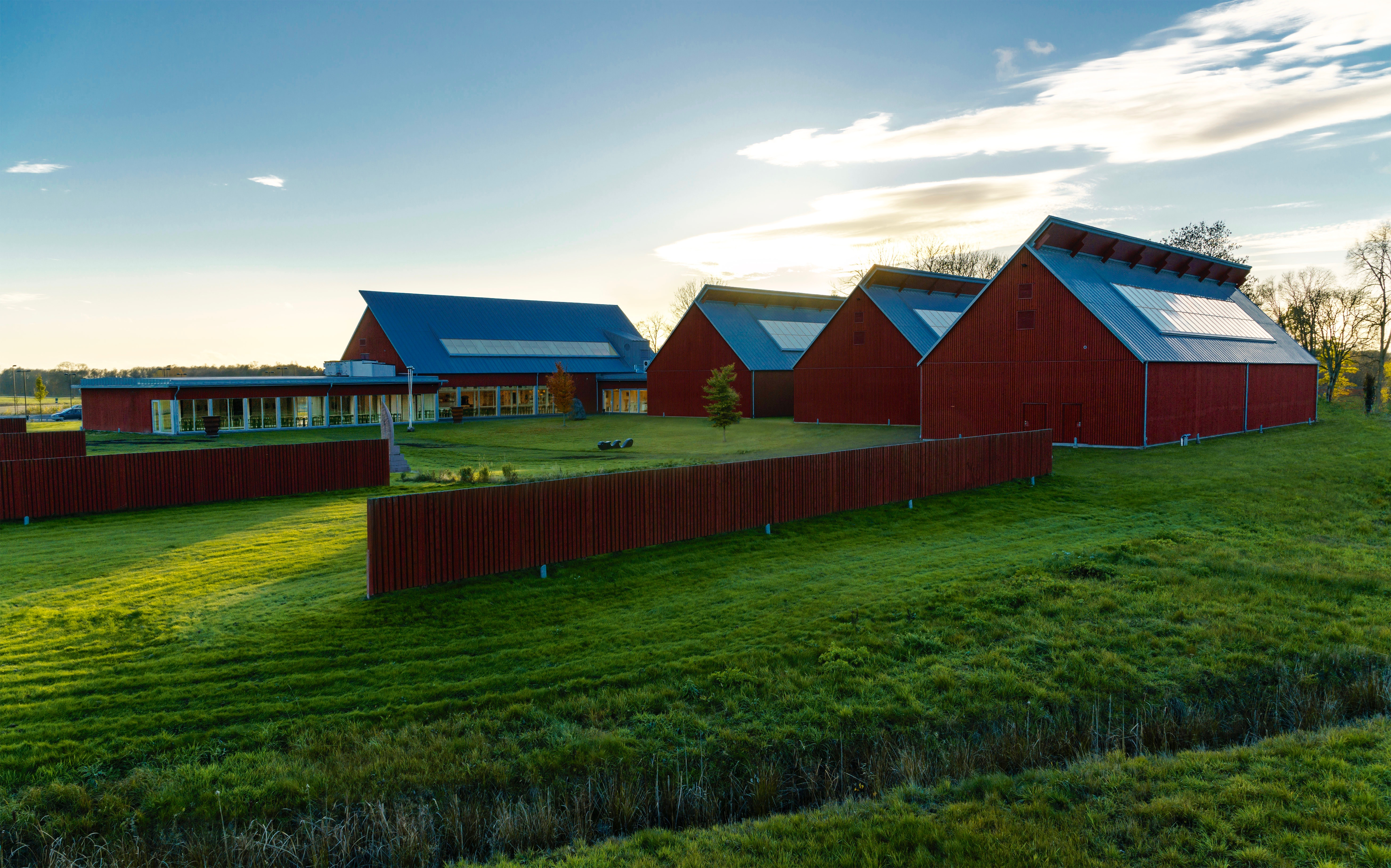
- Clockwise from top: Värnamo railway station, IFK Värnamo, Värnamo kyrka, Vandalorum, a runestone, Apladalen, and Scandic hotel and statues of Per and Kersti.
- Etymology: from old Swedish värn (sconce) and mo (sandy flat land)
- Location within Sweden
- Coordinates: 57°11′N 14°02′E
- Country: Sweden
- Province: Småland
- County: Jönköping County
- Municipality: Värnamo Municipality
- Lydköping: 1620
- Friköping: 1860
- Charter: 1920

Government
  - Type: Municipal council
  - Body: Värnamo Municipality
  - Chair: Stefan Widerberg (Centre Party)

Area
  - Land: 12.14 km^{2} (4.69 sq mi)

Population (2023-12-31)
  - Total: 20,273
  - Rank: 65th
  - Density: 1,670/km^{2} (4,325/sq mi)
- Demonym: Värnamobo (sv)
- Time zone: UTC+01:00 (CET)
  - Summer (DST): UTC+02:00 (CEST)
- Postal code: 331 XX
- Area code: 0370
- Website: varnamo.se (in Swedish)

Värnamo (pronounced [ˈvæ̂ːɳaˌmu]), historically known as Wernamo, is a town in Jönköping County in the south of Sweden. It is situated on the river Lagan just north of the lake Vidöstern. It is the seat of Värnamo Municipality and has 19,822 inhabitants as of 31 December 2020. The name comes from old Swedish värn (sconce) and mo (sandy flat land).

== History ==
Historical population
| Year | Pop. | ±% |
|---|---|---|
| 1892 | 708 | — |
| 1910 | 1,141 | +61.2% |
| 1920 | 3,664 | +221.1% |
| 1930 | 4,054 | +10.6% |
| 1940 | 5,608 | +38.3% |
| 1950 | 11,377 | +102.9% |
| 1960 | 10,916 | −4.1% |
| 1970 | 14,962 | +37.1% |
| 1980 | 15,838 | +5.9% |
| 1990 | 16,535 | +4.4% |
| 2000 | 17,629 | +6.6% |
| 2010 | 18,696 | +6.1% |
| 2020 | 19,778 | +5.8% |
Source: 1892: 1910: 1920-1950: From 1960:

Värnamo traces its history back to a village in the medieval age; the first written mention of it stems from the 13th century. It came into existence as a village to the eastern side of a fordable place over the Lagan, a river that for large parts is difficult to travel by. As there are also smaller streams to the south and west of this location, it was considered something of a safeguard, leading to its name being amalgamated from the two Swedish words värn, which means safeguard, and mo which is a geographical location reference describing the kind of land on which the town is situated. The word mo actually means that the soil consists of fine sand, sometimes making the land surrounding the river bog or barren.

Värnamo came to be the centre of Östbo Härad, an archaic form of judicial district, and thus a seat of trade and commerce. When Värnamo became a köping in 1659 it was given formal rights to host markets, falling under the jurisdiction of the city of Jönköping.

The town of Värnamo was insignificant for a long time, but with the Swedish population growth and industrialization in the 19th century it expanded, becoming an independent köping in 1859. Dense forests and industrial water power spurned the furniture industry and forges run by water power. The Swedish railroad nets spurred to enhance its industrial life, leading to a population increasing from 1,141 people in 1910 to 3,664 in 1920, and making it significant enough to get the title of a city on 1 November 1920, whereby it became one of the now only historical Cities of Sweden. The chosen city arms depicts the traditional location by the Lagan.

== Geography ==
Fourteen percent of the total area in Värnamo Municipality is made up of water. Seventy percent of the land area is covered by forests (of which 90 percent is productive), 7 percent is arable, 3 percent is suitable for grazing and 5 percent is built up.

Climate data for Hagshult 1961-1990 (13 km northeast of Värnamo)
| Month | Jan | Feb | Mar | Apr | May | Jun | Jul | Aug | Sep | Oct | Nov | Dec | Year |
|---|---|---|---|---|---|---|---|---|---|---|---|---|---|
| Mean daily maximum °C (°F) | −0.4 (31.3) | −0.1 (31.8) | 4.7 (40.5) | 10.3 (50.5) | 16.8 (62.2) | 20.5 (68.9) | 21.3 (70.3) | 20.1 (68.2) | 15.9 (60.6) | 10.5 (50.9) | 4.7 (40.5) | 1.0 (33.8) | 10.4 (50.8) |
| Daily mean °C (°F) | −3.5 (25.7) | −3.6 (25.5) | −0.5 (31.1) | 3.8 (38.8) | 9.8 (49.6) | 13.8 (56.8) | 14.9 (58.8) | 13.9 (57.0) | 10.3 (50.5) | 6.4 (43.5) | 1.7 (35.1) | −1.9 (28.6) | 5.4 (41.8) |
| Mean daily minimum °C (°F) | −6.5 (20.3) | −7.1 (19.2) | −5.7 (21.7) | −2.7 (27.1) | 2.7 (36.9) | 7.1 (44.8) | 8.5 (47.3) | 7.7 (45.9) | 4.7 (40.5) | 2.3 (36.1) | −1.3 (29.7) | −4.8 (23.4) | 0.4 (32.7) |
Source 1: SMHI Open Data
Source 2: SMHI Monthly Data 2002–2018

== Demographics ==
Värnamo is the largest locality in Värnamo Municipality with 57 percent of the total population. It is situated in the Swedish Bible Belt and has a high concentration of free churches.

Värnamo has a significant Bosnian and Balkan population. There are six times more persons born in Bosnia and Herzegovina and three times more in Yugoslavia than the national average. Together they make up five percent of Värnamo Municipality's total population and a quarter of the foreign-born population.

== Economy ==
3M is the largest private employer with 225 employees and Värnamo Municipality is the largest public employer with 2,774 employees as of November 2020. The largest companies based in Värnamo by number of employees (including outside Värnamo) are Liljedahl Group AB, Bufab AB, Sandahlsbolagen Sweden AB and DS Smith Packaging Sweden AB.

== Governance ==
Värnamo is governed by Värnamo Municipality.

== Culture ==
Apladalen is a nature park and an open-air museum located in the center of Värnamo. It has some preserved buildings from the 18th and 19th centuries, a handicraft shop, a café and a large playground. There are also live animals, such as sheep, goats, rabbits and hens. In Apladalen you can also find a statue of the lovers Per and Kersi, a fictional couple who met at the market in Värnamo and fell in love.

== Attractions ==
Gummifabriken ("The rubber factory") is a former rubber factory that has been renovated and rebuilt. It contains the local library, Madame Brasserie & Café, an auditorium with 393 seats, Campus Värnamo, Teknikcenter, a cinema with three screens, Science Park (a business incubator), Skärteknikcentrum ("Cutting technology centre"), Värnamo Näringsliv and a business centre.

Zivan and Zorka Tomic opened Pizzeria Chaplin in 1979, as the first pizzeria in Värnamo. The interior, furniture and garden are all designed and built by Zivan. In 2004 Tanja Tomic won the European Pizza Championship in Marbella, Spain with her self-composed pizza Santa Lucia.

== Sports ==
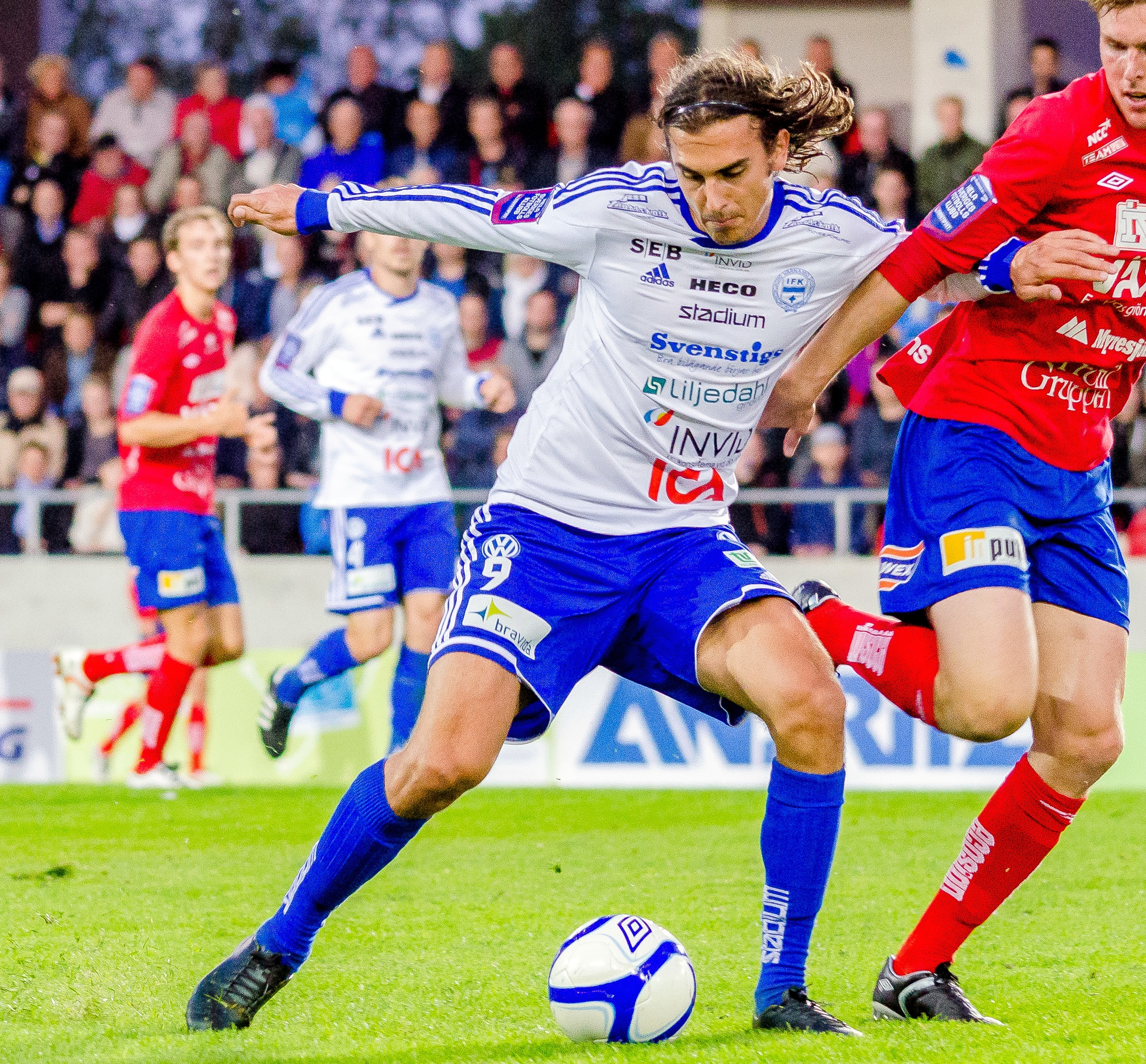
IFK Värnamo playing against Östers IF in Visma Arena in 2012

The football club IFK Värnamo was founded in 1912. Between 2011 and 2018 it played in Superettan, the second tier of Swedish football. It was then relegated, and played in Division 1, the third tier of Swedish football, during 2019 and 2020. The team finished first at the end of the 2020 season, and was promoted to Superettan again. In 2021 Värnamo finished first in Superettan and was promoted to Allsvenskan. The club's home stadium is Finnvedsvallen.

== Infrastructure ==
=== Transport ===
The closest airport, Hagshult Airbase, is located 13 kilometers north of Värnamo. It is operated as a training base by the Swedish Air Force and is also used by Värnamo flying club. The closest public airports are Växjö-Kronoberg Airport (51 km) followed by Jönköping Airport (63 km).

Värnamo is situated on the junction between the Halmstad–Nässjö railway line and the Coast-to-Coast Line (Gothenburg–Kalmar).

City and regional bus traffic is operated by Jönköping County. Värnamo is located just north west of the junction between the European route E4 and the national road 27.

=== Healthcare ===
Värnamo sjukhus is one of three hospitals in Jönköping County and one of the major employers of the town with around 1,300 staff. There is one private and 2 public clinics in Värnamo. These are Apladalens vårdcentral, Vråens vårdcentral and Väster vårdcentral.

== Education ==
There are eight schools for Primary and lower secondary education in Värnamo. These are: Rörstorpsskolan and Mossleskolan and Västhorjaskolan for preschool class to 3rd grade; Enehagens skola for preschool class to 6th grade; Exposkolan and Trälleborgsskolan for 4th to 6th grade and Apladalsskolan and Gröndalsskolan for 7th to 9th grade. The oldest school is Enehagens skola which has been active since 1907 and the newest school is Västhorjaskolan, which opened in 2025.

There was previously a charter school for grades six to nine operated by Prolympia, which focused on sport. It was closed down in 2010 because of a lack of students.

There is one school for upper secondary education called Finnvedens gymnasium. It offers 11 of the 18 national programs, of which in 2020 the most popular were Social Science (23%), Business Management and Economics (16%), Technology (13%), Natural Science (8%), and Vehicle and Transport (8%).

When Finnvedens gymnasium opened in 1969 no students nor any teachers were allowed to participate in the opening ceremony which costed 25,000 SEK (equivalent to US$24,000 in 2020). This was seen as unfair by the student council, who also thought it was too expensive. The student council therefore organized their own, cheaper ceremony outside before the official ceremony. This attracted national news coverage and one of the invitees, Olof Palme, then Minister for Education, who became the Swedish prime minister a month later, spoke to the students.

There is Folk high school in Värnamo called Värnamo Folkhögskola, which has been active since 1876. It is governed by Jönköping County and offers primary, secondary and tertiary education. Among courses offered are youth worker, social educator and courses in textile. It offers boarding and has exchanges with a folk high school in Zambia and one in the UK.

Campus Värnamo offers tertiary level education and is governed by the municipal executive board of Värnamo. It offers technical and engineering courses in 3D computer graphics and printing, polymer engineering and web development as well as courses for paraprofessional educator and preschool teacher. It also runs Teknikcenter ("Technical center"), which organizes technical activities for children and teenagers and educates teachers in technology. Its purpose is to increase interest in technology in the region.

== Media ==
There are three newspapers in Värnamo: Värnamo Nu, Finnveden nu and Värnamo nyheter.

Värnamo Nu is an online-only newspaper that was founded in 2010. It is owned by Birgitta and Per Bunnstad, the latter who is the legally responsible publisher.

Finnveden Nu, founded 2003, is a free newspaper that is distributed every Friday. An online version is also available.

Värnamo Nyheter is an online and print paid newspaper distributed every Monday, Tuesday, Thursday and Saturday. It was founded by Karl Witus Johansson in 1930.

Finnveden Nu and Värnamo Nyheter are owned by Hall Media which is in turn owned by Bonnier News Local and Amedia.

Sveriges Television broadcasts local TV news and publishes online news articles for Jönköping County, which includes Värnamo. Until 2014, local TV news for Jönköping County was also covered by TV4.

Local radio news are covered by Radio Sweden as part of its coverage on Jönköping County. There is also a community radio association, created in 1982, which since 1985 broadcasts music, the assemblies of Värnamo municipal council, news on Israel and Christian worship.

== Notable people ==
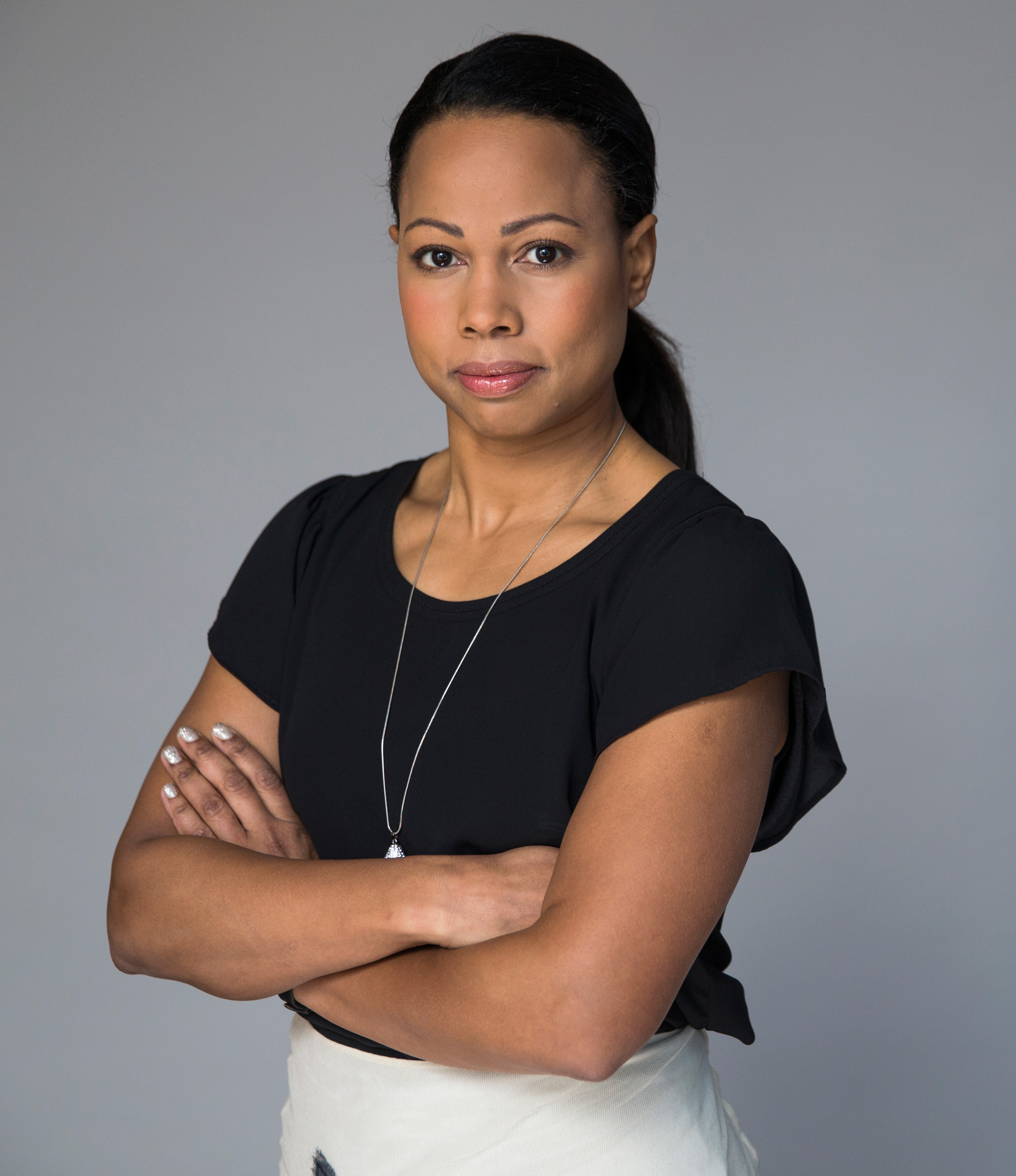
Alice Bah Kuhnke in 2014

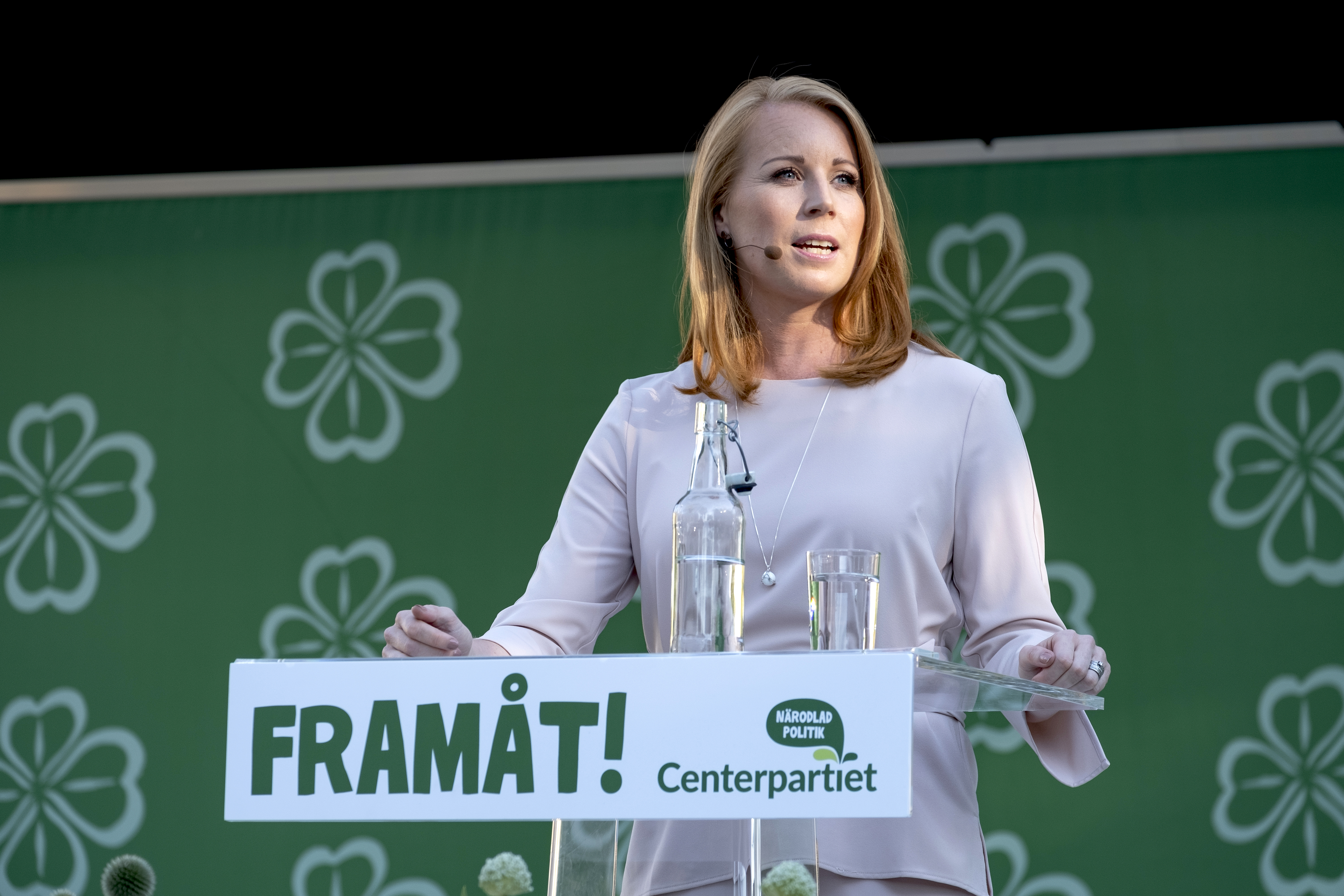
Annie Lööf during the Almedalen Week in 2018

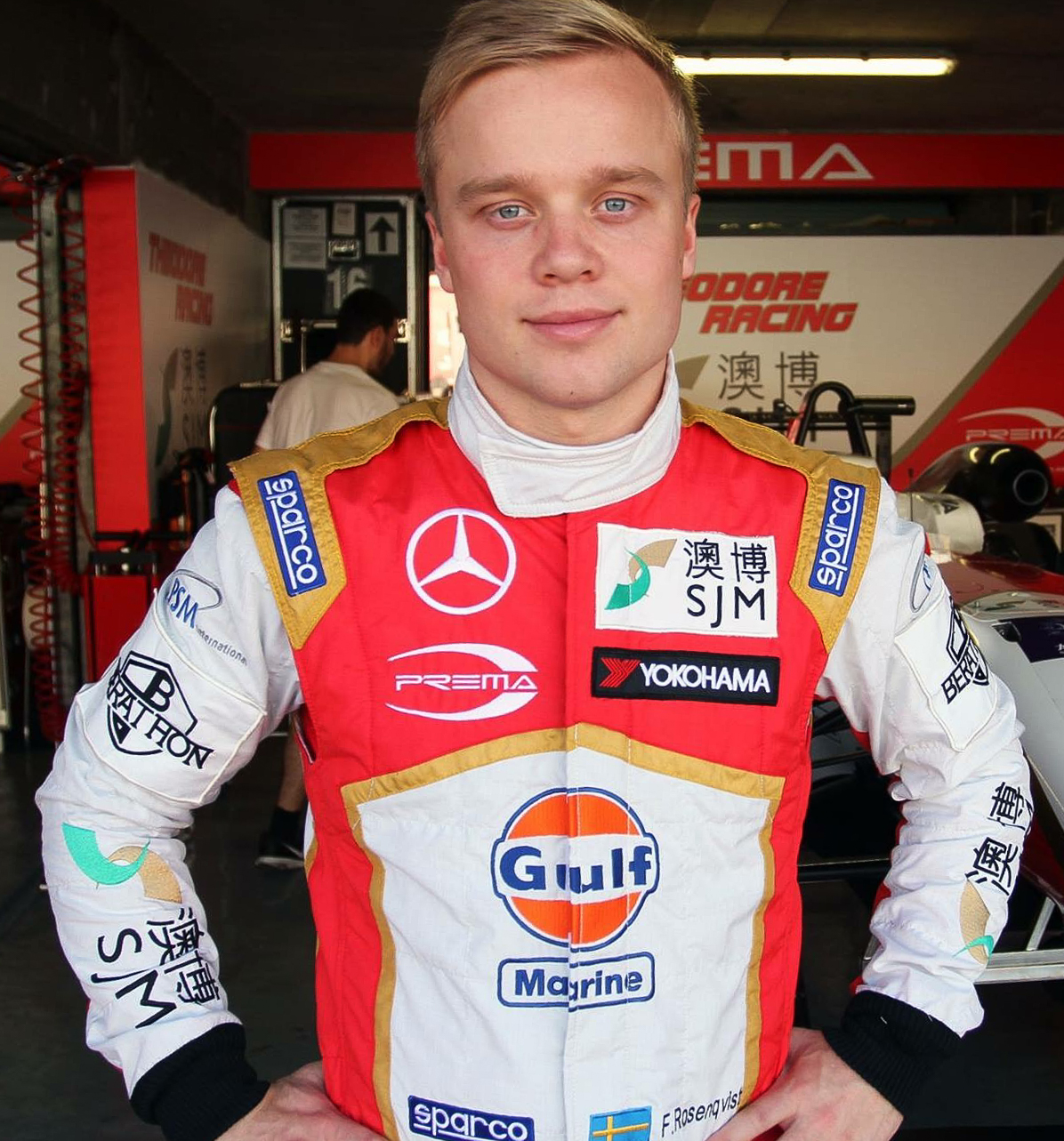
Felix Rosenqvist during the Macau Grand Prix in 2015

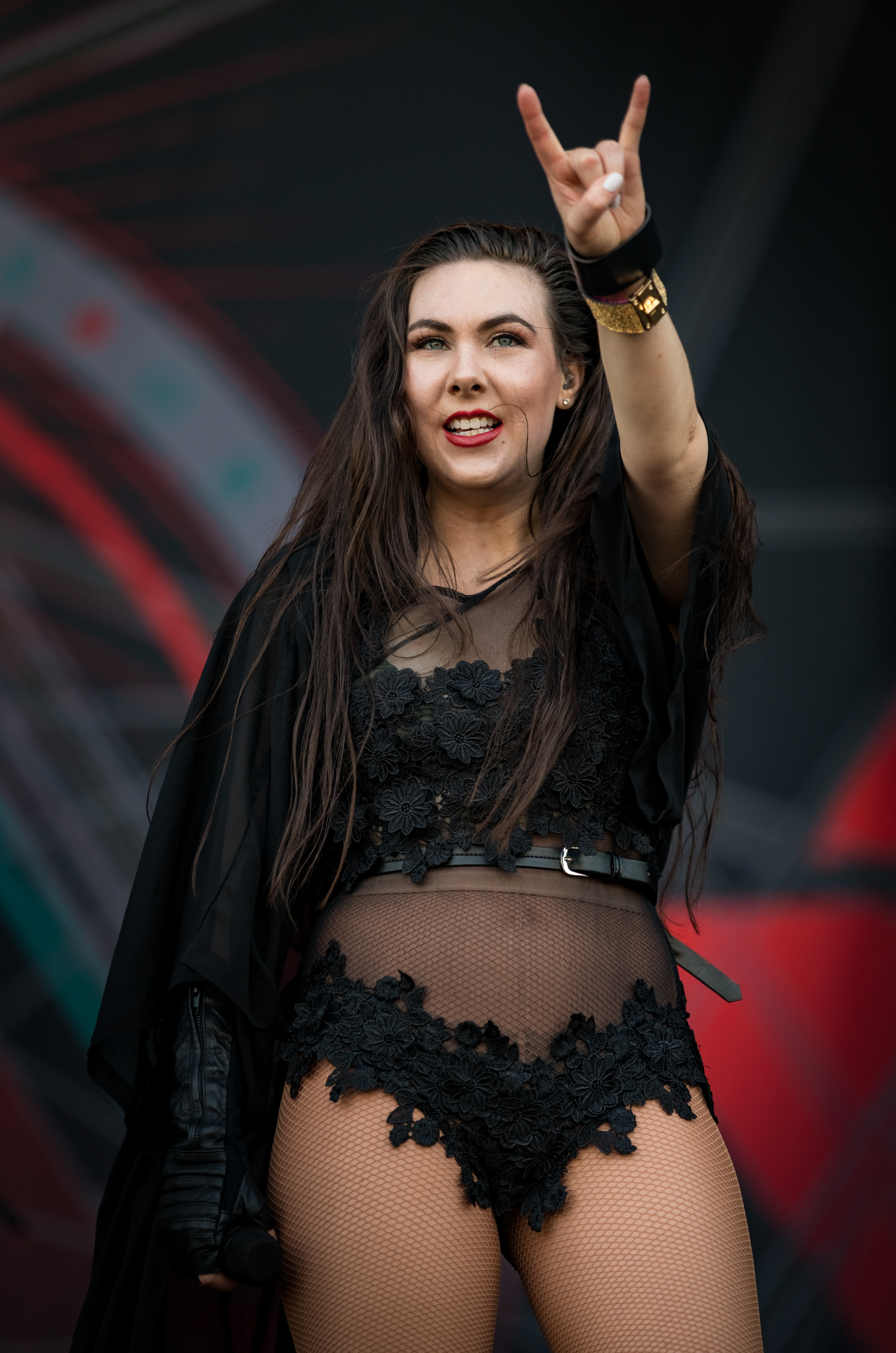
Elize Ryd during Wacken Open Air in 2018
- Anna Anvegård, footballer
- Alice Bah Kuhnke, Member of the European Parliament
- Viktor Claesson, footballer
- Annie Lööf, former leader of the Centre Party
- Bruno Mathsson, furniture designer
- Hanna Ouchterlony, founder of the Swedish Salvation Army
- Felix Rosenqvist, racing driver
- Elize Ryd, singer-songwriter and member of the band Amaranthe
- Jonas Thern, football manager and former professional player
- Stig Sjolin, Boxer
