= Lanna, Värnamo =

Lanna
- Location within Jönköping Location within Sweden
- Coordinates: 57°13′N 13°47′E
- Country: Sweden
- Province: Småland
- County: Jönköping County
- Municipality: Värnamo Municipality and Gnosjö Municipality

Area
  - Total: 0.83 km^{2} (0.32 sq mi)

Population (31 December 2010)
  - Total: 329
  - Density: 396/km^{2} (1,030/sq mi)
- Time zone: UTC+1 (CET)
  - Summer (DST): UTC+2 (CEST)
- Climate: Cfb

Lanna is a bimunicipal locality situated in Värnamo Municipality and Gnosjö Municipality in Jönköping County, Sweden with 329 inhabitants in 2010.
