= Sandahlsbolagen =

Sandahlsbolagen AB
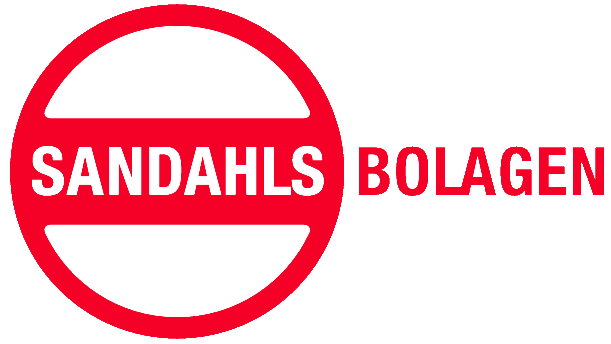
- Company type: Publicly traded Aktiebolag
- Industry: Construction, Transport, Recycling
- Founded: 1951
- Headquarters: Värnamo, Sweden
- Key people: Thord Sandahl (CEO), Ingvar Sandahl (Chairman)
- Revenue: SEK 1 billion (2012)
- Number of employees: 500 (average, 2012)
- Website: www.sandahlsbolagen.se

Sandahlsbolagen is a group of Swedish companies that are associated with transport and construction. The founder was Ingvar Sandahl (born 1927) whose son, Thord Sandahl (born 1956) is currently the CEO.

The company started in 1949 when Ingvar Sandahls Åkeri with a single truck. Since then about twenty companies have been acquired and added to the group.

Sandahlsbolagen has since 1991 been in possession of Bratteborgs gård outside Vaggeryd. The estate is currently occupied by Britta and Ingvar Sandahl. Every second year there is an exhibition here.

In 2012 Sandahlsbolagen formed the company Real Rail AB in collaboration with CargoNet AS which deals with railroad transportation. Thord Sandahl is the CEO.
