= Ohs, Värnamo =

Coordinates: 57°12′N 14°20′E

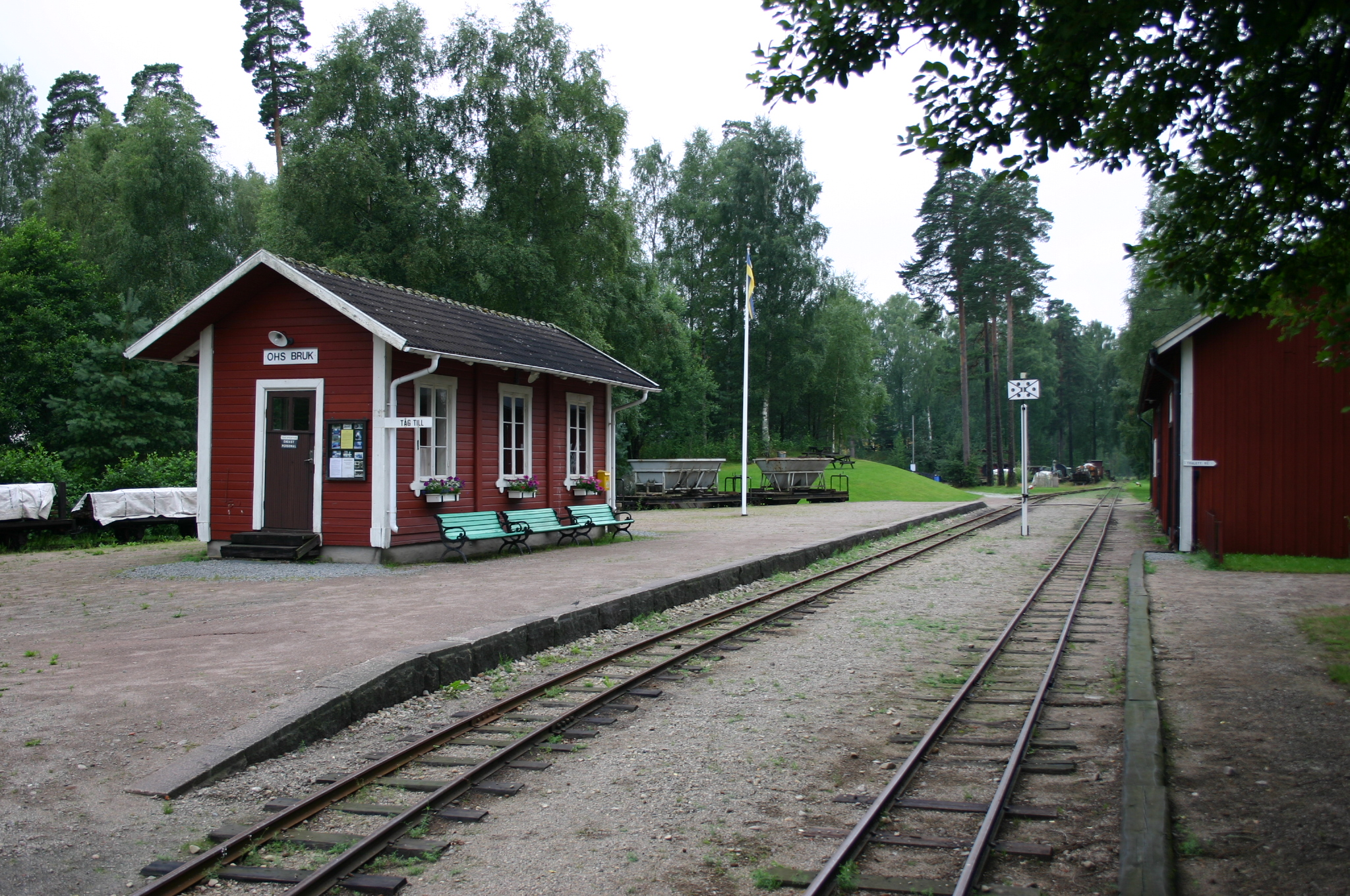
Ohs Bahnhof 31.07.05

Ohs is a small village that is part of the Värnamo Municipality, in the Småland province of southern Sweden.

== Location and history ==
Ohs is situated by the south tip of the lake Rusken, where the historical Nydala Abbey is also situated at the lake-shore. The community is founded around a mill that produced energy for the iron production from 1600. In 1893, it was converted to a paper pulp factory, which operated until 1978. At the old factory site there is now a museum. Since the paper mill closed, the population has shrunk to around 100 people. Many foreigners own former small residential houses in the area for vacation needs.

== Narrow gauge railway ==
Ohs is the starting point of a 600 mm (1 ft 11 5/8 in) narrow gauge Ohsabanan, a museum railway to Bor, 15 km (9.3 mi) away. The railway was constructed in the summer of 1910 and runs steam trains.
