= Horda =

- Location within Jönköping Location within Sweden
- Coordinates: 57°02′N 14°15′E
- Country: Sweden
- Province: Småland
- County: Jönköping County
- Municipality: Värnamo Municipality

Area
  - Total: 0.69 km^{2} (0.27 sq mi)

Population (31 December 2010)
  - Total: 377
  - Density: 549/km^{2} (1,420/sq mi)
- Time zone: UTC+1 (CET)
  - Summer (DST): UTC+2 (CEST)

Horda (Swedish pronunciation: [ˈhôːɖa]) is a locality situated in Värnamo Municipality, Jönköping County, Sweden with 377 inhabitants in 2010.

== Notable people ==
- Alice Bah Kuhnke - Member of the European Parliament
