= Värnamo Municipality =

Municipality in southern Sweden

Värnamo Municipality Värnamo kommun
- Municipality
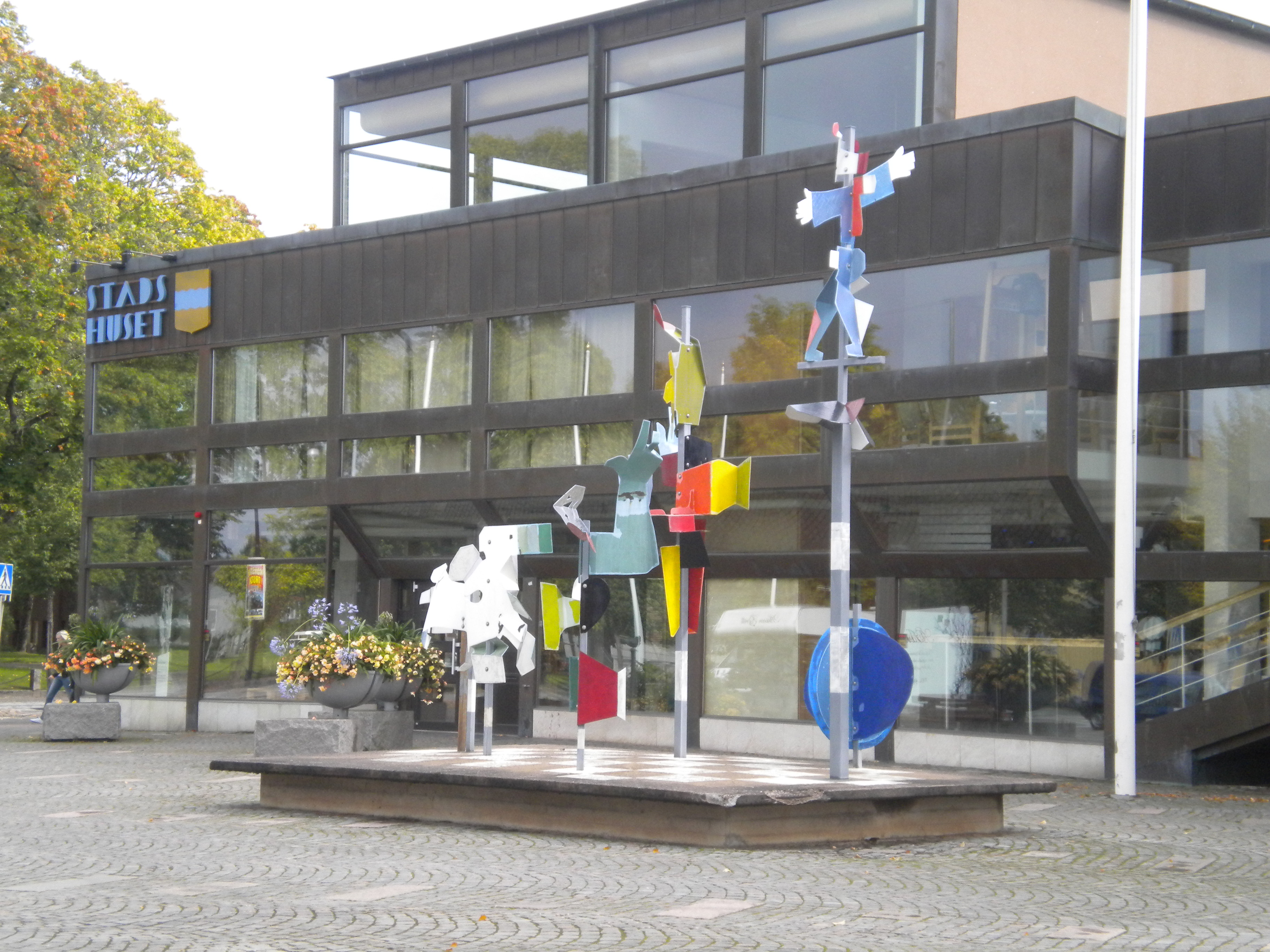
- Town hall

- Coat of arms
- Motto: Den mänskliga tillväxtkommunen (sv)
- Värnamo Municipality in Jönköping County
- Coordinates: 57°11′N 14°02′E
- Country: Sweden
- Province: Småland
- County: Jönköping County
- Established: 1 January 1971
- Seat: Värnamo

Government
  - Type: Municipal council
  - Mayor: Tobias Pettersson (Moderate Party)

Area
  - Total: 1,382.41 km^{2} (533.75 sq mi)
  - Land: 1,216.17 km^{2} (469.57 sq mi)
  - Water: 166.24 km^{2} (64.19 sq mi)

Population (2026-06-30)
  - Total: 34,512
  - Rank: 76th in Sweden
  - Density: 28.378/km^{2} (73.498/sq mi)
- Time zone: UTC+01:00 (CET)
  - Summer (DST): UTC+02:00 (CEST)
- ISO 3166 code: SE
- Municipal code: 0683
- Website: kommun.varnamo.se (in Swedish)

Värnamo Municipality (Swedish: Värnamo kommun) is a municipality in Jönköping County in southern Sweden, where the town Värnamo is seat.

The municipality was created in 1971, when the City of Värnamo (itself instituted in 1920) was amalgamated with the surrounding rural municipalities to form an entity of unitary type. There are fourteen original units making up the present municipality.

== Geography ==
Urban areas in Värnamo municipality
Urban area	Population	Land area (km^{2})	Density (people/km^{2})
Bor	1,304	1.68	776
Bredaryd	1,537	2.21	695
Dannäs	87	0.25	348
Ekenhaga	220	0.20	1,081
Forsheda	1,460	1.70	858
Gällaryd	76	0.30	250
Hjälshammar	92	0.36	260
Horda	363	0.71	515
Hånger	282	0.45	630
Hörle	153	0.38	400
Kärda	333	0.45	745
Lanna	354	1.08	329
Os	58	0.40	140
Rydaholm	1,629	1.73	942
Tånnö	183	0.26	700
Värnamo	19,822	12.14	1,632
Åminne	219	0.38	574

== Demographics ==
This is a demographic table based on Värnamo Municipality's electoral districts in the 2022 Swedish general election sourced from SVT's election platform, in turn taken from SCB official statistics.

In total there were 34,617 inhabitants, including 26,042 Swedish citizens of voting age. 43.6% voted for the left coalition and 55.4% for the right coalition. Indicators are in percentage points except population totals and income.

Location	Residents	Citizen adults	Left vote	Right vote	Employed	Swedish parents	Foreign heritage	Income SEK	Degree
Location			%	%					
Apladalen	1,547	1,187	41.3	57.5	86	75	25	28,183	40
Bor	1,857	1,416	41.4	57.3	87	85	15	27,167	31
Bredaryd	996	734	31.9	66.4	88	83	17	26,819	30
Bredaryd inner	1,510	1,080	37.9	61.0	83	75	25	25,961	23
Forsheda	1,865	1,371	40.0	59.0	85	77	23	26,431	26
Fryele	1,118	885	38.1	61.2	88	88	12	27,989	35
Gröndal	1,775	1,278	43.9	55.3	90	76	24	30,942	48
Horda	1,182	856	36.8	62.4	87	83	17	26,352	30
Hornaryd	1,556	1,193	49.7	49.3	89	69	31	28,709	36
Hånger	1,405	1,065	38.9	60.4	91	91	9	28,623	39
Kärda	760	581	37.4	60.8	87	84	16	27,400	40
Lillegård	1,269	1,056	39.3	59.8	81	74	26	25,401	32
Mossle	1,559	1,002	59.3	39.6	75	47	53	24,564	36
Norregård	1,440	1,088	47.3	51.0	84	69	31	27,163	36
Nylund	1,552	1,210	44.7	55.0	91	80	20	30,008	41
Nöbbele	1,095	871	36.9	61.8	91	91	9	28,995	40
Pilagården	1,694	1,430	46.2	52.7	81	65	35	24,226	32
Rydaholm	2,046	1,405	33.8	65.6	78	70	30	22,708	24
Rörstorp	1,499	1,205	46.2	52.9	87	69	31	26,922	35
Skogsfällan	1,702	1,196	60.3	38.5	79	39	61	23,896	24
Trälleborg	1,793	1,326	47.5	50.4	78	55	45	24,419	33
Vråen	1,549	1,199	57.2	41.8	78	62	38	22,740	26
Västhorja	1,848	1,408	43.4	56.2	91	85	15	31,337	45
Source: SVT

== Governance ==
Värnamo municipal council after the 2022 elections

Party	Seats	Percent
Social Democrats	14	26.8%
Moderates	11	20.6%
Sweden Democrats	9	16.7%
Centre Party	8	16.4%
Christian Democrats	5	10.3%
Liberals	2	3.0%
Left Party	2	4.0%
Green Party	0	1.9%
Other	0	0.2%

Värnamo Municipality has been governed by the Moderate Party, the Centre Party and the Christian Democrats since at least 1994, with the addition of the Liberals in 2002 and the Green Party 2014–2018. The Social Democratic Party has been the largest party every year since the formation of the municipality, with an average of 34 percent of the votes. The Centre Party (of which the then national leader, Annie Lööf, is from Värnamo) and the Christian Democrats were unusually strong, and received more than twice as many votes as the national average in the 2018 elections.
