= Rydaholm =

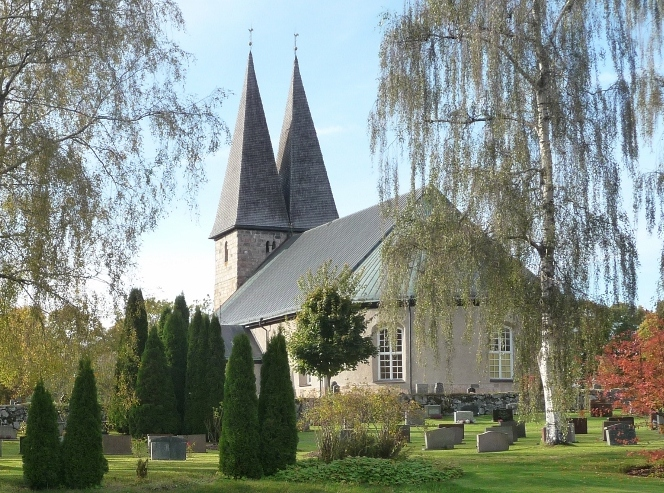
- Rydaholm church.

- Location within Jönköping Location within Sweden
- Coordinates: 56°59′N 14°18′E
- Country: Sweden
- Province: Småland
- County: Jönköping County
- Municipality: Värnamo Municipality

Area
  - Total: 1.49 km^{2} (0.58 sq mi)

Population (31 December 2010)
  - Total: 1,474
  - Density: 989/km^{2} (2,560/sq mi)
- Time zone: UTC+1 (CET)
  - Summer (DST): UTC+2 (CEST)

Rydaholm is a locality situated in Värnamo Municipality, Jönköping County, Sweden with 1,474 inhabitants in 2010.
