= Malin Östh =

Swedish politician (born 1972)

Member of the Riksdag
- Incumbent
- Assumed office 9 September 2024
- Preceded by: Linda Westerlund Snecker
- Constituency: Östergötland County

Personal details
- Born: 25 April 1972 (age 54) Gistad, Sweden
- Party: Left Party

Malin Kristina Östh (born 25 April 1972) is a Swedish politician and Member of the Riksdag. A member of the Left Party, she has represented Östergötland County since September 2024.

Östh was born on 25 April 1972 in Gistad, Linköping Municipality. She grew up in Gistad but has lived in Söderköping Municipality since the early 2000s. She has a bachelor’s degree in environmental science and is a qualified assistant nurse. She has worked in psychiatric care, at an addiction clinic, with unaccompanied refugee children and at the Swedish Public Employment Service. She has been working as the Left Party's political secretary in Region Östergötland since 2019. She has also worked in a women's shelter and volunteered at a fair trade shop in Norrköping. She was a board member of the Swedish Society for Nature Conservation for ten years.

Östh has been a member of the municipal council in Söderköping since 2014 and is also a member of Region Östergötland, the regional council in Östergötland County. She was appointed to the Riksdag in September 2024 following the resignation of Linda Westerlund Snecker.

Östh lives in Kåknö Norrgård near Östra Ryd with her partner Jerker Andersson. She is a vegetarian.

Electoral history of Malin Östh
Election	Constituency	Party	List no.	Votes	%	Result
2014 general	Östergötland County	Left Party	8	118	0.84%	Not elected
2014 local	Region Östergötland - Linköping	Left Party	2			Elected - party mandate
2014 local	Söderköping Municipality	Left Party	1			Elected - party mandate
2018 general	Östergötland County	Left Party	6	91	0.45%	Not elected
2018 local	Region Östergötland - Norrköping	Left Party	2	112	1.31%	Elected - party mandate
2018 local	Söderköping Municipality	Left Party	1			Elected - personal mandate
2022 general	Östergötland County	Left Party	2	194	1.15%	Not elected
2022 local	Region Östergötland - Ödeshög Ydre Boxholm Mjölby Vadstena	Left Party	4	6	0.30%	Elected - party mandate
2022 local	Söderköping Municipality	Left Party	1	50	8.35%	Elected - personal mandate
2026 general	Östergötland County	Left Party	1	1,090	4.96%	Elected - party mandate
2026 local	Söderköping Municipality	Left Party	2	18	4.79%	Not elected
