= Svartån (Östergötland) =

River in Östergötland, Sweden

Coordinates: 58.4663°N 15.5500°E

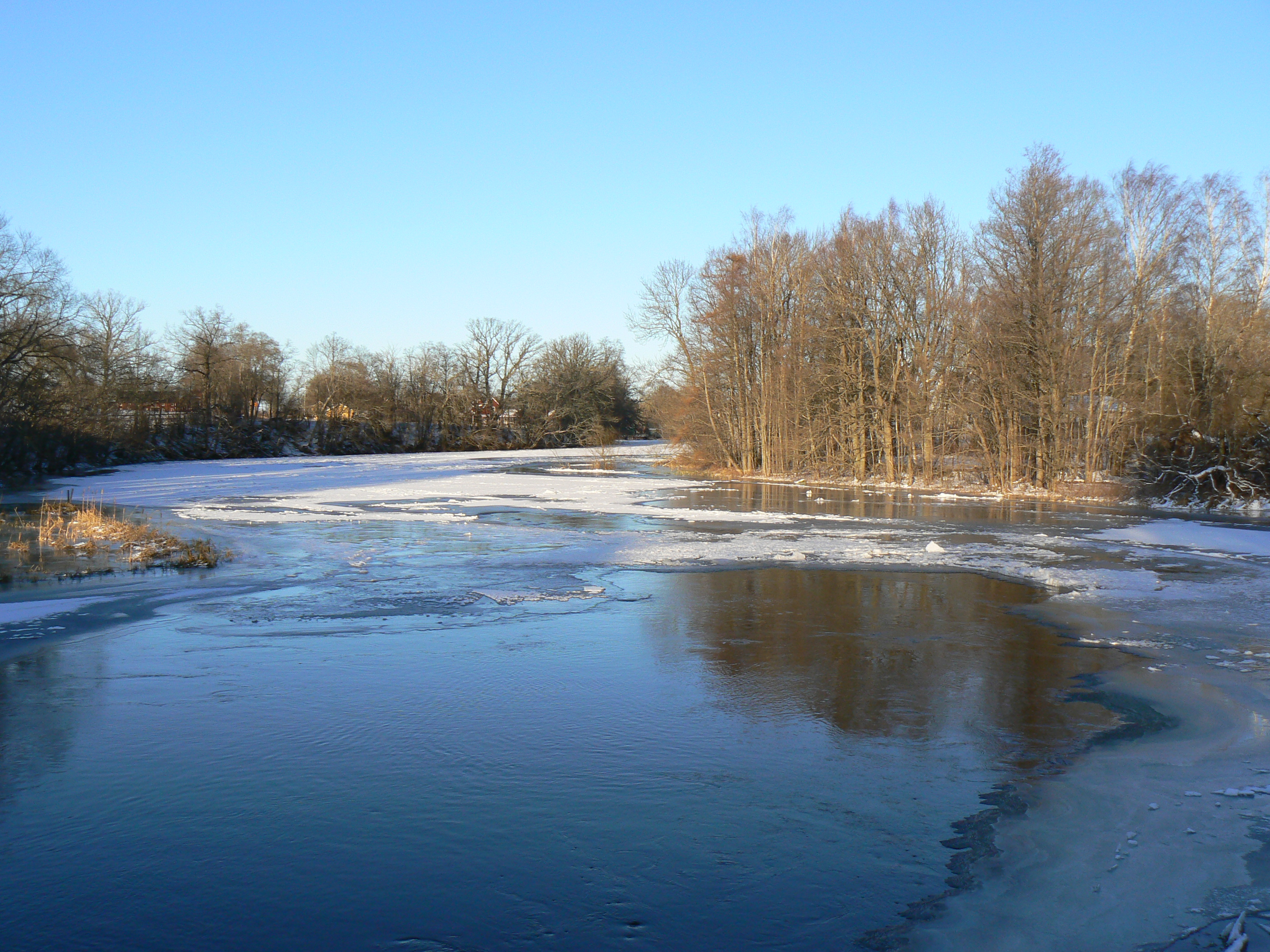
Svartån at Ledberg, Linköping Municipality.

The Svartån is a river in eastern Sweden and the largest tributary to Motala ström. The river has a total length of 165 kilometers and a drainage basin area of 3410 km². Its source is situated close to Ormaryd in Jönköping County, about 10 kilometers east of the town of Nässjö, and the river initially flows north through Aneby, forming the Stalpet waterfall. From Aneby it continues through Gripenberg and the town of Tranås before entering lake Sommen. From Sommen it continues through Boxholm, Strålsnäs, Mjölby and Sya before entering the Östergötland plain. The mouth of the river is at lake Roxen, where it enters Motala ström.
