= Region Östergötland =

Regional council of Östergötland County, Sweden

Coordinates: 58°24′22″N 15°37′36″E

- Regional Council
- Formation: 2015
- County: Östergötland County
- Country: Sweden
- Website: www.regionostergotland.se

Legislative branch
- Legislature: Regional Council
- Assembly members: 101

Executive branch
- Chairman of the Regional Executive Board: Marie Morell
- First Deputy Chairman: Andreas Westöö
- Second Deputy Chairman: Kaisa Karro
- Headquarters: Linköping

Region Östergötland, formerly known as Östergötland County Council (Swedish: Östergötlands läns landsting), is the regional council for Östergötland County, Sweden. It is responsible for healthcare, public transport, regional development, and culture.

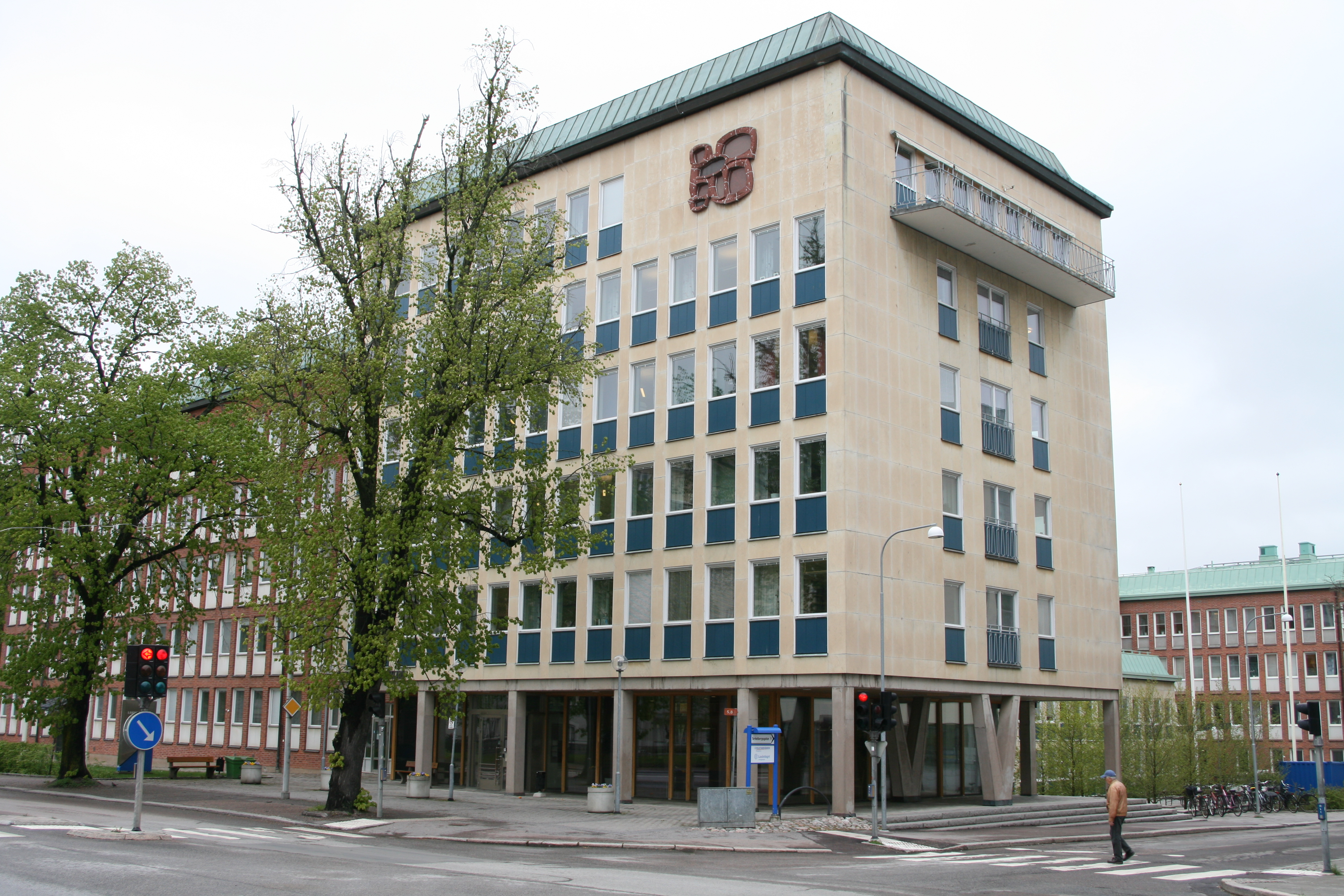
Landstingshuset, Sankt Larsgatan, Linköping, designed by architect Herbert Brunskog.

== History ==
The Swedish County Councils were established in 1863. In 1963, Östergötland County Council published a centennial history written by Robert Myrdal, including a portrait gallery of elected representatives. On 1 January 2015, Östergötland County Council was restructured into Region Östergötland.

== Responsibilities ==
=== Hospitals ===
- Linköping University Hospital
- Vrinnevi Hospital, Norrköping
- Motala Hospital

=== Public Transport ===
Region Östergötland serves as the regional public transport authority, with its subsidiary Östgötatrafiken managing transport operations.

=== Culture ===
- Östergötland County Museum – responsible for cultural heritage and museum activities

== Politics ==
The current mandate period runs from 15 October 2022 to 14 October 2026. The Regional Council consists of eight political parties. Moderates, Christian Democrats, and Liberals govern with support from the Sweden Democrats, while the opposition includes the Social Democrats, Centre Party, Left Party, and Green Party.

=== Regional Council Leadership 2022–2026 ===
- Nils Babtist (L) – Chairman of the Regional Council
- Elvira Wibeck (KD) – First Deputy Chairman
- Rebecca Hägg (S) – Second Deputy Chairman

=== Regional Executive Board Leadership 2022–2026 ===
- Marie Morell (M) – Chairman
- Andreas Westöö (L) – First Deputy Chairman
- Kaisa Karro (S) – Second Deputy Chairman

=== Electoral Districts ===
Region Östergötland is divided into five electoral districts:

- First district: Linköping Municipality
- Second district: Norrköping Municipality
- Third district: Söderköping, Valdemarsvik, Åtvidaberg, Kinda
- Fourth district: Mjölby, Vadstena, Ödeshög, Boxholm, Ydre
- Fifth district: Motala, Finspång

== Past Chairpersons of the County Council ==
- 1863 - Gustaf af Ugglas
- 1864-1870 - Fredrik Alexander Funck
- 1871 - Johan Gustaf Swartz
- 1873-1878 - Carl Edvard Ekman
- 1879 - Robert De la Gardie
- 1880-1886 - Carl Edvard Ekman
- 1887-1893 - Robert De la Gardie
- 1894-1897 - John Örwall
- 1898-1912 - Niklas Fosser
- 1913-1918 - Philip Klingspor
- 1919-1927 - Theodor Adelswärd
- 1928-1938 - David Pettersson
- 1939-1946 - Erik Josef Ericsson
- 1947-1951 - Gottfrid Karlsson
- 1952-1984 - Fridolf Thapper
- (1995, 1998) - Bo Pettersson
- (2001, 2004) - Paul Håkansson
- (2009) - Marie Morell
- (2018) - Kaisa Karro
- (2022) - Marie Morell
