= Bankekind =

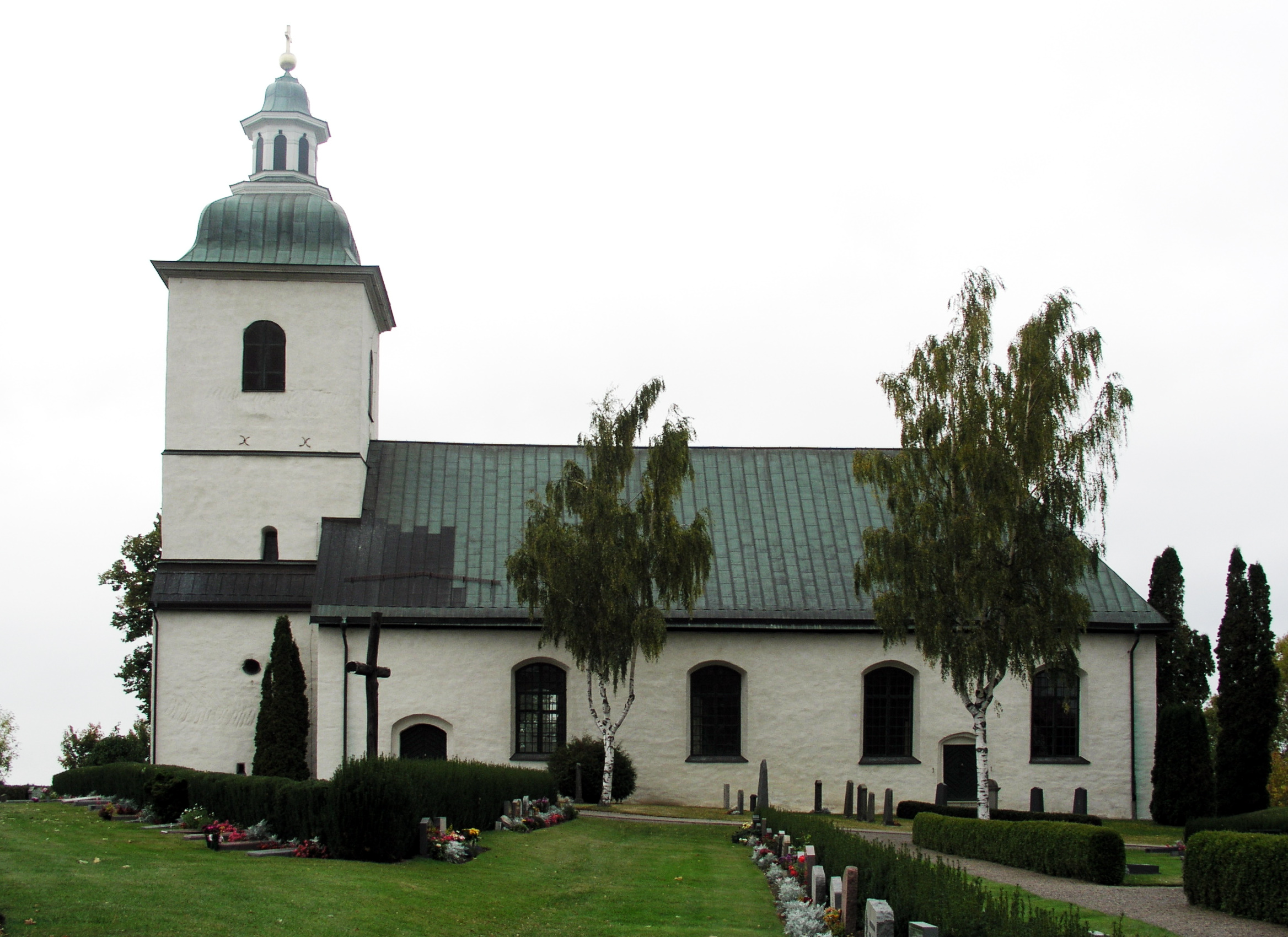
- Bankekind Church

- Location within Östergötland Location within Sweden
- Coordinates: 58°22′N 15°49′E
- Country: Sweden
- Province: Östergötland
- County: Östergötland County
- Municipality: Linköping Municipality

Area
  - Total: 0.30 km^{2} (0.12 sq mi)

Population (31 December 2010)
  - Total: 405
  - Density: 1,360/km^{2} (3,500/sq mi)
- Time zone: UTC+1 (CET)
  - Summer (DST): UTC+2 (CEST)
- Climate: Cfb

Bankekind is a locality situated in Linköping Municipality, Östergötland County, Sweden with 405 inhabitants in 2010. Bankekind was earlier called Svinstad (ENG: Pigtown) but changed its name because of the pejorative connotations. It is known for its 13th-century church and the lake Svinstadsjön. It is primarily a commuter village but had its own nursery/ pre-school, primary school (school years, 0-3) and supported housing residence for the elderly.

Bankekinds härad (Bankekind Hundred) was a hundred of Östergötland in Sweden.
