= Flag of Östergötland =

Unofficial provincial flag in Sweden

Flag of Östergötland

The flag of Östergötland is an unofficial provincial flag in Sweden which was created by Per Andersson from Mjölby in 1972. Back then, the flag was a part of a tourist project called "Vätterlandet", and was first supposed to represent the entire region of Götaland. Its purpose was to attract more visitors to the Lake Vättern region, but the project failed and the flag was more or less forgotten. However, the flag has started to get some attention, and is more and more used by local inhabitants in Östergötland.

The flag has the same proportions as the Swedish flag, but with reversed colours; Blue cross on a yellow field. The cross represents Göta Canal and Kinda Canal, the province's two principal waterways. The yellow field represents the central plains of the province. The flag also has a great similarity to a proposed flag for Åland, which was rejected by the municipality who thought it was too ugly.
