= Svartån (disambiguation) =

Svartån is the name of several rivers and streams in Sweden and Finland.

== Sweden ==
- Svartån, Västmanland, river in Västmanland which flows through Skultuna and Västerås to lake Mälaren.
- Svartån, Östergötland, river in Småland and Östergötland which flows from Aneby through Tranås, lake Sommen and Mjölby to lake Roxen, where it joins Motala ström.
- Svartån, Närke, river in Närke which flows through Örebro to lake Hjälmaren.
- Svartån, Skåne, river in Skåne which flows from lake Krageholmssjön to the Baltic Sea at Svarte.
- Svartån, Halland, river in Halland and a tributary to Högvadsån.
- In Värmland there are two streams named Svartån:
  - Svartån (Grässjön) from lake Bosjön near Filipstad to Grässjön south of Hagfors
  - Svartån (Ölman), a 20 km long tributary to Ölman in the southern part of the province.
- In Gästrikland and Hälsingland there are four different streams named Svartån.

== Finland ==
- Svartån is the Swedish name of a stream in Nyland/Uusimaa in Finland. Its Finnish name is Karjaanjoki.
