= Rappestad =

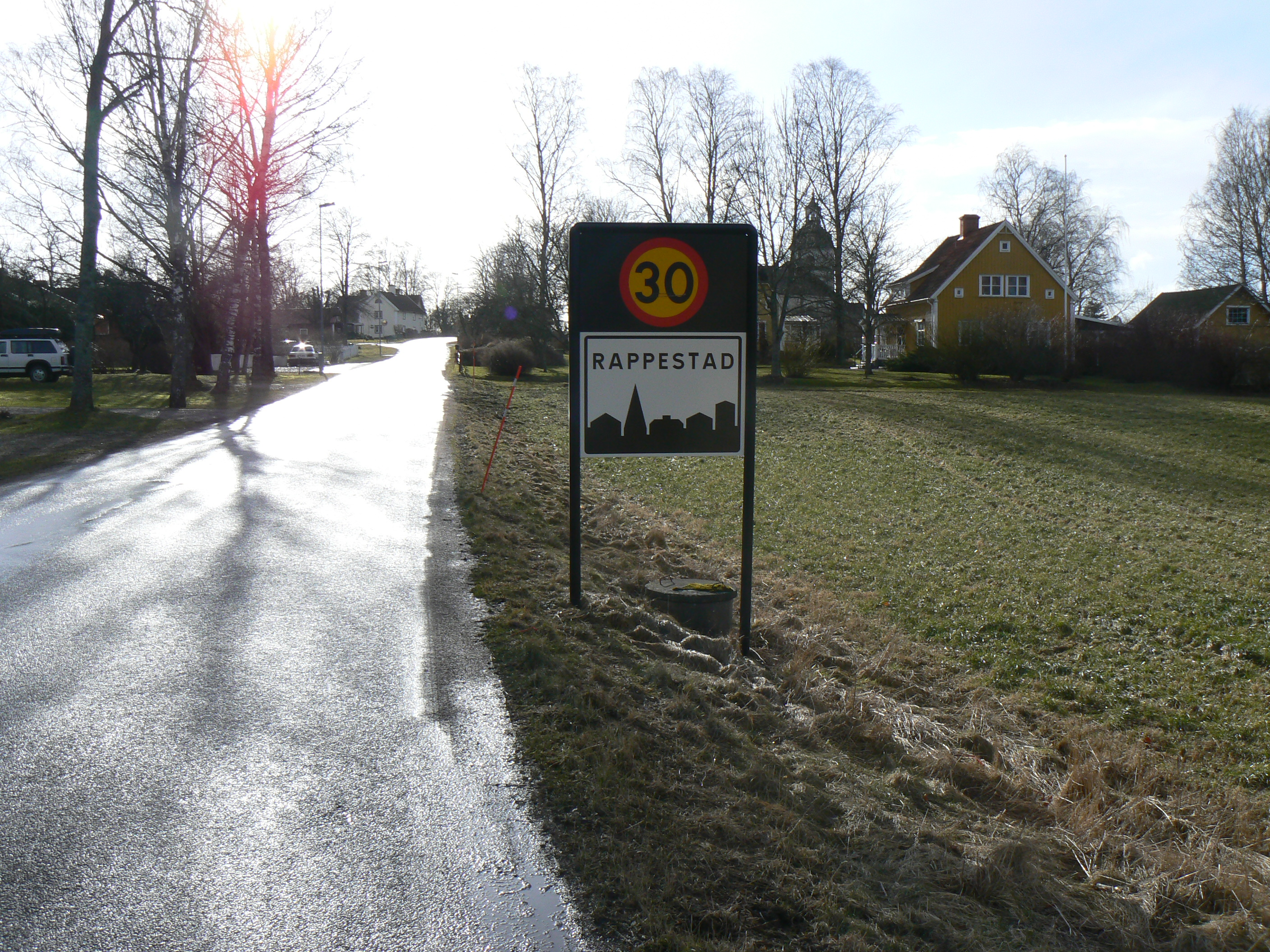

- Location within Östergötland Location within Sweden
- Coordinates: 58°24′N 15°25′E
- Country: Sweden
- Province: Östergötland
- County: Östergötland County
- Municipality: Linköping Municipality

Area
  - Total: 0.33 km^{2} (0.13 sq mi)

Population (31 December 2010)
  - Total: 235
  - Density: 717/km^{2} (1,860/sq mi)
- Time zone: UTC+1 (CET)
  - Summer (DST): UTC+2 (CEST)

Rappestad is a locality situated in Linköping Municipality, Östergötland County, Sweden with 235 inhabitants in 2010.
