= Ekängen =

- Location within Östergötland Location within Sweden
- Coordinates: 58°28′N 15°38′E
- Country: Sweden
- Province: Östergötland
- County: Östergötland County
- Municipality: Linköping Municipality

Area
  - Total: 1.39 km^{2} (0.54 sq mi)

Population (31 December 2020)
  - Total: 2,698
  - Density: 1,940/km^{2} (5,030/sq mi)
- Time zone: UTC+1 (CET)
  - Summer (DST): UTC+2 (CEST)

Ekängen is a locality situated in Linköping Municipality, Östergötland County, Sweden with 2,037 inhabitants in 2010.
