= Veta Östergård =

Coordinates: 58.35583°N 15.26142°E

Veta Östergård is located in the village of Veta kyrkby, a few kilometers from the village of Mantorp in Sweden.

== See also ==
- Mjölby Municipality
