= Hogstad =

- Location within Östergötland Location within Sweden
- Coordinates: 58°20′N 15°01′E
- Country: Sweden
- Province: Östergötland
- County: Östergötland County
- Municipality: Mjölby Municipality

Area
  - Total: 0.42 km^{2} (0.16 sq mi)

Population (31 December 2010)
  - Total: 241
  - Density: 576/km^{2} (1,490/sq mi)
- Time zone: UTC+1 (CET)
  - Summer (DST): UTC+2 (CEST)

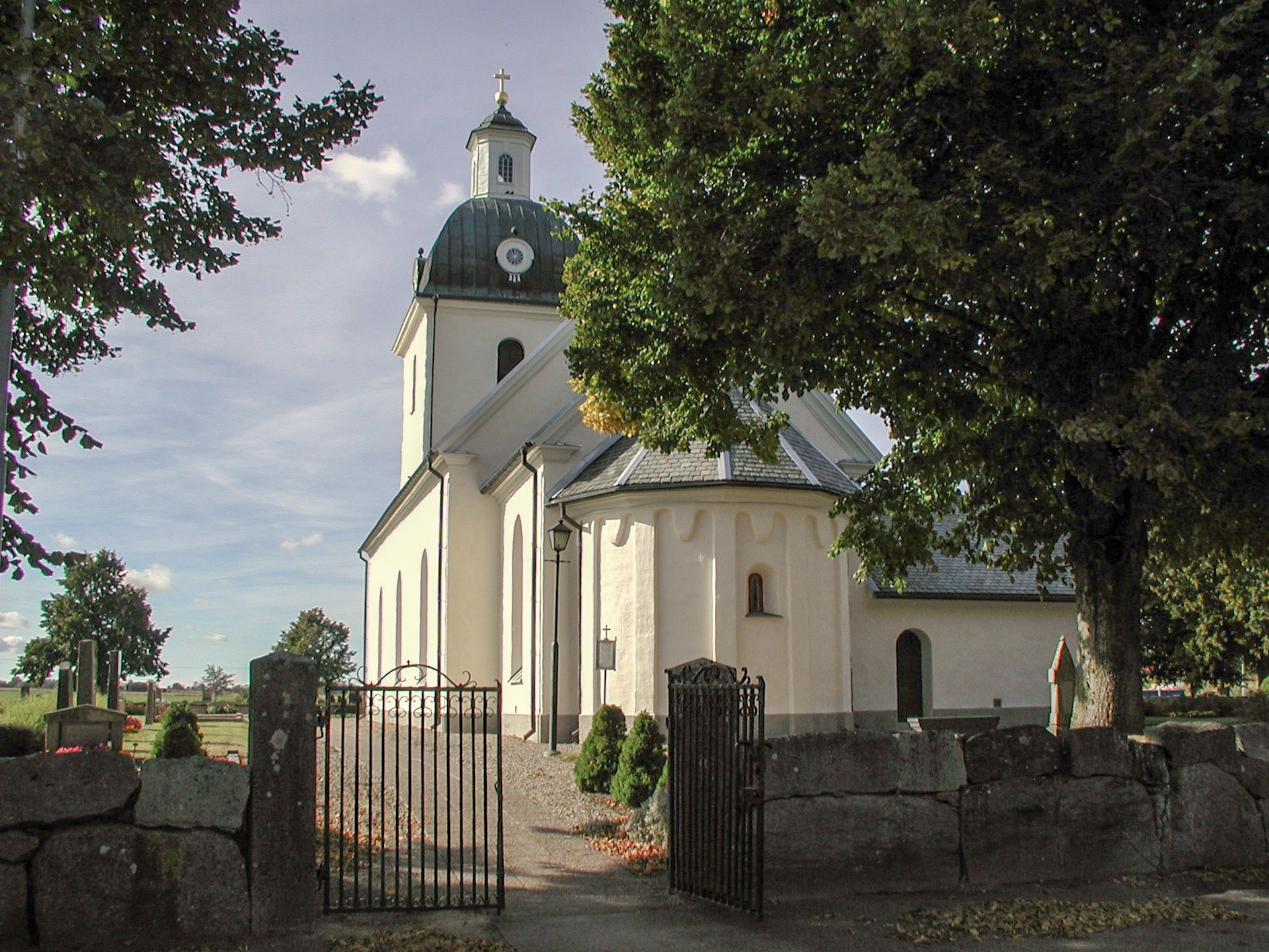
Hogstad church

Hogstad (Swedish pronunciation: [ˈhɔ̂kːsta]) is a locality situated in Mjölby Municipality, Östergötland County, Sweden with 241 inhabitants in 2010.
