= Emy Fick =

Swedish textile artist, educator and fashion designer (1876–1959)

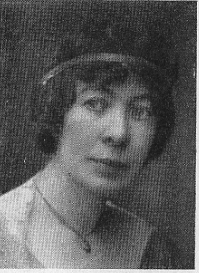
Emy Fick (1910)

Emy Oscaria Charlotte Fick née Kylander (1876–1959) was a Swedish textile artist, educator and fashion designer. After completing her education with study trips to Italy, France and Germany, she returned to Stockholm where she worked with textiles in the Nordiska Kompaniet department store. While there, she met Elisabeth Glantzberg with whom in 1910 she established Birgittaskolan which not only offered courses but served as a fashion studio where textiles could be ordered. After breaking up with Glantzberg in 1914, Fick set up her own business which she called Santa Birgittaskolan. From the late 1920s, the company became recognized for its tapestries. After closing the establishment in the mid-1930s, Fick moved to Östergötland with her large collection of lace, clothes and furniture which she left to Östergötland Museum.

== Biography ==
Born on 14 December 1876 in Stockholm, Emy Oscaria Charlotte Kylander was the eldest child of the merchant Paul Oscar Kylander and Edla Leontina Charlotta Kylander née Levin who was of noble birth. In 1921, she married the cavalry officer Emil Fredrik Fick who also competed in fencing at the Olympics. After studying at the Friends of Handicraft establishment around 1900, she embarked on study trips to Bologna, Florence and Rome after which she travelled to France and Germany to study tapestry. She also spent a year in Paris at the Worth fashion house.

While working with textiles in Stockholm's Nordiska Kompaniet department store, she met Elisabeth Glantzberg who had recently returned from the United States where she had run a textile establishment in Boston. In 1910, they jointly established Birgittaskolan or the Birgitta School in central Stockholm. Offering courses in sewing, embroidery and lace, the firm also satisfied orders for underwear, decorative textiles and rugs.

Apparently as a result of their varying backgrounds, Glantzberg, who encouraged women to learn textile arts so that they could work professionally, broke up with Fick, whose training was directed towards women keen to produce textiles at home. They split the business into two separate firms. Glantzberg kept the name Birgittaskolan while Fick called hers Sankta Birgittaskolan or Saint Birgitta School. Fick stressed that the clothes she produced were handsewn handicrafts designed for the upper class.

During the late 1920s and early 1930s, Sankta Birgittaskolan created a number of significant decorative tapestries. In particular, in collaboration with Ossian Elgström, she created Leif Eriksson upptäcker Vinland (Leif Eriksson discovers Vinland) which was exhibited at the 1933 Chicago World Fair. Fick exhibited her embroidery, woven images and household textiles at various international exhibitions. In 1925, she won both a gold and a bronze medal at the International Exhibition of Modern Decorative and Industrial Arts in Paris.

Emy Fick closed Sankta Birgittaskolan in the mid-1930s. She spent her remaining years in the manor at Strålsnäs in Östergötland. She died there on 19 November 1959, leaving her large collection of lace, clothes and furniture to Östergötland Museum.
