= Horn, Sweden =

Horn
- Location within Östergötland Location within Sweden
- Coordinates: 57°54′N 15°50′E
- Country: Sweden
- Province: Östergötland
- County: Östergötland County
- Municipality: Kinda Municipality

Area
  - Total: 0.79 km^{2} (0.31 sq mi)

Population (31 December 2010)
  - Total: 495
  - Density: 623/km^{2} (1,610/sq mi)
- Time zone: UTC+1 (CET)
  - Summer (DST): UTC+2 (CEST)
- Climate: Dfb

Horn is a locality situated in Kinda Municipality, Östergötland County, Sweden with 495 inhabitants in 2010.

== Climate ==
Horn has a hybrid climate between continental and maritime tendencies. It is influenced by its interior position in a spot prone to air frosts and high diurnal temperature variation. As a result, frosts are possible in all months of the year, even though monthly average highs are above freezing year-round. Horn has not had its station operating longer than 1995, although has since been established as the coldest climate with a weather station in the wider Southern Sweden region of Götaland.

Climate data for Horn (2002–2018 averages, extremes since 1995)
Month	Jan	Feb	Mar	Apr	May	Jun	Jul	Aug	Sep	Oct	Nov	Dec	Year
Record high °C (°F)	11.3 (52.3)	12.8 (55.0)	20.3 (68.5)	26.3 (79.3)	28.8 (83.8)	31.0 (87.8)	36.3 (97.3)	33.5 (92.3)	29.6 (85.3)	23.0 (73.4)	14.6 (58.3)	12.7 (54.9)	36.3 (97.3)
Mean maximum °C (°F)	7.4 (45.3)	7.6 (45.7)	14.3 (57.7)	20.1 (68.2)	25.0 (77.0)	27.9 (82.2)	29.0 (84.2)	28.1 (82.6)	23.4 (74.1)	17.2 (63.0)	12.6 (54.7)	8.5 (47.3)	30.2 (86.4)
Mean daily maximum °C (°F)	0.7 (33.3)	1.5 (34.7)	5.8 (42.4)	12.1 (53.8)	17.4 (63.3)	20.9 (69.6)	23.2 (73.8)	21.8 (71.2)	17.7 (63.9)	10.8 (51.4)	6.2 (43.2)	2.6 (36.7)	11.7 (53.1)
Daily mean °C (°F)	−2.8 (27.0)	−2.5 (27.5)	0.5 (32.9)	5.6 (42.1)	10.4 (50.7)	14.0 (57.2)	16.6 (61.9)	15.6 (60.1)	11.8 (53.2)	6.5 (43.7)	3.0 (37.4)	−0.6 (30.9)	6.5 (43.7)
Mean daily minimum °C (°F)	−6.2 (20.8)	−6.4 (20.5)	−4.8 (23.4)	−0.9 (30.4)	3.3 (37.9)	7.1 (44.8)	10.0 (50.0)	9.3 (48.7)	5.9 (42.6)	2.1 (35.8)	−0.3 (31.5)	−3.8 (25.2)	1.3 (34.3)
Mean minimum °C (°F)	−21.2 (−6.2)	−19.0 (−2.2)	−15.0 (5.0)	−8.0 (17.6)	−3.9 (25.0)	0.4 (32.7)	3.7 (38.7)	2.0 (35.6)	−1.9 (28.6)	−6.5 (20.3)	−10.1 (13.8)	−15.6 (3.9)	−24.7 (−12.5)
Record low °C (°F)	−31.6 (−24.9)	−34.2 (−29.6)	−29.3 (−20.7)	−14.3 (6.3)	−6.8 (19.8)	−2.0 (28.4)	0.0 (32.0)	−2.3 (27.9)	−6.2 (20.8)	−13.1 (8.4)	−17.5 (0.5)	−30.0 (−22.0)	−34.2 (−29.6)
Average precipitation mm (inches)	34.8 (1.37)	26.8 (1.06)	23.1 (0.91)	28.4 (1.12)	47.3 (1.86)	70.5 (2.78)	76.3 (3.00)	79.9 (3.15)	37.3 (1.47)	53.0 (2.09)	45.7 (1.80)	37.5 (1.48)	560.6 (22.09)
Source 1: SMHI Open Data for Horn A, precipitation
Source 2: SMHI Open Data for Horn A, temperature
