= Rimforsa =

Locality in Östergötland, Sweden

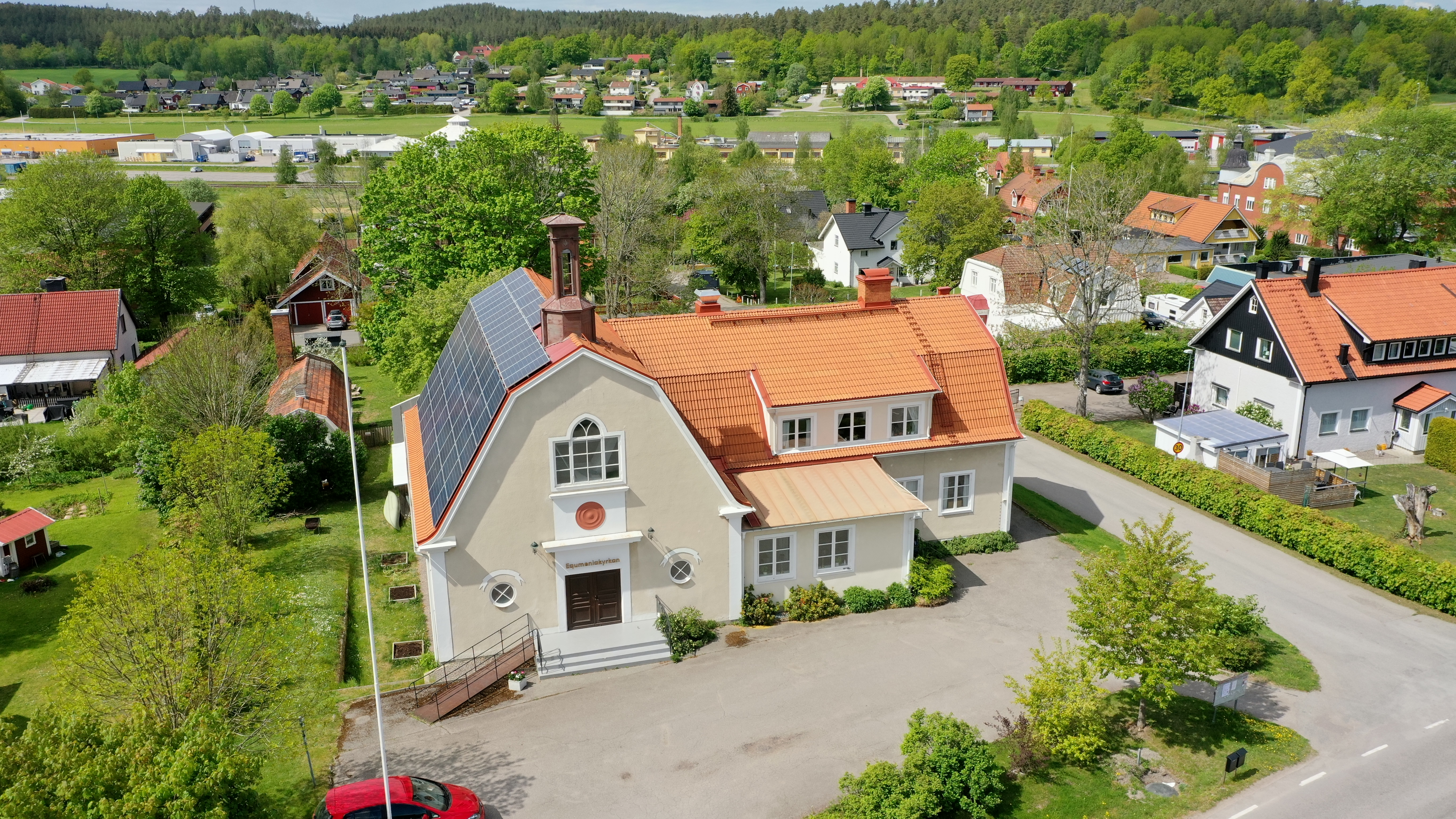
- Rimforsa

- Location within Östergötland Location within Sweden
- Coordinates: 58°08′N 15°40′E
- Country: Sweden
- Province: Östergötland
- County: Östergötland County
- Municipality: Kinda Municipality

Area
  - Total: 2.13 km^{2} (0.82 sq mi)

Population (31 December 2020)
  - Total: 2,317
  - Density: 1,090/km^{2} (2,820/sq mi)
- Time zone: UTC+1 (CET)
  - Summer (DST): UTC+2 (CEST)
- Climate: Cfb

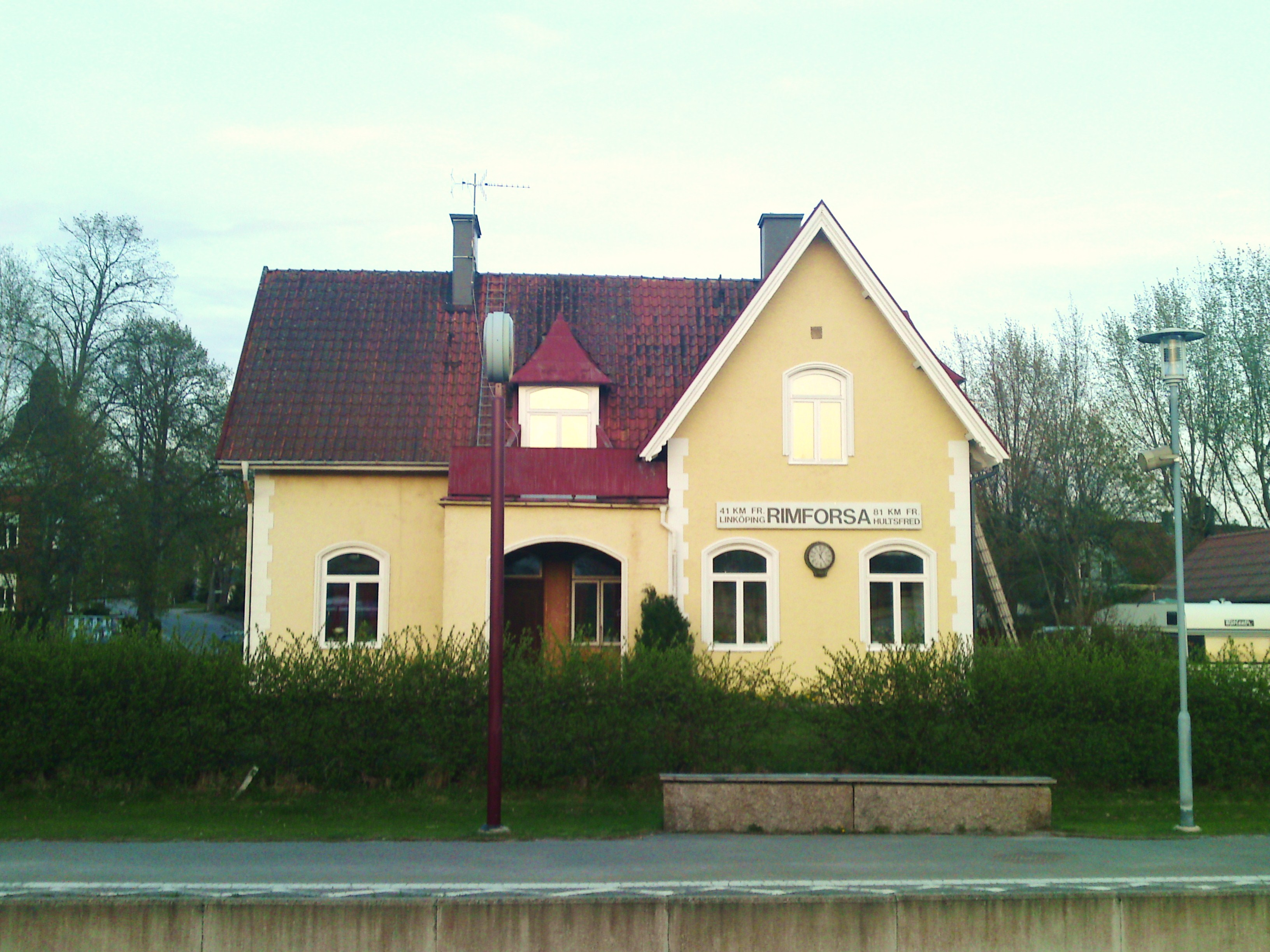

Rimforsa is a locality situated in Kinda Municipality, Östergötland County, Sweden with 2,238 inhabitants in 2010.

It is surrounded by a lot of forest and is approximately 40 km south of the city of Linköping.
