= Mantorp =

- Location within Östergötland Location within Sweden
- Coordinates: 58°21′N 15°17′E
- Country: Sweden
- Province: Östergötland
- County: Östergötland County
- Municipality: Mjölby Municipality

Area
  - Total: 3.35 km^{2} (1.29 sq mi)

Population (31 December 2010)
  - Total: 3,671
  - Density: 1,096/km^{2} (2,840/sq mi)
- Time zone: UTC+1 (CET)
  - Summer (DST): UTC+2 (CEST)

Mantorp is a locality situated in Mjölby Municipality, Östergötland County, Sweden with 3,671 inhabitants in 2010. In the middle of Mantorp there is a small centre where a Christmas market is held annually. The locality is surrounded by farmland. The closest bigger towns are Mjölby about 10 km away and Linköping about 20–30 km away.

Mantorp is the location of the race track Mantorp Park and Mantorp-horse trotting track. There are also a mall in Mantorp called Depot Mantorp (before, it was called Mobilia).
