= Birgittaskolan =

Fashion school in Stockholm, Sweden

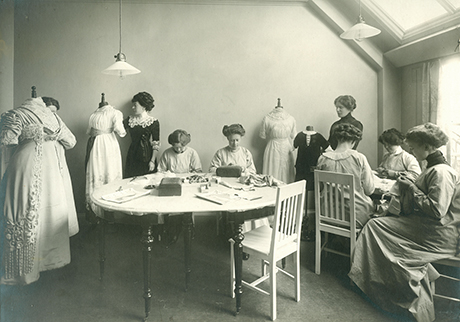
Birgittaskolan (c. 1910) with Emy Fick standing left and Elisabeth Glantzberg standing right

Birgittaskolan or the Birgitta School was a Swedish textile arts establishment in central Stockholm founded in 1910 by Elisabeth Glantzberg and Emy Fick. It not only provided courses in sewing, embroidery and lace work but acted as a fashion studio, satisfying orders for underwear, decorative textiles and rugs. Unable to work together, in 1914 Glantzberg and Fick split their business into two separate firms. Glantzberg maintained the name Birgittaskolan while Fick called hers Sankta Birgittaskolan, emphasizing the connection with St Birgitta. Both establishments prospered until the mid-1930s.

== History ==
Bearing the name of the Swedish Saint Birgitta (1303–1373), the establishment was founded in the spring of 1910 on Regeringsgatan in central Stockholm by Elisabeth Glantzberg and Emy Fick. The two had met in 1909 while working with textiles in the Nordiska Kompaniet department store. Glantzberg had gained experience running a handicrafts business in Boston, Massachusetts, while Fick had worked in Paris at the Worth Fashion House.

The two women were both talented textile artists and both had business experience but they came from quite different backgrounds. Fick, from an upper-class family in Stockholm, was adapt in lace and embroidery, while Glantzberg, brought up in a vicarage in central Sweden, was keen to support and develop folk traditions such as weaving. By 1914, their differing ambitions had reached the point where they could no longer work together. Fick established her business as Sankt Birgittaskolan or the Saint Birgitta School while Glantzberg opened hers a few hundred metres away, maintaining the name Birgittaskolan. After Glantzberg had fought over her establishment's name in the courts, a verdict in the Court of Appeals in 1932 forced her to change it to the Elisabeth Glantzberg School.

The two Birgitta schools both taught dressmaking but Fick catered to upper-class women who aimed to create clothes at home as good housewives while Glantzberg set out to encourage her middle-class students to embark on careers as professionals. Furthermore, she moved into the fashion business by engaging two designers, Siri Derkert and Valle Rosenberg, who produced collections inspired by trends in Paris and Italy. While Glantzberg was not averse to using mass production techniques, Fick was bent on high-quality handmade clothes, believing the time spent on production added value to the result.

Both businesses prospered until the mid-1930s when Glantzberg moved to her native Dalarna and Fick took up residence in the manor at Strålsnäs in Östergötland.
