= Spångsholm =

- Location within Östergötland Location within Sweden
- Coordinates: 58°21′N 15°14′E
- Country: Sweden
- Province: Östergötland
- County: Östergötland County
- Municipality: Mjölby Municipality

Area
  - Total: 0.67 km^{2} (0.26 sq mi)

Population (31 December 2010)
  - Total: 408
  - Density: 610/km^{2} (1,600/sq mi)
- Time zone: UTC+1 (CET)
  - Summer (DST): UTC+2 (CEST)

Spångsholm is a locality situated in Mjölby Municipality, Östergötland County, Sweden with 408 inhabitants in 2010.
