= Väderstad =

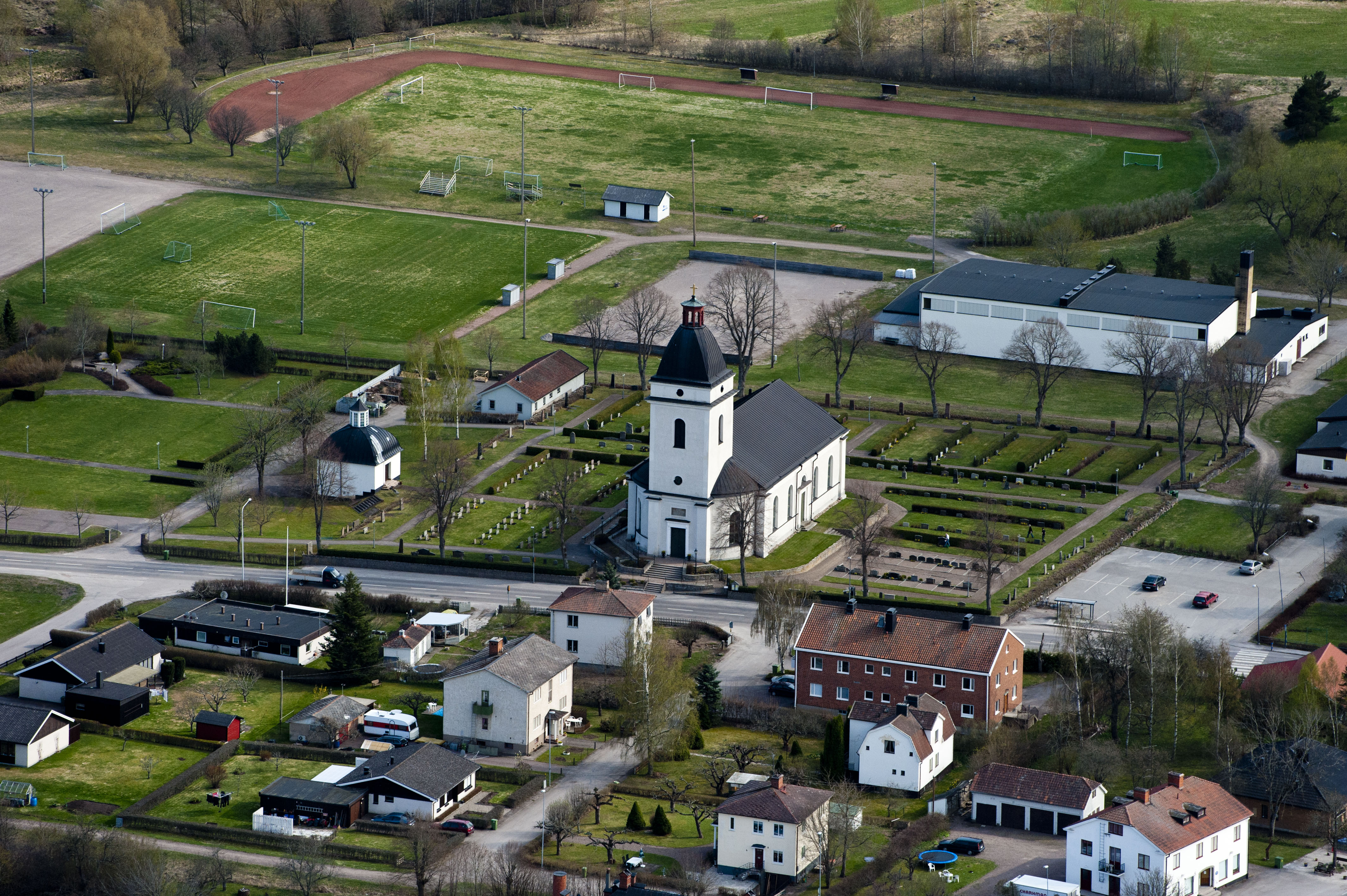
- Aerial view of Väderstad Church

- Location within Östergötland Location within Sweden
- Coordinates: 58°19′N 14°55′E
- Country: Sweden
- Province: Östergötland
- County: Östergötland County
- Municipality: Mjölby Municipality

Area
  - Total: 0.98 km^{2} (0.38 sq mi)

Population (31 December 2010)
  - Total: 583
  - Density: 593/km^{2} (1,540/sq mi)
- Time zone: UTC+1 (CET)
  - Summer (DST): UTC+2 (CEST)

Väderstad is a locality situated in Mjölby Municipality, Östergötland County, Sweden with 583 inhabitants in 2010.

== Sports ==
- Väderstads IK
