= Östra Ryd =

- Location within Östergötland Location within Sweden
- Coordinates: 58°24′N 16°09′E
- Country: Sweden
- Province: Östergötland
- County: Östergötland County
- Municipality: Söderköping Municipality

Area
  - Total: 0.76 km^{2} (0.29 sq mi)

Population (31 December 2010)
  - Total: 457
  - Density: 599/km^{2} (1,550/sq mi)
- Time zone: UTC+1 (CET)
  - Summer (DST): UTC+2 (CEST)

Östra Ryd is a locality situated in Söderköping Municipality, Östergötland County, Sweden with 457 inhabitants in 2010.
