= Gistad =

- Location within Östergötland Location within Sweden
- Coordinates: 58°27′N 15°54′E
- Country: Sweden
- Province: Östergötland
- County: Östergötland County
- Municipality: Linköping Municipality

Area
  - Total: 0.43 km^{2} (0.17 sq mi)

Population (31 December 2020)
  - Total: 298
  - Density: 690/km^{2} (1,800/sq mi)
- Time zone: UTC+1 (CET)
  - Summer (DST): UTC+2 (CEST)

Gistad (Swedish pronunciation: [ˈjîːsta]) is a locality situated in Linköping Municipality, Östergötland County, Sweden with 288 inhabitants in 2010.
