= Väderstads IK =

Swedish sports club

- Full name: Väderstads idrottsklubb
- Sport: soccer, bandy, boxing, orienteering, skiing (earlier)
- Founded: 1938
- Based in: Väderstad, Sweden

Väderstads IK is a sports club in Väderstad, Sweden, established in 1938.

The women's soccer team played in the Swedish top division in 1980 and 1981.
