= Sya, Sweden =

Sya
- Location within Östergötland Location within Sweden
- Coordinates: 58°20′N 15°13′E
- Country: Sweden
- Province: Östergötland
- County: Östergötland County
- Municipality: Mjölby Municipality

Area
  - Total: 0.36 km^{2} (0.14 sq mi)

Population (31 December 2010)
  - Total: 306
  - Density: 850/km^{2} (2,200/sq mi)
- Time zone: UTC+1 (CET)
  - Summer (DST): UTC+2 (CEST)

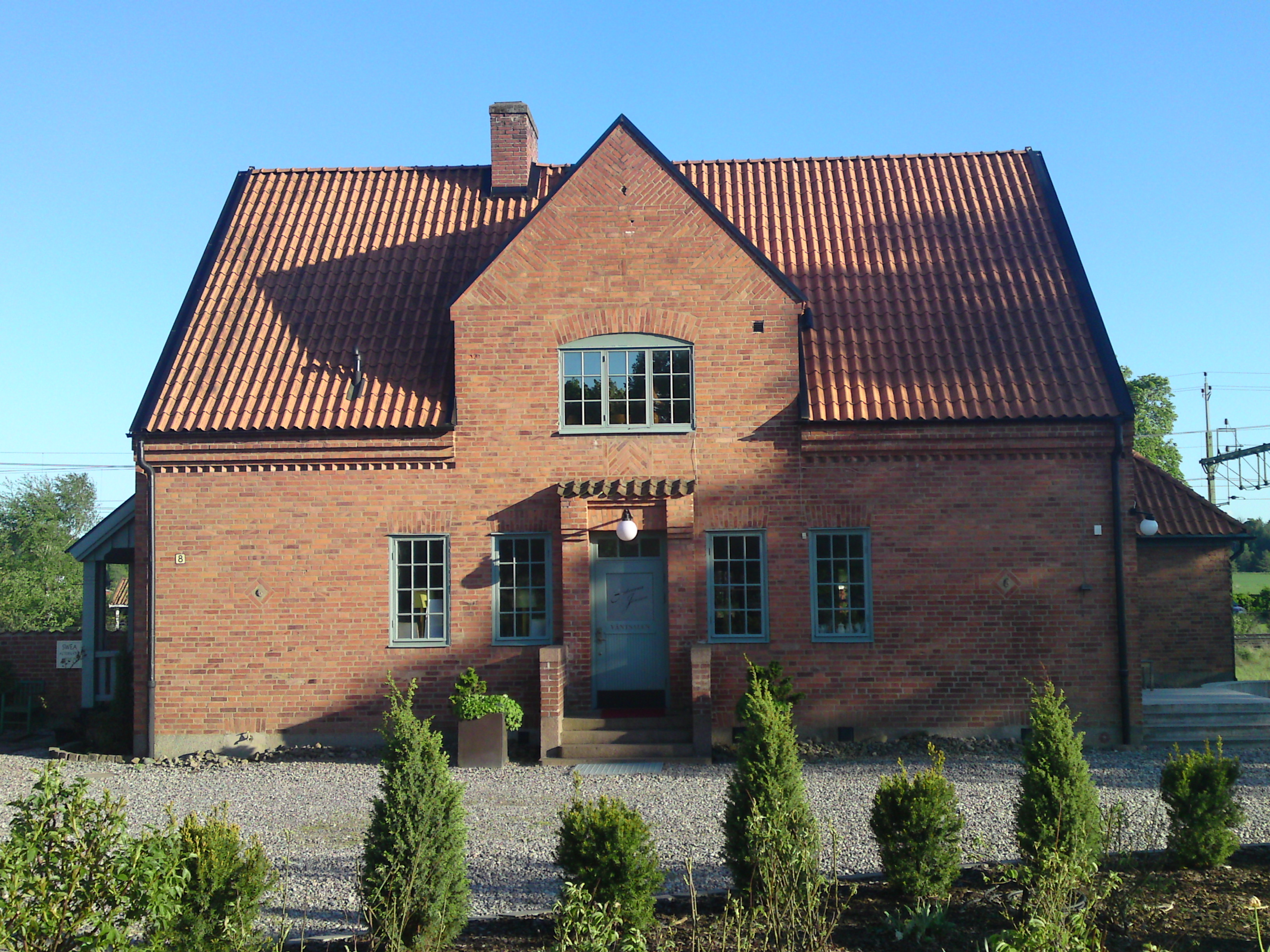
Sya station, Östergötland, Sweden

Sya is a locality situated in Mjölby Municipality, Östergötland County, Sweden with 306 inhabitants in 2010.
