= Elisabeth Glantzberg =

Swedish textile artist, educator and fashion designer

Elisabeth Margareta
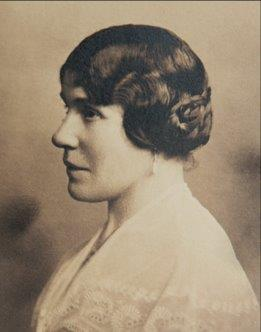
- Glantzberg in 1918
- Born: Elisabeth Margareta Glantzberg; 1873; Dalarna, Sweden
- Died: 1951 (aged 77–78)
- Occupations: Textile artist, teacher, fashion designer

Elisabeth Margareta Glantzberg (1873–1951) was a Swedish textile artist, educator and fashion designer. After spending several years teaching weaving and promoting Swedish textiles in Boston, Massachusetts, at the beginning of the 20th century, she returned to Sweden in 1909 where together with Emy Fick she established the Birgittaskolan in Stockholm. In addition to providing courses, the Birgitta School served as a leading textile studio producing decorative works, tapestries and rugs. She went on to produce fashionable clothing there until the mid-1930s, based on Parisian trends in haute couture and everyday wear.

== Biography ==
Born on 20 October 1873 in Dalarna in central Sweden, Elisabeth Margaretha Glantzberg was the daughter of Christian Magnus Glantzberg, a cleric, and Hilda Dorotea Glantzberg, née Arborelius. The youngest child in the family, she had three sisters and a brother.

Although she had no formal training, Glantzberg and her sisters sewed and created textiles at home, like many other children of the times. Around 1900, she and her sister Ellen moved to Boston where her brother Ernst had emigrated in 1891. The two sisters created a business called The Misses Glantzberg which was both a textile school and a retail business displaying Swedish handicrafts and home furnishings. From 1903, as an active member of The Society of Arts and Crafts of Boston, she exhibited her creations on several occasions.

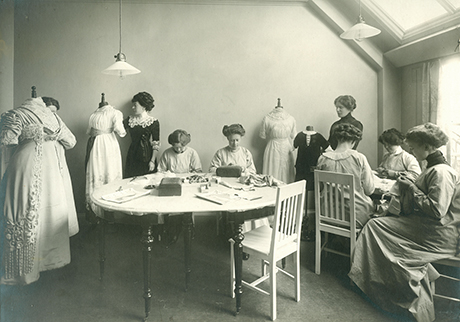
Brittaskolan (1910)

She returned to Sweden in 1909. Working with children's clothing in Stockholm's Nordiska Kompaniet department store, she met Emy Fick. In 1910, they jointly establish Birgittaskolan in central Stockholm. Offering courses in sewing, embroidery and lace, the firm also satisfied orders for underwear, decorative textiles and rugs.

Apparently as a result of their varying backgrounds, Glantzberg, who encouraged women to learn textile arts so that they could work professionally, broke up with Fick, whose training was directed towards women keen to produce textiles at home. They split the business into two separate firms. Glantzberg kept the name Birgittaskolan while Fick called hers Sankta Birgittaskolan or Saint Birgitta School. In 1917, Glantzberg moved into fashion, employing two designers to follow Parisian trends creating remarkably daring collections.

Glantzberg's business thrived until the mid-1930s. She later returned to her native Dalarna where she ran a weaving school. She died in Älvdalen on 10 December 1951.
