= Roxen (lake) =

Lake in Norrköping Municipality, Östergötland County, Sweden

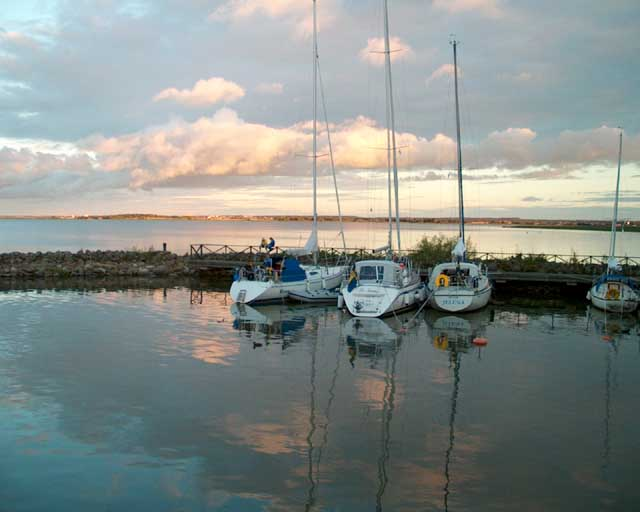
- Roxen at sunset

- Location within Östergötland Location within Sweden
- Coordinates: 58°30′N 15°41′E
- Primary inflows: Motala ström, Svartån, Stångån
- Primary outflows: Motala ström
- Basin countries: Sweden
- Surface area: 97 km^{2} (37 sq mi)
- Max. depth: 8 m (26 ft)
- Surface elevation: 32 m (105 ft)

Ramsar Wetland
- Official name: Västra Roxen
- Designated: 14 November 2001
- Reference no.: 1133

Roxen (Swedish pronunciation: [ˈrɔ̌ksɛn]) is a medium-sized lake in south-central Sweden, east of Lake Vättern, part of the waterpath Motala ström and the Göta Canal. South of Lake Roxen is the city Linköping.

Roxen, especially the western parts, is very good for birdwatching. There are natural reserves at Kungsbro and Svartåmynningen.

The lake develops in a graben depression.
