= Boxholm =

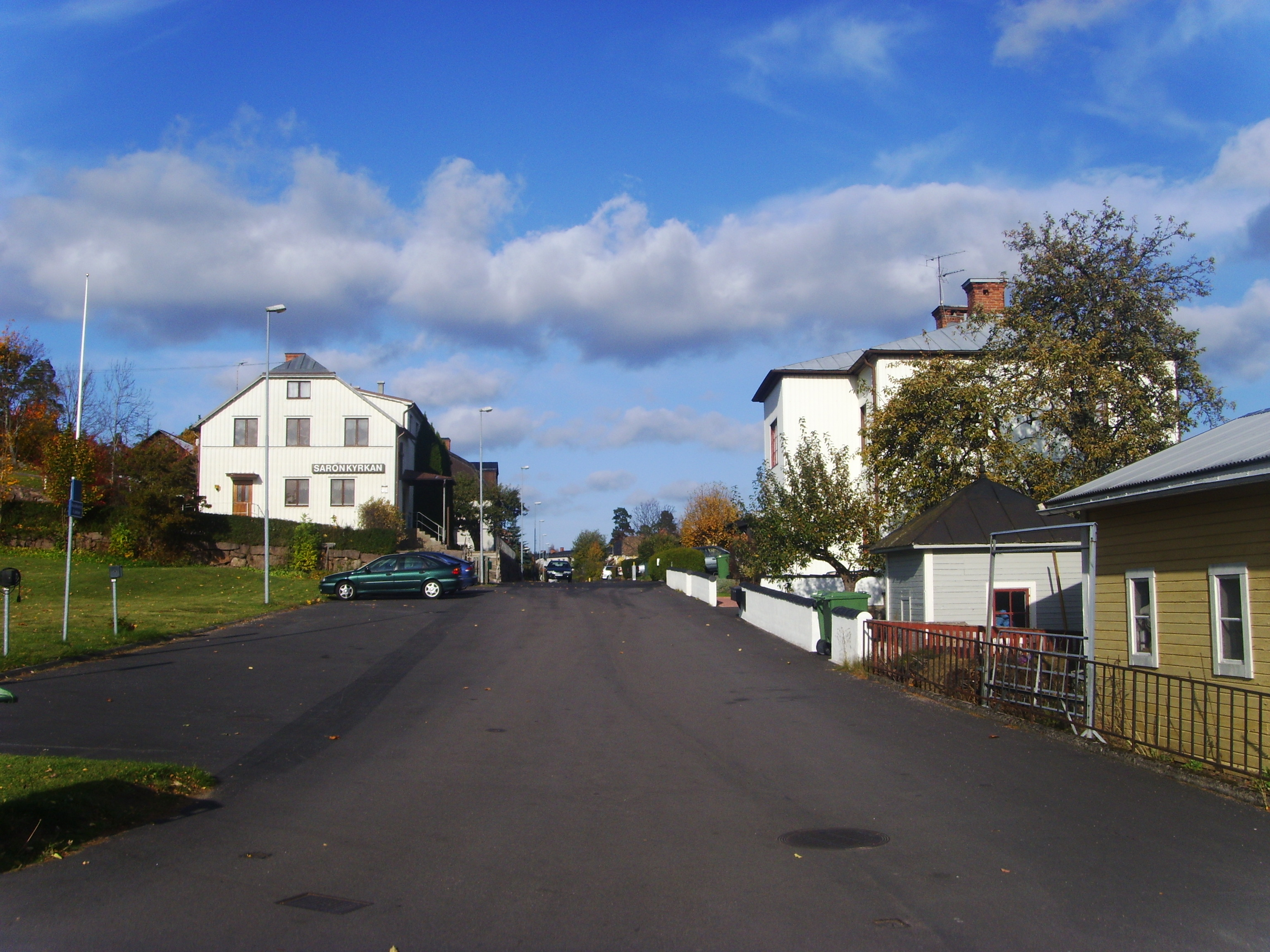

- Location within Östergötland Location within Sweden
- Coordinates: 58°12′N 15°03′E
- Country: Sweden
- Province: Östergötland
- County: Östergötland County
- Municipality: Boxholm Municipality

Area
  - Total: 4.39 km^{2} (1.69 sq mi)

Population (31 December 2020)
  - Total: 3,846
  - Density: 876/km^{2} (2,270/sq mi)
- Time zone: UTC+1 (CET)
  - Summer (DST): UTC+2 (CEST)
- Climate: Dfb

Boxholm (Swedish pronunciation: [ˈbʊ̂ksˌhɔlm], [ˈbɔ̂ks-], traditionally also [bʊksˈhɔ̌lm], [bɔks-]) is a locality and the seat of Boxholm Municipality, Östergötland County, Sweden with 3,194 inhabitants in 2010.

== Economy ==
Steel production company Ovako has a production site in Boxholm with approximately 200 employees.

== Sports ==
The following sports clubs are located in Boxholm:

- Boxholms IF
