= Boxholm Municipality =

Boxholm Municipality Boxholms kommun
- Municipality
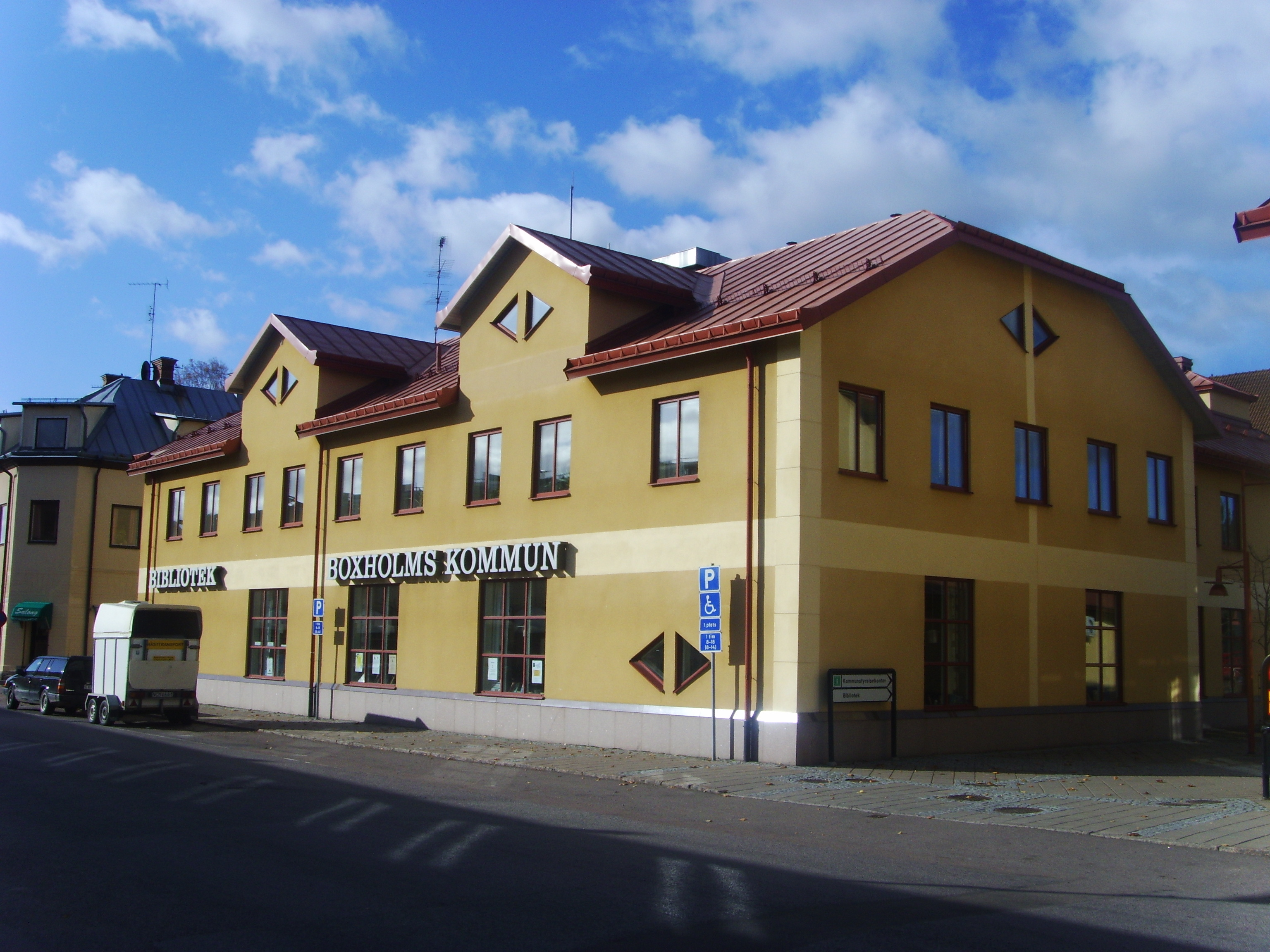
- Boxholm Library

- Coat of arms

- Coordinates: 58°12′N 15°03′E
- Country: Sweden
- County: Östergötland County
- Seat: Boxholm

Area
  - Total: 603.87 km^{2} (233.16 sq mi)
  - Land: 525.77 km^{2} (203.00 sq mi)
  - Water: 78.1 km^{2} (30.2 sq mi)
- Area as of 1 January 2014.

Population (30 June 2025)
  - Total: 5,456
  - Density: 10.38/km^{2} (26.88/sq mi)
- Time zone: UTC+1 (CET)
  - Summer (DST): UTC+2 (CEST)
- ISO 3166 code: SE
- Province: Östergötland
- Municipal code: 0560
- Website: www.boxholm.se

Boxholm Municipality (Swedish: Boxholms kommun) is a municipality in Östergötland County in southeast Sweden. Its seat is located in the industrial town of Boxholm.

The present municipality was formed in 1971, when the market town (köping) Boxholm (itself instituted in 1947) was amalgamated with Södra Göstring and a parish (Rinna) from the dissolved municipality of Folkunga.

== Localities ==
- Boxholm (seat)
- Strålsnäs

== Demographics ==
This is a demographic table based on Boxholm Municipality's electoral districts in the 2022 Swedish general election sourced from SVT's election platform, in turn taken from SCB official statistics.

In total there were 5,511 residents, including 4,307 Swedish citizens of voting age. 48.6% voted for the left coalition and 50.0% for the right coalition. Indicators are in percentage points except population totals and income.

Location	Residents	Citizen adults	Left vote	Right vote	Employed	Swedish parents	Foreign heritage	Income SEK	Degree
Location			%	%					
Boxholm V	2,169	1,672	49.1	49.5	82	83	17	26,033	25
Boxholm Ö-Malexander	1,999	1,574	51.9	46.8	81	89	11	23,877	30
Strålsnäs-Åsbo-Ekeby	1,343	1,061	43.6	55.4	84	94	6	26,288	32
Source: SVT

== History ==
The earliest human traces are from the Stone Age, circa 8000 BC. From some later times, the Nordic Bronze Age, are several remains such as cists and gravefields. And from the Viking Age, ca 800–1,000 AD, are seven kept runestones.

After the christianisation of Sweden, churches were built in the 12th and 13th century, and several churches have their foundation from that time.

The name "Boxholm" is first to be found in the 16th century, as the name of a manor by Arvid Stenbock. Boxholm thus comes from "Bock's holm" (holm a modern Swedish and Old Norse word for islet).

An iron works was constructed in 1754, and a community grew up around it. The major expansion were however made in the 1850–1900.

== See also ==
- Boxholm, Iowa
