= Kinda Municipality =

Kinda Municipality Kinda kommun
- Municipality
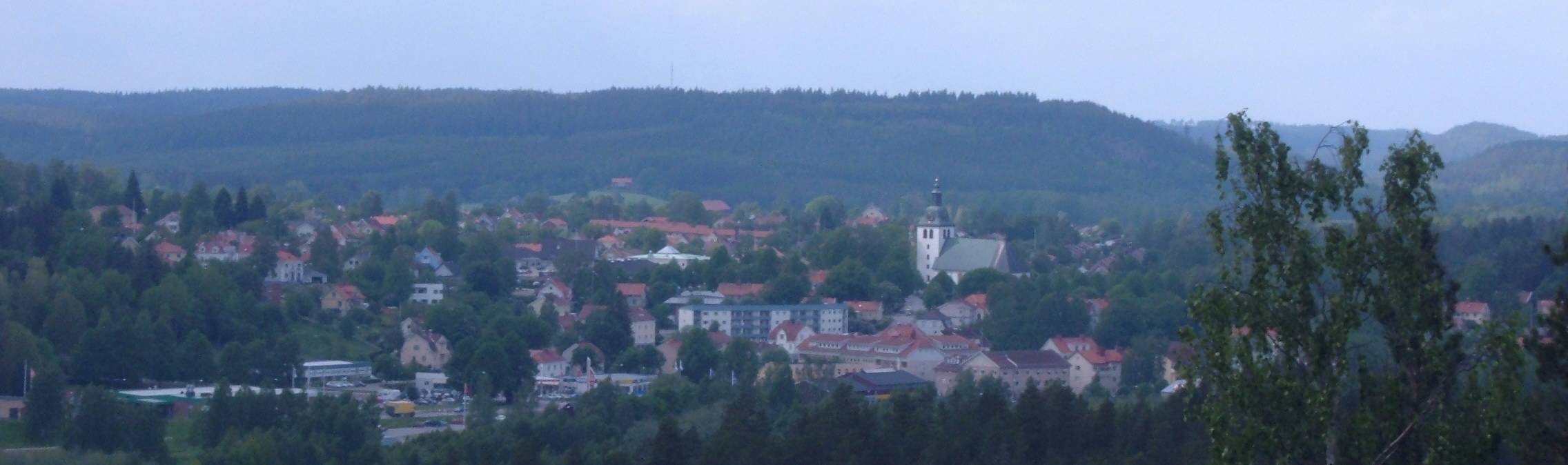

- Coat of arms

- Coordinates: 57°59′N 15°37′E
- Country: Sweden
- County: Östergötland County
- Seat: Kisa

Area
  - Total: 1,301.96 km^{2} (502.69 sq mi)
  - Land: 1,129.47 km^{2} (436.09 sq mi)
  - Water: 172.49 km^{2} (66.60 sq mi)
- Area as of 1 January 2014.

Population (30 June 2025)
  - Total: 9,952
  - Density: 8.811/km^{2} (22.82/sq mi)
- Time zone: UTC+1 (CET)
  - Summer (DST): UTC+2 (CEST)
- ISO 3166 code: SE
- Province: Östergötland
- Municipal code: 0513
- Website: www.kinda.se

Kinda Municipality (Swedish: Kinda kommun) is a municipality in Östergötland County, southeast Sweden. The municipal seat is located in the town Kisa, with some 4,000 inhabitants.

The present municipality was created in 1974 through the amalgamation of three municipalities called Norra Kinda, Södra Kinda and Västra Kinda (North, South and West Kinda respectively), which had been formed in 1952 from the nine original entities. The name was taken from the old Kinda Hundred.

== Localities ==
- Horn
- Kisa (seat)
- Rimforsa

== Demographics ==
This is a demographic table based on Kinda Municipality's electoral districts in the 2022 Swedish general election sourced from SVT's election platform, in turn taken from SCB official statistics.

In total there were 10,040 residents, including 7,765 Swedish citizens of voting age. 46.1% voted for the left coalition and 52.4% for the right coalition. Indicators are in percentage points except population totals and income.

Location	Residents	Citizen adults	Left vote	Right vote	Employed	Swedish parents	Foreign heritage	Income SEK	Degree
Location			%	%					
Horn-Hycklinge	1,440	1,200	39.4	56.2	83	92	8	22,604	31
Kisa samhälle	1,577	1,255	47.1	52.3	87	89	11	23,855	24
Kisa SÖ	1,704	1,273	45.8	53.6	78	81	19	22,286	26
Kisa V	1,642	1,216	45.6	53.0	82	83	17	23,560	22
Rimforsa N	1,775	1,373	50.5	48.4	84	94	6	25,137	41
Rimforsa S	1,902	1,448	47.1	52.0	90	95	5	28,181	46
Source: SVT

== Nature ==
Naturewise, the municipality is above all known for the Kinda Canal, a waterway of canals taking boat tours from lake Roxen south through Linköping, ending in Horn. The total of distance is 90 km.
