= Mjölby =

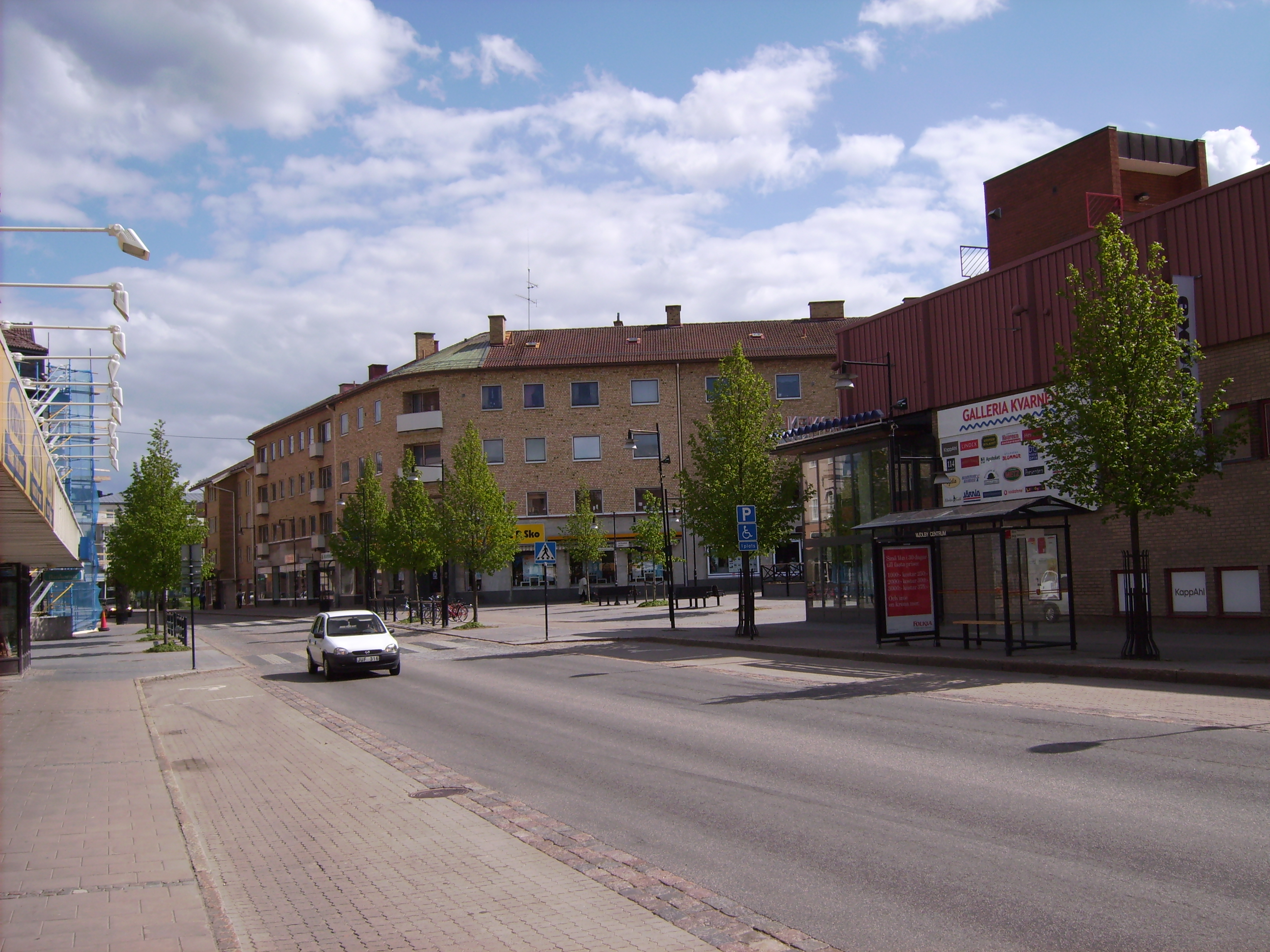
- Central Mjölby in May 2007

- Location within Östergötland Location within Sweden
- Coordinates: 58°20′N 15°07′E
- Country: Sweden
- Province: Östergötland
- County: Östergötland County
- Municipality: Mjölby Municipality

Area
  - Total: 8.45 km^{2} (3.26 sq mi)

Population (31 December 2010)
  - Total: 12,245
  - Density: 1,448/km^{2} (3,750/sq mi)
- Time zone: UTC+1 (CET)
  - Summer (DST): UTC+2 (CEST)

Mjölby (Swedish pronunciation: [ˈmjø̌ːlbʏ] or [ˈmjœ̌lːbʏ]) is a city and the seat of Mjölby Municipality, Östergötland County, Sweden with 14,191 inhabitants in 2024.

Mjölby is located by the rivulet Svartån. The name Mjölby is derived from Mölloby, which comes from mylna or mölna, meaning 'mill'. Due to the rapids of Svartån and the fertile soils of the surrounding plains, Mjölby is a natural place for a mill.

During the Dacke War in 1542–1543, Mjölby was the northernmost point reached by the rebels from Småland.

== Main attractions ==
- Skogsjöområdets Naturreservat (nature reserve and camping)
- Mjölby Hembygdsförening (park and garden)
- Runestones of Högby (historical landmark)
- Örbackens kalkkärr (national reserve)
- Galleria kvarnen (shopping mall)
- Stadsparken (park)
- Potatisrondellen (a potato roundabout)
- Mjölby kyrka (church)

== Sports ==
The following sports clubs are located in Mjölby:

- Mjölby AI FF
- Mjölby HC
- Mjölby Södra IF
- Mjölby Allmänna Ryttarsällskap
- Mjölby Ridklubb
- Mjölby IBK (Black bears)

== Twinnings ==
- Hankasalmi, Finland
