= Strålsnäs =

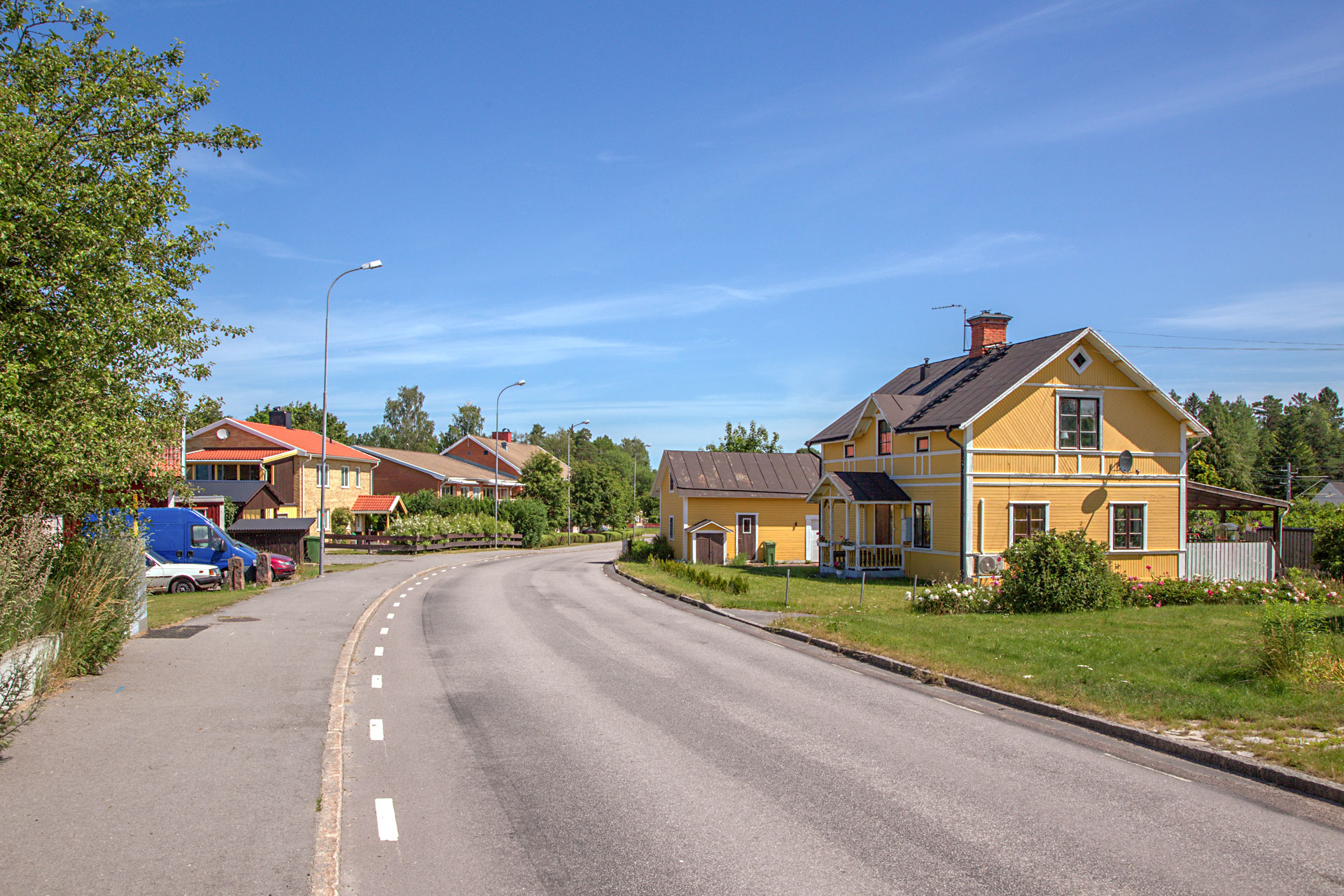

- Location within Östergötland Location within Sweden
- Coordinates: 58°14′N 15°06′E
- Country: Sweden
- Province: Östergötland
- County: Östergötland County
- Municipality: Boxholm Municipality

Area
  - Total: 0.64 km^{2} (0.25 sq mi)

Population (31 December 2020)
  - Total: 401
  - Density: 630/km^{2} (1,600/sq mi)
- Time zone: UTC+1 (CET)
  - Summer (DST): UTC+2 (CEST)

Strålsnäs is a locality situated in Boxholm Municipality, Östergötland County, Sweden with 410 inhabitants in 2010.
