= Mjölby Municipality =

Mjölby Municipality Mjölby kommun
- Municipality
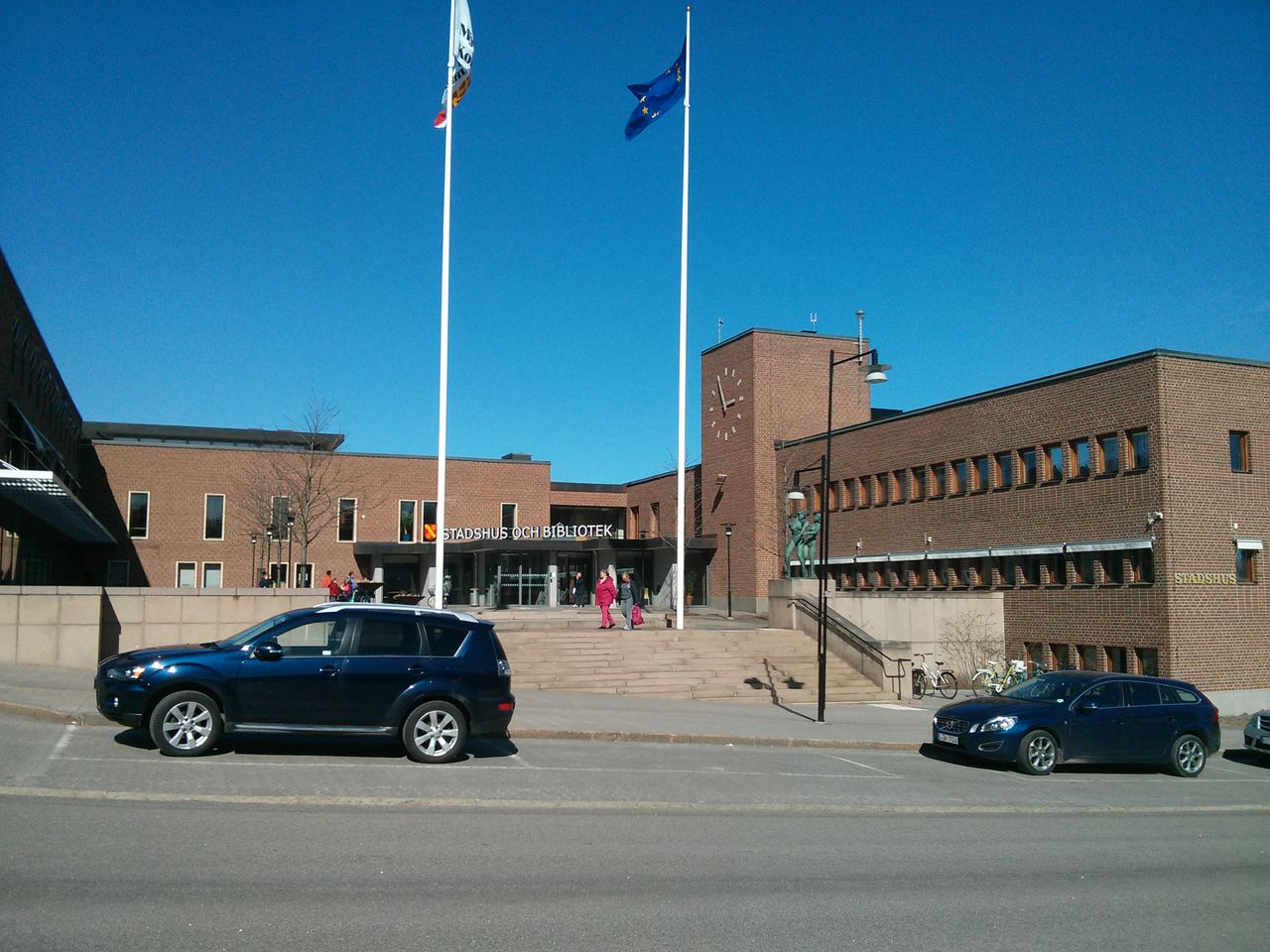
- Mjölby Town Hall/Library

- Coat of arms

- Coordinates: 58°20′N 15°07′E
- Country: Sweden
- County: Östergötland County
- Seat: Mjölby

Area
  - Total: 557.190275 km^{2} (215.132368 sq mi)
  - Land: 546.110275 km^{2} (210.854356 sq mi)
  - Water: 11.08 km^{2} (4.28 sq mi)
- Area as of 1 January 2014.

Population (30 June 2025)
  - Total: 28,751
  - Density: 52.647/km^{2} (136.35/sq mi)
- Time zone: UTC+1 (CET)
  - Summer (DST): UTC+2 (CEST)
- ISO 3166 code: SE
- Province: Östergötland
- Municipal code: 0586
- Website: www.mjolby.se

Mjölby Municipality (Swedish: Mjölby kommun) is a municipality in Östergötland County in southeast Sweden. Its seat is located in the city of Mjölby, with some 13,000 inhabitants.

The present municipality was established in 1971, when the City of Mjölby, the City of Skänninge and the rural municipalities in the vicinity were amalgamated into the new entity. There are about twenty original units within Mjölby Municipality.

== Localities ==
- Bjälbo
- Hogstad
- Mantorp
- Mjölby (seat)
- Skänninge
- Spångsholm
- Sya
- Väderstad

== Demographics ==
This is a demographic table based on Mjölby Municipality's electoral districts in the 2022 Swedish general election sourced from SVT's election platform, in turn taken from SCB official statistics.

In total there were 28,244 residents, including 21,414 Swedish citizens of voting age. 44.3% voted for the left coalition and 54.7% for the right coalition. Indicators are in percentage points except population totals and income.

Location	Residents	Citizen adults	Left vote	Right vote	Employed	Swedish parents	Foreign heritage	Income SEK	Degree
Location			%	%					
Dacke-Edebybacken	1,459	1,285	49.6	49.7	79	84	16	22,689	27
Eldlösa	1,843	1,361	44.7	55.0	89	92	8	30,825	44
Högby	1,852	1,355	45.4	53.6	77	77	23	24,263	28
Lagman	1,270	1,023	45.6	52.4	81	87	13	24,934	35
Mantorp C	1,647	1,264	47.1	52.3	89	94	6	27,169	39
Normlösa	959	734	32.7	66.3	87	95	5	28,740	40
Norrgården-Albacken	1,895	1,600	48.7	50.5	79	82	18	24,872	34
Skänninge C-Hattorp	1,403	1,091	45.3	53.6	75	86	14	21,478	25
Skänninge landsbygd	1,266	949	37.4	62.3	83	92	8	26,245	29
Slomarp-Egeby	1,998	1,356	51.6	47.0	70	66	34	20,801	29
Sya-V Harg-Ö Tollstad	1,563	1,218	36.7	62.4	90	95	5	27,883	36
Vasastaden	1,278	1,015	47.0	52.1	85	93	7	27,030	34
Veta	1,363	990	42.0	57.2	90	91	9	30,211	42
Viby	1,937	1,356	41.2	58.2	89	88	12	30,386	46
Väderstad-Appuna	1,505	1,221	38.4	60.6	88	94	6	27,623	34
V Lund-Trojenborg	1,434	1,106	44.2	54.8	84	88	12	23,934	25
Västra Lundby	1,448	1,071	52.8	45.4	74	71	29	21,460	28
Östra Lundby	2,124	1,419	44.9	53.2	75	67	33	25,376	36
Source: SVT

== Education ==
Mjölby has a school for goldsmiths and a school for engine drivers.

== Twin cities ==
- Karmøy kommune, Rogaland, Norway
- Hankasalmi, Finland
- Häädemeeste, Estonia
- Rudkøbing and Slangerup, Denmark
