= Linköping Municipality =

Linköping Municipality Linköpings kommun
- Municipality
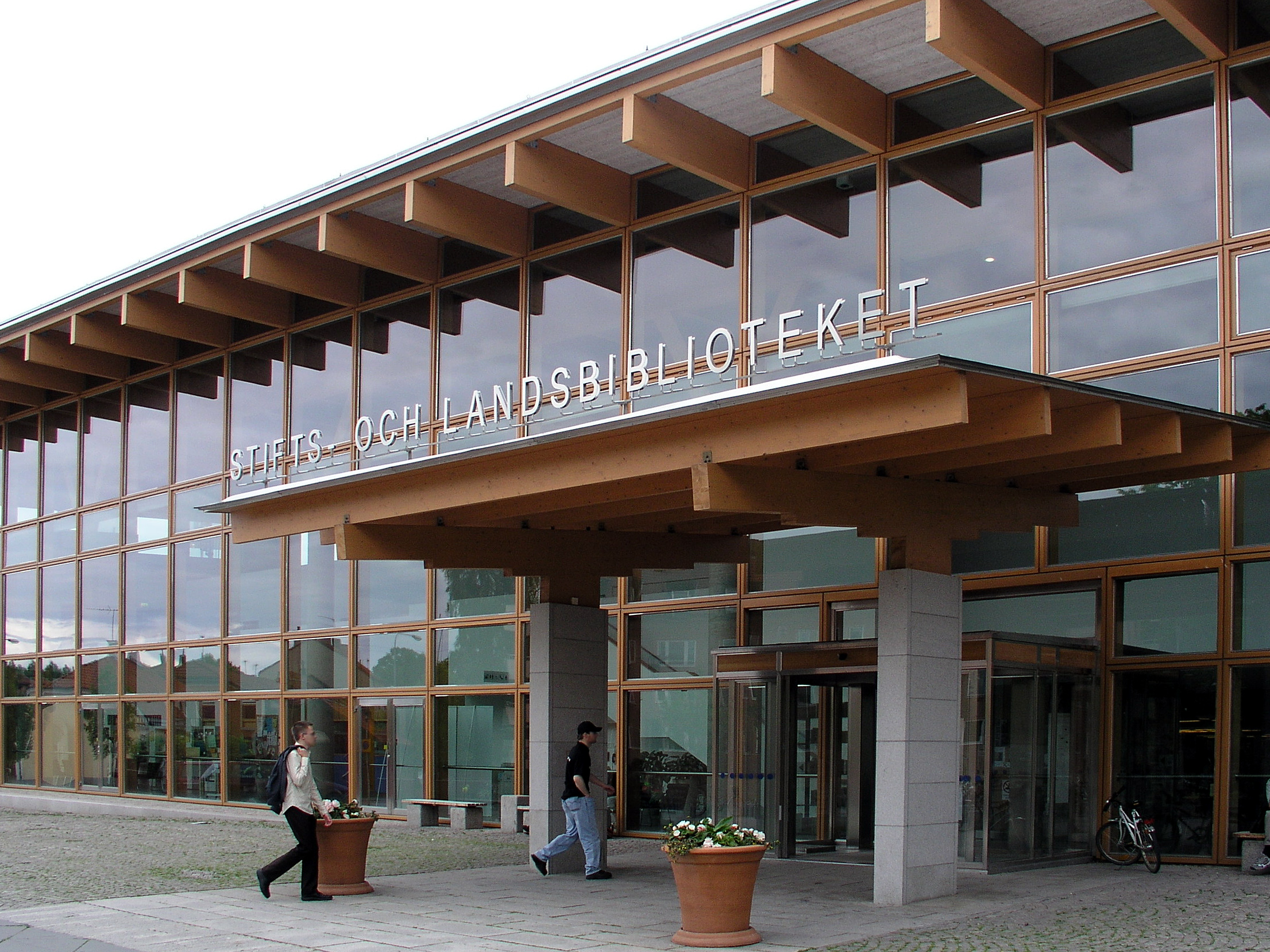
- Linköping Library

- Coat of arms
- Motto: Linköping - where ideas come to life
- Coordinates: 58°24′N 15°37′E
- Country: Sweden
- County: Östergötland County
- Seat: Linköping

Area
  - Total: 1,568.26 km^{2} (605.51 sq mi)
  - Land: 1,427.44 km^{2} (551.14 sq mi)
  - Water: 140.82 km^{2} (54.37 sq mi)
- Area as of 1 January 2014.

Population (30 June 2025)
  - Total: 167,439
  - Density: 117.300/km^{2} (303.806/sq mi)
- Time zone: UTC+1 (CET)
  - Summer (DST): UTC+2 (CEST)
- ISO 3166 code: SE
- Province: Östergötland
- Municipal code: 0580
- Website: www.linkoping.se

Linköping Municipality (Swedish: Linköpings kommun) is a municipality in Östergötland County in southern Sweden. With more than 165,000 inhabitants, it is the fifth largest municipality in Sweden.

The municipality is bordered in the west by Motala, and thence clockwise by Finspång, Norrköping, Söderköping, Åtvidaberg, Kinda, Boxholm and Mjölby municipalities.

The present municipality was formed in 1971 by the amalgamation of the City of Linköping with five surrounding rural municipalities. The number of original local government entities (as of 1863) making up Linköping Municipality is 32.

Linköping is one of the few municipalities in Sweden to style the speaker of the assembly as mayor.

Linköping wants to create a sustainable development of the city and therefore plan to become a carbon neutral community by 2025.

== Demographics ==
This is a demographic table based on Linköping Municipality's electoral districts in the 2022 Swedish general election sourced from SVT's election platform, in turn taken from SCB official statistics.

In total there were 165,293 residents, including 124,369 Swedish citizens of voting age. 50.5% voted for the left coalition and 48.1% for the right coalition.

Location	Residents	Citizen adults	Left vote	Right vote	Employed	Swedish parents	Foreign heritage	Income SEK	Degree
Location			%	%					
Bankekind	1,123	867	41.3	57.9	92	93	7	30,747	55
Berga 1, Ramshäll	1,807	1,389	52.8	45.3	73	71	29	25,339	56
Berga 2, NO	1,708	1,140	68.6	28.0	58	30	70	16,048	39
Berga 3, NV	2,068	1,175	71.4	25.4	59	28	72	15,950	35
Berga 4, SO	1,453	1,109	55.0	43.6	84	83	17	30,132	63
Berga 5, Vidingsjö N	1,376	1,022	47.8	51.8	91	91	9	34,133	73
Berga 6, SV	1,897	1,288	54.5	42.8	69	58	42	21,013	47
Berga 7, Vidingsjö S	1,305	1,130	55.8	43.4	85	90	10	26,098	52
Berga 8, Haninge	1,492	1,073	56.8	42.4	82	85	15	27,878	48
Berga 9, Hagaberg	1,044	882	55.9	43.7	88	84	16	34,756	80
Berga 10, S Ekkällan N	1,641	1,329	53.9	44.7	84	81	19	30,798	71
Berga 11, S Ekkällan S	1,350	1,199	50.4	48.1	82	80	20	28,313	73
Domkyrko 1, Ne Vasastaden V	1,684	1,537	48.0	50.8	81	82	18	26,631	54
Domkyrko 2, Hunneberg	1,641	1,512	52.1	46.7	76	87	13	23,403	60
Domkyrko 3, Öv Vasastaden Ö	1,425	1,222	46.9	51.0	73	80	20	23,656	59
Domkyrko 4, Öv Vasastaden V	1,729	1,319	54.7	43.1	75	63	37	23,446	45
Domkyrko 5, Ne Vasastaden Ö	1,534	1,366	44.4	54.5	78	81	19	27,515	60
Domkyrko 6, Kanberget	1,526	1,337	50.1	48.5	77	85	15	28,058	64
Domkyrko 7, Innerstaden S	1,808	1,554	47.8	50.5	78	79	21	25,539	60
Domkyrko 8, Ekkällan	1,485	1,247	62.9	36.1	74	73	27	23,408	57
Domkyrko 9, Gottfridsberg NO	1,476	1,350	55.9	42.0	73	73	27	23,077	48
Domkyrko 10, Gottfridsberg SO	1,429	1,132	52.4	46.6	60	84	16	18,601	71
Domkyrko 11, Fridhem	1,007	861	56.5	42.5	70	91	9	29,376	85
Domkyrko 12, Barhäll	1,673	1,344	54.3	44.7	82	82	18	29,010	66
Domkyrko 13, Åbylund	1,495	1,357	57.0	41.1	70	75	25	20,456	52
Domkyrko 14, Valla	1,625	1,307	54.2	44.3	78	87	13	28,913	78
Domkyrko 15, T1 N	1,369	1,112	57.7	39.7	66	80	20	20,884	73
Domkyrko 16, T1 S	1,699	1,264	59.5	38.9	83	81	19	30,988	70
Domkyrko 17, Innerstaden N	1,761	1,522	46.4	52.2	80	79	21	28,107	59
Domkyrko 18, Öv Vasastaden N	1,813	1,454	44.5	54.1	78	77	23	28,885	61
Domkyrko 19, Folkets park	1,258	1,049	55.8	43.4	77	80	20	28,269	65
Domkyrko 20, Vallastaden N	1,904	1,546	49.3	49.1	40	78	22	5,593	82
Domkyrko 21, Vallastaden S	697	675	44.1	54.1	63	73	27	16,706	77
Domkyrko 22, Ebbe park	1,002	1,092	52.4	46.1	26	85	15	3,854	82
Flistad-Ljung	1,498	1,117	45.7	53.1	88	93	7	30,134	50
Johannelund 1, Vimanshäll	1,877	1,466	50.4	48.1	82	79	21	30,202	63
Johannelund 2, NV	1,384	998	56.2	40.5	70	62	38	21,607	43
Johannelund 3, NO	1,288	1,133	54.0	44.1	80	81	19	23,770	46
Johannelund 4, Ånestad	1,599	1,200	55.8	43.3	91	91	9	34,164	71
Johannelund 5, SV	1,555	1,281	56.6	41.3	85	86	14	27,007	56
Johannelund 6, SO	1,591	1,192	49.5	49.6	79	76	24	26,750	55
Kaga-Ledberg	974	736	38.3	61.0	92	92	8	32,329	58
Kärna 1, Malmslätt SO	1,102	881	47.0	51.8	83	87	13	29,970	52
Kärna 2, Malmslätt M	1,256	991	48.9	49.9	84	88	12	28,817	56
Kärna 3, Tokarp	1,490	1,070	49.0	50.2	88	79	21	29,492	52
Kärna 4, Malmslätt V	1,511	1,208	52.8	46.6	88	85	15	27,898	51
Landeryd 1, Hackefors	1,891	1,405	44.1	55.5	90	93	7	34,622	68
Landeryd 2, Ekholmen NO	1,815	1,335	53.5	44.9	78	75	25	22,656	45
Landeryd 3, Kvinneby	1,578	1,250	44.7	54.1	88	89	11	28,417	64
Landeryd 4, Ekholmen NV	1,729	1,452	55.3	43.8	83	79	21	24,935	50
Landeryd 5, Ekholmen SO	1,500	1,265	50.4	48.2	79	84	16	21,609	33
Landeryd 6, Hjulsbro M	1,592	1,199	42.8	56.2	89	88	12	37,302	71
Landeryd 7, Ekholmen SV	1,790	1,271	51.8	46.7	88	86	14	29,102	54
Landeryd 8, Ullstämma	2,334	1,565	50.6	48.8	89	88	12	34,461	67
Landeryd 9, Möjetorp	2,321	1,465	46.3	53.0	91	87	13	33,730	67
Lillkyrka-Gistad	658	532	43.3	55.0	90	93	7	28,452	40
Nykil-Gammalkil	2,110	1,631	42.7	56.0	89	95	5	28,716	46
Rappestad-Vikingstad N	1,546	1,176	42.0	57.4	91	94	6	31,008	48
Ryd 1, N	1,715	1,309	56.9	41.5	53	67	33	13,231	73
Ryd 2, SO	2,152	1,320	56.6	41.0	54	48	52	12,726	60
Ryd 3, SV	1,853	951	64.6	30.8	38	24	76	5,730	50
Ryd 4, NO	1,749	1,147	69.8	25.7	58	38	62	15,062	42
Ryd 5, M	1,659	1,038	55.3	41.6	19	52	48	1,340	87
Rystad 2, Tallboda V	1,528	1,100	37.4	61.8	86	81	19	29,817	45
Rystad 3, Tallboda Ö	2,021	1,403	45.2	54.1	90	79	21	30,799	48
Rystad 4, Ekängen	2,799	1,816	35.6	63.7	90	87	13	42,807	76
S:t Lars 1, Innerstaden NO	1,682	1,373	48.7	49.4	76	70	30	25,969	52
S:t Lars 2, Innerstaden Ö	1,312	1,169	43.2	55.7	78	79	21	26,252	56
S:t Lars 3, Hejdegården	1,553	1,328	47.1	51.8	75	82	18	25,953	62
S:t Lars 4, Kungsberget V	1,531	1,412	43.2	55.7	84	85	15	29,836	60
S:t Lars 5, Kungsberget	1,703	1,357	45.9	53.2	76	77	23	24,986	49
S:t Lars 6, Råberga	1,730	1,332	48.9	48.6	71	74	26	23,095	50
S:t Lars 7, Innerstaden SO	1,254	1,087	47.2	51.8	76	83	17	25,393	59
S:t Lars 8, Stångån V	1,190	1,051	51.8	46.8	80	77	23	25,787	50
Sjögestad	840	597	42.3	57.3	81	90	10	27,989	43
Skeda	1,916	1,433	44.7	54.3	91	94	6	30,719	54
Skäggetorp 1, C	2,135	1,194	70.3	25.8	50	22	78	13,299	24
Skäggetorp 2, Nygård	1,928	1,203	67.2	29.6	55	25	75	14,644	35
Skäggetorp 3, SV	2,152	1,168	60.0	36.8	55	29	71	15,409	28
Skäggetorp 4, V	2,160	1,047	69.3	25.7	49	22	78	12,514	26
Skäggetorp 5, Tornby	1,881	952	65.8	30.7	51	25	75	12,788	25
Slaka 1, Lambohov C	1,766	1,229	57.0	40.4	58	54	46	16,263	62
Slaka 2, Lambohov Ö	2,305	1,502	54.6	44.6	83	66	34	30,760	68
Slaka 3, Lilla Mjärdevi	1,758	1,281	52.6	46.5	87	84	16	34,493	72
Slaka 4, Lambohov S	1,929	1,387	58.9	39.2	78	67	33	26,925	51
Slaka 5, Lambohov N	1,763	1,248	63.9	33.9	72	61	39	23,972	56
Stjärnorp	835	679	46.5	51.6	89	93	7	27,941	46
Törnevalla Ö-Skrukeby	2,108	1,538	40.0	59.1	89	93	7	29,687	49
Ulrika	431	338	37.7	61.2	78	94	6	21,935	26
Vikingstad S	2,141	1,544	42.8	56.3	90	90	10	31,123	51
Vist 1, Sturefors S	1,702	1,253	51.1	48.2	91	94	6	31,925	54
Vist 2, Sturefors N	2,272	1,537	46.6	52.8	91	91	9	29,594	57
Vreta Kloster 1, Berg	1,908	1,478	39.3	59.4	90	94	6	33,486	63
Vreta Kloster 2, N	1,890	1,412	49.9	48.4	86	92	8	29,184	50
Vreta Kloster 3, Ö	1,683	1,261	47.1	51.9	85	90	10	29,344	54
Vreta Kloster 4, S	1,835	1,311	51.2	47.9	89	91	9	30,732	50
Vreta Kloster 5, V	1,388	1,148	49.2	49.9	84	90	10	26,299	44
Vårdnäs	1,976	1,566	46.6	53.1	88	95	5	30,408	54
Vårdsberg	2,426	1,712	44.5	54.2	90	92	8	30,537	56
Västerlösa-Björkeberg	993	750	35.3	63.3	89	92	8	30,645	41
Örtomta-Askeby	1,384	1,029	40.6	59.0	88	93	7	29,533	50
Ö Harg-Rystad 1	1,064	798	37.2	61.3	89	92	8	30,833	44
Source: SVT

== Politics ==
=== Municipal election 2018 ===
On September 9, 2018, Linköping held Municipality Election:

Party	Votes	%	Seats	±
Social Democrats	29137	27.57	22	-5
Moderate Party	23050	21.81	18	-2
Sweden Democrats	11130	10.53	8	+2
Centre Party	9865	9.33	8	+2
Left Party	6459	6.11	5	+2
Christian Democrats	7908	7.48	6	+2
Liberals	9456	8.95	7	+1
Green Party	6904	6.53	5	-2
Others	1770	1.67	0	0
Invalid/blank votes	1254			
Total	106933	100	79	0

Following the 2014 Linköping municipal election, the seats were divided in the following way:
The governing parties		Parties in opposition	
The Social Democrats	27	The Moderate Party	20
The Liberal People's Party	6	The Left Party	3
The Green Party	7	The Sweden Democrats	6
		The Christian Democrats	4
		The Centre Party	6

Following the 2018 Linköping municipal election, the seats were divided in the following way:
The governing parties		Parties in opposition	
The Moderate Party	18	The Social Democrats	22
The Liberals	7	The Left Party	5
The Christian Democrats	6	The Green Party	5
The Centre Party	8	The Sweden Democrats	8

In the aftermath of the 2014 municipality election, The local Social Democrats (S; Social Demokraterna), Green Party (MP; Miljöpartiet) and the Liberal People's Party (L; Liberalerna, formerly FP; Folk Partiet) formed a coalition majority named "coalition for Linköping" with 40 out of 79 seats, while the minority opposition in Linköping consisted each separate by: the Moderate Party (M; Moderaterna), Centre Party (C; Center Partiet), Christian Democrats (Kristdemokraterna), Left Party (V; Vänsterpartiet) and the Sweden Democrats (SD; Sverige Demokraterna).

After the 2018 elections, all of the Alliance parties in the municipality joined and took over from the Socialdemocrat's coalition rule and their mandat started 1 January 2019 and onwards.

=== List of mayors ===
- Eva Joelsson Social Democrats (S), 1994–2006
- Ann-Cathrine Hjerdt Moderate Party (M), 2006–2014
- Helena Balthammar Social Democrats (S), 2014–2018
- Lars Vikinge Centre Party (C), 2018–present

== Notable people ==
- Fredrik Hasselquist (1722–1752), traveller and naturalist

== Twin towns – sister cities ==
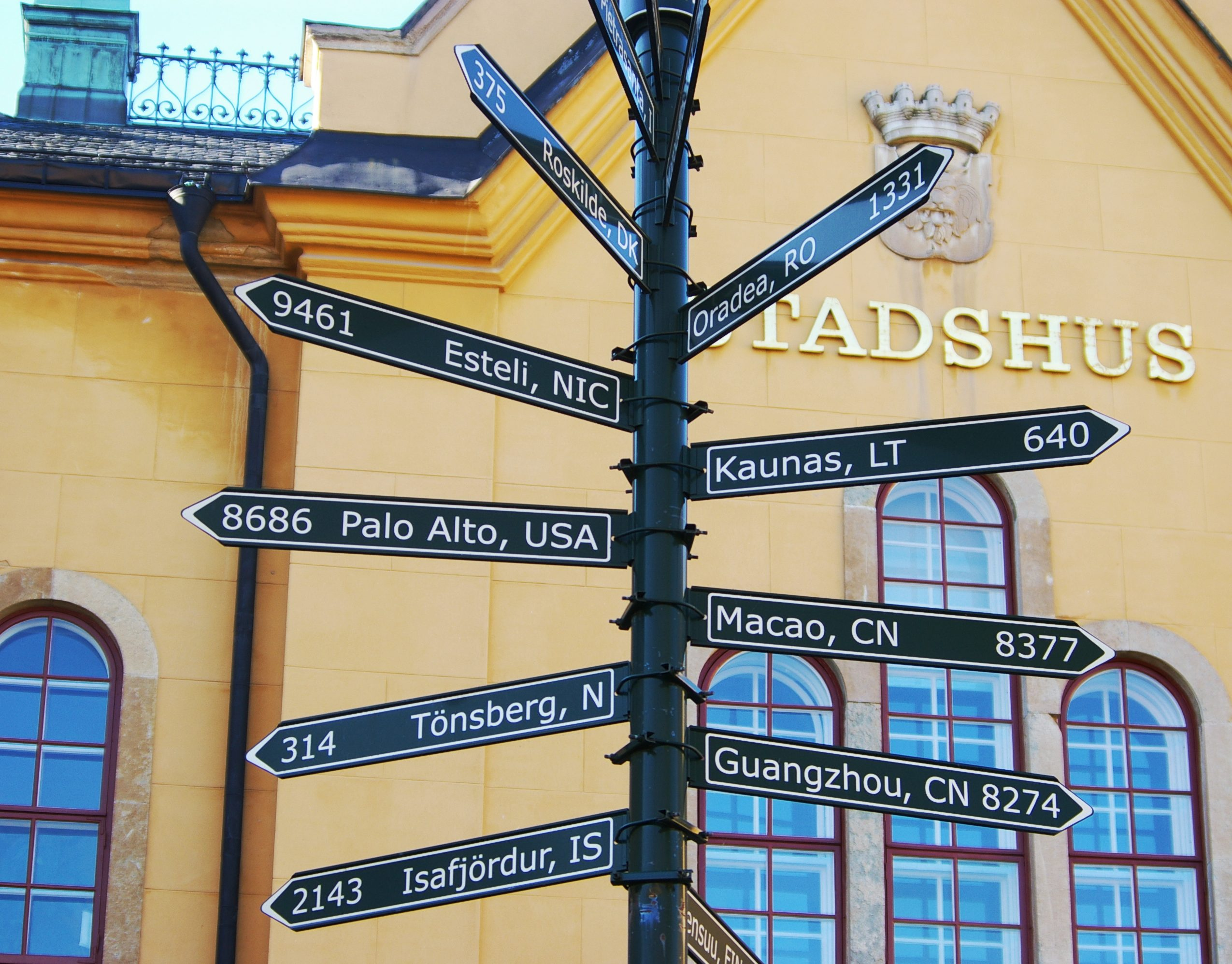
Sign post showing the municipality's twin towns

Linköping is twinned with:

- Ísafjarðarbær, Iceland
- Joensuu, Finland
- Kaunas, Lithuania
- Linz, Austria
- Macau, China
- Palo Alto, United States
- Tønsberg, Norway

Roskilde Municipality in Denmark chose in the summer of 2007 to cancel its sistership agreements with four Scandinavian local government entities, including Linköping Municipality. Twinning with Guangzhou in China terminated in February 2020.
