= Motala ström =

River in Sweden

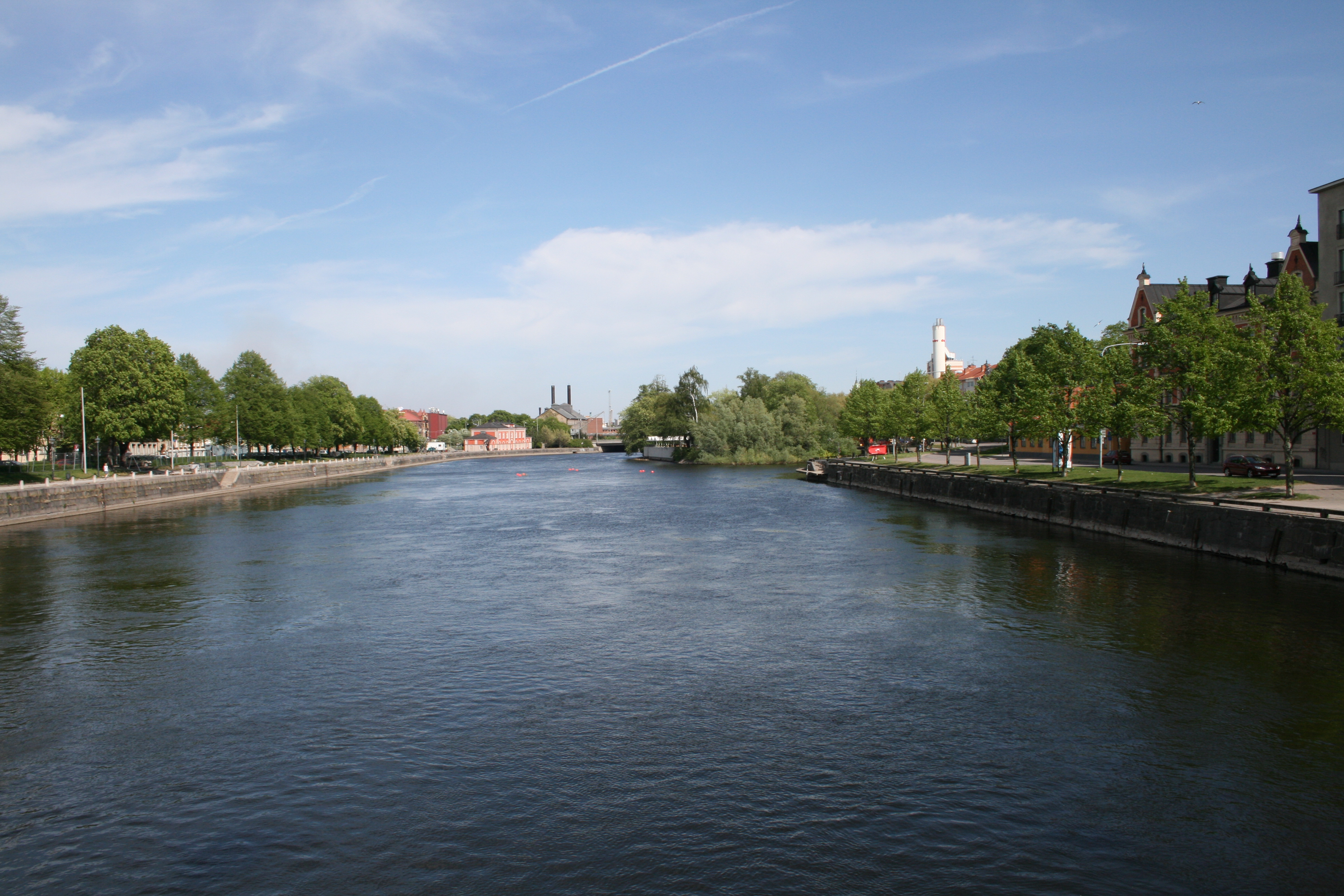
- Motala ström in May 2008

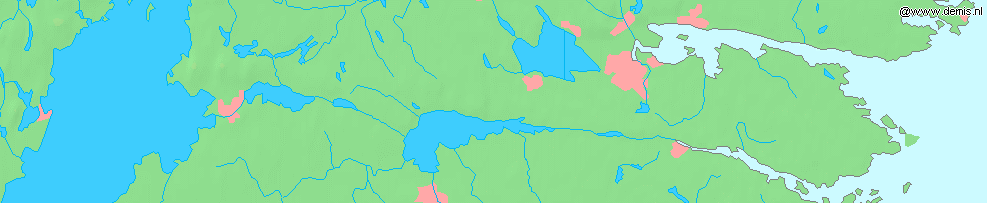
- Map showing Motala ström from lake Vättern (left) to the Baltic Sea (right)

Location
- Country: Sweden

Physical characteristics
- Source: Vättern
  - coordinates: 58°32′10″N 15°02′05″E
  - elevation: 88 m (289 ft)
- Mouth: Baltic Sea
  - coordinates: 58°37′30″N 16°15′10″E
  - elevation: 0 m (0 ft)
- Length: 100 km (62 mi)
- Basin size: 15,481.2 km^{2} (5,977.3 sq mi)
- Discharge
  - average: 100 m^{3}/s (3,500 cu ft/s)

Motala ström is the river system that drains lake Vättern, the second largest lake in Sweden, into the Baltic Sea in Norrköping. It is named from the city Motala where it begins. In the early 19th century, the Göta Canal was constructed in parallel with Motala ström.
