= Söderköping Municipality =

Söderköping Municipality Söderköpings kommun
- Municipality
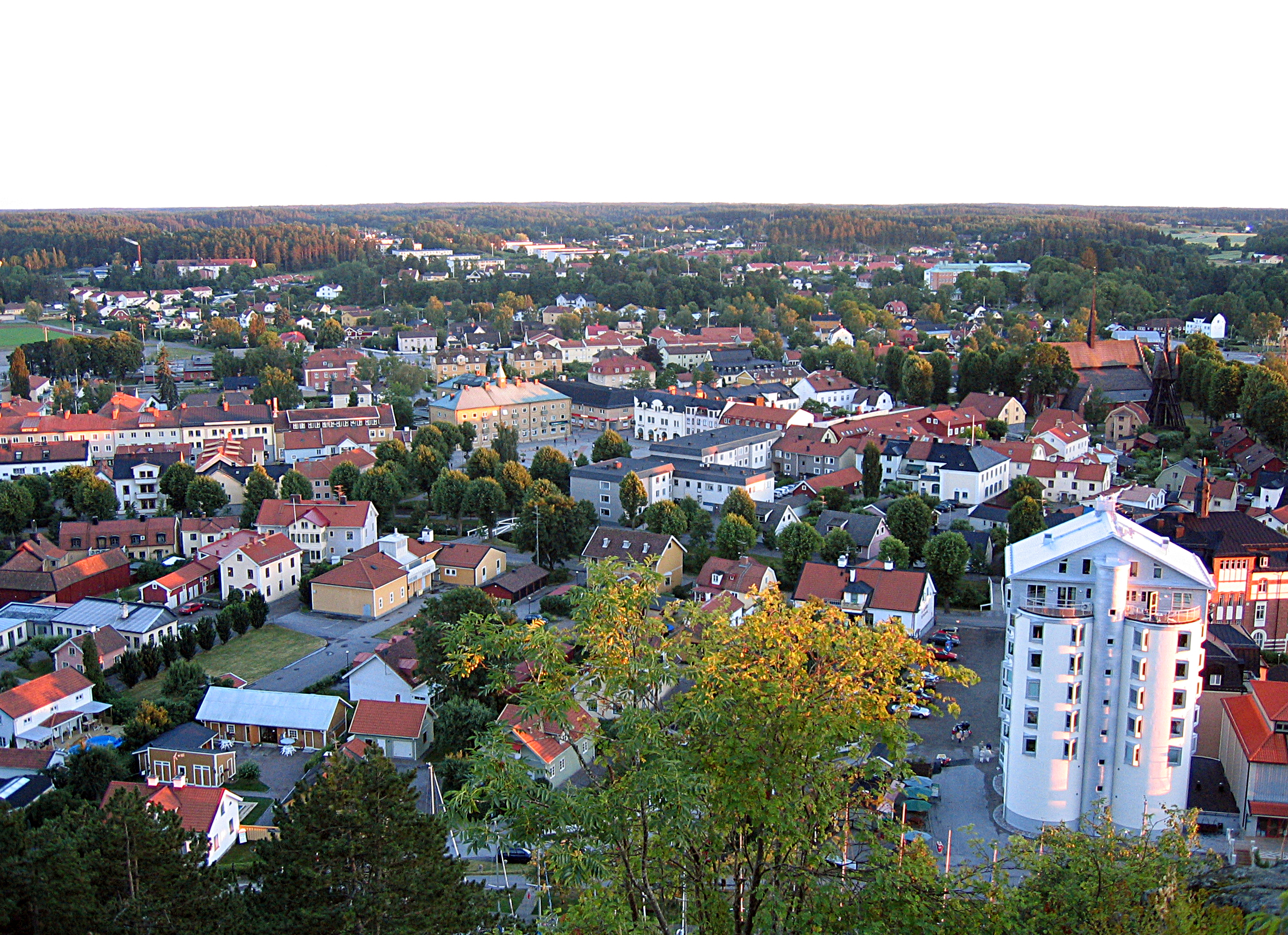

- Coat of arms

- Coordinates: 58°29′N 16°19′E
- Country: Sweden
- County: Östergötland County
- Seat: Söderköping

Area
  - Total: 1,325.18 km^{2} (511.65 sq mi)
  - Land: 673.85 km^{2} (260.17 sq mi)
  - Water: 651.33 km^{2} (251.48 sq mi)
- Area as of 1 January 2014.

Population (30 June 2025)
  - Total: 14,821
  - Density: 21.995/km^{2} (56.966/sq mi)
- Time zone: UTC+1 (CET)
  - Summer (DST): UTC+2 (CEST)
- ISO 3166 code: SE
- Province: Östergötland
- Municipal code: 0582
- Website: www.soderkoping.se

Söderköping Municipality (Swedish: Söderköpings kommun) is a municipality in Östergötland County in southeast Sweden. Its seat is located in the city of Söderköping.

The present municipality was created in 1971-1973 when the former City of Söderköping in two steps was amalgamated with three surrounding rural municipalities.

== Demographics ==
This is a demographic table based on Söderköping Municipality's electoral districts in the 2022 Swedish general election sourced from SVT's election platform, in turn taken from SCB official statistics.

In total there were 11,419 Swedish citizens of voting age resident in the municipality. 39.3% voted for the left coalition and 59.6% for the right coalition. Indicators are in percentage points except population totals and income.

Location	Residents	Citizen adults	Left vote	Right vote	Employed	Swedish parents	Foreign heritage	Income SEK	Degree
Location			%	%					
Alboga	1,626	1,167	43.9	55.0	79	85	15	24,399	33
Bossgård	1,850	1,462	44.7	54.1	78	90	10	22,949	36
Drothem	2,183	1,666	39.7	59.5	89	93	7	29,811	46
S:t Laurentii	1,742	1,439	41.3	57.0	81	89	11	25,086	38
Sankt Anna-Börrum	781	715	37.0	62.0	80	95	5	24,053	32
Skällvik-Mogata	1,471	1,170	33.7	65.4	87	93	7	27,171	34
Skönberga	1,885	1,471	38.6	60.3	81	90	10	24,385	30
V Husby-Gårdeby	2,064	1,527	35.6	63.2	87	94	6	29,020	38
Östra Ryd	1,064	802	38.3	61.3	87	94	6	26,170	35
Source: SVT

== Elections ==
=== Riksdag ===
These are the results of the Riksdag elections of Söderköping Municipality since the 1972 municipality reform. The results of the Sweden Democrats were not published by SCB between 1988 and 1998 at a municipal level to the party's small nationwide size at the time. "Turnout" denotes the percentage of the electorate casting a ballot, whereas "Votes" only denotes valid votes.

Year	Turnout	Votes	V	S	MP	C	L	KD	M	SD	ND
1973	92.3	6,457	2.1	35.4	0.0	38.0	6.0	3.0	15.3	0.0	0.0
1976	92.6	6,954	1.7	33.2	0.0	37.4	8.3	1.9	17.3	0.0	0.0
1979	91.6	7,272	2.6	33.9	0.0	31.4	7.6	1.8	22.0	0.0	0.0
1982	92.1	7,749	3.0	36.6	1.5	27.2	4.4	2.0	25.3	0.0	0.0
1985	90.4	7,978	2.5	36.4	2.1	23.7	11.8	0.0	23.5	0.0	0.0
1988	86.3	7,933	3.1	36.3	6.9	21.7	9.8	3.3	18.9	0.0	0.0
1991	87.7	8,455	2.6	30.1	3.7	15.6	6.7	8.3	23.1	0.0	8.7
1994	87.5	8,711	3.8	38.7	5.9	13.9	4.7	4.5	25.6	0.0	1.8
1998	83.1	8,362	8.9	31.6	5.1	6.3	3.7	15.4	26.3	0.0	0.0
2002	82.1	8,514	5.7	35.3	5.3	10.4	10.2	11.4	19.0	1.3	0.0
2006	84.1	8,890	4.4	30.9	5.3	11.7	5.3	7.6	28.6	2.7	0.0
2010	85.8	9,336	4.2	26.2	7.1	10.0	5.9	6.6	33.7	5.0	0.0
2014	88.3	9,826	3.8	27.0	5.8	8.7	4.3	5.0	26.0	16.5	0.0

Blocs

This lists the relative strength of the socialist and centre-right blocs since 1973, but parties not elected to the Riksdag are inserted as "other", including the Sweden Democrats results from 1988 to 2006, but also the Christian Democrats pre-1991 and the Greens in 1982, 1985 and 1991. The sources are identical to the table above. The coalition or government mandate marked in bold formed the government after the election. New Democracy got elected in 1991 but are still listed as "other" due to the short lifespan of the party. "Elected" is the total number of percentage points from the municipality that went to parties who were elected to the Riksdag.

Year	Turnout	Votes	Left	Right	SD	Other	Elected
1973	92.3	6,457	**37.5**	59.3	0.0	3.2	96.8
1976	92.6	6,954	34.9	**63.0**	0.0	2.1	97.9
1979	91.6	7,272	36.5	**61.0**	0.0	2.5	97.5
1982	92.1	7,749	**39.6**	57.1	0.0	3.3	96.7
1985	90.4	7,978	**38.9**	59.0	0.0	2.1	97.9
1988	86.3	7,933	**46.3**	50.4	0.0	3.3	96.7
1991	87.7	8,455	32.7	**53.7**	0.0	13.6	95.1
1994	87.5	8,711	**48.4**	48.7	0.0	2.9	97.1
1998	83.1	8,362	**45.6**	51.7	0.0	2.7	97.3
2002	82.1	8,514	**46.3**	51.0	0.0	2.7	97.3
2006	84.1	8,890	40.6	**53.2**	0.0	6.2	93.8
2010	85.8	9,336	37.5	**56.2**	5.0	1.3	98.7
2014	88.3	9,826	**36.6**	44.0	16.5	2.9	97.1
2018	88.1	9,855	**48.5**	35.0	14.0	2.4	97.6

== Gallery ==
Images from the city of Söderköping:

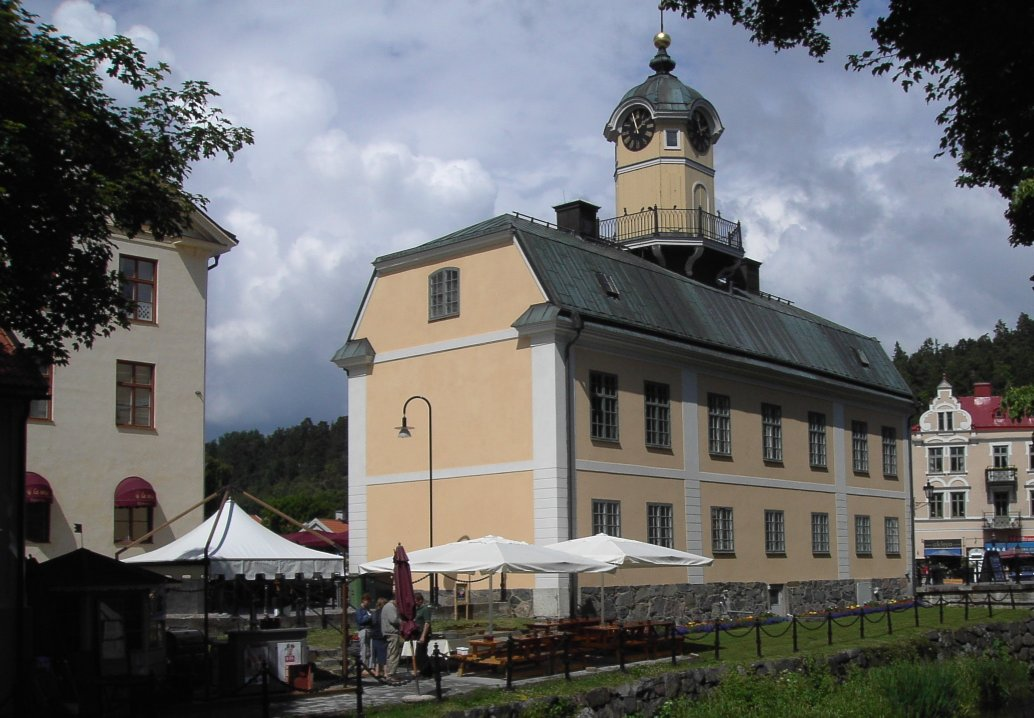
Söderköping Town Hall

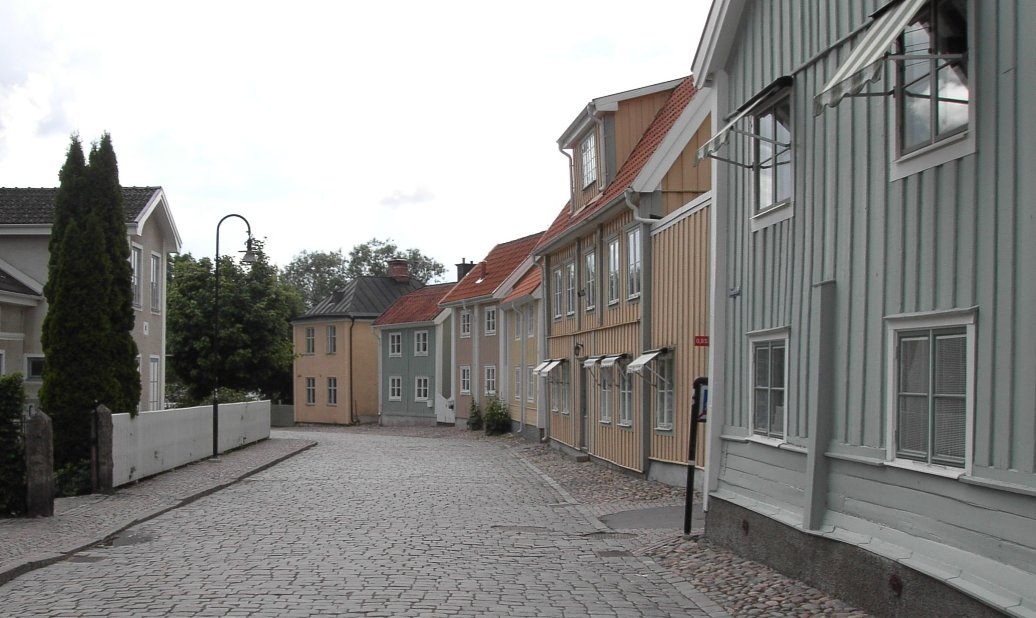
Munkebro Street, Söderköping

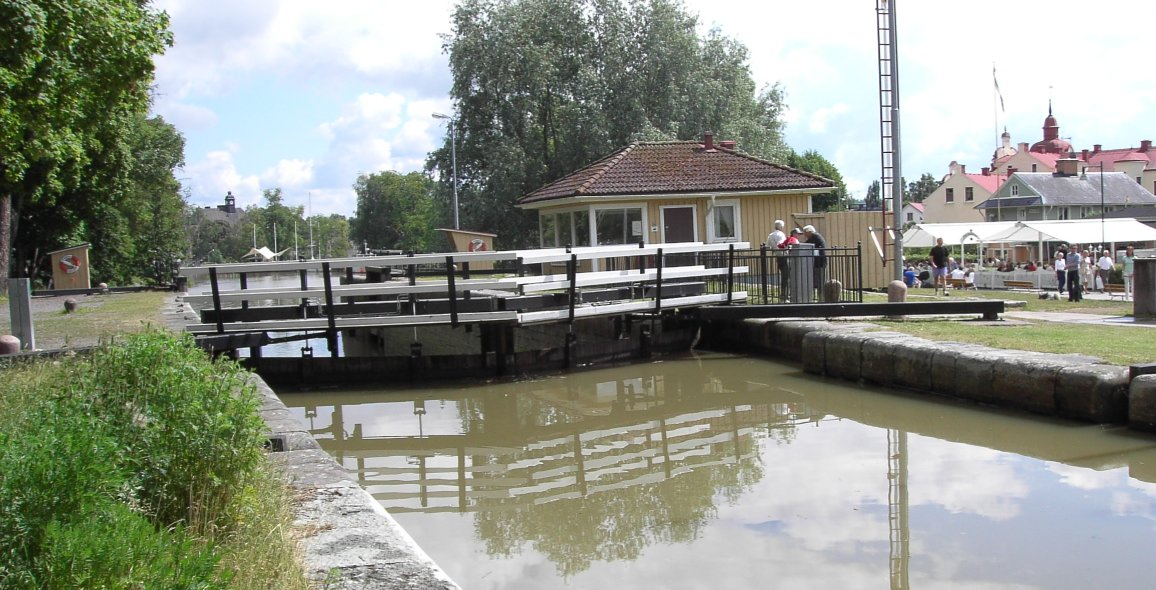
Söderköping lock on the Göta Canal

== See also ==
- Köping (concept)
