= Östergötland County =

County (län) of Sweden

Östergötland County Östergötlands län (Swedish)
- County
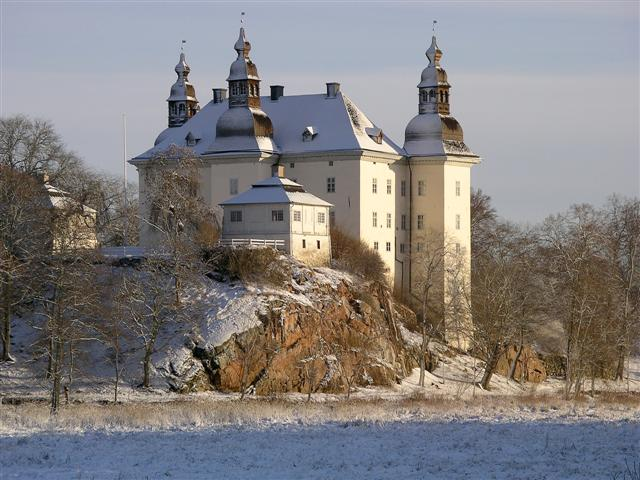

- Flag Coat of arms

- Location map of Östergötland County in Sweden

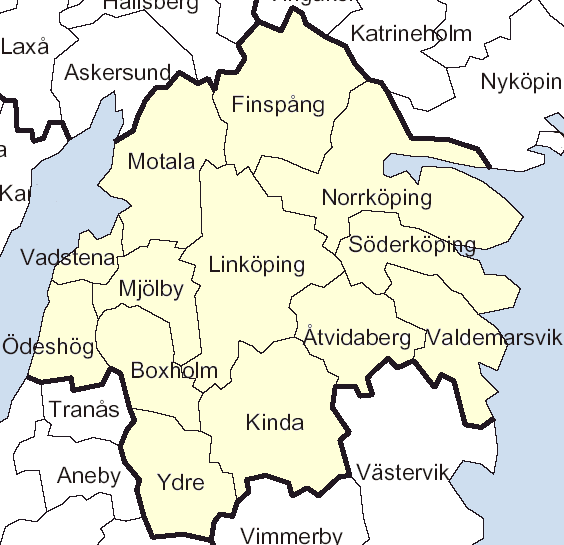
- Map of Östergötland County
- Coordinates: 58°24′38″N 15°36′49″E
- Country: Sweden
- Founded: 1634
- Capital: Linköping
- Municipalities: 13: Åtvidaberg; Boxholm; Finspång; Kinda; Linköping; Mjölby; Motala; Norrköping; Ödeshög; Söderköping; Vadstena; Valdemarsvik; Ydre

Government
  - Governor: Carl Fredrik Graf (Moderate Party)
  - Council: Region Östergötland

Area
  - Total: 10,602 km^{2} (4,093 sq mi)

Population (31 December 2023)
  - Total: 472,298
  - Density: 44.548/km^{2} (115.38/sq mi)

GDP
  - Total: SEK 167 billion €17.800 billion (2015)
- Time zone: UTC+1 (CET)
  - Summer (DST): UTC+2 (CEST)
- ISO 3166 code: SE-E
- NUTS Region: SE123
- Website: www.e.lst.se

Östergötland County (Swedish: Östergötlands län, pronounced [ˈœsːtɛrˌjøːtlands lɛːn]) is a county or län in southeastern Sweden. It has land borders with the counties of Kalmar to the southeast, Jönköping to the southwest, Örebro to the northwest, and Södermanland to the northeast. It also has a sea border with Västra Götaland to the west (across lake Vättern), and borders the Baltic Sea to the east.

Östergötland County has a population of 456,550 (September 30, 2017) and the capital and biggest city is Linköping. Linköping and neighbouring twin city Norrköping together form one of Sweden's metropolitan areas; The Linköping-Norrköping Corridor is therefore sometimes marketed as The Fourth Metropolitan Region of Sweden, the other three being Stockholm, Gothenburg and Malmö. Princess Estelle is Duchess of Östergötland.

== Province ==
For History, Geography and Culture see: Östergötland.

Östergötland has virtually the same boundaries as the current administrative entity, the Östergötland County.

== Administration ==
The main aim of the County Administrative Board is to fulfil the goals set in national politics by the Riksdag and the Government, to coordinate the interests of the county, to promote the development of the county, to establish regional goals and safeguard the due process of law in the handling of each case. The County Administrative Board is a Government Agency headed by a Governor. See List of Östergötland Governors.

=== Municipalities ===
The county is divided into 13 municipalities:

- Boxholm
- Finspång
- Kinda
- Linköping
- Mjölby
- Motala
- Norrköping
- Söderköping
- Vadstena
- Valdemarsvik
- Ydre
- Åtvidaberg
- Ödeshög

== Politics ==
The County Council of Östergötland or Landstinget i Östergötland.

== Riksdag elections ==
The table details all Riksdag election results of Östergötland County since the unicameral era began in 1970. The blocs denote which party would support the Prime Minister or the lead opposition party towards the end of the elected parliament.

| Year | Turnout | Votes | V | S | MP | C | L | KD | M | SD | NyD | Left | Right |
|---|---|---|---|---|---|---|---|---|---|---|---|---|---|
| 1970 | 89.1 | 239,956 | 3.6 | 49.5 | | 19.4 | 13.5 | 2.5 | 11.2 | | | 53.1 | 44.1 |
| 1973 | 91.2 | 247,375 | 4.0 | 47.3 | | 24.5 | 7.2 | 2.6 | 13.9 | | | 51.3 | 45.6 |
| 1976 | 92.3 | 260,602 | 3.5 | 46.2 | | 23.3 | 9.4 | 2.0 | 15.3 | | | 49.7 | 48.0 |
| 1979 | 91.2 | 261,160 | 4.5 | 46.6 | | 17.2 | 9.4 | 1.9 | 19.8 | | | 51.1 | 46.3 |
| 1982 | 92.0 | 265,147 | 5.1 | 48.4 | 1.4 | 15.0 | 4.7 | 2.5 | 22.9 | | | 53.0 | 43.0 |
| 1985 | 90.6 | 266,559 | 4.4 | 47.5 | | 13.0 | 12.9 | | 20.6 | | | 51.9 | 46.5 |
| 1988 | 86.5 | 256,735 | 5.1 | 45.6 | 5.2 | 11.8 | 10.9 | 3.6 | 17.5 | | | 55.9 | 40.2 |
| 1991 | 87.3 | 261,387 | 4.0 | 38.8 | 3.0 | 8.3 | 8.3 | 8.8 | 21.1 | | 6.6 | 42.8 | 46.6 |
| 1994 | 87.7 | 266,456 | 5.5 | 46.1 | 5.1 | 7.7 | 6.7 | 4.8 | 21.7 | | 1.4 | 56.6 | 40.8 |
| 1998 | 82.4 | 249,757 | 11.1 | 37.2 | 4.8 | 5.1 | 3.8 | 13.1 | 22.0 | | | 53.1 | 44.1 |
| 2002 | 81.1 | 250,926 | 7.3 | 42.2 | 4.8 | 6.1 | 11.8 | 10.3 | 14.7 | 0.9 | | 54.3 | 42.9 |
| 2006 | 83.4 | 262,168 | 5.2 | 37.4 | 5.1 | 7.6 | 6.5 | 7.2 | 24.8 | 2.3 | | 47.7 | 46.1 |
| 2010 | 85.8 | 279,741 | 5.1 | 33.0 | 7.6 | 6.3 | 6.8 | 5.9 | 28.7 | 5.3 | | 45.6 | 47.6 |
| 2014 | 87.0 | 291,484 | 4.8 | 32.6 | 6.6 | 6.0 | 5.1 | 5.1 | 22.3 | 14.4 | | 44.0 | 38.4 |
| 2018 | 88.2 | 300,778 | 6.8 | 29.1 | 4.2 | 8.4 | 5.4 | 6.7 | 20.4 | 17.6 | | 48.4 | 50.0 |
| 2022 | 85.3 | 303,906 | 5.6 | 30.6 | 4.6 | 6.5 | 4.4 | 6.0 | 19.8 | 21.2 | | 47.3 | 51.4 |

== Demographics ==
=== Foreign background ===
SCB have collected statistics on backgrounds of residents since 2002. These tables consist of all who have two foreign-born parents or are born abroad themselves. The chart lists election years and the last year on record alone.

| Location | 2002 | 2006 | 2010 | 2014 | 2018 | 2019 |
|---|---|---|---|---|---|---|
| Boxholm | 4.1 | 5.2 | 6.1 | 8.4 | 11.3 | 11.6 |
| Finspång | 12.0 | 13.0 | 13.5 | 15.9 | 19.1 | 19.9 |
| Kinda | 4.2 | 5.2 | 6.0 | 9.0 | 10.5 | 10.7 |
| Linköping | 11.7 | 13.6 | 17.2 | 19.2 | 22.4 | 23.1 |
| Mjölby | 6.7 | 7.4 | 8.7 | 10.5 | 14.0 | 14.7 |
| Motala | 11.5 | 12.4 | 13.4 | 15.8 | 19.2 | 19.5 |
| Norrköping | 16.5 | 18.0 | 20.4 | 23.1 | 26.7 | 27.3 |
| Söderköping | 5.7 | 5.8 | 6.2 | 6.7 | 8.6 | 8.9 |
| Vadstena | 6.2 | 7.1 | 7.9 | 8.9 | 10.8 | 10.5 |
| Valdemarsvik | 4.9 | 5.8 | 7.5 | 9.2 | 15.1 | 14.7 |
| Ydre | 5.0 | 6.0 | 7.3 | 9.9 | 11.9 | 11.6 |
| Åtvidaberg | 4.9 | 5.2 | 5.8 | 7.3 | 9.2 | 9.4 |
| Ödeshög | 5.3 | 6.4 | 8.0 | 10.5 | 14.4 | 14.2 |
| Total | 11.8 | 13.2 | 15.5 | 17.8 | 21.1 | 21.7 |
Source: SCB

== Heraldry ==
Östergötland County inherited its coat of arms from the province of Östergötland. When it is shown with a royal crown it represents the County Administrative Board.

== See also ==
- Dukes of Östergötland, a title for members of the royal family
