= Östergötland =

Historical province of Sweden

- Historical province
- Coat of arms

- Coordinates: 58°24′57″N 15°37′31″E
- Country: Sweden
- Land: Götaland
- Counties: Östergötland County; Örebro County

Area
  - Total: 9,979 km^{2} (3,853 sq mi)

Population (31 December 2023)
  - Total: 469,872
  - Density: 47.09/km^{2} (122.0/sq mi)

Ethnicity
  - Language: Swedish
  - Dialect: Östgötska; Götamål

Culture
  - Flower: Cornflower
  - Animal: —
  - Bird: Mute swan
  - Fish: Pike
- Time zone: UTC+1 (CET)
  - Summer (DST): UTC+2 (CEST)

Östergötland (Swedish pronunciation: [ˈœ̂sːtɛrˌjøːtland]; English exonym: East Gothland) is one of the traditional provinces of Sweden (landskap in Swedish) in the south of Sweden. It borders Småland, Västergötland, Närke, Södermanland and the Baltic Sea. In older English literature, the Latinized version Ostrogothia is also used. The corresponding administrative county, Östergötland County, covers the entire province and parts of neighbouring provinces.

== Heraldry ==
From 1560, Östergötland was represented with two separate coats-of-arms seals until 1884, when the current one was granted. The coat of arms is represented with a ducal coronet. Blazon: "gules a griffin with dragon wings, tail and tongue rampant or armed, beaked, langued and membered azure between four roses argent."

== Geography ==
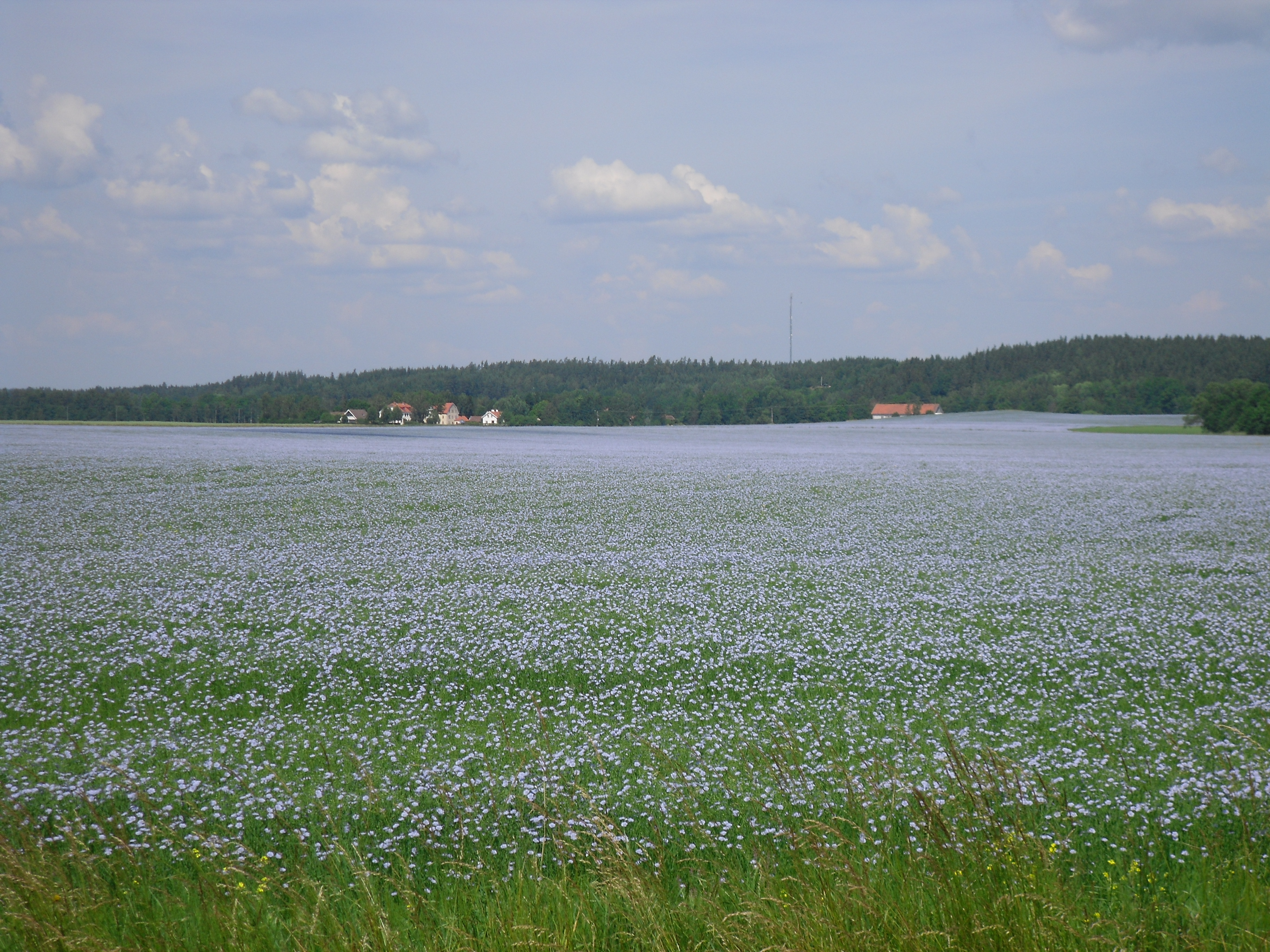
Typical Östgöta plains

From west to east, in the middle parts, extends the Östgöta Plain (Östgötaslätten). It is largely agricultural. In the southern part of the province, the terrain becomes marked by the south Swedish highlands, with hills and countless lakes. The northern parts are also hilly, and are otherwise dominated by forests.

Outside the eastern shore of Östergötland lies the Östergötland archipelago, the islands and islets of which cover an area of 118 km^{2} (46 sq mi). The Bråviken bay continues further into the country. Some of the more notable islands are Korsö, Gränsö, Arkö, Djursö, Yxnö, Finnö, Emtö, Fångö and Stora Ålö.

Traditionally, the region is divided into two halves, east and west of the river Stångån (Östanstång and Västanstång respectively), which flows from the south into Lake Roxen at Linköping.

The eastern part of Göta Canal traverses the province from the Baltic Sea at Mem to Lake Vättern at Motala.

- Highest mountain: Stenabohöjden, 327 meters (1,073 ft)
- Largest lake: Vättern (second-largest lake of Sweden)

=== Towns ===
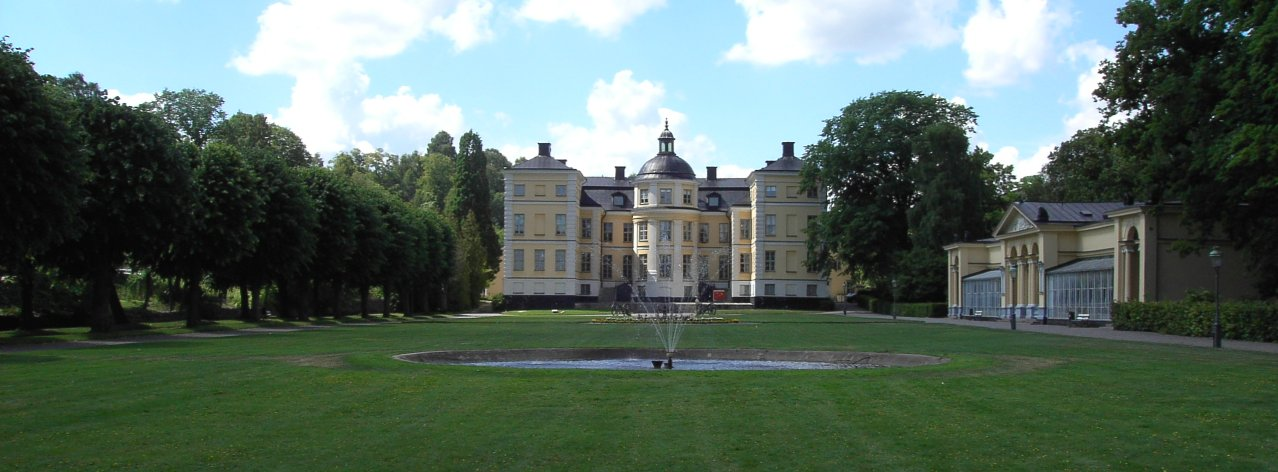
The Palace in Finspång

Cities and the year of their now defunct royal charter.

- Linköping (1287)
- Mjölby (1922)
- Motala (1881)
- Norrköping (1384)
- Skänninge (approximately 1200)
- Söderköping (approximately 1200)
- Vadstena (approximately 1400)

Today, the largest city in the province is Linköping, with Norrköping second. Skänninge is one of the oldest areas but small; Vadstena is also small. Additional towns without a royal charter that have emerged in the 20th century are Finspång and Åtvidaberg.

== History ==
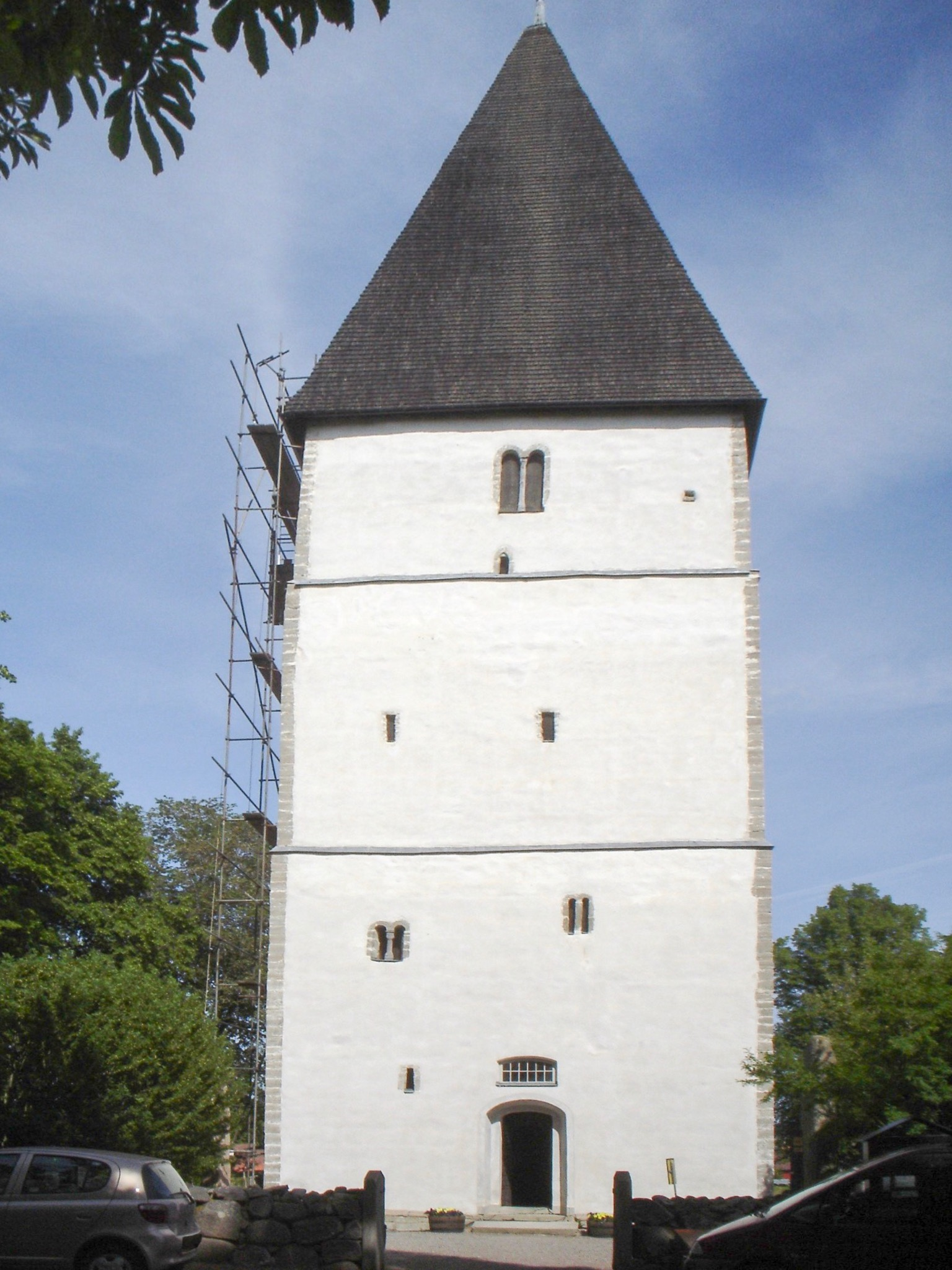
The church tower at Bjälbo

The earliest mention of Östergötland (the Ostrogoths of Scandza) appears in the Getica by the Goth scholar Jordanes.

The traditions of Östergötland date back into the Viking Age, the undocumented Iron Age, and earlier, when this region had its own laws and kings (see Geatish kings and Wulfings). It is said that the famous Viking warrior Beowulf may likely have been from what is now the Östergötland region. The region kept its own laws, the Östgötalagen, into the Middle Ages. Östergötland belonged to the Christian heartland of the late Iron Age and early medieval Sweden. The Sverker and Bjälbo dynasties played pivotal roles in the consolidation of Sweden.

The province has about 50,000 ancient remains of different kinds. Some 1,749 are, for instance, grave fields.

Industry was formerly most significant in the cities of Norrköping (industries include Ericsson), Linköping (where SAAB has aircraft factories where the Gripen fighter is produced), Finspång (metal works), and Motala (mechanical industries).

Since the 13th century, Swedish princes and princesses in some dynasties have been created dukes and duchesses of various provinces. Since 1772, these are only honorary titles. There have been several Dukes and Duchesses of Östergötland. The current duchess is Princess Estelle since her birth in 2012. Local lore from Lake Sommen in southern Östergötland tells that a cow-beast called Urkon or Sommakoa will kill any crowned king that visits the district of Ydre. It was said that the Urkon killed legendary king Frode. As Frode was passing through Ydre, Urkon escaped its lake-cave and attacked him. Frode fled Ydre and thought he was safe but the beast caught and slew him.

== Culture ==
=== Local accents ===
Formerly the östgöta or dialect spectrum were considered true göta dialects, but is nowadays considered being a transition area between true göta dialects and svea dialects. The dialects are still used in rural areas, but in the cities, the Standard Swedish is spoken with a certain Östgöta accent.

The accent Östgötska can be distinguished from Standard Swedish just by accent and pronunciation of vowels and sje- and the- sounds, which makes Östgöta accent an eastern variety of the Götaland accent. In some parts bordering to Södermanland, a variety of the Svealand accent is spoken.

=== Sights ===
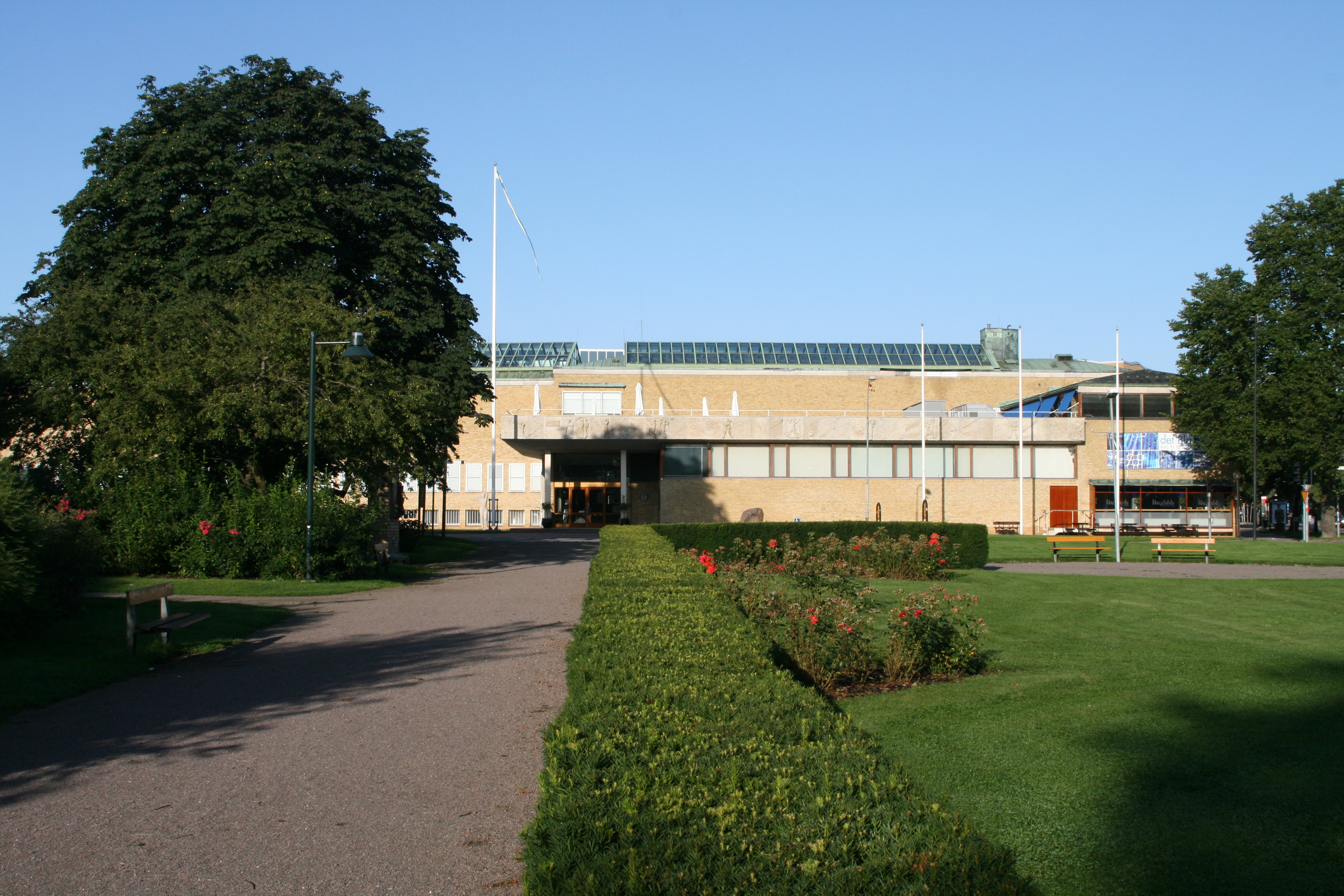
The Provincial Museum in Linköping

In Östergötland several older churches are still standing and many castles and palaces are open to the public. Ekenäs Castle, one of the best preserved renaissance castles in Sweden, has belonged to the families Sture and Banér. Löfstad Castle has its origin in the early 17th century, having belonged to the von Fersen family. Vadstena Castle, built by the Royal Vasa dynasty 1545–1620, is a combined fortress and renaissance castle.

Vreta Abbey was the first convent to be established in Sweden, dating from the early 12th century, while Vadstena Abbey was the dominant convent in Medieval Sweden. Notable is also the ruins of the Alvastra Abbey near mountain Omberg and Lake Tåkern.

The cathedral in Linköping is the second largest church in Sweden and is very well preserved from the Middle Age.

The Göta Canal crosses the province East-West with several locks and the Kinda Canal connects the lakes in the southern parts of the province with the central plains.

Övralid Manor was the last home of Nobel Prize laureate Verner von Heidenstam 1925–40.

There are several museums in all parts of the province, for example the Swedish Broadcasting Museum, the open-air museum Old Linköping, Swedish Air Force Museum, Sancta Birgitta Convent Museum, Museum of Work and the Motala Motor Museum.

The Rök runestone is one of the most famous runestones, featuring the longest known runic inscription in stone. It can now be seen by the church in Rök (between Mjölby and Ödeshög, close to the E4 and Lake Vättern). It is considered the first piece of written Swedish and thus marks the beginning of the history of Swedish literature.

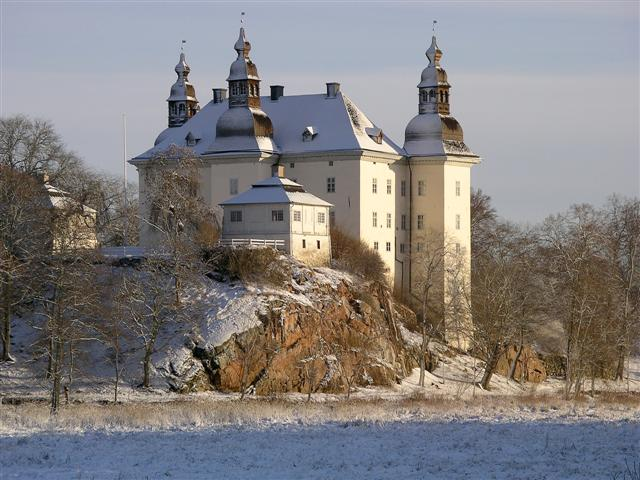
Winter scene at Ekenäs Castle

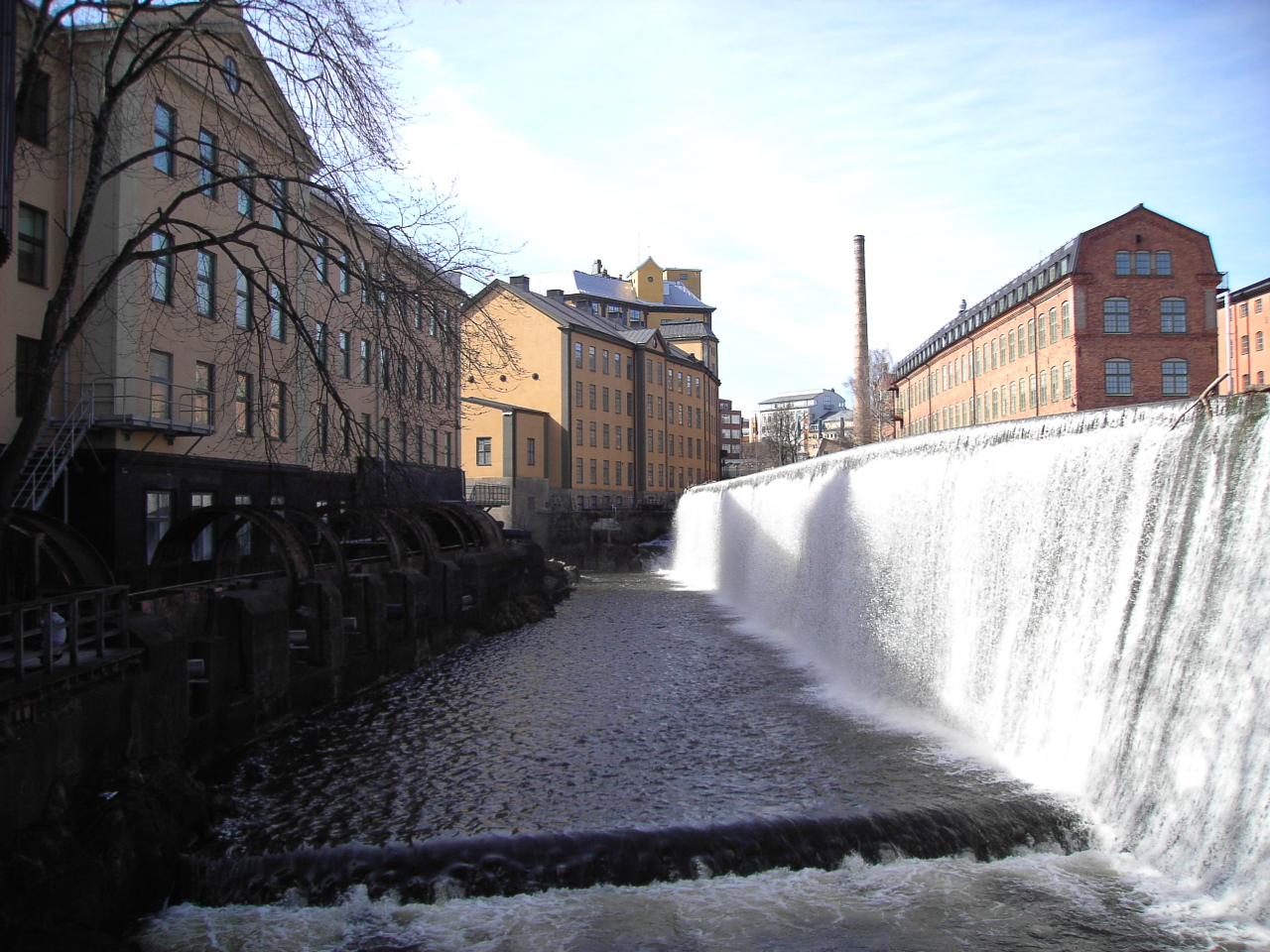
Former Industrial landscape in Norrköping

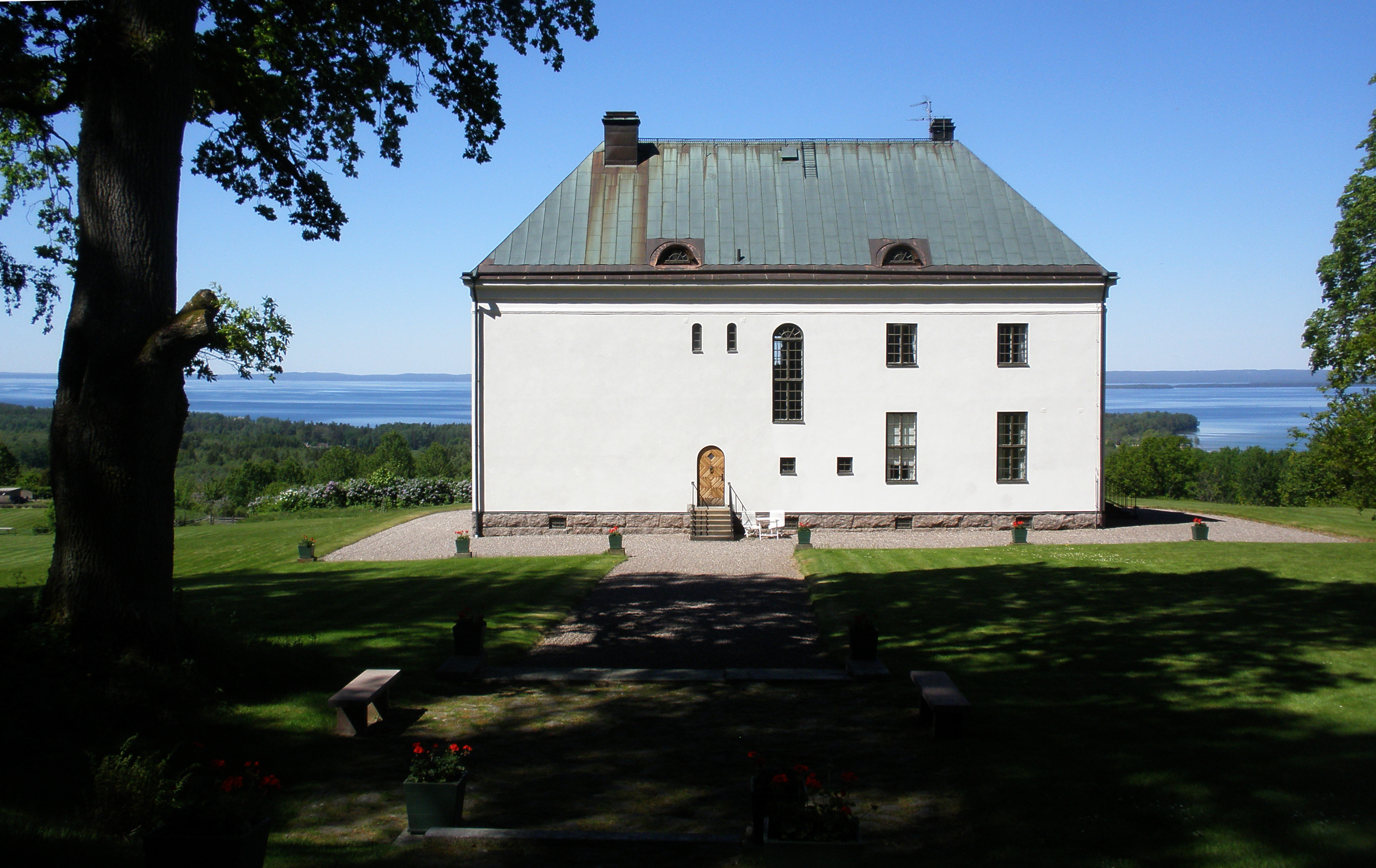
Övralid Manor, with view over Lake Vättern

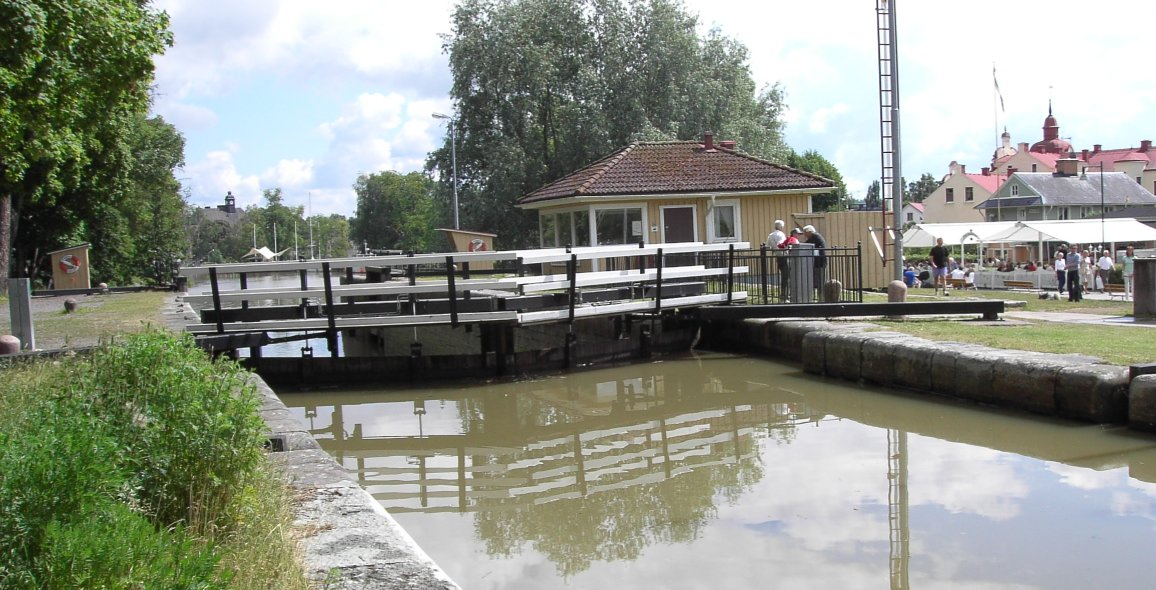
The Göta Canal at Söderköping

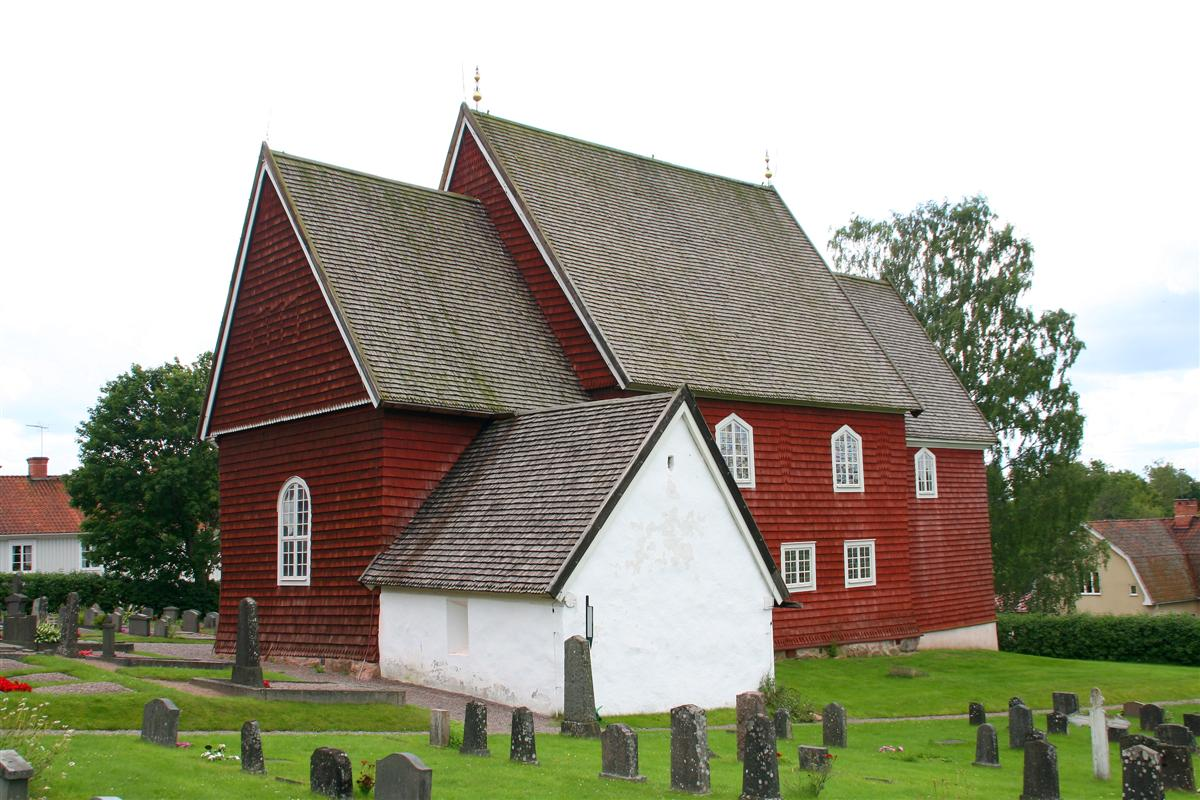
Tidersrum Church, the oldest wooden church in Sweden

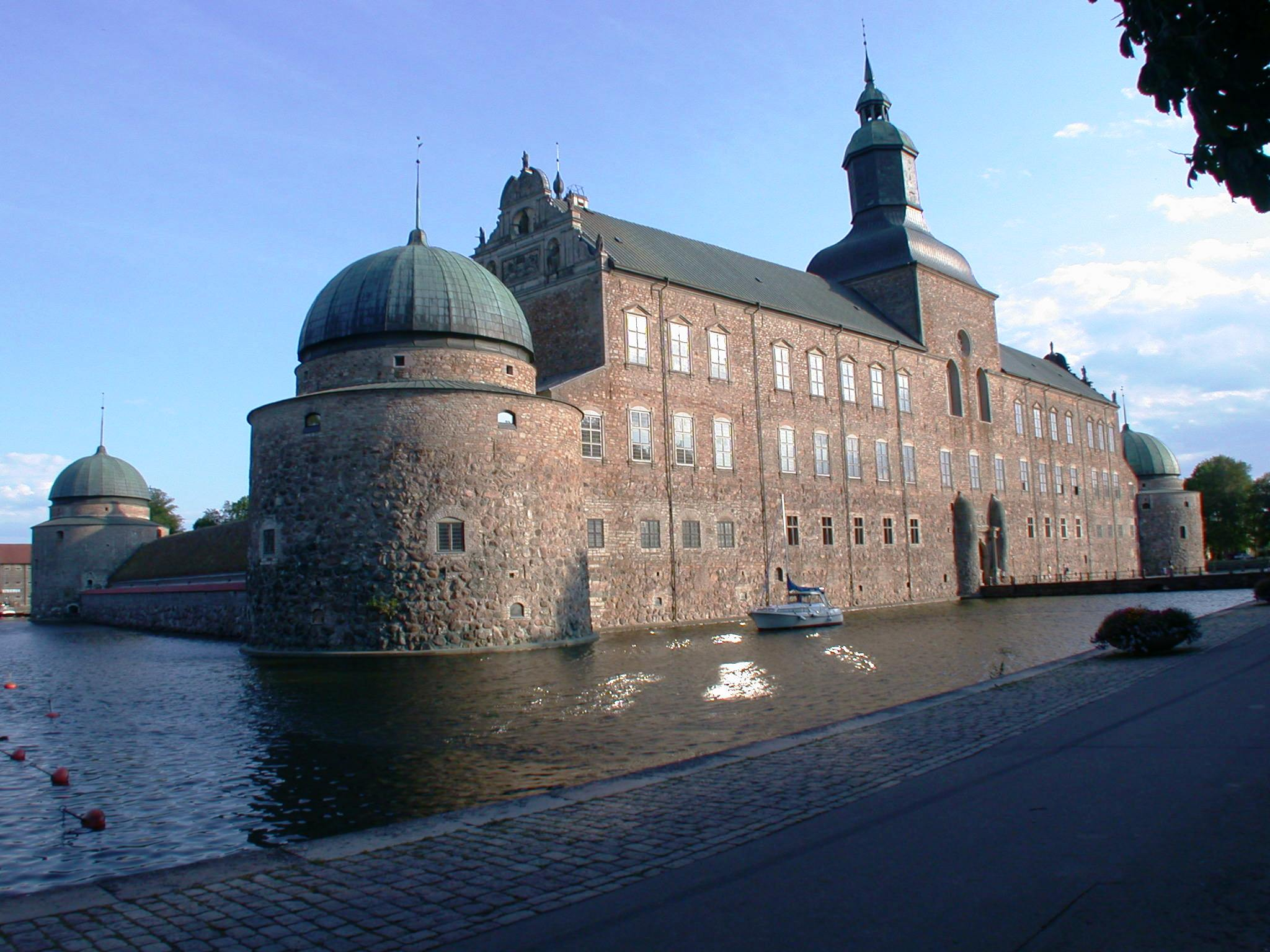
Vadstena Castle in Vadstena

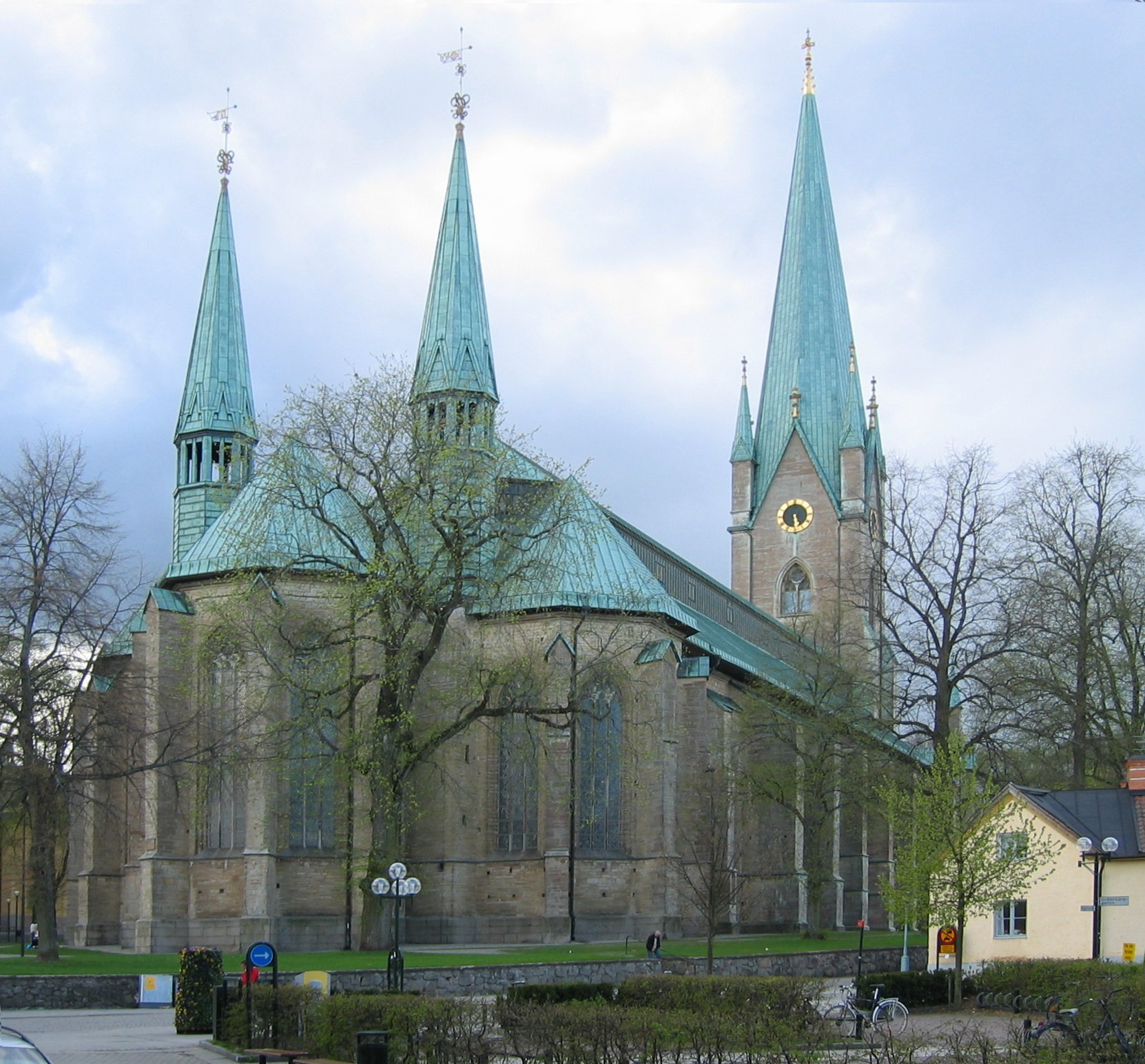
The Cathedral in Linköping

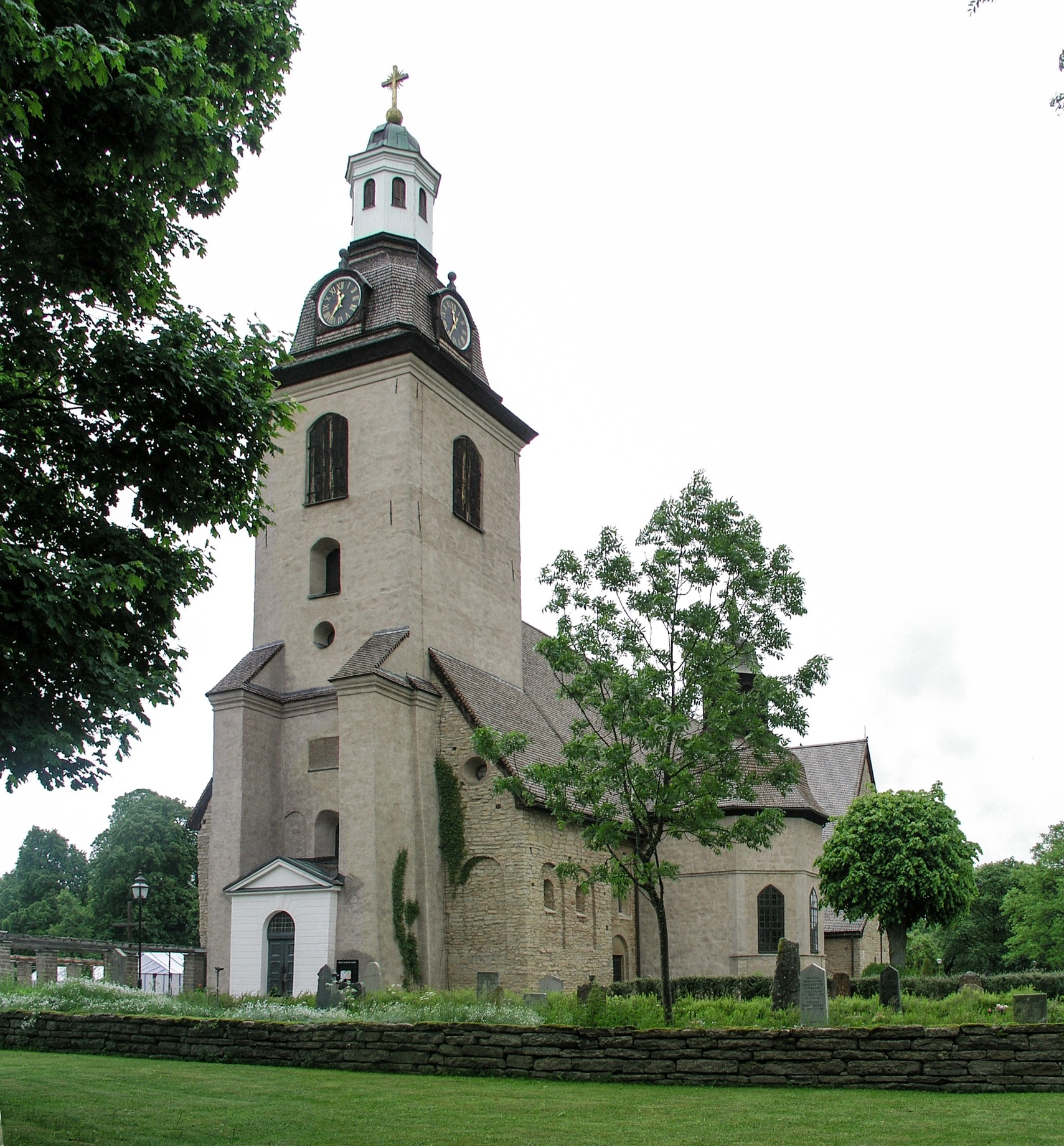
Vreta Abbey from the early 12th century

== Hundreds ==
The Hundreds of Sweden were jurisdictional divisions in effect until the early 20th century.

- Aska
- Bankekind
- Boberg
- Bråbo
- Dal
- Finspång Fief
- Gullberg
- Göstring
- Hammarkind
- Hanekind
- Kinda (formerly part of Småland)
- Lysinge
- Memming
- Northern Tjust
- Northern Vedbo
- Skärkind
- Valkebo
- Vifolka
- Ydre (formerly part of Småland)
- Åkerbo
- Östkind

== Sports ==
Football in the province is administered by Östergötlands Fotbollförbund (ÖFF).

== See also ==
- Roundabout dog
