= Motala Church =

Coordinates: 58°32′7.3″N 15°2′19.4″E

- Motala kyrka
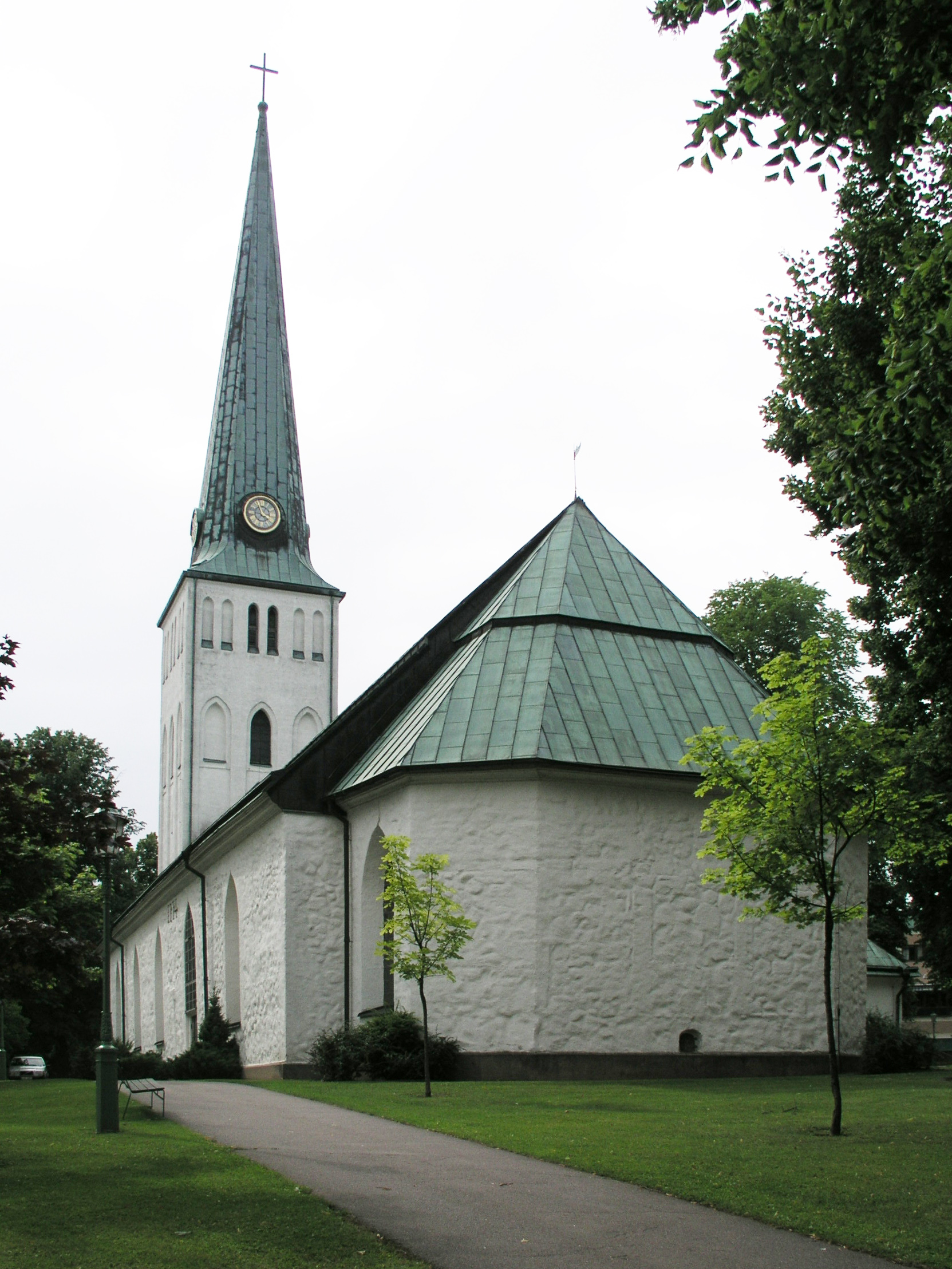
- Motala Church in late-July 2005
- Motala Church
- Location: Motala
- Country: Sweden
- Denomination: Church of Sweden

History
- Consecrated: 1774

Administration
- Diocese: Linköping
- Parish: Motala

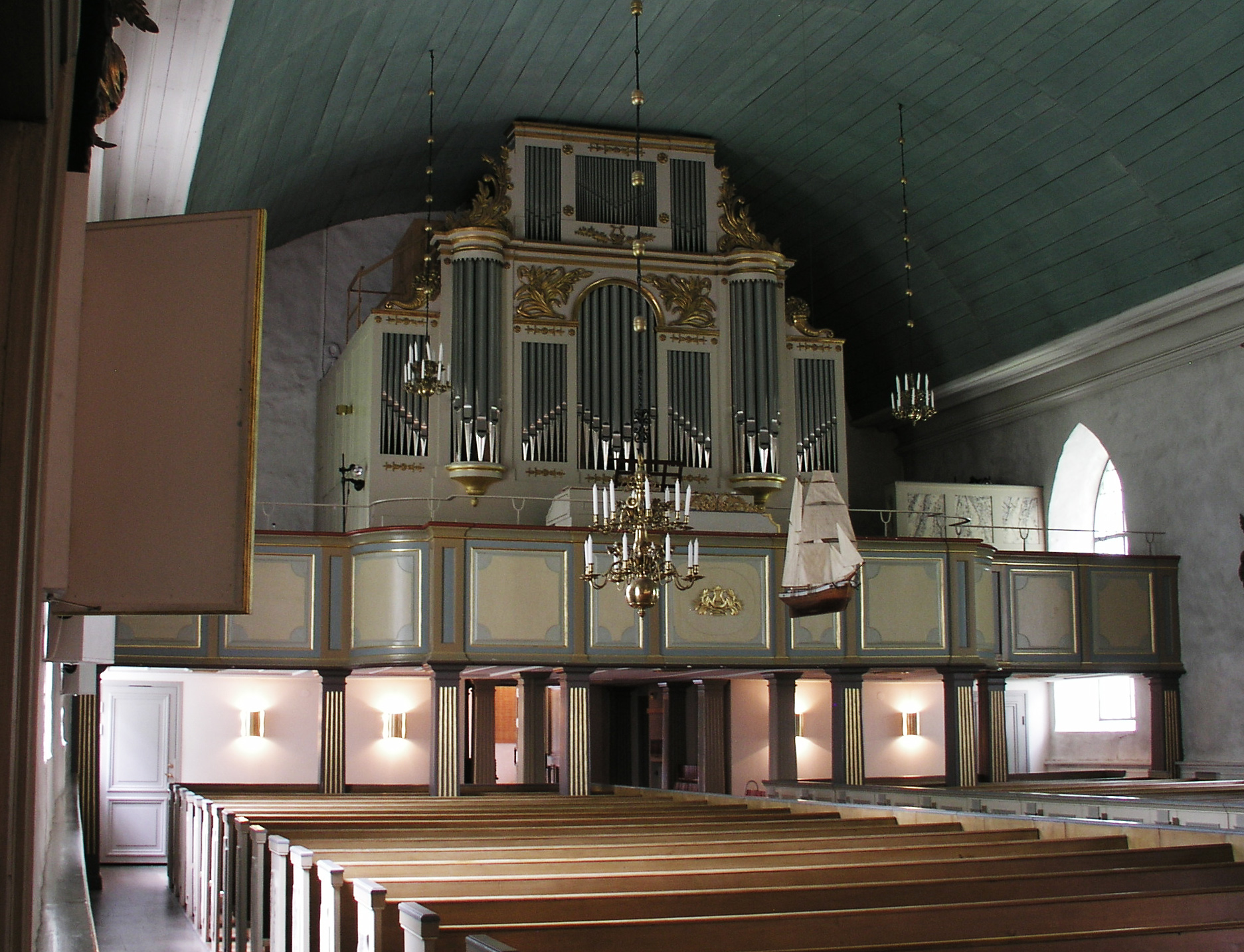
Church organ

Motala Church is situated in central Motala, in the province of Östergötland, Sweden. The oldest parts of the church were built in the 13th century. The present church was built 1772-1774. The tower was added in 1844.

Engineer Daniel Fraser is buried outside the church.
