= Daniel Fraser (engineer) =

Scottish engineer (1787-1849)

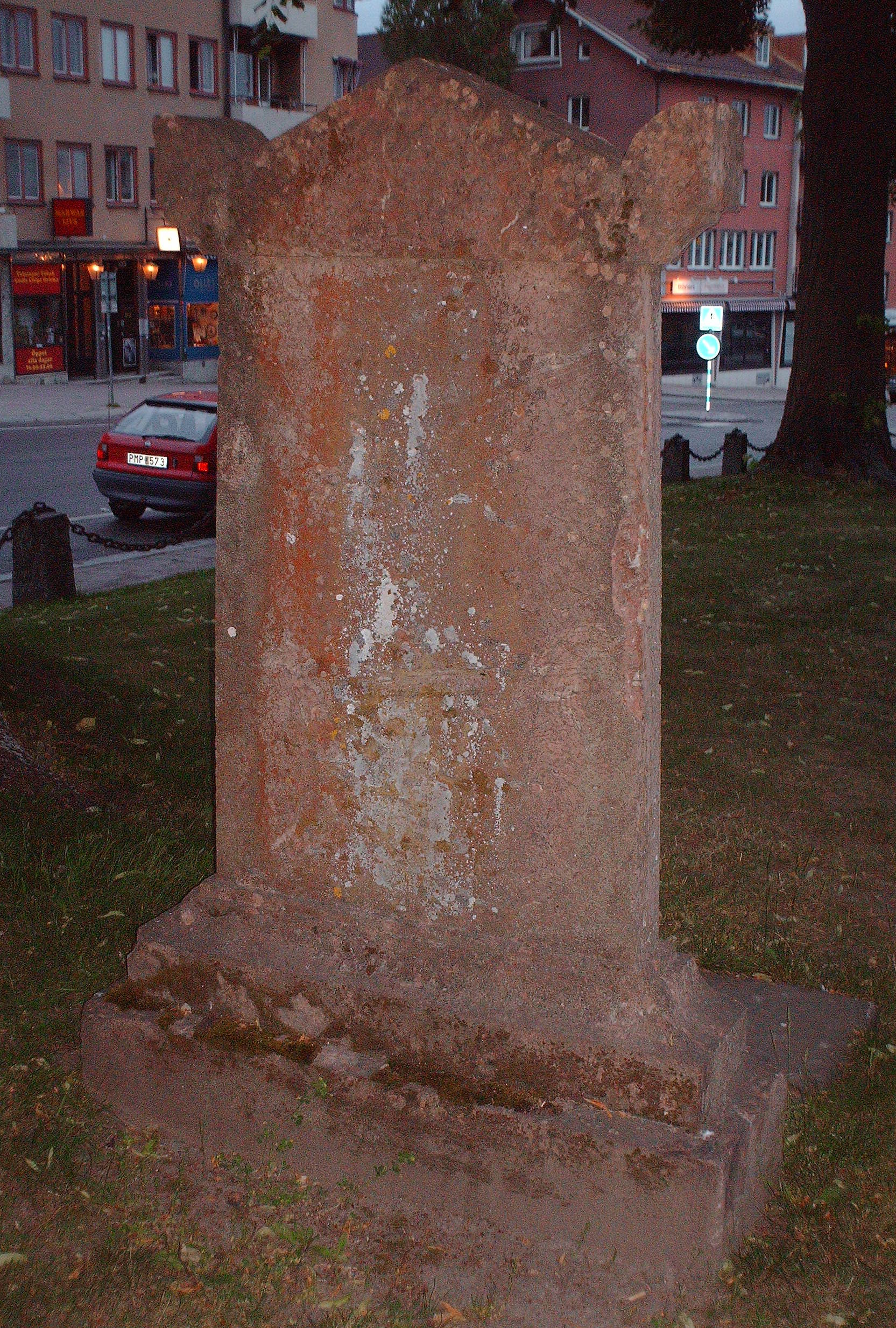
Fraser's gravestone at Motala Church.

Daniel Fraser (5 November 1787 in Roxburgh – 30 December 1849 in Motala) was a Scottish engineer who built a successful career in Sweden.

In 1822, he founded the first engineering industry in Sweden, Motala Verkstad, to manufacture the lock gates for the new Göta Canal, which had been designed by fellow Scottish engineer Thomas Telford. Fraser was the first head of the company (1822–1843). Thereafter he retired and lived at Charlottenborg Castle, where he also died. He is buried at Motala Church.

He was married to Agnes Storey.
