= Övralid =

Manor house in Motala Municipality, Sweden

Coordinates: 58°36.454′N 14°56.648′E

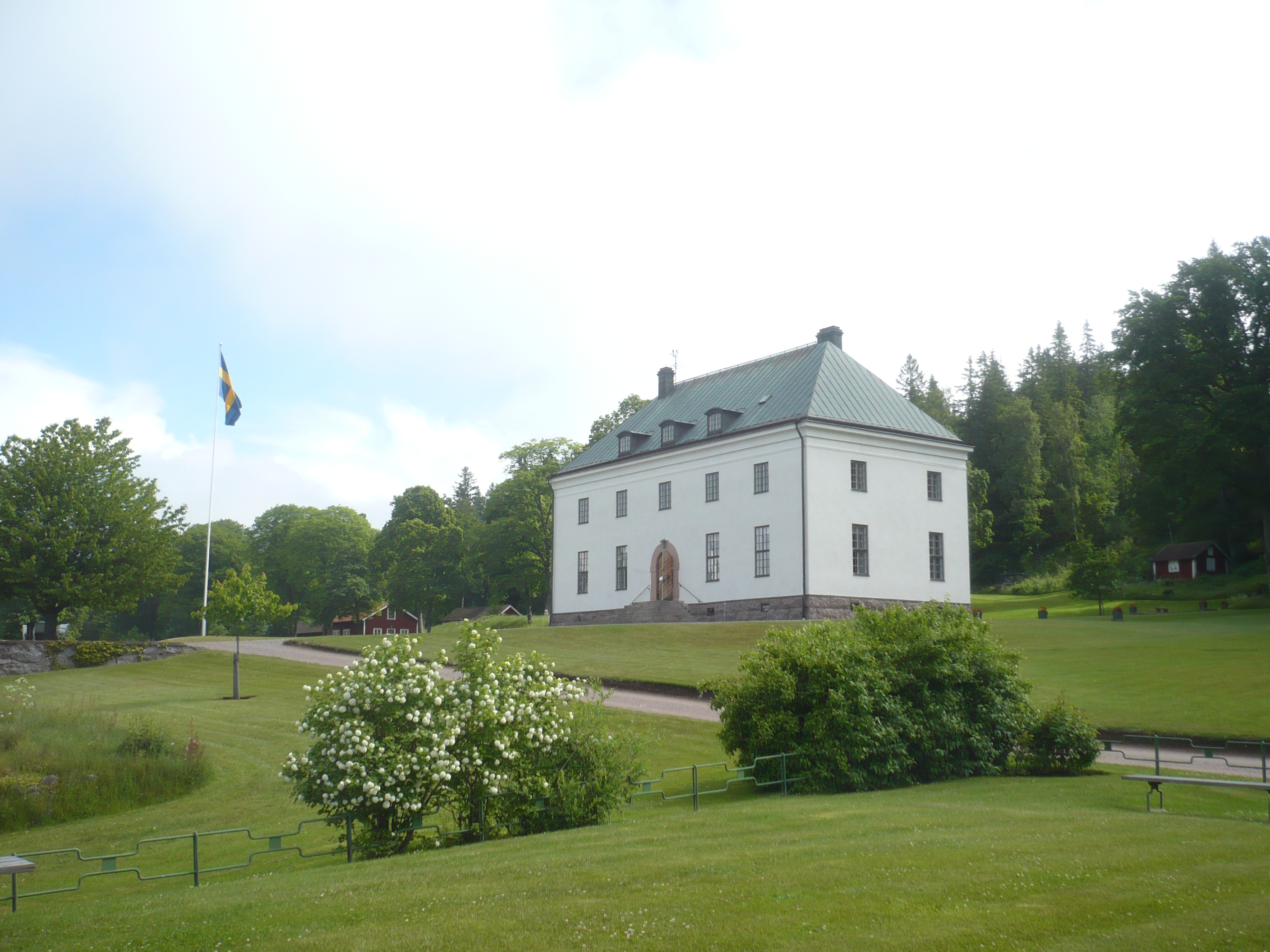
Övralid

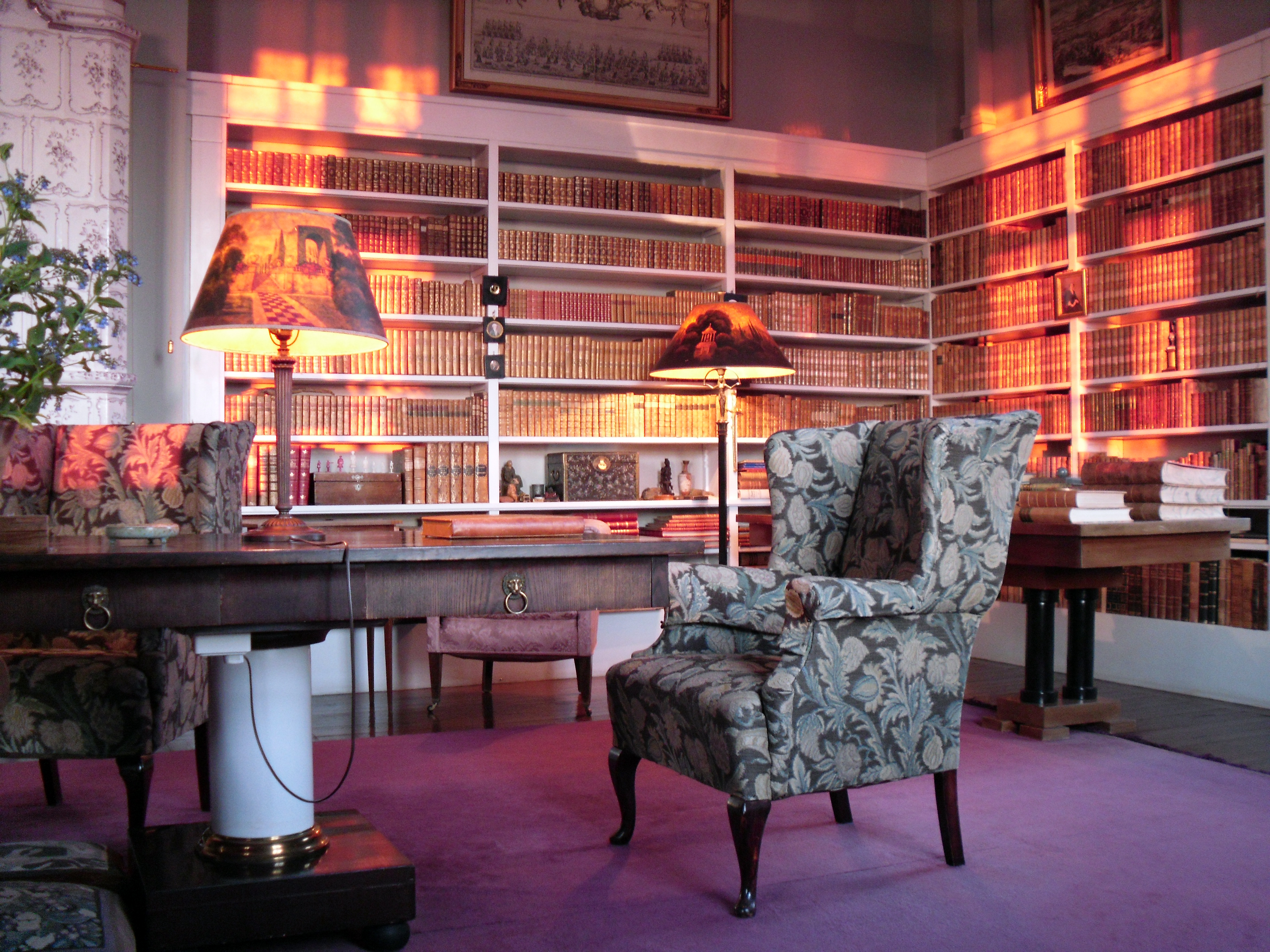
Övralid interior

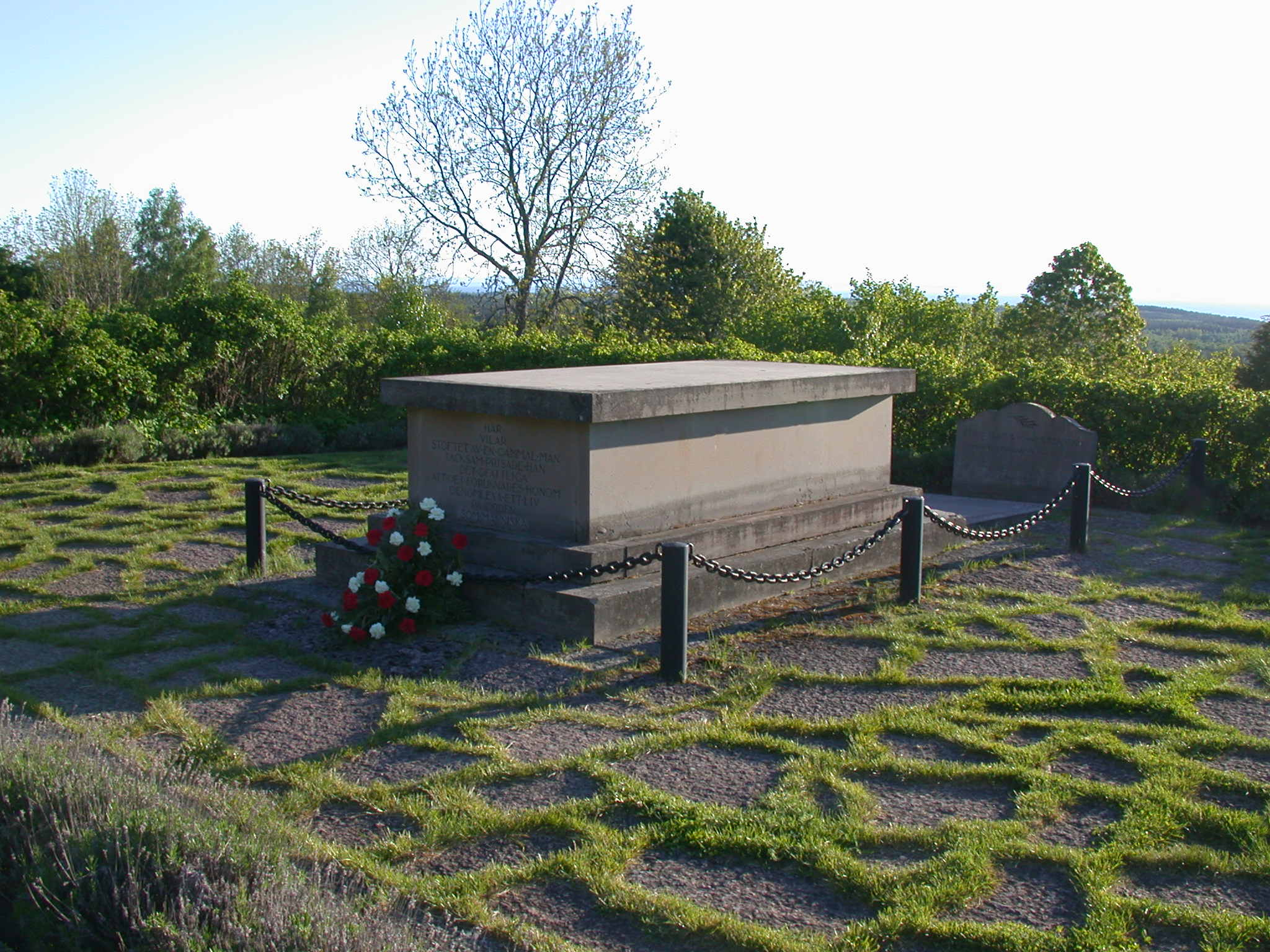
Tomb of Verner von Heidenstam

Övralid is a manor house located north of Motala in Östergötland County, Sweden.

== History ==
Övralid was erected between 1923 and 1925 by poet, writer, and Nobel Prize laureate Verner von Heidenstam (1859–1940). He was awarded the Nobel Prize in Literature in 1916.

Övralid was built on the east hillside of lake Vättern. The main building is a white-plastered wooden building on two floors. Övralid houses a library, a study, a dining hall, two bed rooms, and three guest rooms. The interior has been kept the way it was when Heidenstam died in 1940. The building is shown with guided tours in the summer and the personal belongings of Heidenstam can be seen where he left them at the time of his death. Heidenstam was buried in a tomb on the estate.

== Övralid Foundation ==
After Heidenstam's death, the original large land area was sold off. Today the manor is operated as a museum by the Övralid Foundation (Övralidsstiftelsen) which was founded in accordance with Heidenstam's will. The foundation also awards the Övralidspriset literary award on an annual basis.
