= Charlottenborg manor house =

- Charlottenborgs slott
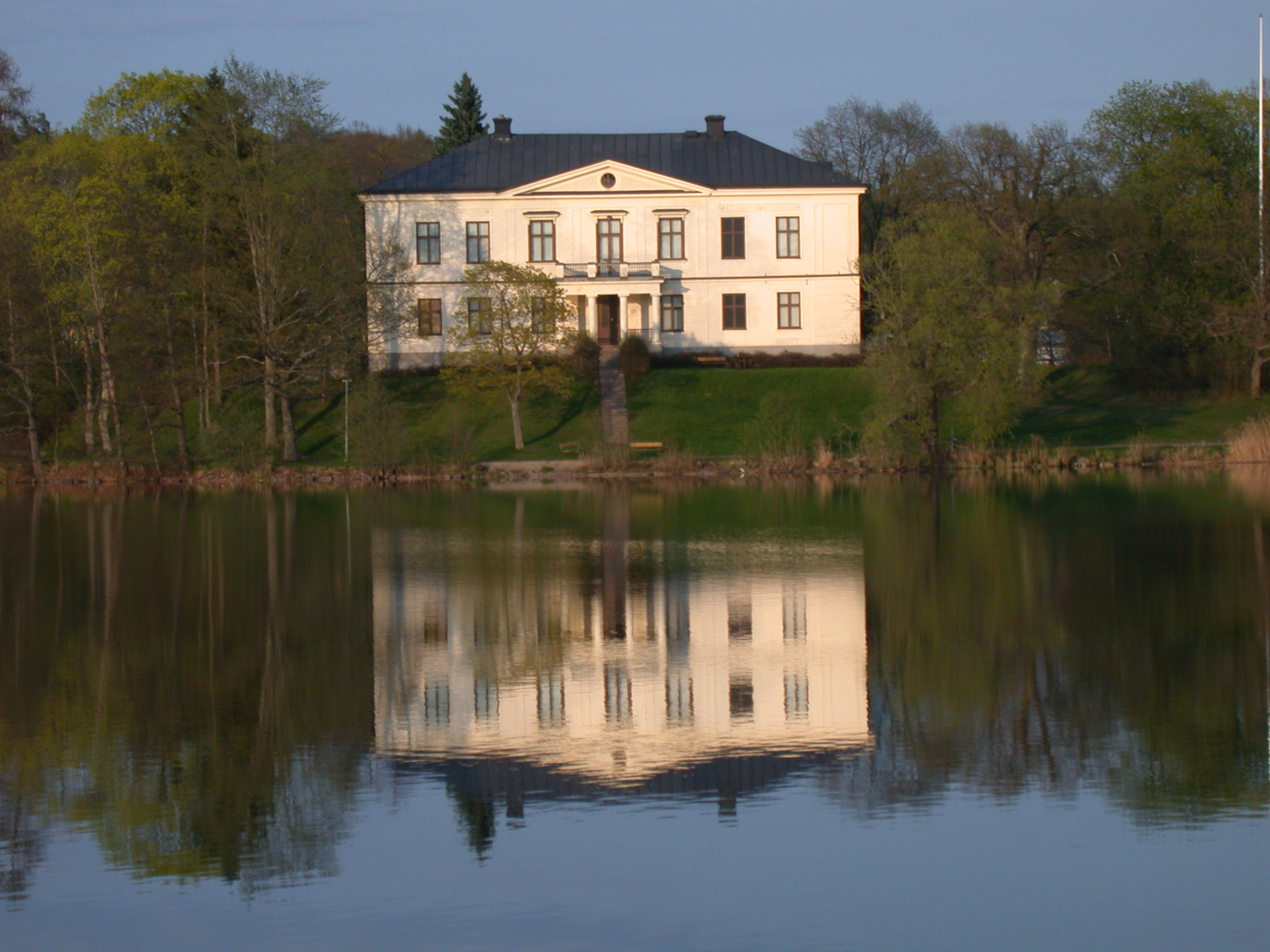
- Charlottenborgs slott
- Etymology: Charlotte von Hohenlohe-Neuenstein

General information
- Type: Manor house
- Location: Motala, Sweden
- Coordinates: 58°32′29″N 15°03′50″E
- Completed: Mid-17th century
- Owner: Motala Municipality

Website
- Motala Museum

Charlottenborg (Charlottenborgs slott) is a manor house in Motala on the shores of Motala ström in Östergötland county, Sweden.

The manor was built in the mid 17th century by Count Ludvig Wierich Lewenhaupt ( 1622-1668 ) and named in honour of his wife, Charlotte von Hohenlohe-Neuenstein (1626–1666). Charlottenborg was the former residence of both General Adam Ludwig Lewenhaupt (1659–1719) and engineer Daniel Fraser (1787–1849). The mid-seventeenth-century house that is shown in an engraving in the topography Suecia antiqua et hodierna by Erik Dahlberg (1625–1703) was rebuilt in more modern fashion in the eighteenth century.

Since 1959, the manor has been owned by Motala Municipality. Today Charlottenborg houses the Motala Museum, with exhibitions on local history. The museum also exhibits art from the 17th century to the 20th century. Among the artists represented are works by Bruno Liljefors (1860–1939) and Johan Krouthén (1858–1932).
