= The Swedes and Their Chieftains =

1908–1910 short story collection by Verner von Heidenstam

- Author: Verner von Heidenstam
- Original title: Svenskarna och deras hövdingar
- Translator: Charles Wharton Stork
- Language: Swedish
- Series: Läseböcker för Sveriges barndomsskolor
- Genre: historical fiction
- Publisher: Albert Bonniers Förlag
- Publication date: 1908–1910
- Publication place: Sweden
- English publication date: 1925
- Pages: 683

The Swedes and Their Chieftains (Swedish: Svenskarna och deras hövdingar. Berättelser för unga och gamla, lit. 'The Swedes and Their Chieftains: Stories for Young and Old') is a short story collection by the Swedish writer Verner von Heidenstam. It covers Swedish history through 41 stories organised chronologically, beginning at the transition from Stone Age to Bronze Age and ending in the 19th century. It was published in two volumes in 1908 and 1910.

The collection was commissioned to be used in Swedish schools and introduce Swedish history in an entertaining way. Selma Lagerlöf's The Wonderful Adventures of Nils and Sven Hedin's From Pole to Pole were commissioned for the same project, called Läseböcker för Sveriges barndomsskolor.

A selection of 19 stories from The Swedes and Their Chieftains was published in English translation in 1925.

== See also ==
- Our Forefathers
