= Sophia Isberg =

Swedish artist (1819–1875)

- Self Portrait by Sophia Isberg
- Born: 18 February 1819; Småland, Sweden
- Died: 28 February 1875 (aged 56); Motala, Sweden
- Known for: Wood Carving

Helena Sophia Isberg (18 February 1819 – 28 February 1875) was a Swedish wood-cut artist. Also known as Jungfru Isberg (Maiden Isberg).

Sophia Isberg was born at Säby in Tranås in Småland. She moved with her parents and brother to Motala in 1840, where she lived her entire life. Her father was a cabinet maker. Isberg was tutored by her father to cabinet maskery, lathing and carving, and was to become famous for her wood carving. In 1847, her work was exhibited in Stockholm, and made a success. She was asked to move to Stockholm, the professor Carl Gustaf Qvarnström (1810–1867) offered her a scholarship to study at the Royal Swedish Academy of Arts, Queen Josephine offered her an allowance of $200, but she declined every offer. A contemporary writer wrote about her: She preferred to stay in the poor hut where she was born, and remained in the bosom of the poverty which had surrounded her cradle.

Her work was exhibited in London (1862), Paris (1865) and Vienna (1875), and was internationally admired, but she was happy where she was, and lived with her brother in a cottage in Motala her entire life despite her success. On one occasion, King Charles XV of Sweden, upon a visit in Motala, expressed a wish to see Isberg. She was sent for by message to her cottage, but Helena Isberg answered, that if the King wished to see her, then he would have to come to her. No meeting took place, but Charles also admired her and also purchased her work.
