= Verner von Heidenstam =

Swedish poet and novelist (1859–1940)

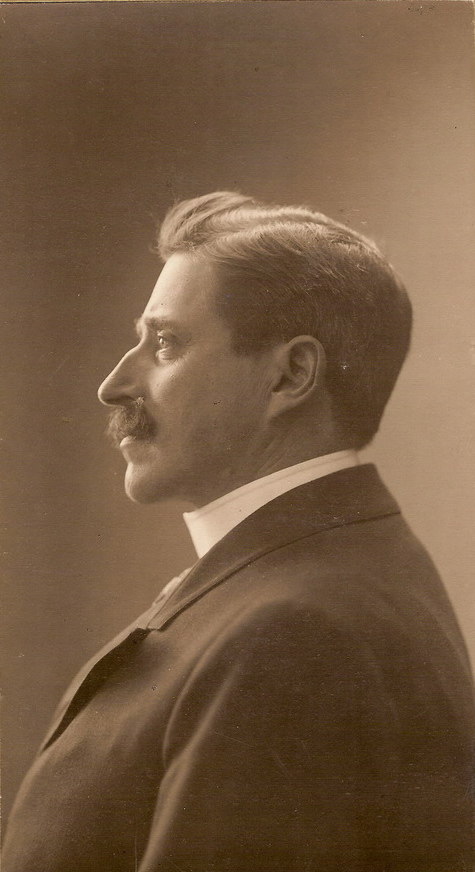
- Born: Carl Gustaf Verner von Heidenstam; 6 July 1859; Olshammar, Sweden
- Died: 20 May 1940 (aged 80); Övralid, Sweden
- Occupations: Poet, novelist
- Spouse(s): Emilia Uggla (m. 1880; d. 1893); Olga Wiberg (m. 1893; d. 1903); Greta Sjöberg (m. 1903; d. 1906)
- Father: Gustaf von Heidenstam
- Writing career
- Notable awards: Nobel Prize in Literature; 1916

Carl Gustaf Verner von Heidenstam (6 July 1859 – 20 May 1940) was a Swedish poet, novelist and laureate of the 1916 Nobel Prize in Literature. He was a member of the Swedish Academy from 1912. His poems and prose work are filled with a great joy of life, sometimes imbued with a love of Swedish history and scenery, particularly its physical aspects.

== Early life ==
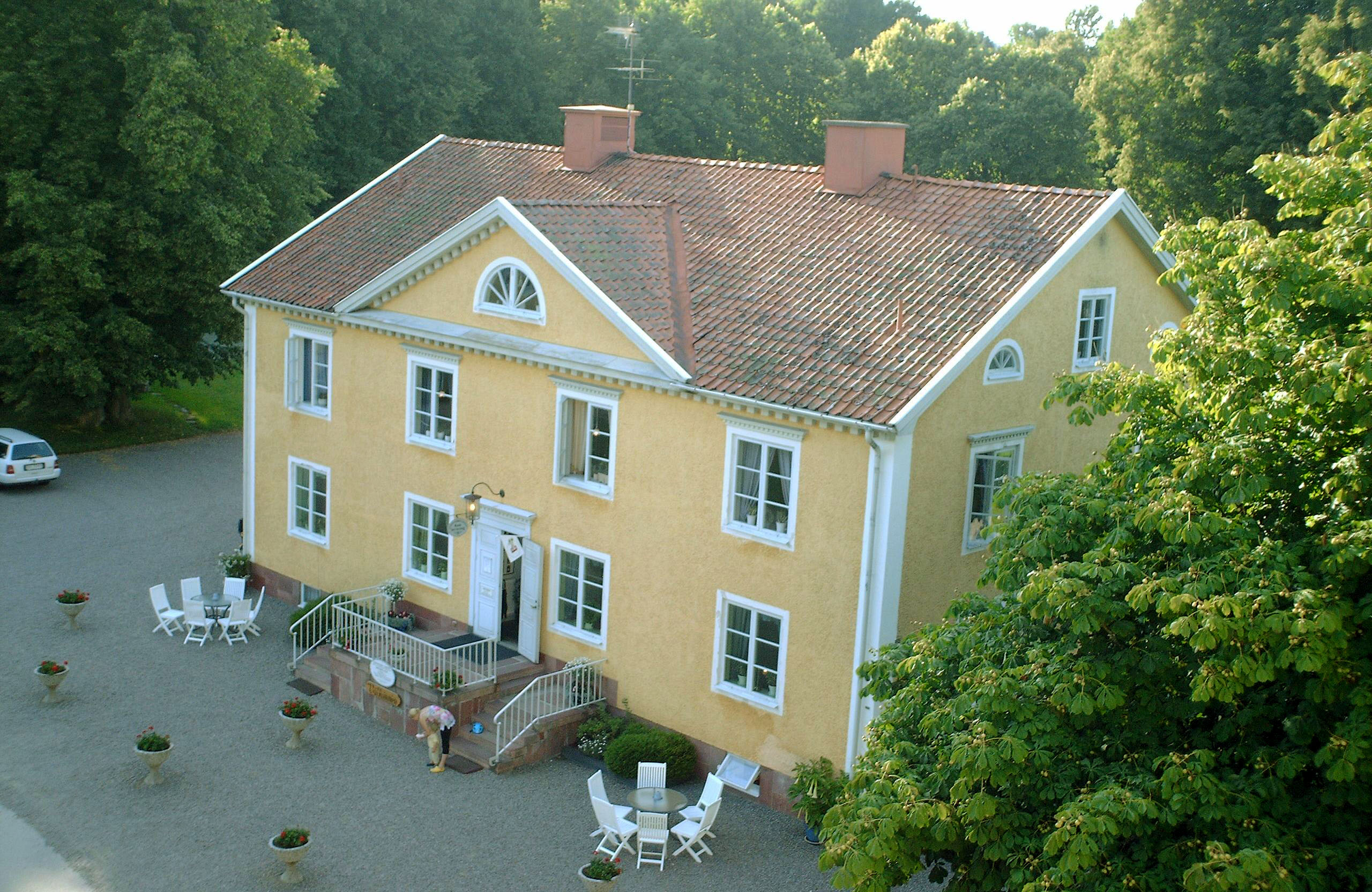
Von Heidenstam's birthplace at Olshammar, now Olshammarsgården

Verner von Heidenstam was born in Olshammar, Örebro County, on 6 July 1859 to a noble family. Von Heidenstam was the son of Gustaf von Heidenstam, an engineer, and Magdalena Charlotta von Heidenstam (née Rütterskiöld). He was educated at Beskowska skolan in Stockholm.

He studied painting in the Academy of Stockholm but soon left because of ill health. He then traveled extensively in Europe, Africa and the Orient.

== Literary career ==
He was at once greeted as a poet of promise on the publication of his first collection of poems, Vallfart och vandringsår (Pilgrimage: the Wander Years, 1888). It is a collection of poems inspired by his experiences in the orient and marks an abandonment of naturalism that was dominant then in Swedish literature.

His love for beauty is also shown by the long narrative poem Hans Alienus (1892). Dikter ("Poems", 1895) and Karolinerna (The Charles Men, 2 vols., 1897–1898), a series of historical portraits of King Charles XII of Sweden and his cavaliers, shows a strong nationalistic passion. English translations of short stories from Karolinerna can be found in the American-Scandinavian Review (New York), May 1914, November 1915, and July 1916. The two volumes of Folkunga Trädet (The Tree of the Folkungs, 1905–07) are the inspired, epic story of a clan of Swede chieftains in the Middle Ages.

In 1910, a controversy was waged in Swedish newspapers between a number of Swedish literary men on the topic of the proletarian "degradation" of literature, the protagonists of the two opposing camps being August Strindberg and von Heidenstam. Professors Lidforss and Böök also took part. von Heidenstam's chief contribution was the pamphlet, directed chiefly against Strindberg, "Proletärfilosofiens upplösning och fall" ("The Decline and Fall of the Proletarian Philosophy").

von Heidenstam's poetical collection Nya Dikter, published in 1915, deals with philosophical themes, mainly concerning the elevation of man to a better humanity from solitude.

== Death ==
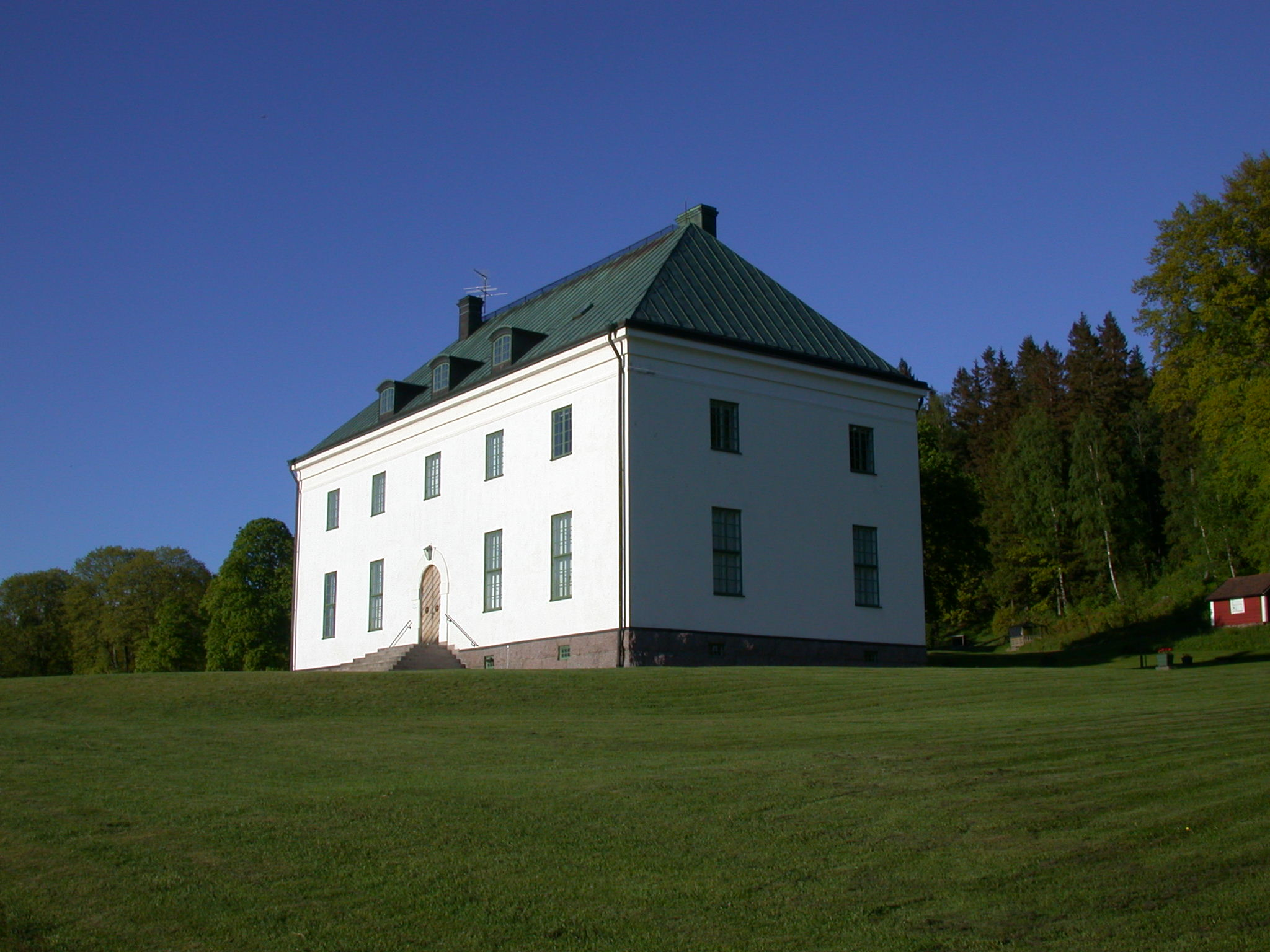
Von Heidenstam's very last residence at Övralid

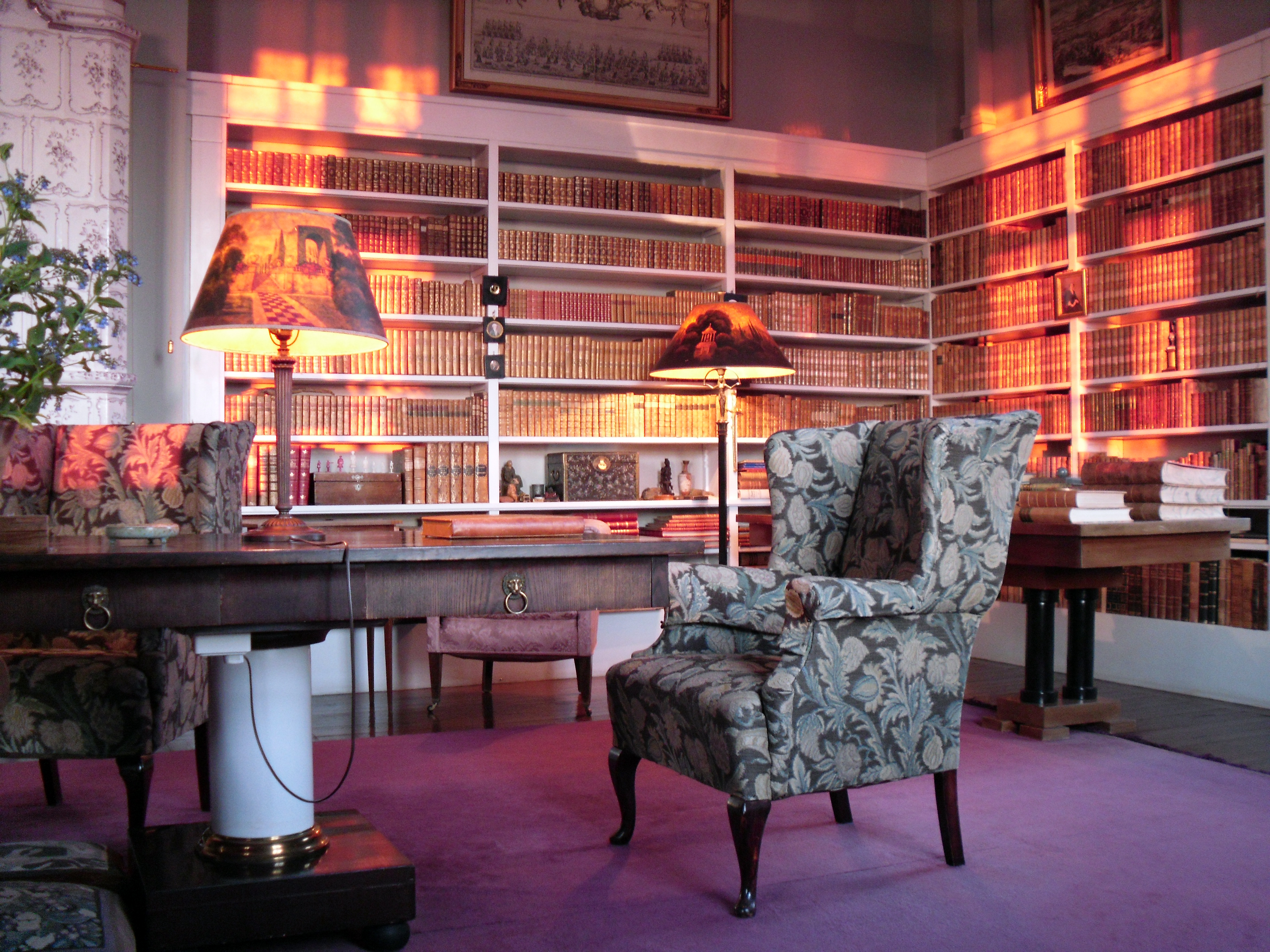
Övralid's library

He died at his home Övralid on 20 May 1940.

== Works ==
- Från Col di Tenda till Blocksberg , pictures of travel (1888)
- Vallfart och vandringsår (1888)
- Renässans (1889)
- Endymion (1889, novel)
- Hans Alienus (1892)
- Dikter (1895)
- Karolinerna (The Charles Men, 1897–98, novel)
- Sankt Göran och draken (1900)
- Klassizität und Germanismus (published in German, Vienna 1901)
- Heliga Birgittas pilgrimsfärd (Saint Bridget's Pilgrimage, 1901)
- Ett folk (1902)
- Skogen susar (The Forest Whispers, 1904)
- Folkungaträdet (The Tree of the Folkungs, 2 volumes, 1905–1907)
- Svenskarna och deras hövdingar (2 cvolumes, 1908–1910, historical short stories)
- Nya Dikter (1915).

Works in English translation

- A King and his Campaigners (1902)
- The Soothsayer (1919)
- Sweden's Laureate. Selected Poems of Verner Von Heidenstam (1919) - (trans. by Charles Wharton Stork)
- The Birth of God (1920)
- The Charles Men (1920) - (trans. by Charles Wharton Stork)
- The Swedes and Their Chieftains (1925) - (trans. by Charles Wharton Stork)
- The Tree of the Folkungs (1925)

== See also ==
- List of Swedish-language writers
- List of Swedish poets

Cultural offices
Preceded by Carl David af Wirsén	Swedish Academy, Seat No.8; 1912–1940	Succeeded by Pär Lagerkvist
