= Agnes Sandström =

Swedish Titanic survivor (1887–1985)

- Sandström in 1912
- Born: Agnes Charlotta Bengtsson; 8 November 1887; Örebro County, Sweden
- Died: 1 December 1985 (aged 98); Motala, Sweden
- Known for: Last Swedish-born Titanic survivor

Agnes Charlotta Sandström (née Bengtsson, 8 November 1887 – 1 December 1985) was a Swedish woman who was one of the last remaining survivors of the sinking of the Titanic on 15 April 1912. She was the last survivor who was born in Sweden.

== Early life ==
Agnes Charlotta Bengtsson was born 8 November 1887, in Lerbäck, Örebro County, Sweden, to Bengt and Lovisa Eriksson Bengtsson. She had seven older siblings, and later, three younger siblings. She emigrated to the United States in 1906, where she fell in love with ironworker Hjalmar Leonard Sandström, also a Swedish immigrant. Their first daughter, Margit Rut, was born in Chicago, Illinois, on 23 March 1908. They married on 23 June 1909. They soon relocated to San Francisco, California, where their second daughter, Beatrice Irene, was born on 9 August 1910. Agnes and her daughters had gone back to Sweden to visit friends and family, and in April 1912 were ready to return to America.

== Aboard Titanic ==
Twenty-four-year-old Agnes, four-year-old Margit and twenty-month-old Beatrice boarded the Titanic on 10 April 1912, in Southampton, England, as third-class passengers, three of a party of ten Swedes destined for California. They were originally not supposed to be on Titanic but were transferred due to a coal strike in many British ships at the time. The Sandströms shared a cabin with Elna Ström and her daughter Telma.

On the night of the collision, Agnes was awake and talking to Elna, her cabin mate. She [Agnes] later recalled,

"As we sat there talking there was a bump, something was hitting us. We couldn't understand that at first but then later on they came to tell us the ship had hit an iceberg, there was a hole but it would soon be fixed, and then we would be under way again."

Agnes and her daughters began their way up to the boat deck. She was under the impression that her cabin mates had followed her, but when she turned around, she discovered they were not there. Agnes never saw the Ströms again. She and her daughters soon escaped in lifeboat no. 13.

Agnes, Margit, and Beatrice were all picked up by the RMS Carpathia early the next morning. Elna and Telma both perished in the sinking, and their bodies were never identified nor recovered. Of the party of ten Swedes destined for California, only five, including the Sandströms, survived. Upon arrival in New York, the trio were hospitalized, before continuing onto San Francisco. The Sandström family, including Hjalmar, moved back to Sweden in the autumn of 1912.

== Later life and death ==
In Sweden, Agnes and her husband welcomed three more children. The trio of the family's Titanic survivors were featured in the Swedish newspaper Dagens Nyheter, in 1961 and 1962 respectively. Agnes died on 1 December 1985, in Motala, at the age of 98, having outlived both her husband and eldest daughter. She was the last survivor born in Sweden.

== Beatrice's later years ==
Beatrice could not recall anything about the Titanic voyage; however, she said that once, as a child, she exclaimed, "Look, the moon is falling down," perhaps in reference to the distress rockets the ship fired. She earned her wages by running a bakery in Sweden.

In 1988, Beatrice returned to the United States for the first time since 1912, where she took part in a gathering of survivors organized by the Titanic Historical Society. She died on 3 September 1995, at the age of 85. Her death left nine remaining survivors.
