= Motala longwave transmitter =

Coordinates: 58°32′44″N 15°2′34″E

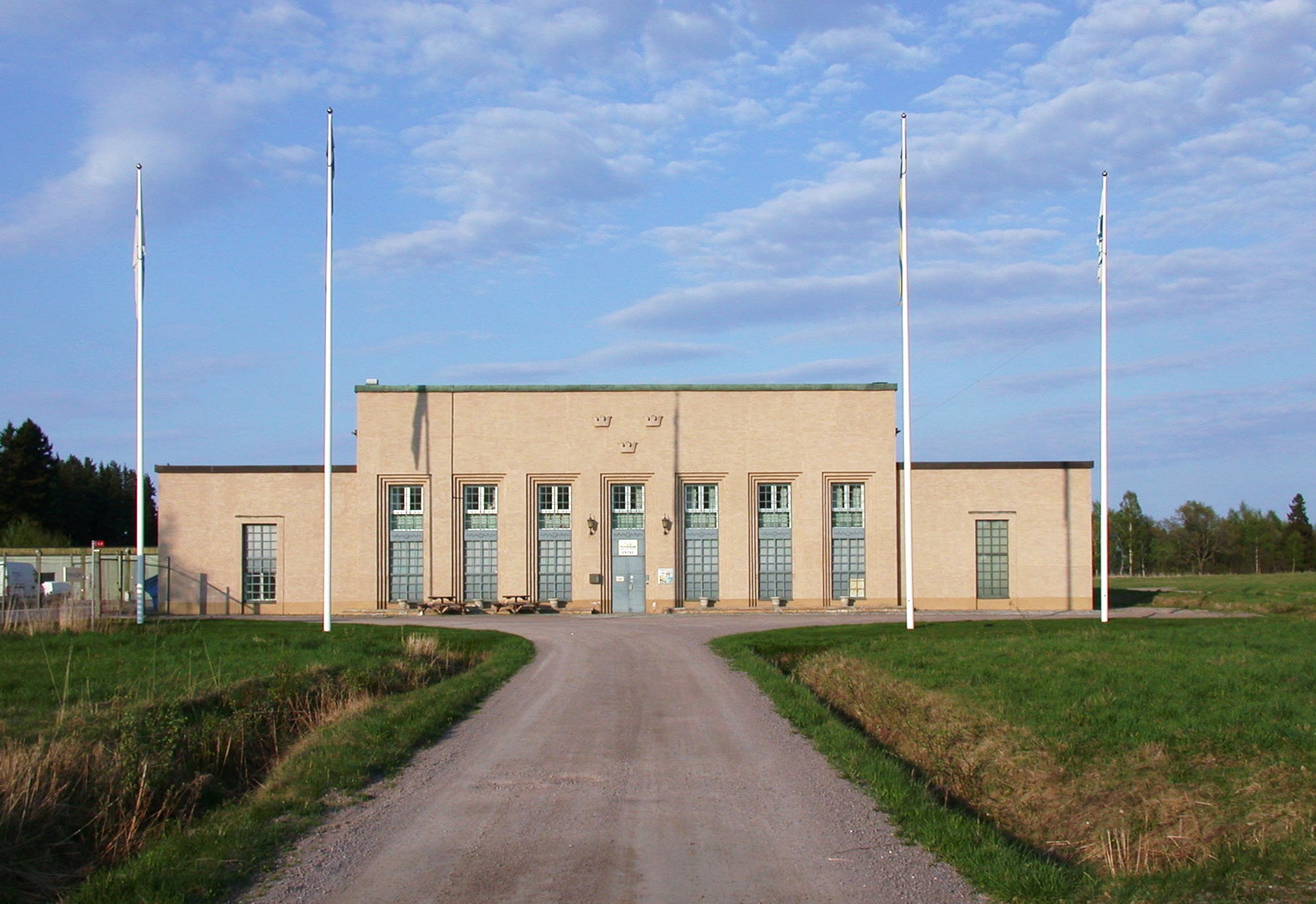
Station building of Motala longwave transmitter

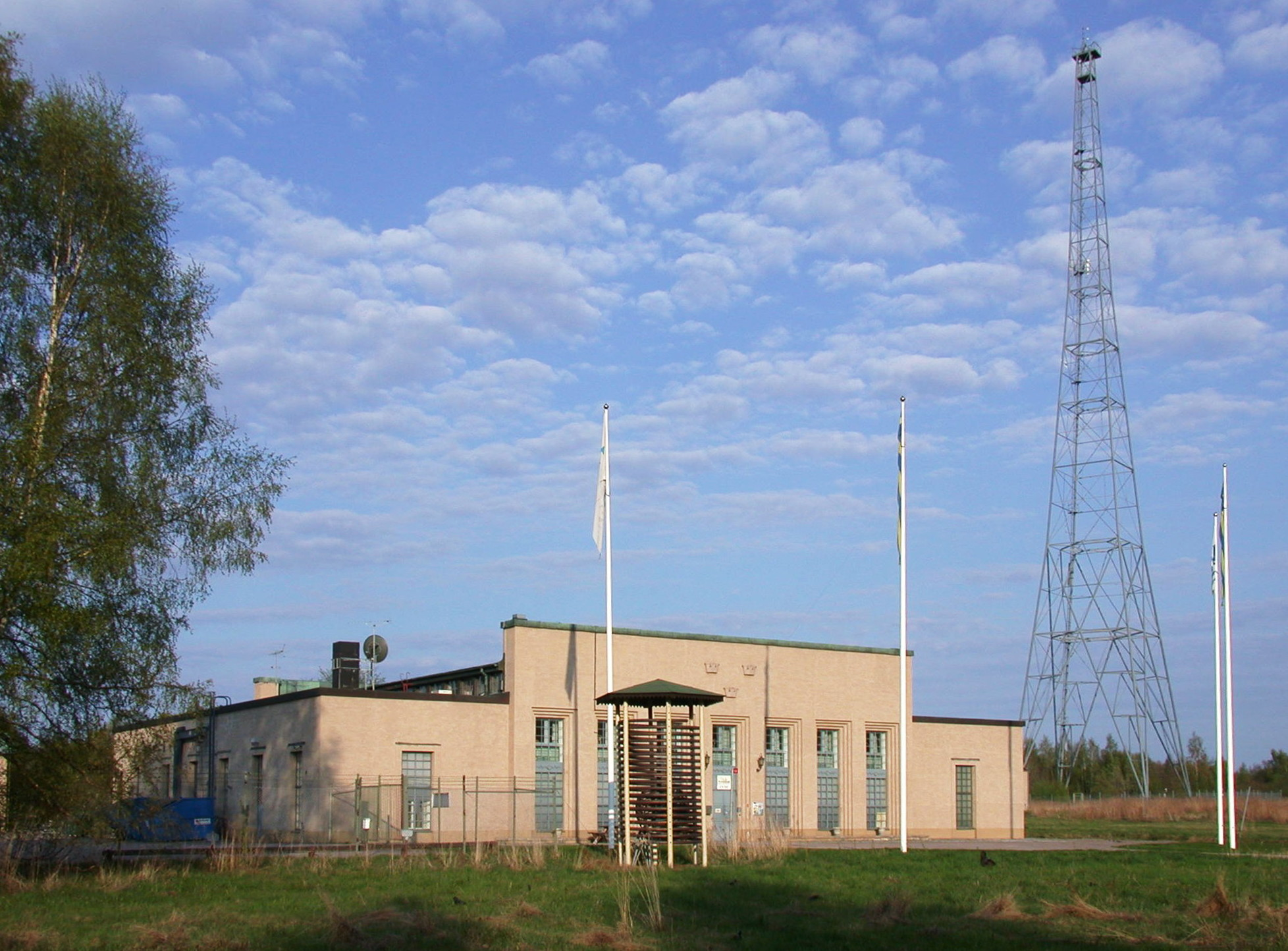
Station building and one of the towers of Motala longwave transmitter

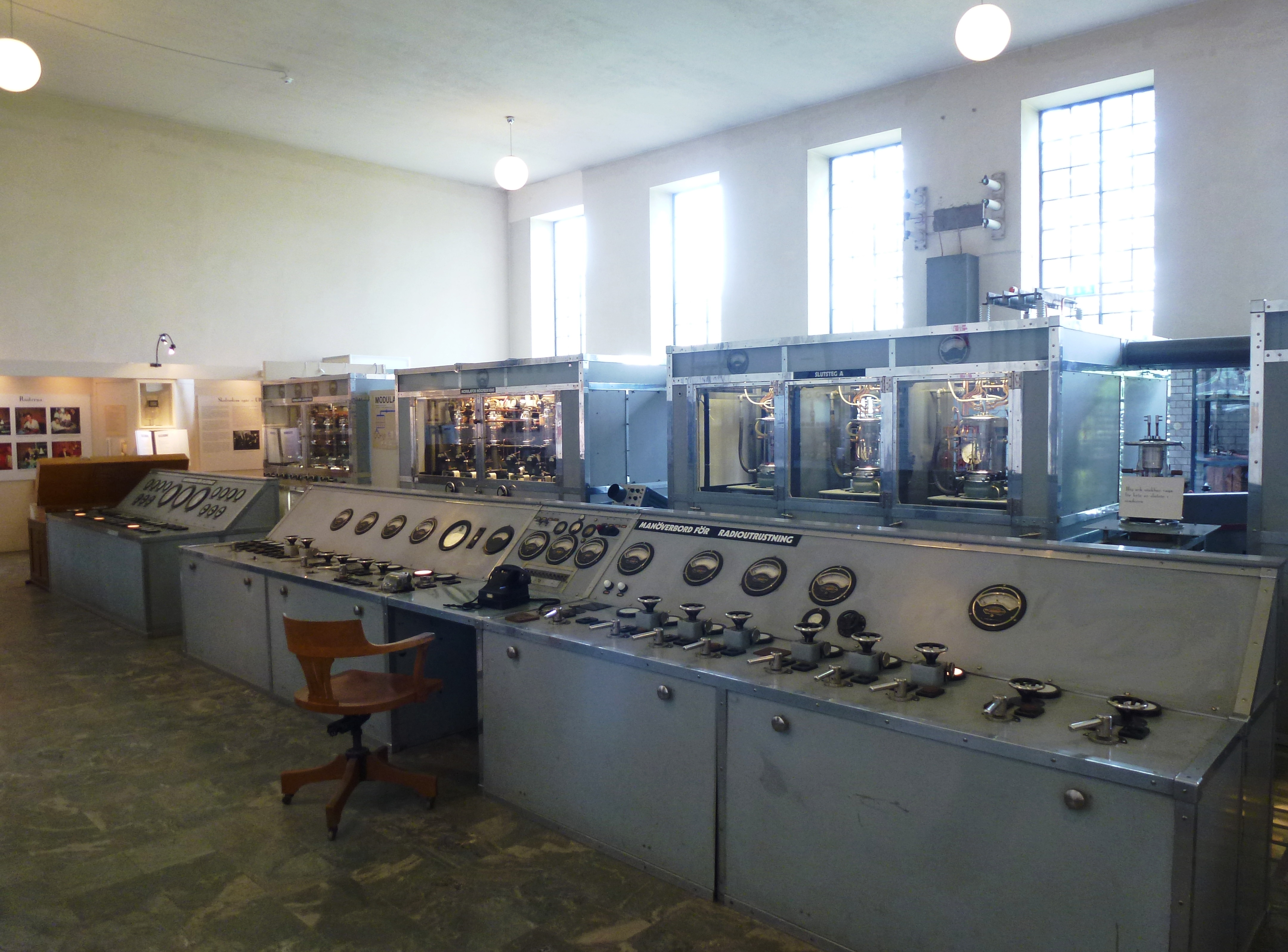
Marconi Company transmitter equipment, used 1935–1962

The Motala longwave transmitter (Swedish: Motala långvågsstation) is a longwave broadcasting station, established in 1927 in Motala, Sweden. Its aerial is of the T-type spun between two free standing steel framework towers, which still exist today. The transmitter was in service until 1962, when the new Orlunda longwave transmitter went in service. In 1991 Sveriges Radio AB shut down the Orlunda longwave transmitter. Since 1977, the Swedish Broadcasting Museum (Swedish: Sveriges Rundradiomuseum) is co-located at the Motala longwave transmitter building, from which sometimes transmissions with low power in the longwave range take place. These transmissions may not be received well from abroad.

== See also ==
- List of tallest towers
