= Motala Motor Museum =

Museum in Motala, Sweden

Coordinates: 58°32′0.5″N 15°2′15.5″E

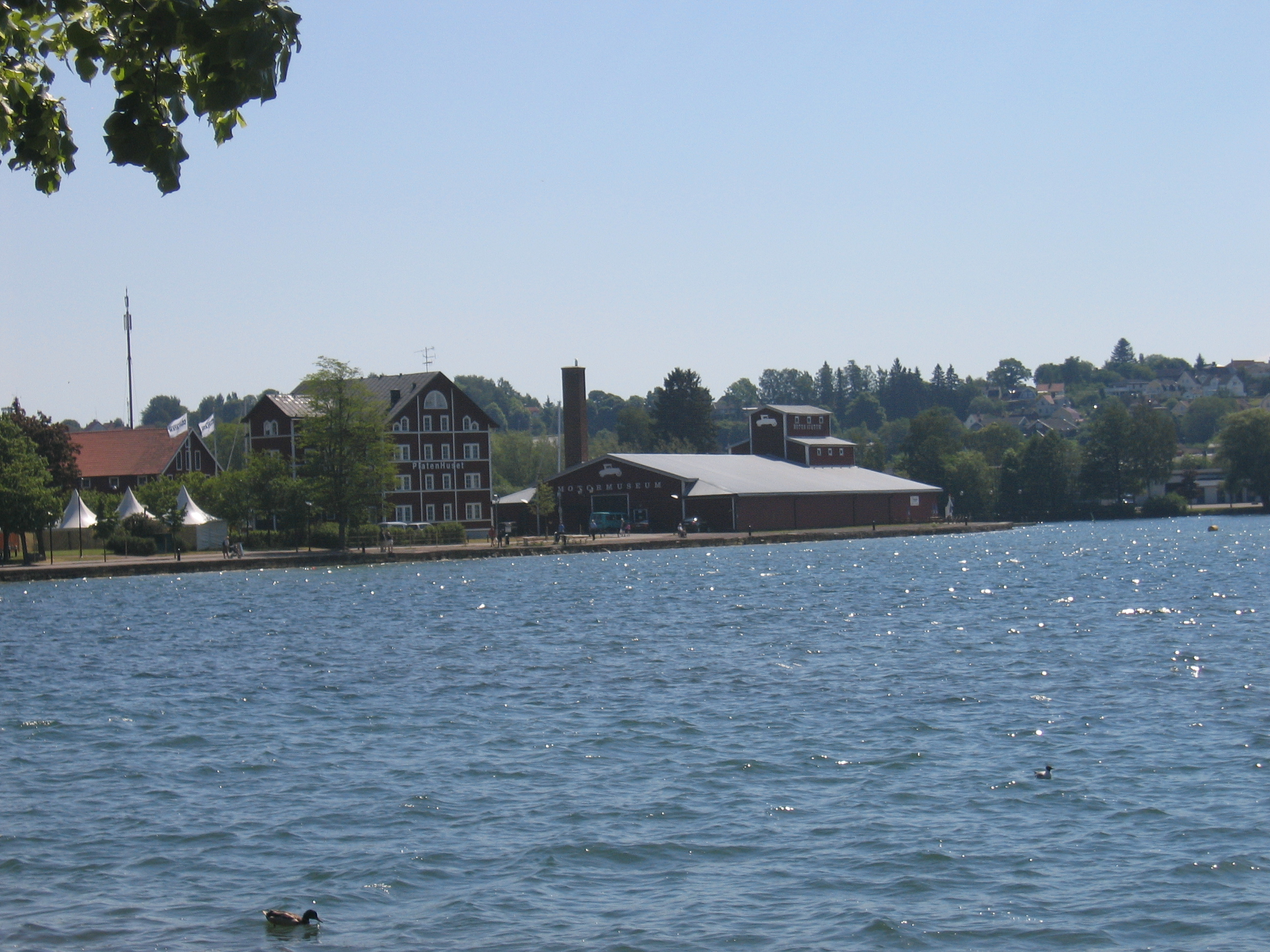
The museum by lake Vättern.

Motala Motor Museum is a museum in Motala harbour, Sweden. The museum opened in 1995 (30 years ago) and could be described as a "nostalgic museum". Over 200 vehicles; cars, mopeds, bicycles and 300 radios and TVs are displayed.
