= Orlunda radio transmitter =

Swedish radio broadcast station

Coordinates: 58°25′37″N 14°58′38″E

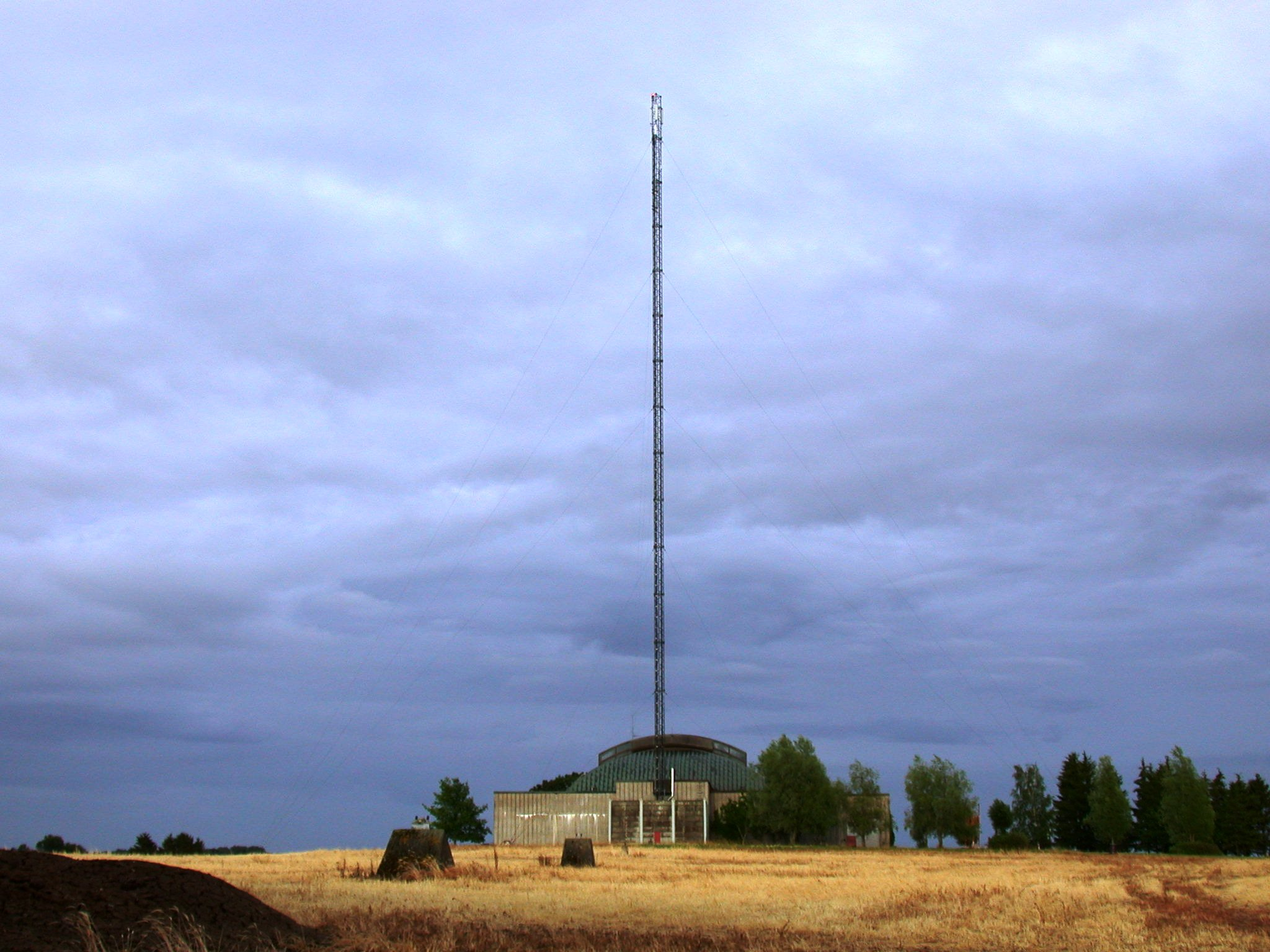
Orlunda transmitter building today with 86.4-metre tall guyed mast used for mobile phone services

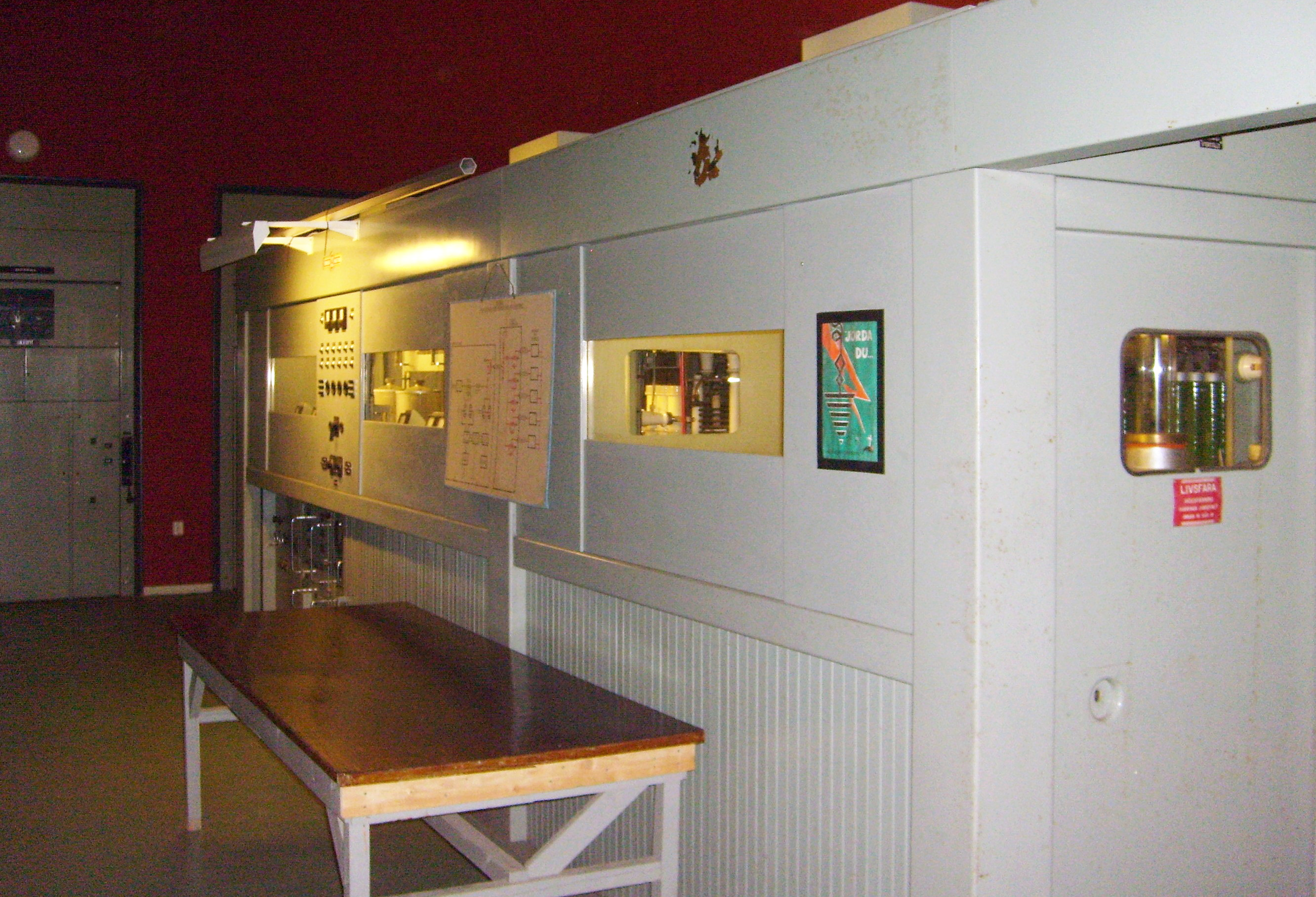
One of the two 300kW transmitters from CFTH

The Orlunda longwave transmitter was a longwave broadcast facility in central Sweden which broadcast Sveriges Radio Programme 1 from 1962 to 1991. The facility is currently in use as a museum.

== Planning and construction ==
The Swedish Telecom Administration Board and its technical department, Televerket, had begun plans for an upgraded longwave transmitter to serve central Sweden as early as the 1940s. The original facility, located in central Motala, was both antiquated and poorly situated; the transmitter was inefficient and staff were needed on site to operate it day and night, and signal fading occurred as close as 80 kilometres away. After numerous studies it was determined that a site east of the town of Vadstena would provide a clear signal to the surrounding area. Construction began in 1958; engineer Folke Strandén designed a ring antenna system consisting of a central mast surrounded by five antennas, to be connected to two 300 kW Compagnie Français Thomson Houston (CFTH) transmitters. The station itself was built underground in a windowless concrete bunker with 1.5-metre thick walls designed to survive a Soviet air attack. The bunker would host the power supply, transmitters, transformers, and a V-12 diesel engine to be used as a backup generator. All cables leading to and from the facility were likewise buried underground.

== Technical specifications ==
The two transmitters could be used either independently or together, and featured a CFTH specialty, steam-cooled tubes called "Vapotrones". They had a power efficiency of 66%.

The antenna system was designed to produce a ground wave intended to prevent interference with distant transmitters on the same frequency. The transmitter also broadcast a signal at a 40° angle; this did not affect reception, but its effect on distant stations is unknown. Programs were sent to the facility by telephone cable and were amplified before transmission. The centre antenna, 250 metres in height, was located near the station and the secondary antennas, 200 metres each in height, were arranged in a ring surrounding the station; each secondary antenna was 630 metres from the centre antenna and 630 metres from its neighbours.

Construction was completed in 1961 and the station was officially inaugurated by HRH Prince Bertil in May of that year. The station began broadcasting in 1962, after the necessary tests and adjustments had been conducted.

== Operations ==
The station originally broadcast Programme 1 of Sveriges Radio, the Swedish national broadcaster, on 191 kHz. Its improved coverage and higher power provided a better signal to hundreds of thousands of listeners in central Sweden. The station was also audible in northern Sweden at night.

Some Swedes complained that it was a mistake to build an expensive longwave facility financed by license fees when the more enjoyable FM radio was gaining in popularity. Critics pointed out that many FM stations could be built for the cost of one longwave station. Televerket responded by stating that the Orlunda station was required because many of its listeners did not yet own FM receivers. However, despite Televerket's insistence on the importance of AM broadcasting, it introduced an FM network only a few years later; the Orlunda facility was the last longwave transmitter and the second-last AM transmitter (Sölvesborg was the last) built by Televerket.

== Problems ==
Soon after the station entered service, the East German international station Stimme der DDR commenced broadcasting on 185 kHz, interfering with reception at longer distances. After several complaints, the East German government moved the station's frequency to decrease interference.

On 12 July 1970 the station's central antenna was struck by lightning, cutting off a stay, setting an oil-filled stay insulator on fire, and crushing the base insulator. This caused the central antenna to collapse over the bunker, destroying the antenna but causing little damage to the sturdily-built bunker; only a crack in the ceiling was visible from the inside entrance. Power was lowered to 150 kW while the feeders were reconnected to the five ring antennas. The central mast was never rebuilt. When the feeders were rebuilt the power was raised again to 300 kW, but lowered again in the 1970s to 100 kW after the 1973 and 1979 oil crises. This cut listenership as it increased maintenance costs; Televerket made plans to improve Sweden's AM radio network with five new 600 kW mediumwave transmitters and replacing Orlunda with new longwave facilities on the island of Gotland and at Mora. This would have improved coverage of northern Sweden and the Swedish speaking areas of Finland, but the plan never reached fruition.

Sveriges Radio later introduced processed sound to increase sound quality, but this had the effect of the modulation transformer almost reaching its alarm limit.

== The end ==
In 1986 the station's frequency was changed to 189 kHz to meet international standards proposed at the 1979 Geneva World Administrative Radio Conference. A rubidium oscillator was installed to stabilize the carrier. In 1987 three of the five remaining antennas were demolished as part of a military anti-sabotage exercise conducted by the Swedish Army's Life Regiment Hussars (K 3), of which some recorded sequences can be seen in the 1987 military educational film Förebudet (sv). The transmitter beam was later changed on the two remaining antennas to improve reception in Copenhagen and Helsinki without decreasing reception in Oslo.

Televerket conducted a survey in 1989 to gauge listenership, which revealed that only 200 people tuned in regularly. A request for 3 million Swedish krona in additional funding for transmitter maintenance was denied by the Swedish government in 1991, and it was decided shortly thereafter that the station would be shut down on 30 November of that year. Listeners had six months advance notice of the closure. The last broadcast featured a special program ending with the Swedish national anthem.

In 1994 and 1995 the two remaining antennas were dismantled.

== Today ==
Everything remains at the station today except for the antennas and the V12 diesel engine. It is currently operated as a private museum which may be visited by prior appointment. The lands surrounding the station were sold back to their original owners.

== See also ==
- List of masts
