= Olshammar =

- Location within Örebro Location within Sweden
- Coordinates: 58°45′N 14°48′E
- Country: Sweden
- Province: Närke
- County: Örebro County
- Municipality: Askersund Municipality

Area
  - Total: 0.85 km^{2} (0.33 sq mi)

Population (31 December 2010)
  - Total: 271
  - Density: 320/km^{2} (830/sq mi)
- Time zone: UTC+1 (CET)
  - Summer (DST): UTC+2 (CEST)

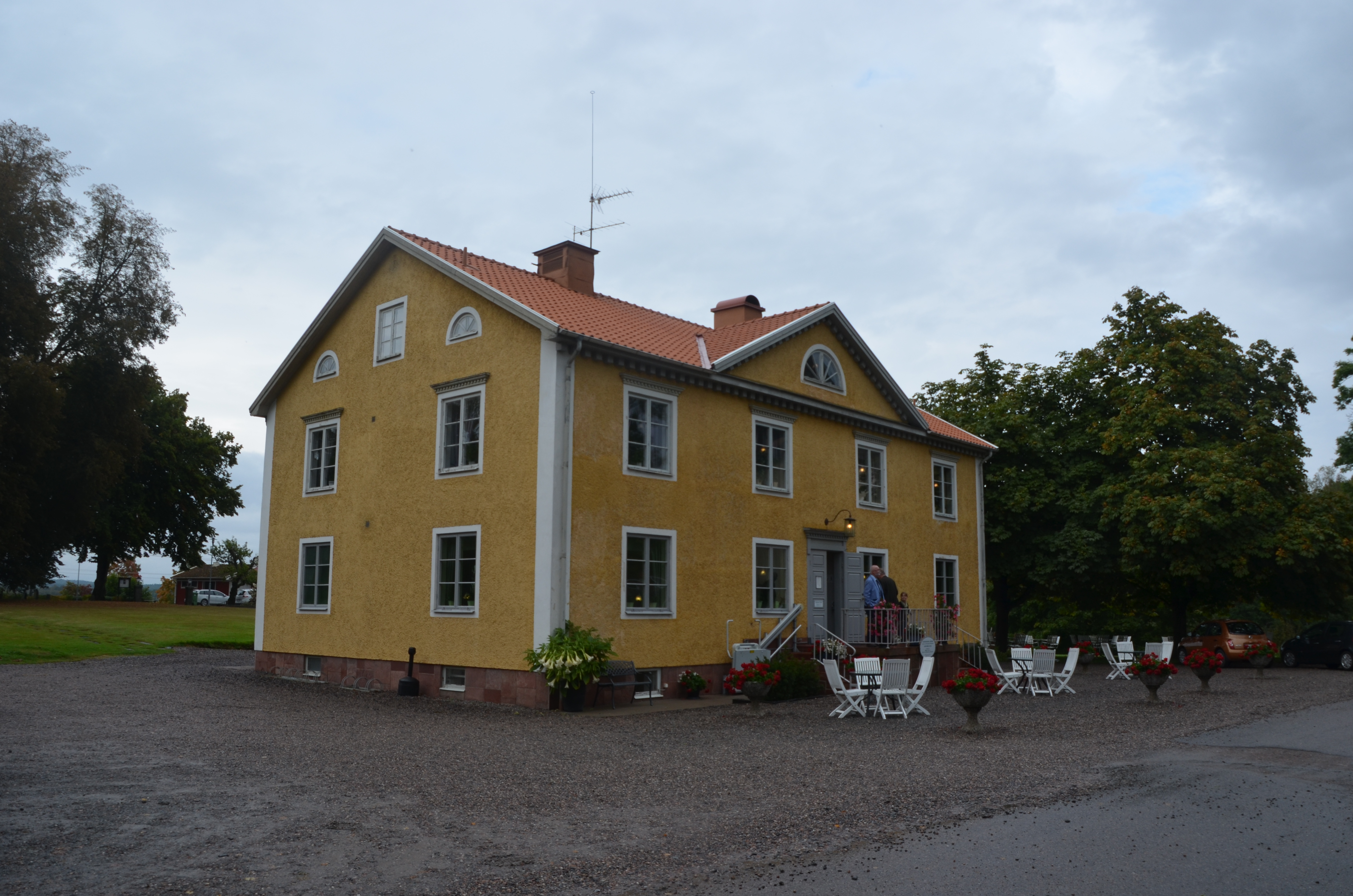
The Olshammar manor.

Olshammar is a locality situated in Askersund Municipality, Örebro County, Sweden with 271 inhabitants in 2010.
