= Motala Municipality =

Motala Municipality Motala kommun
- Municipality
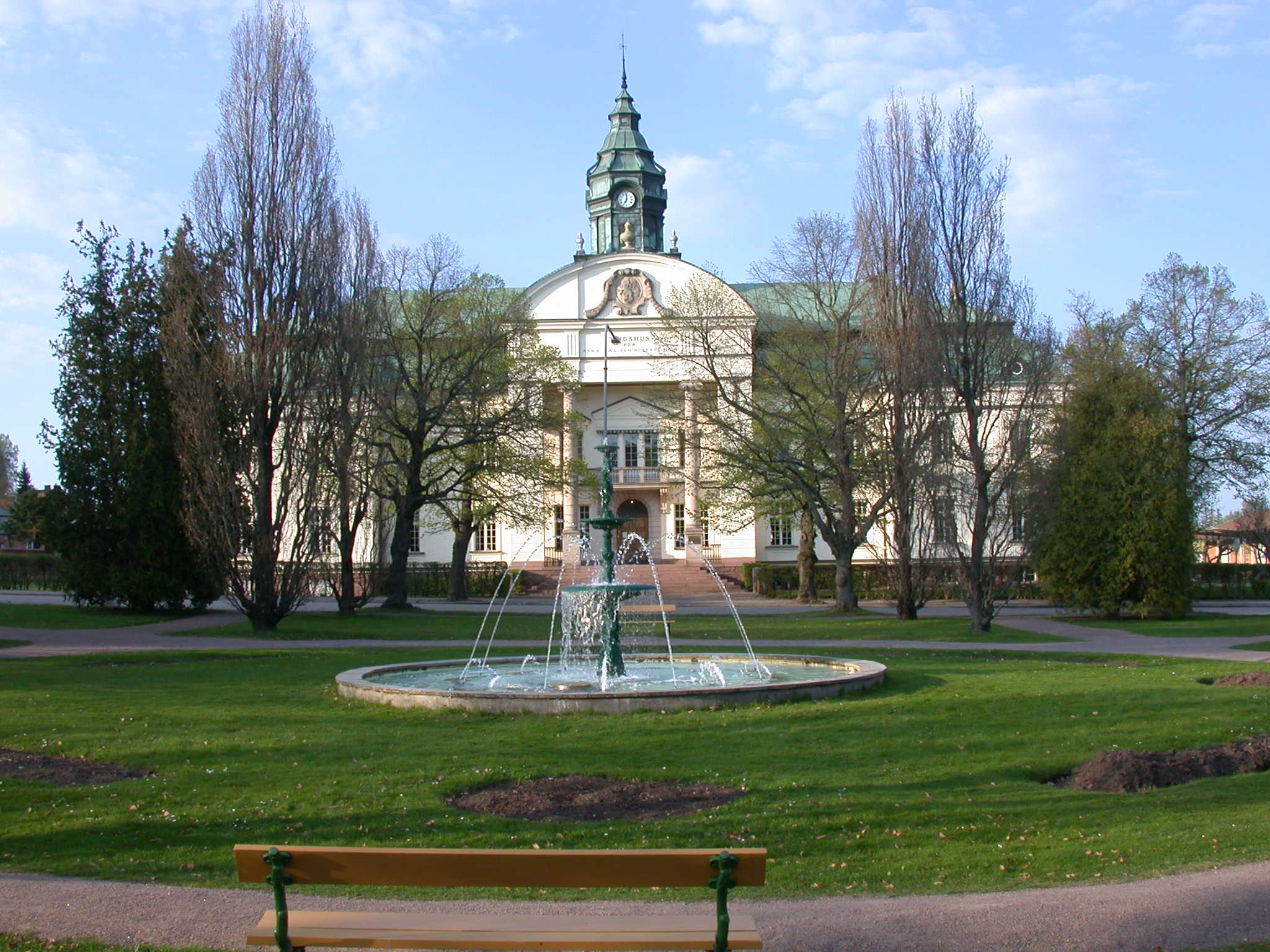
- Motala Courthouse

- Coat of arms

- Coordinates: 58°32′N 15°2′E
- Country: Sweden
- County: Östergötland County
- Seat: Motala

Area
  - Total: 1,267.23 km^{2} (489.28 sq mi)
  - Land: 983.49 km^{2} (379.73 sq mi)
  - Water: 283.74 km^{2} (109.55 sq mi)
- Area as of 1 January 2014.

Population (30 June 2025)
  - Total: 43,369
  - Density: 44.097/km^{2} (114.21/sq mi)
- Time zone: UTC+1 (CET)
  - Summer (DST): UTC+2 (CEST)
- ISO 3166 code: SE
- Province: Östergötland
- Municipal code: 0583
- Website: www.motala.se
- Density is calculated using land area only.

Motala Municipality (Swedish: Motala kommun) is a municipality in Östergötland County in southeast Sweden. Its seat is located in the city of Motala.

In 1971 Motala Municipality was formed by the amalgamation of the City of Motala with some of the adjacent rural municipalities. Three years later more entities were added, among them the former City of Vadstena. In 1980 a new Vadstena Municipality was split off.

Geographically, Motala is situated where Lake Vättern drains into the river system of Motala ström, which was of central importance to the massive industrialization of Sweden in the 19th century.

== Sights and museums ==
- Charlottenborg Castle
- Godegård manorhouse with the Swedish Porcelain Museum
- Göta Canal with locks
- Medevi 17th century spa, the oldest in Sweden
- Motala Church
- Motala Motor Museum
- The Museum of Motala Industrial History
- Nubbekullen, birthplace of artist August Malmström
- The Swedish Broadcasting Museum with the twin radio towers
- Ulvåsa, manorhouse and medieval ruins of St Bridget's home
- Varamon beach
- Västra Stenby Church and rune stone
- Övralid, manorhouse and home of author Verner von Heidenstam

== Localities ==
Figures as of 2000, from Statistics Sweden.

1. Motala 30,136 (seat)
2. Borensberg 2,667
3. Tjällmo 562
4. Fornåsa 446
5. Nykyrka 434
6. Fågelsta 334
7. Österstad 329
8. Klockrike 275
9. Godegård 200

The population decreased by approximately 2% in most of the localities between the earlier census 1995 and the one in 2000.

== Demographics ==
This is a demographic table based on Motala Municipality's electoral districts in the 2022 Swedish general election sourced from SVT's election platform, in turn taken from SCB official statistics.

In total there were 43,620 residents, including 33,347 Swedish citizens of voting age. 46.4% voted for the left coalition and 52.6% for the right coalition. Indicators are in percentage points except population totals and income.

Location	Residents	Citizen adults	Left vote	Right vote	Employed	Swedish parents	Foreign heritage	Income SEK	Degree
Location			%	%					
Bergsätter	1,997	1,547	51.4	48.1	85	86	14	25,719	31
Bispmotala	1,730	1,426	53.8	45.1	65	70	30	17,777	26
Borensberg V	2,217	1,713	48.7	50.3	88	95	5	28,406	47
Borensberg Ö	2,129	1,649	46.2	53.0	85	93	7	26,742	44
Borenshult	2,148	1,687	43.4	55.9	86	91	9	28,130	36
Brunnsvik	2,065	1,633	48.9	50.5	88	89	11	28,168	37
Bråstorp	1,981	1,526	43.5	56.1	83	88	12	27,310	38
Centrum	1,717	1,464	47.4	51.1	77	76	24	20,339	29
Charlottenborg	2,026	1,392	57.9	41.4	70	56	44	20,422	23
Ekenäs	1,623	1,138	54.1	44.1	70	64	36	20,932	26
Ekön	2,173	1,145	68.1	29.3	52	34	66	14,212	16
Fornåsa-Österstad	2,308	1,735	37.1	62.3	86	92	8	26,454	32
Fågelsta	1,272	984	39.1	60.2	83	92	8	26,794	28
Godegård	660	566	43.7	55.2	77	92	8	20,760	26
Holm	2,007	1,614	42.8	56.5	84	85	15	26,620	31
Hyddmarken	1,919	1,329	46.9	52.1	68	77	23	21,319	27
Marieberg V	1,638	1,294	45.6	53.5	84	83	17	26,381	38
Marieberg Ö	1,625	1,097	55.2	41.6	61	44	56	16,696	22
Mossen	2,007	1,632	42.7	56.9	79	82	18	24,766	30
Nykyrka	1,778	1,479	43.9	55.5	82	93	7	25,126	30
Samuelsberg	1,795	1,431	42.2	57.0	75	79	21	24,065	31
Söder	2,002	1,607	40.1	58.7	85	87	13	27,818	35
Tjällmo	1,123	917	41.2	57.3	81	93	7	23,391	25
Östermalm	1,680	1,342	45.4	53.7	81	89	11	26,144	37
Source: SVT

== Industry ==
The largest employer is the municipality itself, employing circa 3,400 people. The next is the county council with 1,775.

Of the private employers, Electrolux and Dometic have a total of 1,400; Autoliv 425; Hycop 325; Saab-Bofors Dynamics circa 300; And Motala Verkstad some 180. (source )

== International relations ==
=== Twin towns — sister cities ===
Motala is twinned with:

- Daugavpils, Latvia
- Hyvinkää, Finland
