= Battles of Kopperberget and Opphöga ferry =

Battles at Kopperberget and Opphöga ferry

- Part of Erik Karlssons rebellion
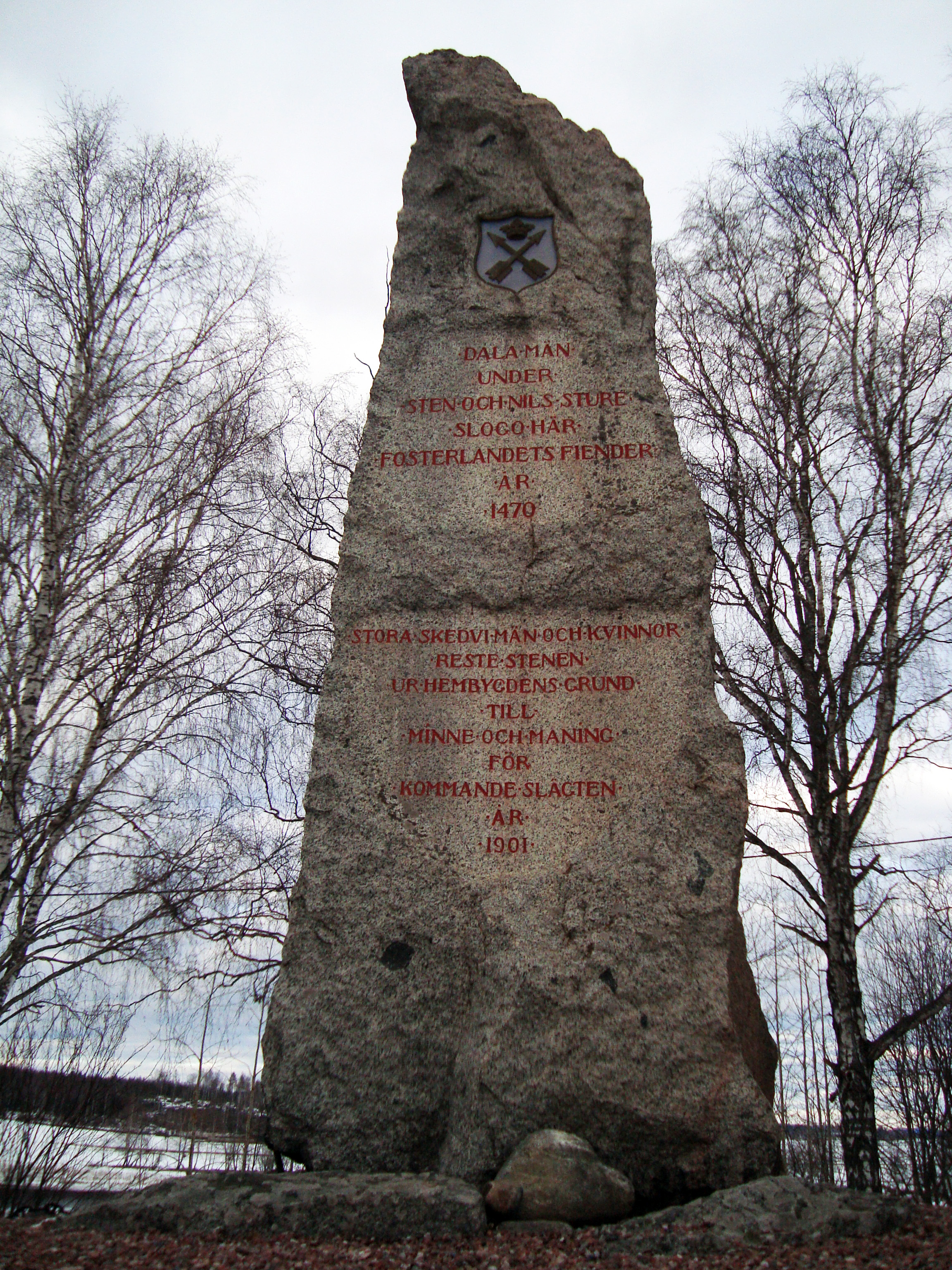
- Memorial stone raised 1901 in memorial for the battle of Uppbo färja 1470
Date	January 10–13, 1470
Location	Kopparberget and Opphöga ferry, Dalarna
Result	Swedish victory
Territorial changes	Erik Karlsson's rebellion is quelled

Belligerents
Insurgents	(History of Sweden (800–1521)) Sweden; Supported by Dalarna

Commanders and leaders
Erik Karlsson Vasa	(History of Sweden (800–1521)) Sten Sture the Elder (History of Sweden (800–1521)) Nils Sture (History of Sweden (800–1521)) Hans Aagessøn

Strength
Unknown, but larger than the Swedish army	At least 105 men

Casualties and losses
Almost the entire army was killed 1,500 pieces of armor captured	Presumably small

The Battles of Kopparberget and Opphöga ferry were a series confrontations between an insurgent army under Erik Karlsson Vasa and a Dalecarlian army led by Sten Sture the Elder, and Nils Sture at Kopparberget and Opphöga ferry in 1470. The battles resulted in a defeat for the insurgents.

== Background ==
=== Reason behind Erik Karlssons rebellion ===
The exact reason for his rebellion is unknown, with some sources stating that Erik Karlsson was thirsty for war, and began his rebellion for this reason. With others saying that it was old loyalists to Jöns Bengtsson Oxenstierna that had risen up again, and another possible reason being that Karl Knutsson had angered the nobility by forbidding them from engaging in piracy.

=== Beginning of the rebellion ===
The rebellion began on 13 October 1469, with Erik Karlsson's men marching into Vadstena and kidnapping several of Karl Knutssons advisors, however, their attempt to kidnap Karl Knutsson himself ends in failure, since he had not arrived to Vadstena in time.

=== Prelude ===
After pacifying the population around the Mälaren, Erik went against the population of Dalarna in January 1470. This would turn out to be a disaster.

== Battles ==
=== Battle of Kopparberget ===
On January 10 after marching from Hedemora, Eriks troops were confronted by a Dalecarlian peasant vanguard army around 20 miles from Kopparberget. Erik decided that the terrain was undesirable, and likely after hearing news that the main force was close, he chose to retreat.

=== Battle of Opphöga ferry ===
On January 13, during his retreat from Kopparberget, Erik attempted to flee over the Dalälven when his force was intercepted by the main Dalecarlian force, which only consisted of around 105 men under the command of Nils Sture and his brother-in-law Hans Aagessøn Tott, during the battle, Erik suffered a crushing defeat, with the majority of his army being destroyed and 1,500 pieces of armor being taken by the army under Nils Sture and Hans.

== Aftermath ==
As a result of the battle at Opphöga, Erik along with other leaders like Trötte Karlsson, and Herr Erik Nilsson were forced to flee to Denmark.
