= Vadstena =

Place in Östergötland, Sweden

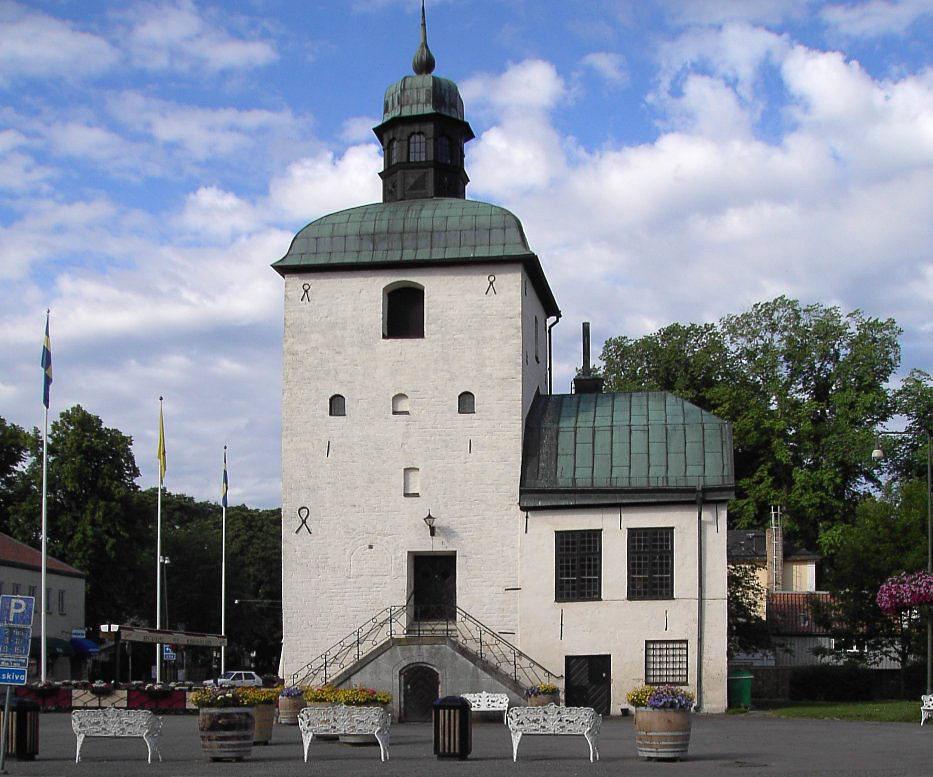
- Vadstena Town Hall is the oldest in Sweden

- Location within Östergötland Location within Sweden
- Coordinates: 58°27′N 14°54′E
- Country: Sweden
- Province: Östergötland
- County: Östergötland County
- Municipality: Vadstena Municipality

Area
  - Total: 3.41 km^{2} (1.32 sq mi)

Population (2023)
  - Total: 5,802
  - Density: 1,645/km^{2} (4,260/sq mi)
- Time zone: UTC+1 (CET)
  - Summer (DST): UTC+2 (CEST)

Vadstena (Swedish pronunciation: [ˈvâsːˌteːna]) is a locality and the seat of Vadstena Municipality, Östergötland County, Sweden, with 5,802 inhabitants in 2023. From 1974 to 1979 Vadstena was administered as part of Motala Municipality.

Despite its small population, Vadstena is, for historical reasons, still referred to as a city: though it received its city privileges in 1400), Statistics Sweden only counts as cities Swedish urban localities with more than 10,000 inhabitants.

== History ==
Above all, the city of Vadstena is noted for two important facts of Swedish history. It was in Vadstena, in the late 14th century, that Saint Bridget of Sweden founded the first monastery of her Bridgettine Order, and Vadstena Castle is one of Sweden's best-preserved castles from the era of Gustav Vasa in the 16th century, when Sweden became Protestant. Today the remaining buildings of the monastery are occupied by a museum (Sancta Birgitta Klostermuseum) and a hotel, (Vadstena Klosterhotel), and the castle houses the provincial archives and a museum of 16th and 17th century furniture, portraits and paintings.

Since the 16th century, Vadstena has been the location of a hospital. Earlier in history, it mainly housed mental patients. Today, some of the oldest buildings present the Vadstena Hospital Museum.

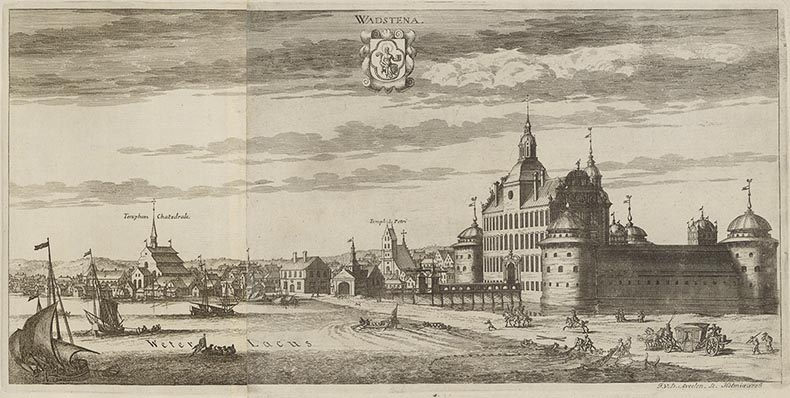
Vadstena in Suecia antiqua et hodierna, c 1700

The buildings in the city centre date mainly from the 16th, 17th and 18th centuries. The old town is well preserved and the streets have not changed much over the centuries. The Town Hall is Sweden's oldest, dating back to the early 15th century. Notable is the main street (Storgatan) where all the shops are gathered, as they would have been during the Middle Ages.

The botanist Erik Acharius died in Vadstena (1819).

== Railway ==
Vadstena also preserves elements of more recent history in the museum of the Vadstena-Fågelsta narrow gauge railway (Wadstena Fogelsta Järnväg). This 891 mm (or Swedish three foot) railway was once part of a large network of narrow-gauge railways in Östergötland constructed in the latter part of the 19th century.

== Famous people ==
- Stina Blackstenius, Swedish footballer
- Nina Koppang, Swedish handball player

== Gallery ==
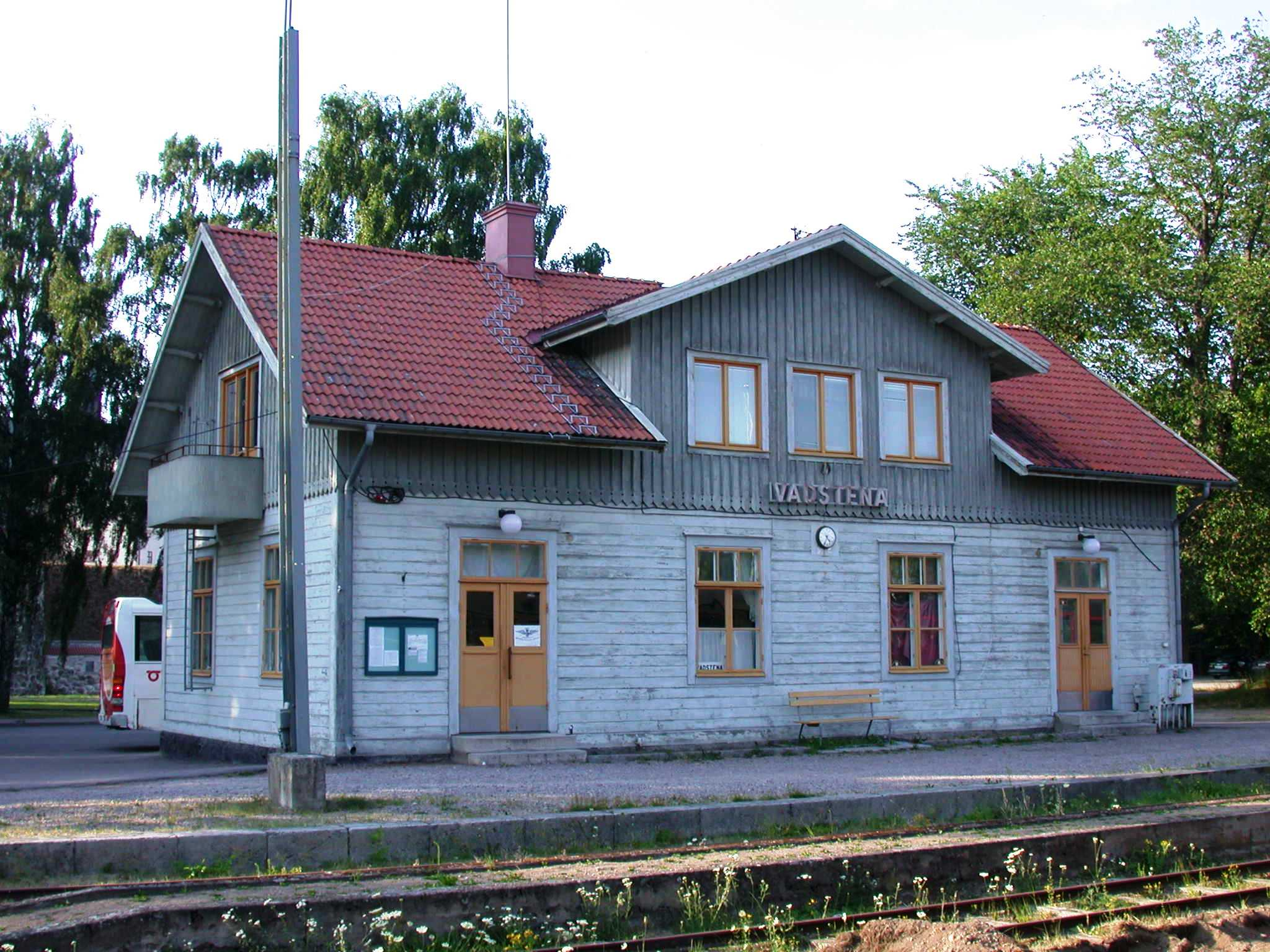
Vadstena station

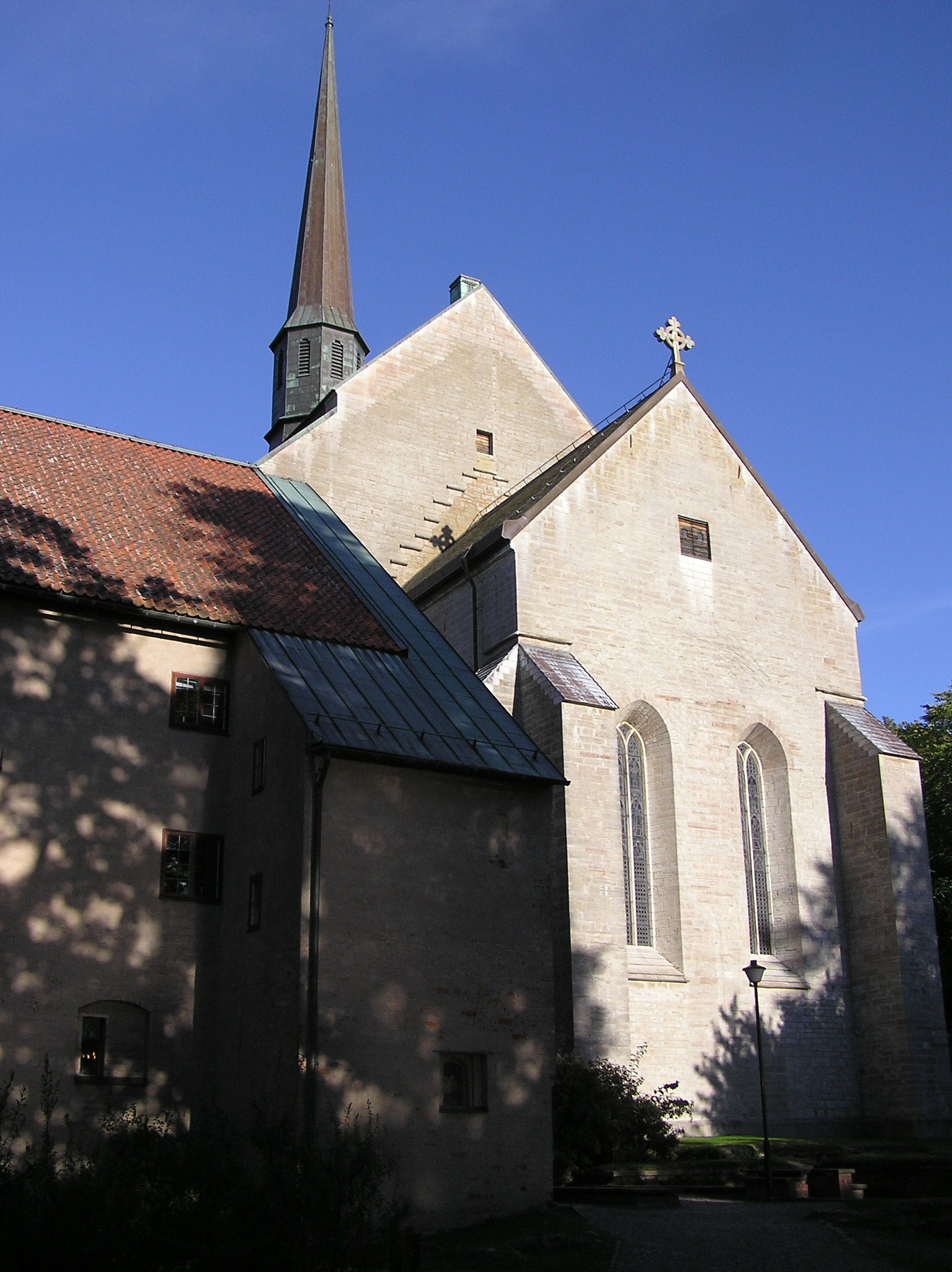
Vadstena Abbey Church

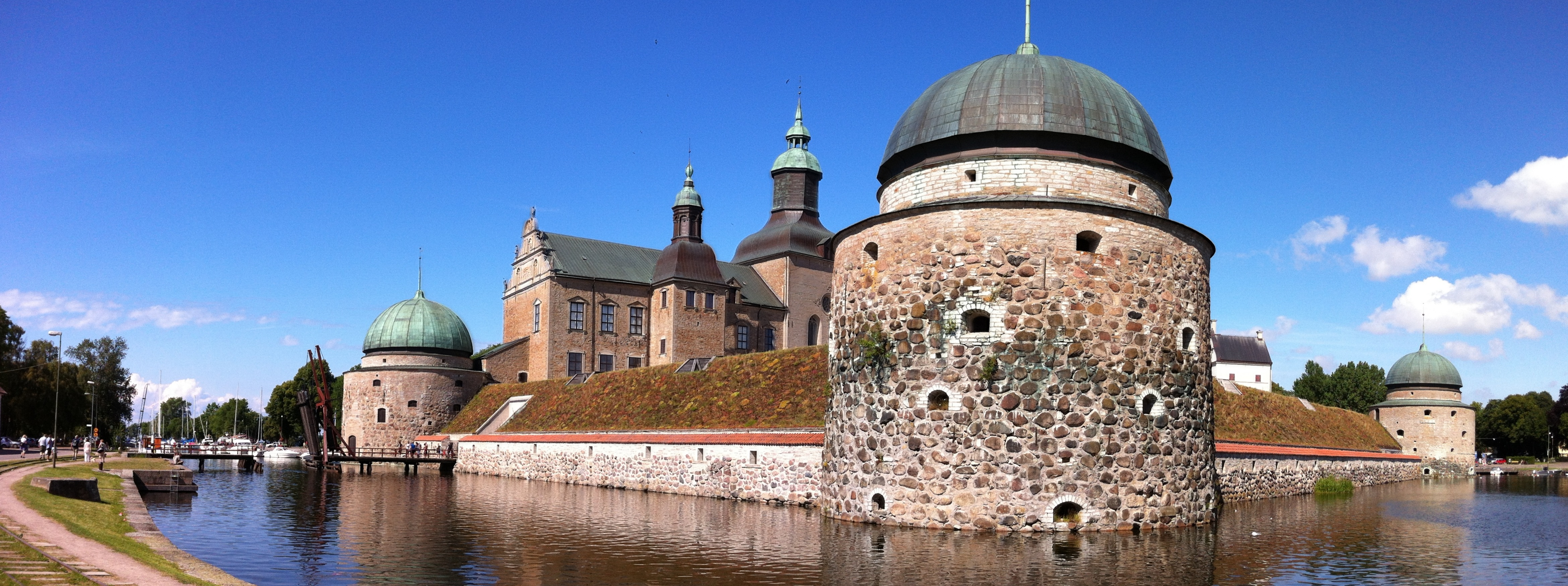
Vadstena Castle
