= Nykyrka =

- Location within Östergötland Location within Sweden
- Coordinates: 58°37′N 14°58′E
- Country: Sweden
- Province: Östergötland
- County: Östergötland County
- Municipality: Motala Municipality

Area
  - Total: 0.50 km^{2} (0.19 sq mi)

Population (31 December 2010)
  - Total: 414
  - Density: 832/km^{2} (2,150/sq mi)
- Time zone: UTC+1 (CET)
  - Summer (DST): UTC+2 (CEST)

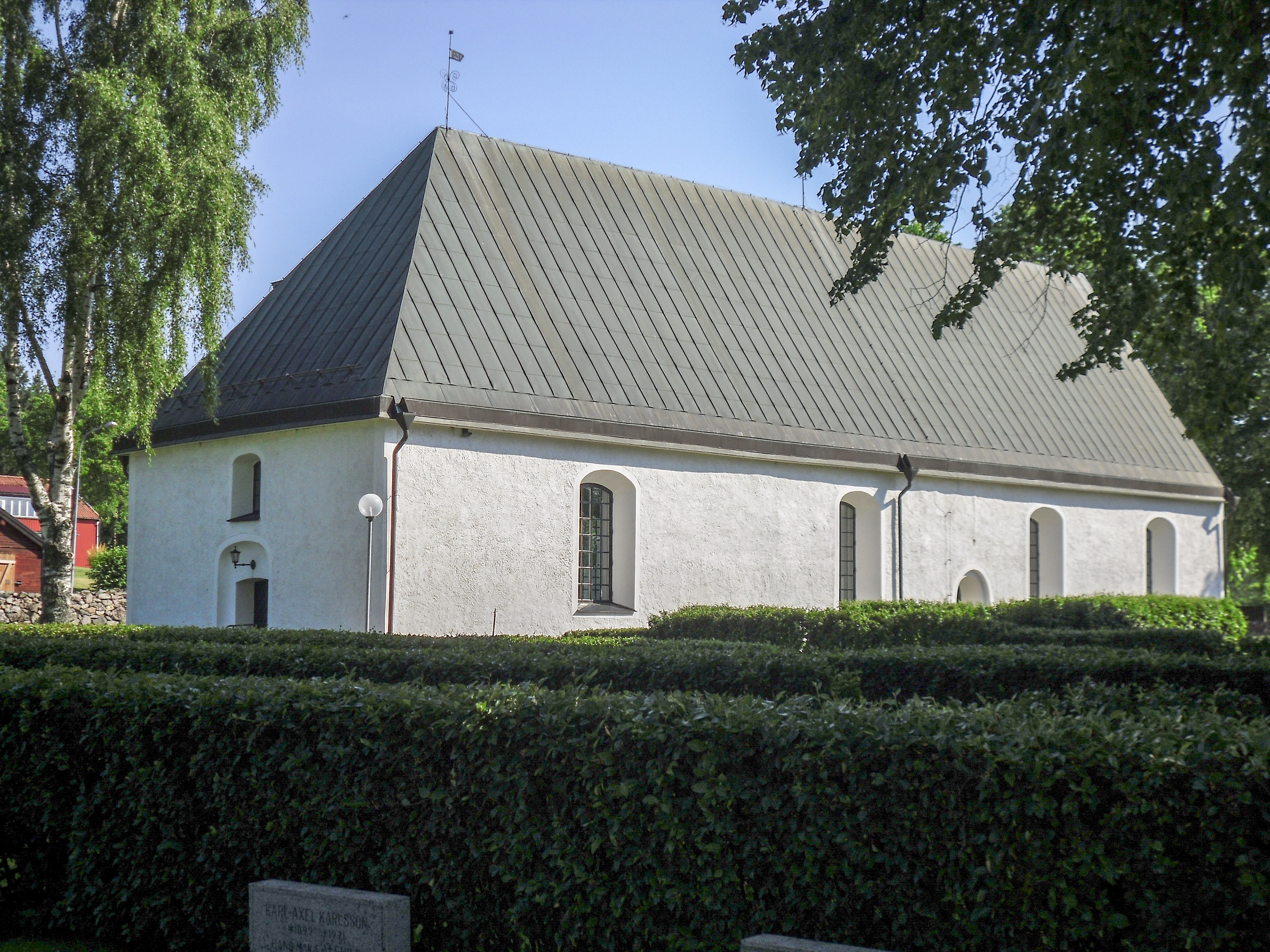
Western New Church, Nykyrka, Motala, Sweden

Nykyrka is a locality situated in Motala Municipality, Östergötland County, Sweden with 414 inhabitants in 2010.
