= Klockrike =

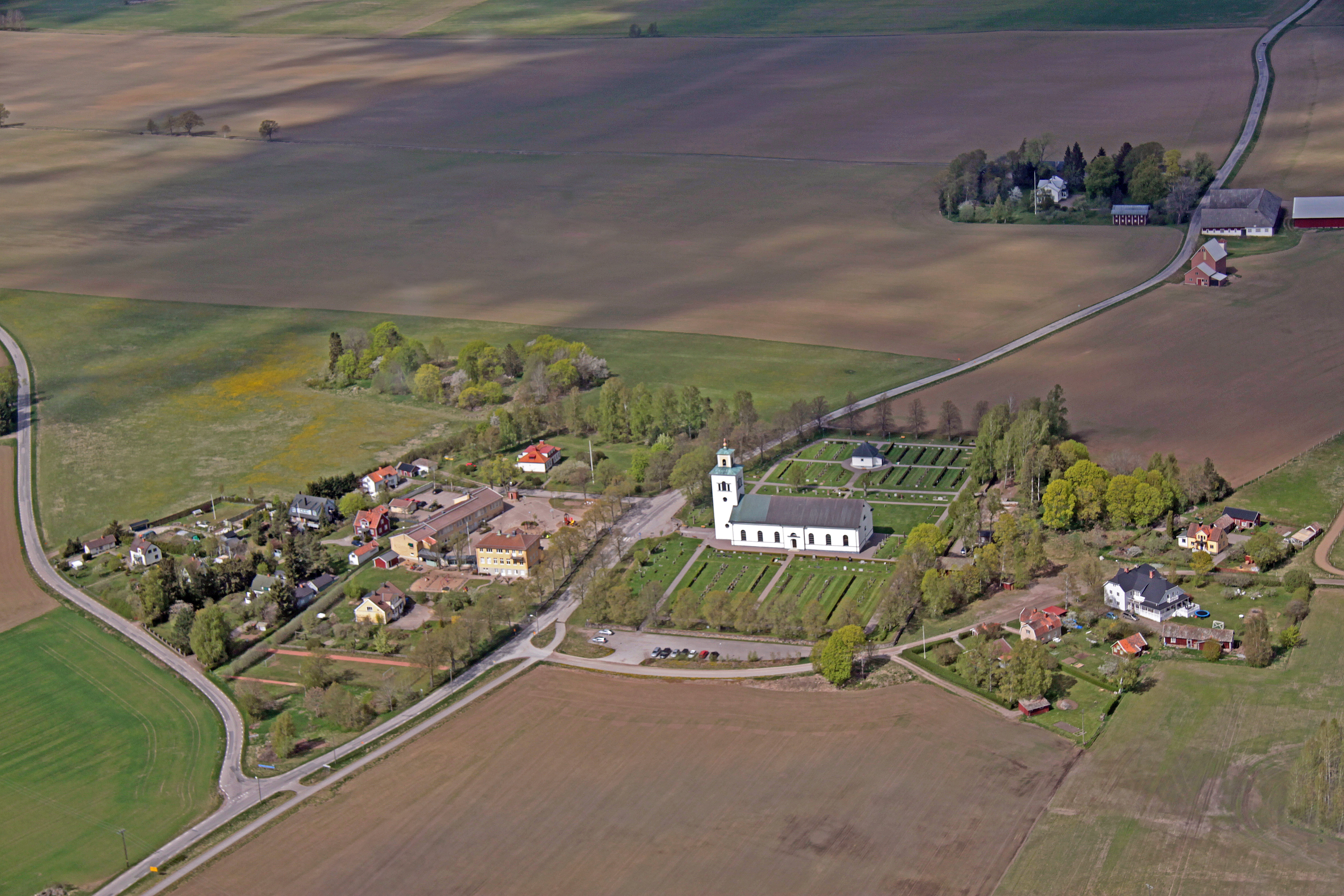

- Location within Östergötland Location within Sweden
- Coordinates: 58°30′N 15°20′E
- Country: Sweden
- Province: Östergötland
- County: Östergötland County
- Municipality: Motala Municipality

Area
  - Total: 0.52 km^{2} (0.20 sq mi)

Population (31 December 2010)
  - Total: 272
  - Density: 527/km^{2} (1,360/sq mi)
- Time zone: UTC+1 (CET)
  - Summer (DST): UTC+2 (CEST)

Klockrike is a locality situated in Motala Municipality, Östergötland County, Sweden with 272 inhabitants in 2010.
