= Godegård =

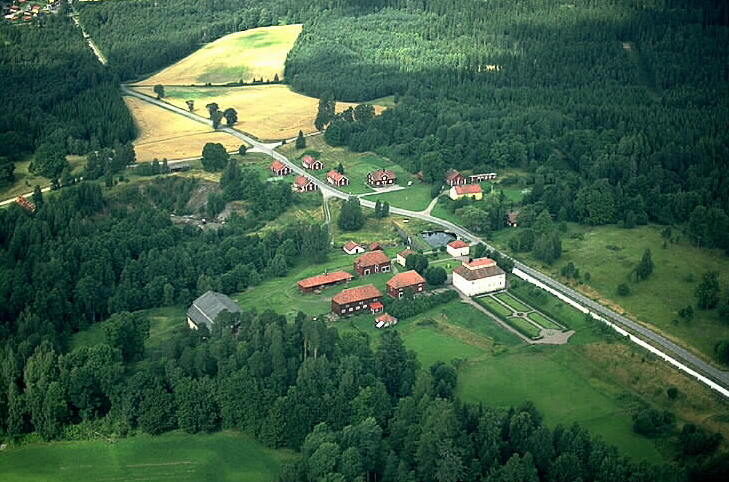

- Location within Östergötland Location within Sweden
- Coordinates: 58°44′N 15°09′E
- Country: Sweden
- Province: Östergötland
- County: Östergötland County
- Municipality: Motala Municipality

Area
  - Total: 0.26 km^{2} (0.10 sq mi)

Population (31 December 2010)
  - Total: 200
  - Density: 772/km^{2} (2,000/sq mi)
- Time zone: UTC+1 (CET)
  - Summer (DST): UTC+2 (CEST)

Godegård is a locality situated in Motala Municipality, Östergötland County, Sweden with 200 inhabitants in 2010. The Mjölby-Hallsberg railway line runs through the village.
