= Fornåsa =

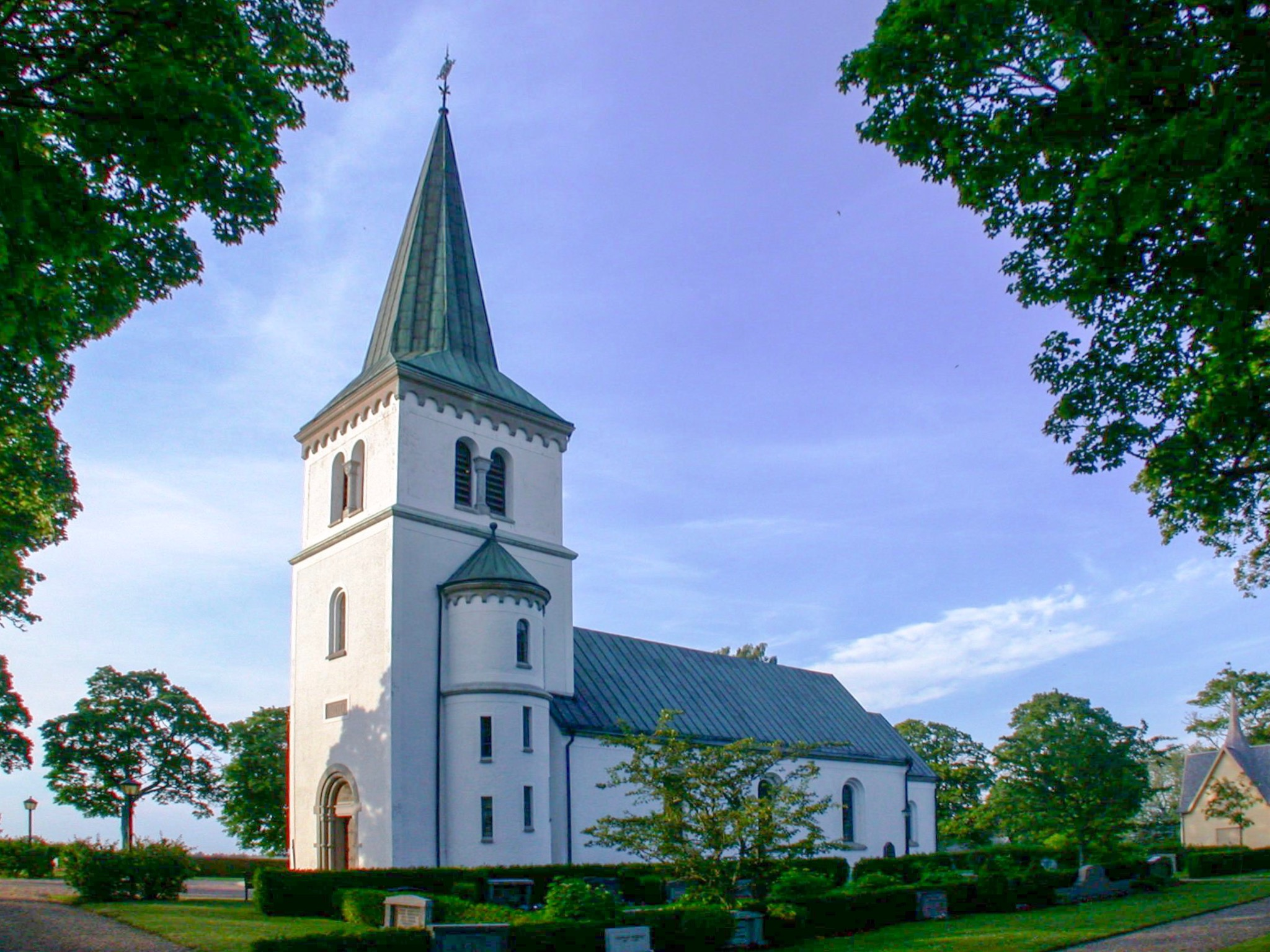
- Fornåsa church Motala Sweden

- Location within Östergötland Location within Sweden
- Coordinates: 58°29′N 15°14′E
- Country: Sweden
- Province: Östergötland
- County: Östergötland County
- Municipality: Motala Municipality

Area
  - Total: 0.47 km^{2} (0.18 sq mi)

Population (31 December 2010)
  - Total: 433
  - Density: 917/km^{2} (2,380/sq mi)
- Time zone: UTC+1 (CET)
  - Summer (DST): UTC+2 (CEST)

Fornåsa is a locality situated in Motala Municipality, Östergötland County, Sweden with 433 inhabitants in 2010.
