= Medevi =

Coordinates: 58°40′N 14°57′E

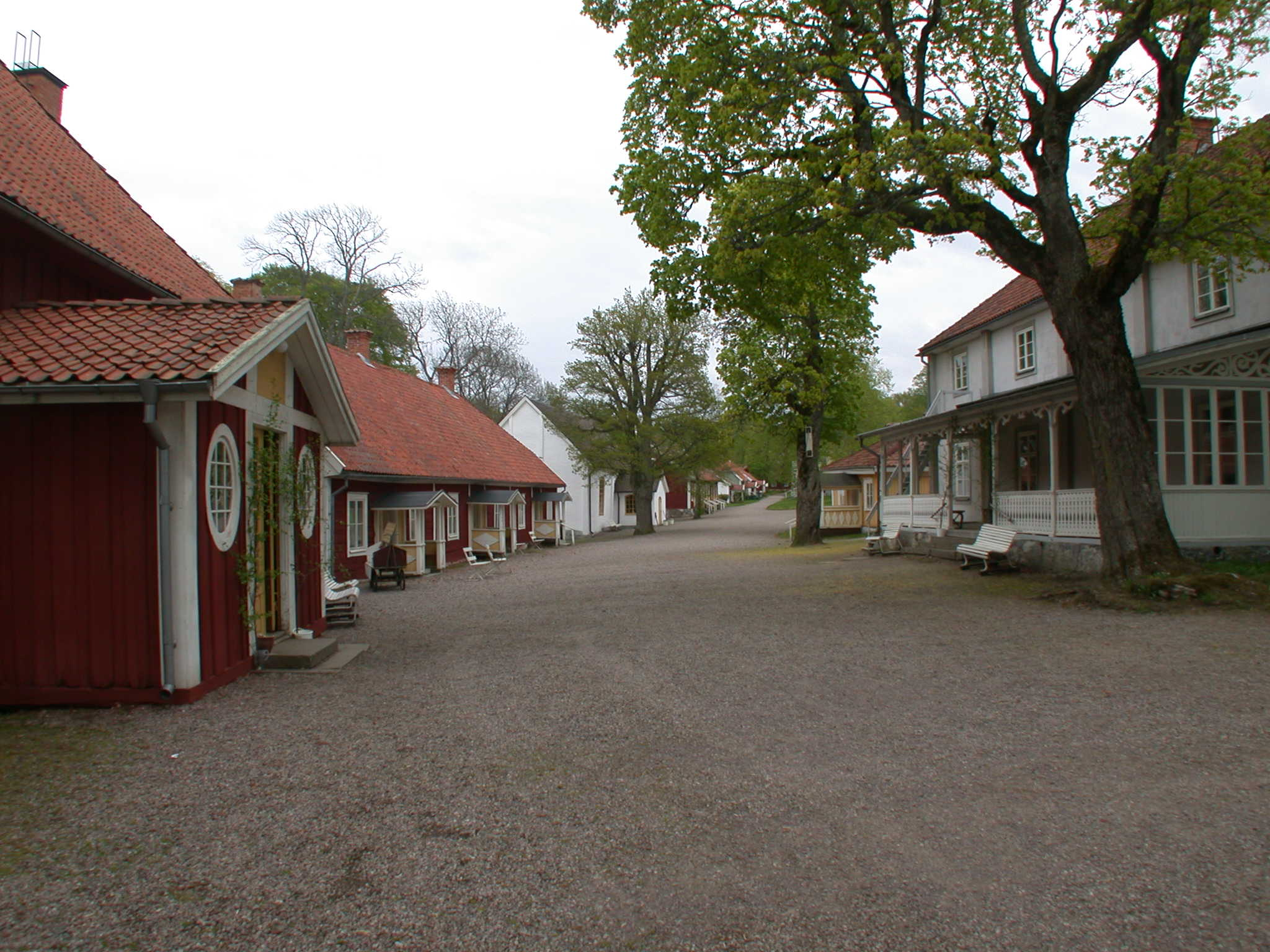
Medevi 2006

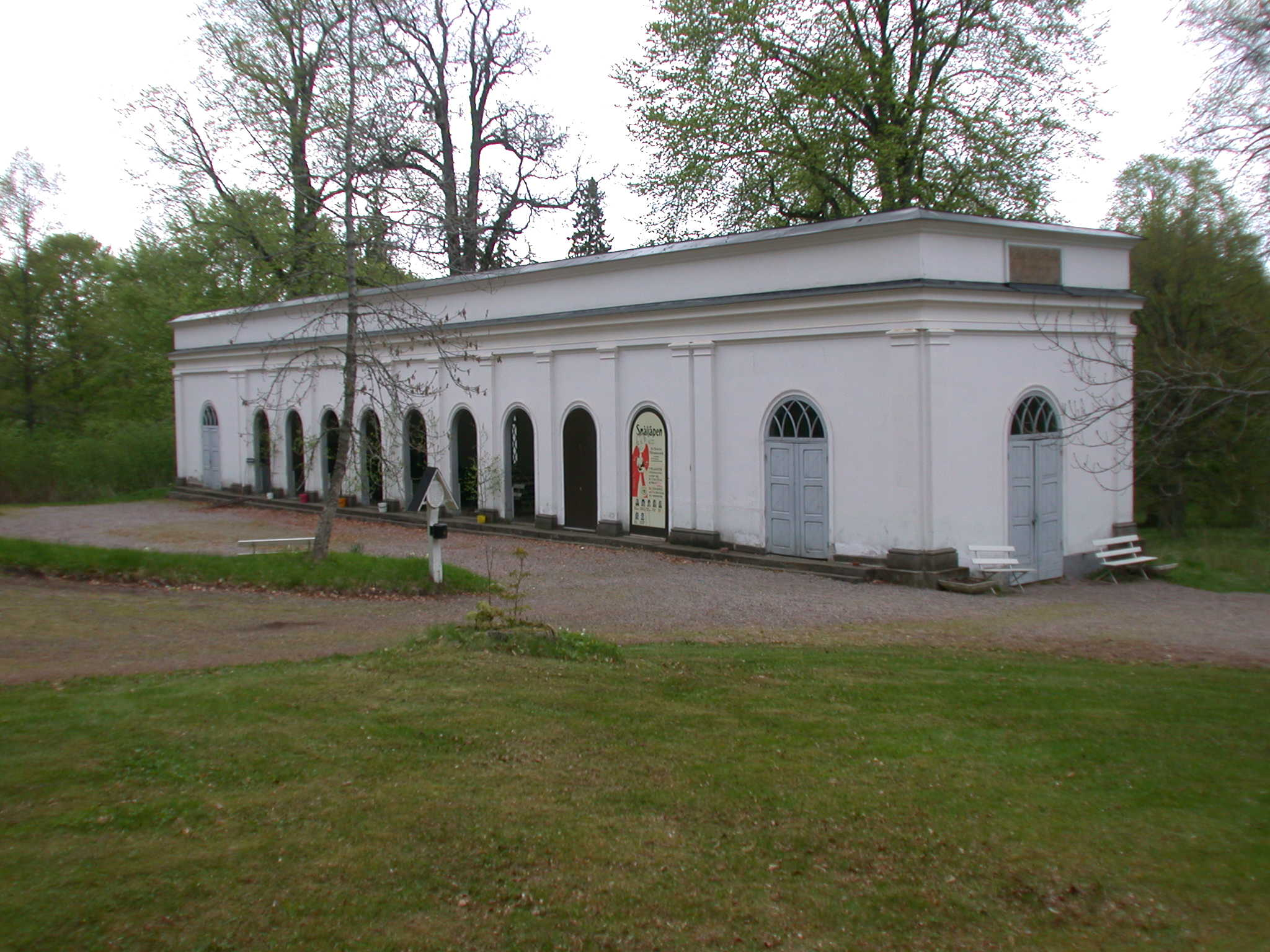
Health spa building

Medevi Brunn is Scandinavia's oldest spa, located in Motala Municipality on the eastern shore of Lake Vättern, in north-west Östergötland, Sweden.

== History ==
The spa was founded in 1678 by Count Gustaf Soop and the royal doctor Urban Hjärne. Queen Hedvig Eleonora had a summer residence built at Medevi säteri, on the hills overlooking the village, at the recommendation of Hjärne.

Since then, people have been coming to Medevi every summer to cure themselves from ailments by drinking the mineral water and by covering themselves in mud wraps. Most buildings date back to the 18th and 19th centuries. The health center was closed in 1982, but the water is still served to visitors in the summer.

== Today ==
Medevi has become one of the most popular resorts to celebrate the Scandinavian summer holiday of midsummer. During the midsummer weekend, daily visitors in the village often number over 10,000. The area surrounding Medevi has seen a dramatic increase in the construction of summer residences, some of which have been turned into year-round housing. The nearby beach village of Västanvik alone has over 500 such residences. Two confirmation camps are held every year, run by Hans Rhodin. Sweden's upper class 15-year-olds come for three-week stays.

== Notable people ==
- Alexander Bard, artist and philosopher, was born in Medevi, 1961
