= Trollhätte Canal =

Canal in Sweden

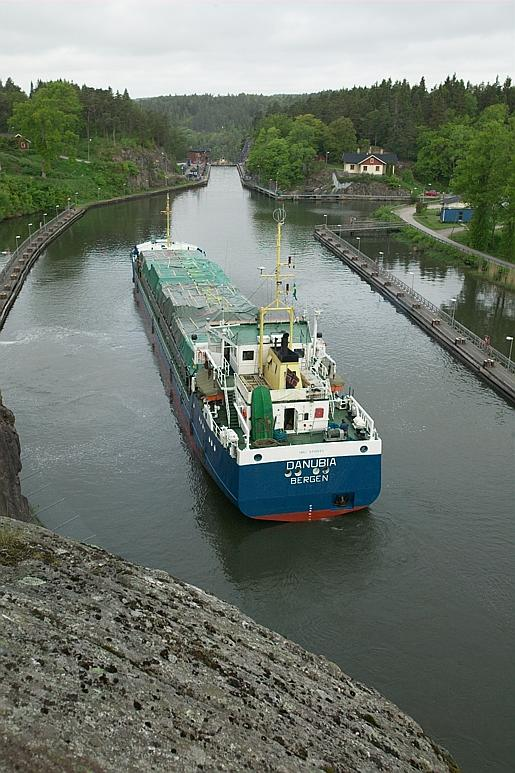
- Interactive map of Trollhätte Canal
- Location: Västra Götaland County
- Country: Sweden

Specifications
- Maximum boat length: 88 m
- Maximum boat beam: 13.20
- Maximum boat draft: 5.40
- Minimum boat air draft: 27 m
- Locks: 6
- Total rise: 44

History
- Date of first use: 1800

Geography
- Beginning coordinates: 58.387404°N 12.315920°E
- Ending coordinates: 57.6827°N 11.8535°E

The Trollhätte Canal (Swedish: Trollhätte kanal) is a canal in Sweden. Trollhätte Canal connects the Göta river with the lake Vänern. The canal was opened in 1800. In 2004, the canal was proclaimed a national monument.

The Trollhätte Canal and the Göta Canal form a greater 390 km long waterway connecting the Kattegatt area of the North Sea and the Baltic Sea through the territory of Sweden. This waterway was dubbed as Sweden's Blue Ribbon (Swedish: Sveriges Blå Band). Contrary to the popular belief, it is not correct to consider this waterway as a part of the greater Göta Canal. The Trollhätte Canal and the Göta Canal are completely separate entities.

== Description ==
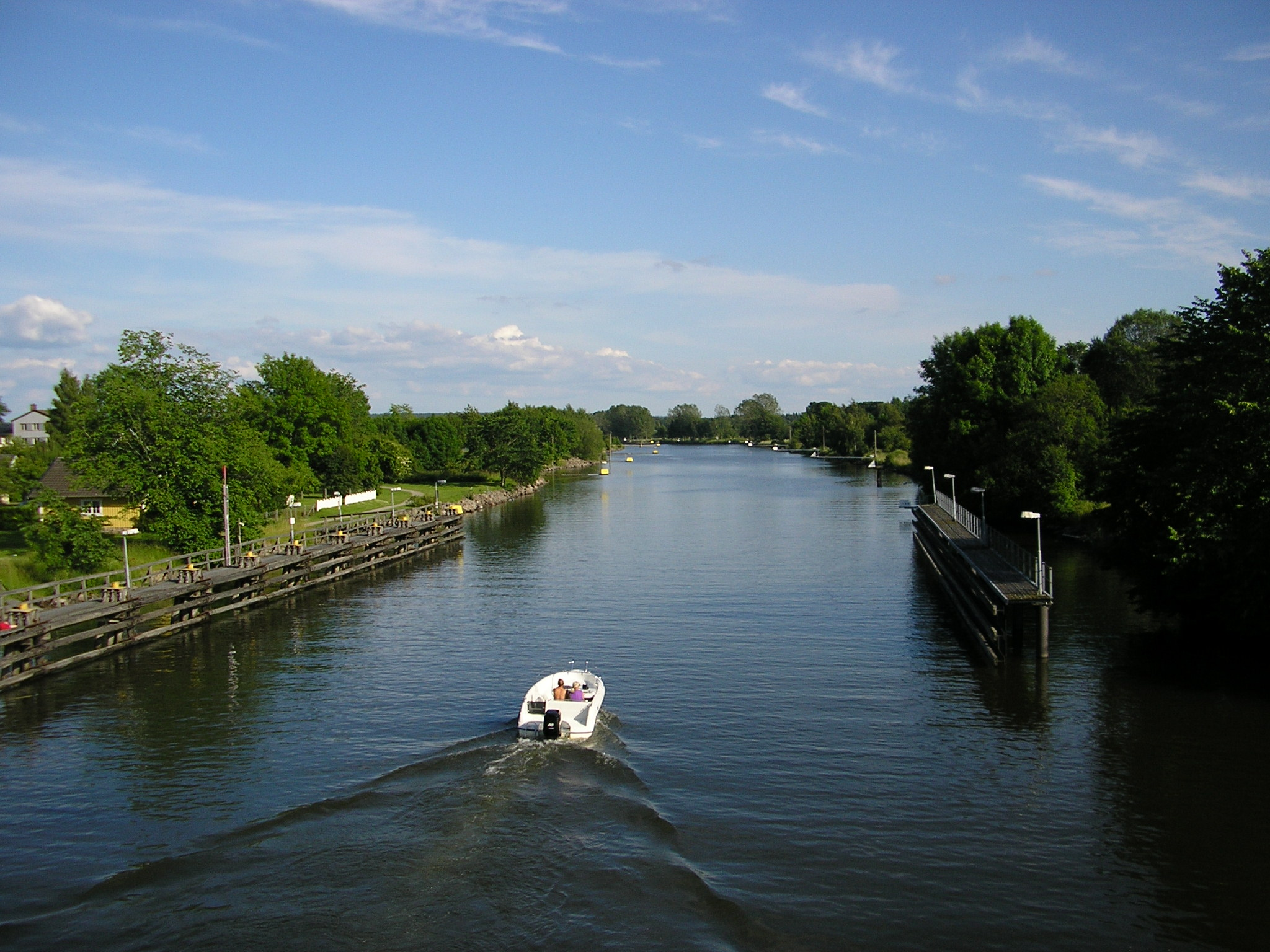
Karls grav – part of the Trollhätte Canal

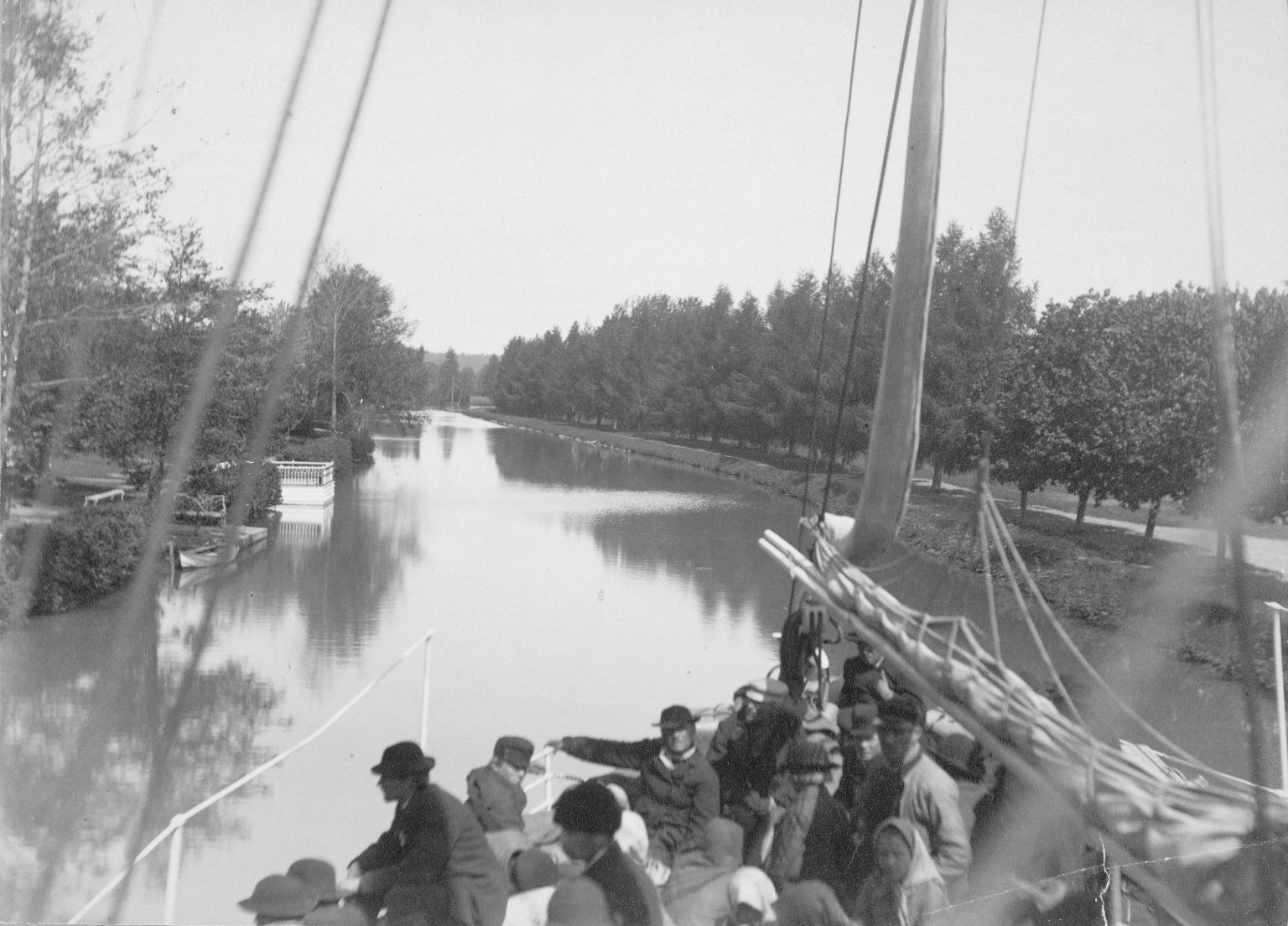
Trollhätte Canal, from an albumen print taken ca. 1865-1895

The Trollhätte Canal is 82 km long, albeit only 10 km of it is manmade, the rest of its watercourse it was laid out through the riverbed of the Göta Älv river. The highest point of the Trollhätte Canal is at the Lake Vänern – 44.10 m a.s.l.

The canal has six locks (downstream towards Gothenburg):

1. Brinkebergskulle sluss (6 m) – Vänersborg
2. Tvåan (9 m) – Trollhättan upper
3-5. Slusstrappan (23 m) – Trollhättan lower, triple lock staircase
6. Ströms sluss (6 m) – Lilla Edet, 49 km from Göteborg

=== Cargo traffic ===
The canal is open for cargo traffic nearly all year round except short periods in winter when its locks are subject to maintenance or affected by ice.

The canal allows ships up to 4000 tonnes to pass through. However the statistics show that from the beginning of the 21st century the cargo traffic through the canal is in steady decline: in 2015 the volume of freight transferred through the canal amounted to 1.5 million tonnes while in 1990 it was as large as 3.5 million tonnes. A relevant study suggests this decline is due to a number of factors. One of them is competition from road and rail transportation, but another is due to the constraints of the current infrastructure of the canal.

The current locks of the canal were built in 1916. They are not large enough for modern day freighters, thus they do not have sufficient throughput capacity. Another factor is the age of the locks per se. They were built using technology and materials more than a hundred years ago. Despite regular maintenance they struggle to sustain the effects of water and ice. It is estimated that the locks could not be safely used after 2030.

In this regard the Swedish transport authorities are planning in 2025-2026 to proceed with the renovation of the canal infrastructure which is to be finished in 2030-2032.

=== Watercraft measurements ===
Ships classified as Vänermax are of the maximal measurements that will fit through the canal as follows:

- Length: 88 m
- Beam: 13.40 m
- Draft: 5.40 m
- Vertical clearance: 27 m
