= Ulvåsa =

Mansion outside Motala, Östergötland, Sweden

Coordinates: 58°33′13″N 15°09′00″E

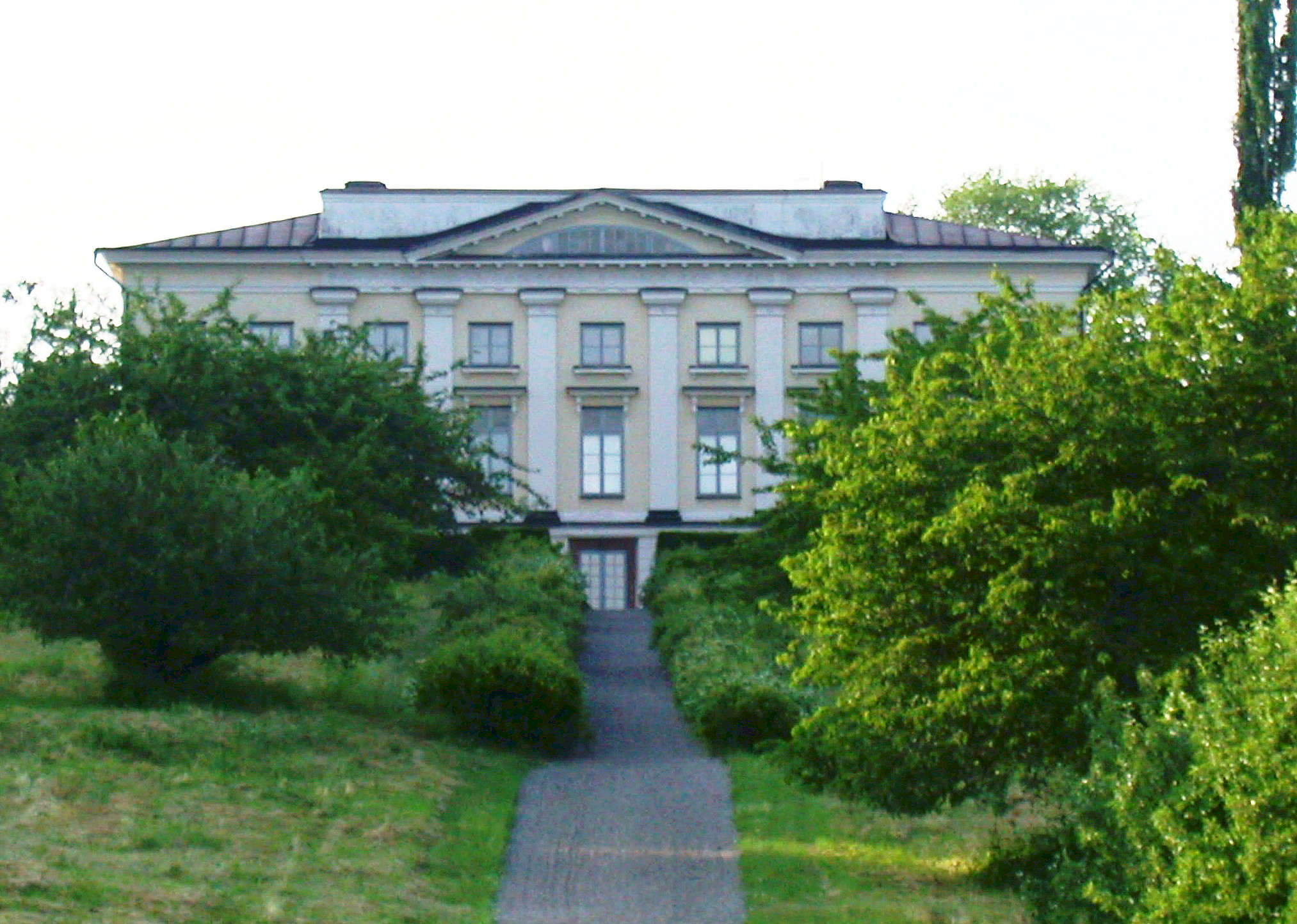
Ulvåsa Mansion

Ulvåsa, or Ulfåsa, is a mansion by lake Boren outside Motala in Östergötland, Sweden. The construction of the present mansion began in the 16th century. In the early 19th century a third floor was added and it obtained its present architecture.

The medieval Ulvåsa was situated a few kilometres west of the present mansion. Today, there are ruins left of the manor where Saint Bridget of Sweden lived most of her life. After the death of her husband the manor was abandoned and a new residence was built at Brittås, 1 km south of the current mansion.

The mansion is a private residence and is not open to the public. A walking trail circles the mansion and leads through the English park, which is open to the public all year.
