= Viken (lake) =

Body of water

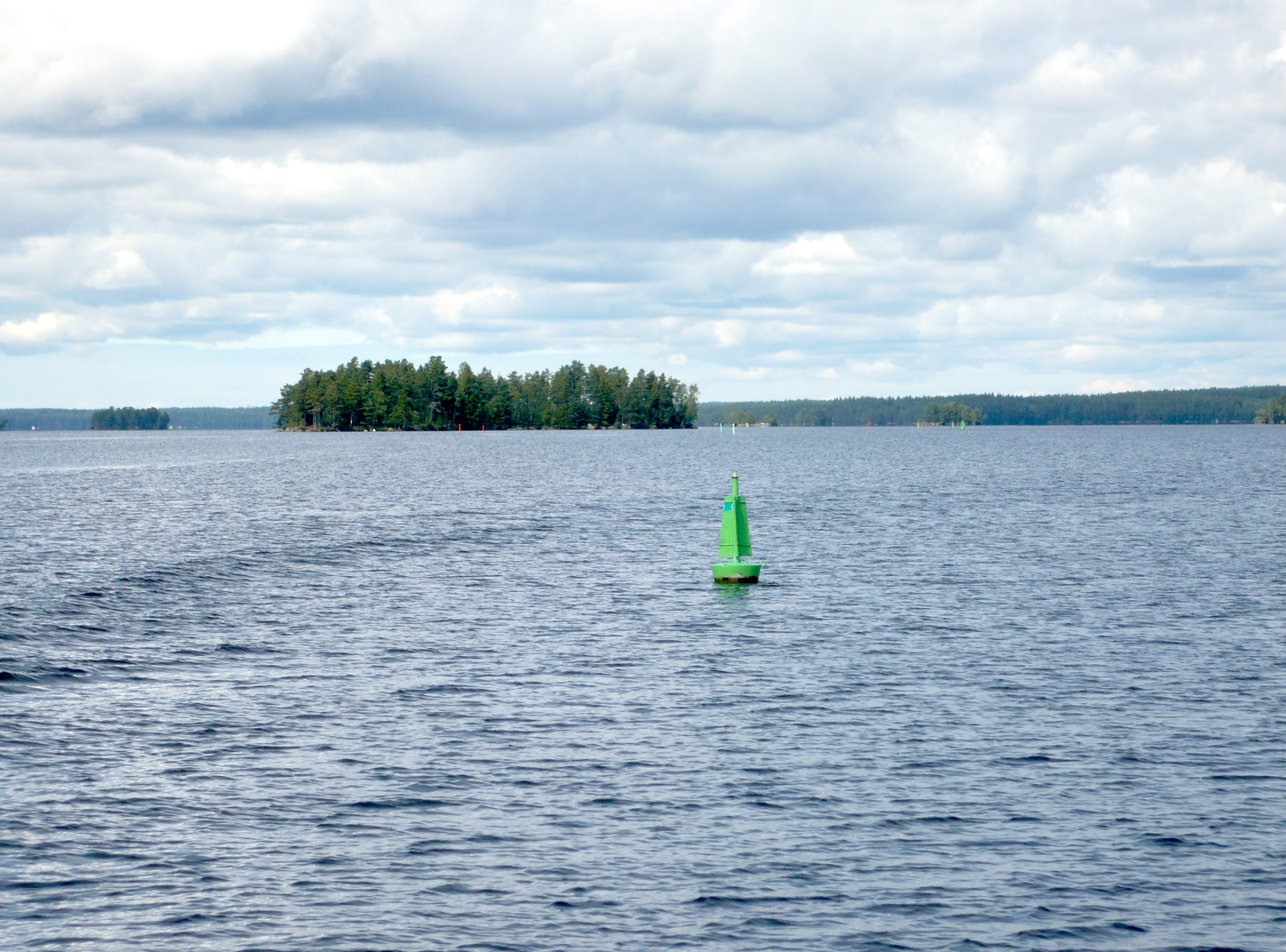

- Location within Västra Götaland Location within Sweden
- Coordinates: 58.62441°N 14.29375°E

Viken is a lake in Sweden. It is located in Västra Götaland County, where it straddles the border between Karlsborg and Töreboda municipalities.

The lake is a part of the Göta canal, where it reaches its highest point – 91.8 m a.s.l.
