= Birgittas udde =

Coordinates: 58.56520°N 15.13505°E

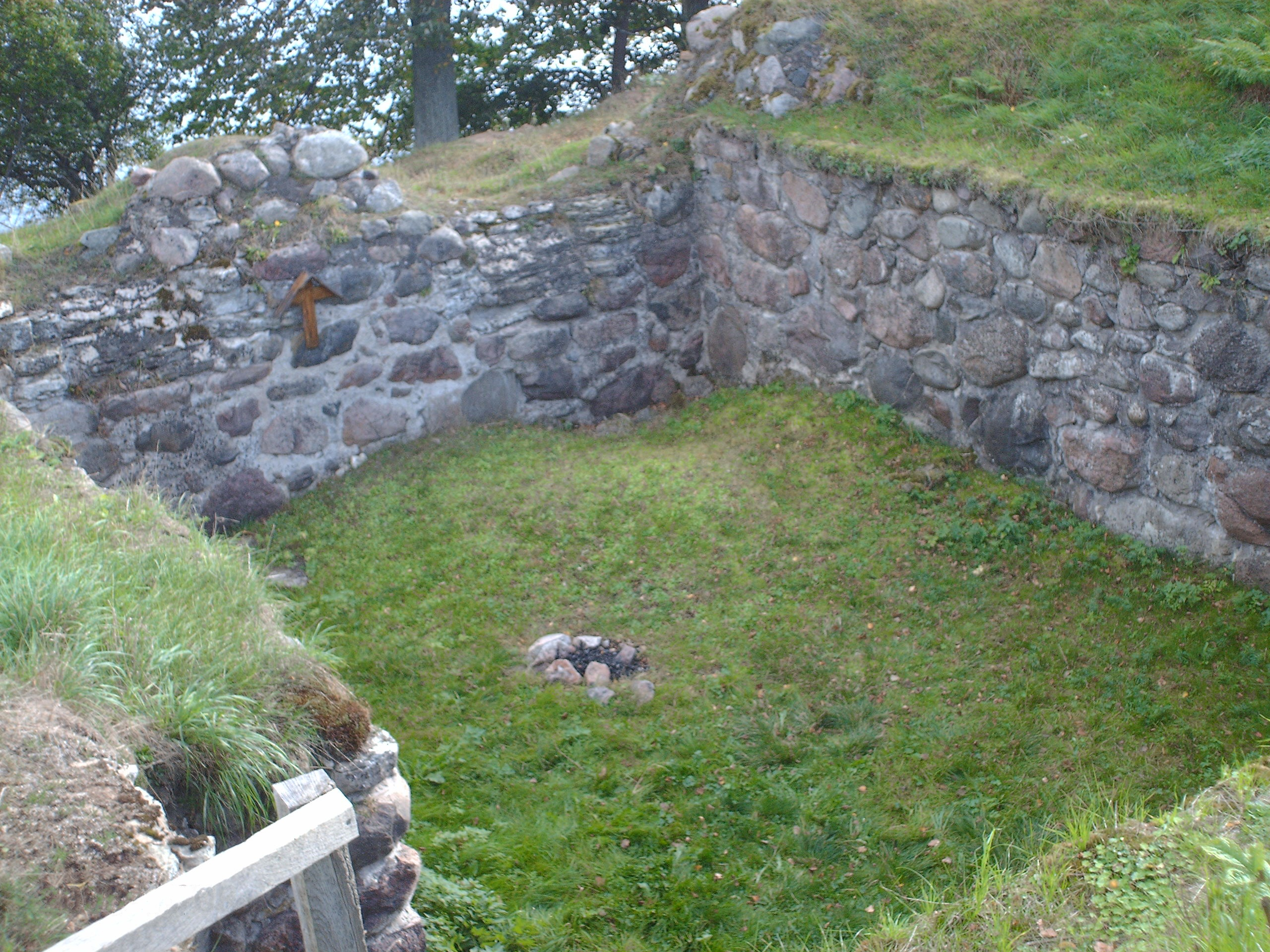
The ruins.

Birgittas udde ("Birgitta's Point") is situated on the south shore of lake Boren, Motala, Sweden. Medieval ruins of the Ulvåsa Manor House where St Birgitta lived most of her life. Next to the point, lies the modern Ulvåsa Castle.
