= Vadstena Town Hall =

Coordinates: 58.4472°N 14.8876°E

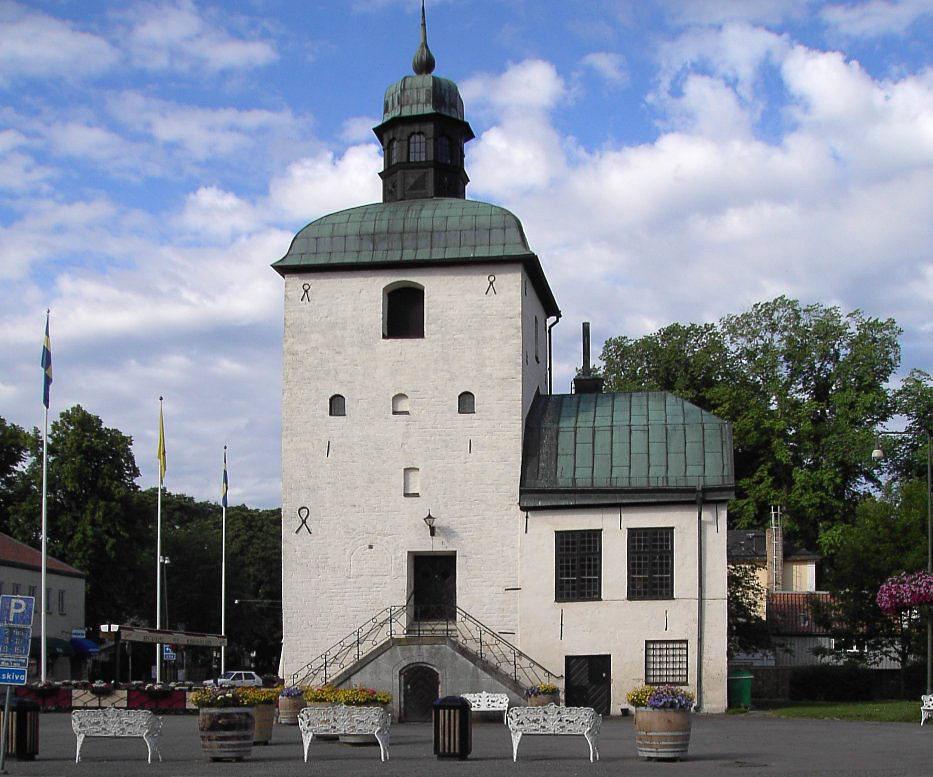
Vadstena Town Hall

Vadstena Town Hall (Swedish: Vadstena rådhus) is a former town hall in Vadstena, Sweden. It is the oldest preserved town hall in Sweden.

== History and architecture ==
The town hall is the oldest surviving town hall in Sweden. It was built during the 15th and 16th centuries. It is located on Rådhustorget, the oldest square of Vadstena which derives its name from the town hall.

The square itself is mentioned in written sources for the first time in the early 15th century, and the construction of the town hall started after Vadstena was granted town privileges by Queen Margaret.

The building comprises three distinct parts: the actual town hall, facing east; a tower; and a northern wing. The oldest part is the part facing east. Its construction date is referred to as 1490 in several sources; however, dendrochronological examination of a wooden beam in the building has concluded that the wood was felled before 1454–55. Possible explanations may be that older wood was re-used when building the town hall, or that the town hall was substantially rebuilt after a fire which destroyed much of Vadstena in 1487. The tower of the town hall is presumed to have been built at the beginning of the 16th century, and reflects a Northern German fashion of adorning town halls with an impressive tower. The spire and lantern of the tower dates from 1691 and replaced earlier crow-stepped gables. In its present appearance, the northern wing of the town hall dates from 1728, when it replaced an earlier annex dating from 1567. In connection with this, the whole town hall was rebuilt and acquired the appearance it still largely has. Later alterations include changes made to the roof in 1776 and again in the 19th century, and refurbishments carried out in 1915, 1958 and 1962. In connection with the installation of public toilets on the square in front of the town hall, an archaeological examination was carried out in 2014.

The town hall was the seat of the local government until the 1970s, but lost its jurisdiction and function as a town court in 1948. Today it is occasionally used for art exhibitions and also houses a restaurant. The tower of the town hall at one point contained the town jail, and historical records also note that the town executioner lived in a building adjacent to the town hall.
