= Vadstena Municipality =

Vadstena Municipality Vadstena kommun
- Municipality
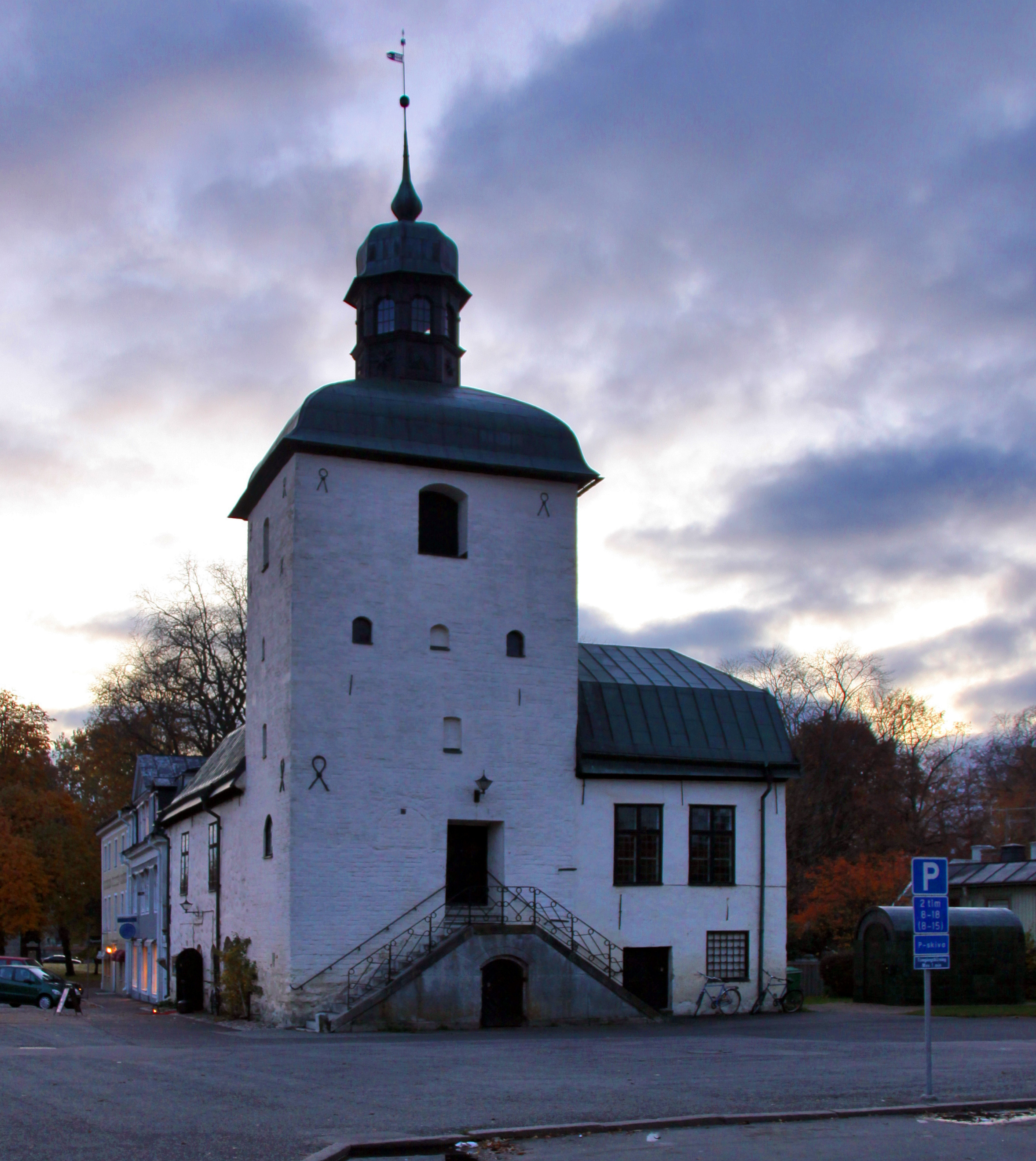
- Vadstena Town Hall

- Coat of arms

- Coordinates: 58°27′N 14°54′E
- Country: Sweden
- County: Östergötland County
- Seat: Vadstena

Area
  - Total: 413.259725 km^{2} (159.560472 sq mi)
  - Land: 181.839725 km^{2} (70.208710 sq mi)
  - Water: 231.42 km^{2} (89.35 sq mi)
- Area as of 1 January 2014.

Population (30 June 2025)
  - Total: 7,533
  - Density: 41.43/km^{2} (107.3/sq mi)
- Time zone: UTC+1 (CET)
  - Summer (DST): UTC+2 (CEST)
- ISO 3166 code: SE
- Province: Östergötland
- Municipal code: 0584
- Website: www.vadstena.se

Vadstena Municipality (Swedish: Vadstena kommun) is a municipality in Östergötland County in southeast Sweden. Its seat is located in the city of Vadstena.

The old City of Vadstena was during the nationwide local government reform of the 1970s merged into Motala Municipality in 1974. This "marriage" was unsuccessful and a "divorce" was soon agreed upon and in 1980 the present municipality was created. It contains, however, 12 original units.

== Demographics ==
This is a demographic table based on Vadstena Municipality's electoral districts in the 2022 Swedish general election sourced from SVT's election platform, in turn taken from SCB official statistics.

In total there were 7,517 residents, including 6,185 Swedish citizens of voting age. 48.1% voted for the left coalition and 51.2% for the right coalition. Indicators are in percentage points except population totals and income.

Location	Residents	Citizen adults	Left vote	Right vote	Employed	Swedish parents	Foreign heritage	Income SEK	Degree
Location			%	%					
Birgitta, Haga, Hagebyhösa, Hov	1,716	1,448	45.4	54.2	83	92	8	25,737	40
Borghamn, Skedet, Rogslösa	1,006	838	41.9	56.8	81	91	9	25,046	39
Gamla Söder-Nya Söder-Hertigen	2,051	1,604	48.9	50.8	85	90	10	27,108	33
Innerstaden	1,295	1,148	50.0	49.0	81	91	9	23,828	50
Kvissberg, Borgmästarområdet	1,449	1,147	52.6	46.6	76	83	17	21,351	27
Source: SVT

== Nature ==
Vadstena is situated by lake Vättern, Sweden's second largest lake. Fishing was an important source of food when the town was first founded around the year 1000 AD, and it continued to be dependent on fish and ship merchandise.

There are two nature reserves in the municipality:

- The Ombergsliden, 230,000 m^{2} large, a lime-rich marsh. It has several notable plants, such as the uncommon orchid Tuber geophyte (Gymnadenia odoratissima), and the carnivorous Butterwort plant.
- The Kastad kulle torräng is a drumlin rich on lime, and hosts several plants otherwise not found in the area, such as the Oxytropis pilosa, otherwise very sparsely outside of Gotland.

== Sights ==
- Vadstena Castle
- Vadstena Abbey
- The Vadstena Hospital area and museum with buildings from the 16th century to the 20th century.
- Herrestad Church, inaugurated in 1112, which makes it one of the oldest dated stone churches in Sweden (the Holy Cross Church in Dalby, Skåne, Sweden was built "around" 1060). The church tower was constructed around a century later, and is largely unmodified throughout the centuries.
- Rogslösa Church, from the 13th century, which is especially notable for its ornaments of Celtic influences.
- There are also other interesting medieval churches in the municipality, such as Hagebyhöga Church, Väversunda Church, Hov Church, Örberga Church and Nässja Church. Most of these were begun on in the 12th century.
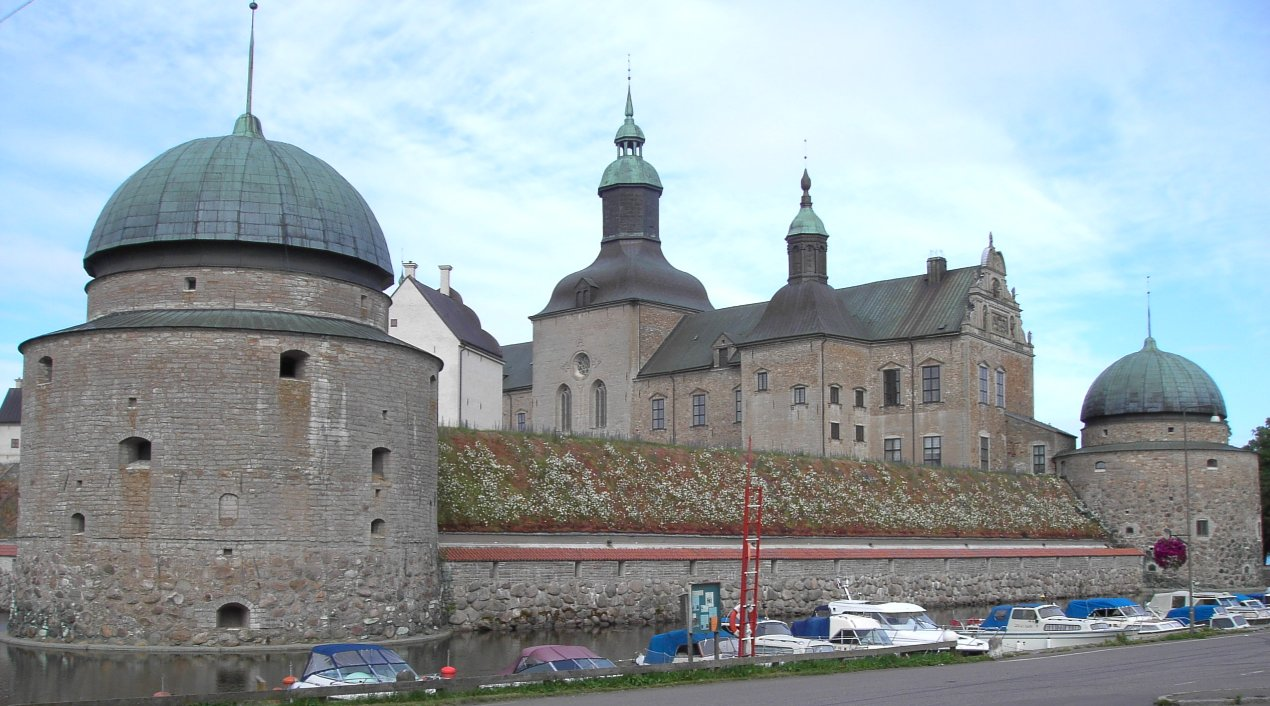
Vadstena Castle

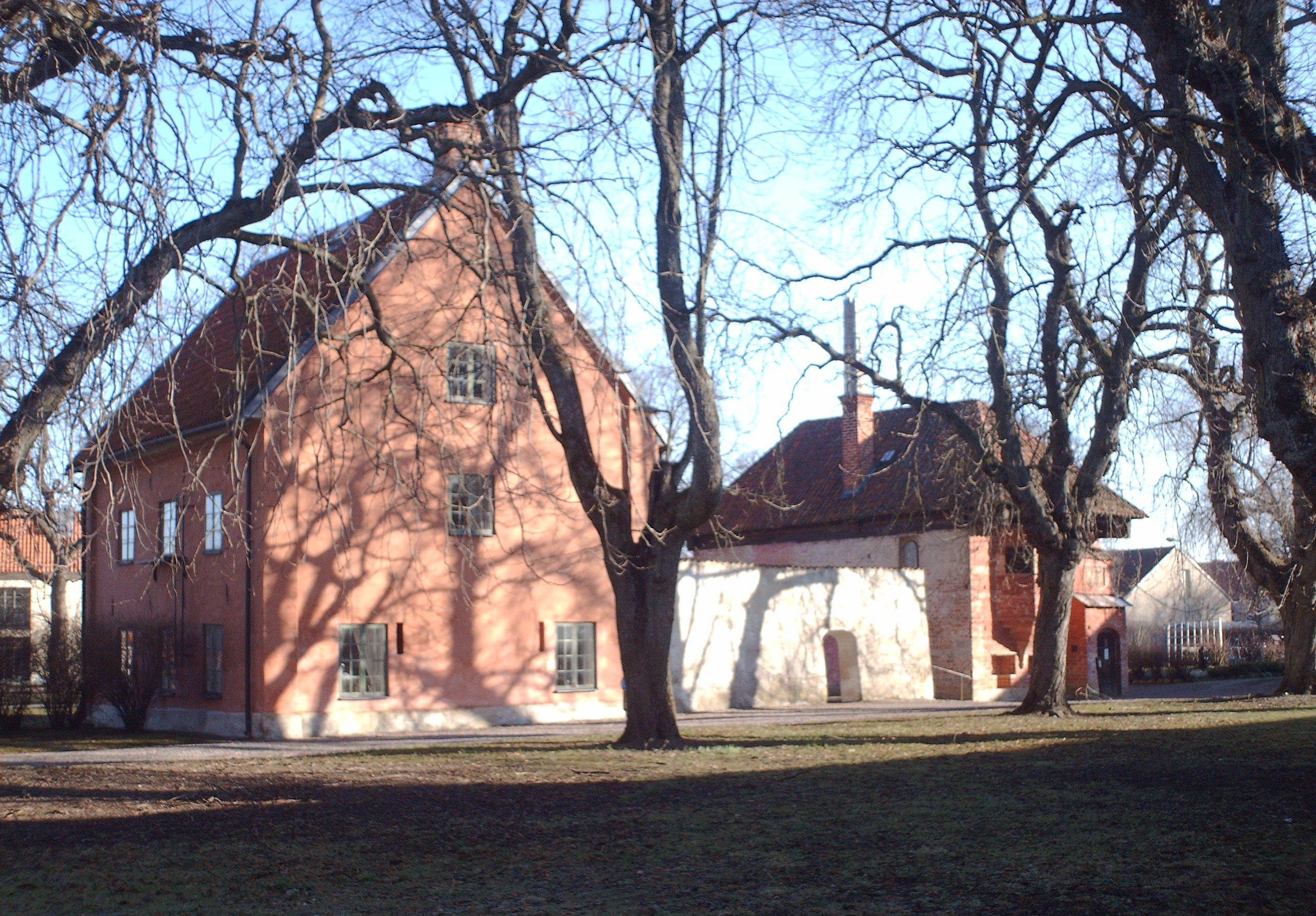
Vadstena Hospital Museum
