= Fågelsta =

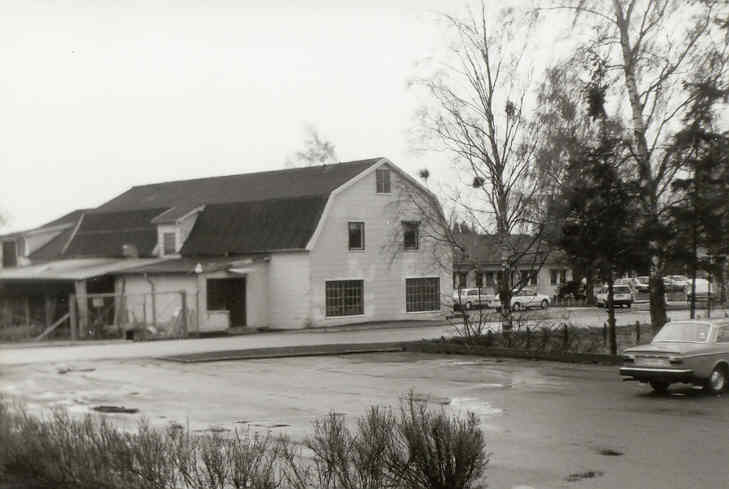
- Fågelsta in 1992

- Location within Östergötland Location within Sweden
- Coordinates: 58°27′N 15°03′E
- Country: Sweden
- Province: Östergötland
- County: Östergötland County
- Municipality: Motala Municipality

Area
  - Total: 0.55 km^{2} (0.21 sq mi)

Population (31 December 2017)
  - Total: 297
  - Density: 557/km^{2} (1,440/sq mi)
- Time zone: UTC+1 (CET)
  - Summer (DST): UTC+2 (CEST)

Fågelsta is a locality situated in Motala Municipality, Östergötland County, Sweden with 297 inhabitants in 2017. It is located 9 km south of Motala.

== History ==
Fågelsta grew around a railway line between Hallsberg and Mjölby, which began operations in 1873. One terminus of the narrow-gauge heritage railway Wadstena Fogelsta Järnväg is in Fågelsta, the other being in Vadstena. This railway was once part of Mellersta Östergötlands Järnväg. The station building was demolished in 1981.

There used to be two grocery stores in town. Both were equipped with gasoline pumps. There was also a hotel with a dining room and café. These businesses were all tied to the railway. The buildings have mostly been demolished over time, the last in conjunction with the expansion of the railway between Mjölby and Hallsberg. The building which formerly housed a Konsum, now closed, is still standing.

In the middle of the 20th century the town had a tailor, cobbler, and a small bank office which was open a few evenings each week. There was also a taxi, a local representative of the government (vaguely equivalent to a sheriff), and a fire station with two engines staffed by volunteers.

== Businesses ==
Bröderna Fransson started manufacturing wheel barrows and carts in 1934. In the 1960s they also started producing trailers. The trailers are still being made, although elsewhere, under the name Fogelstasläpet. There was also a bicycle workshop which sold bicycles, radios, and later also TV-sets. The interior of the bicycle workshop is now displayed at the Motoring Museum in Motala.

In 1925 a small freight forwarding company with two cars was started in town. It has since grown to about 60 vehicles, but moved to Mjölby in 2012.
