= Boren (Sweden) =

Lake in Östergötland, Sweden

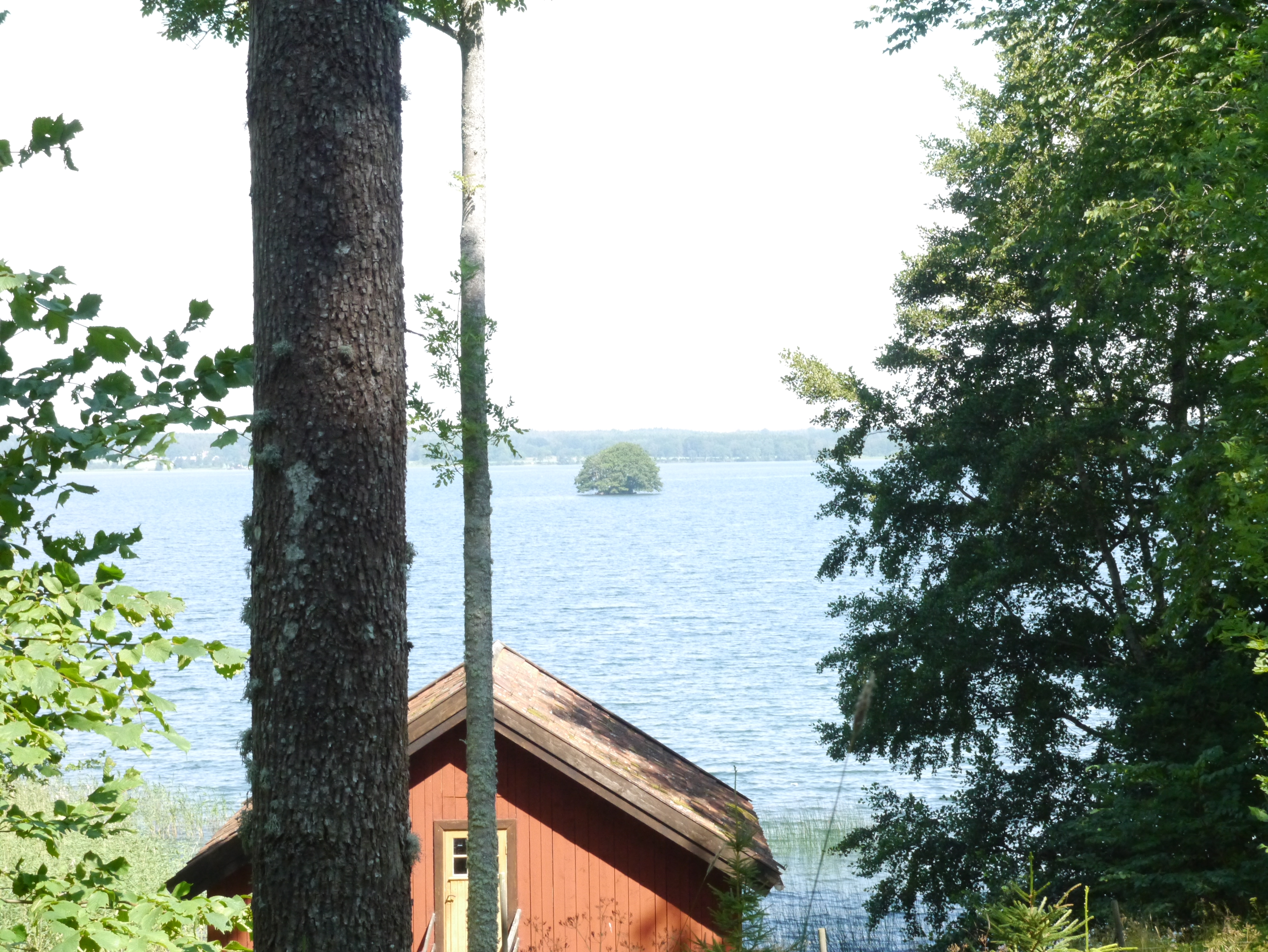

- Location within Östergötland Location within Sweden

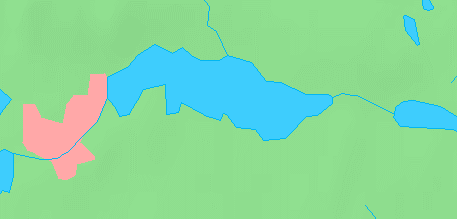
- Location: Östergötland
- Coordinates: 58°34′N 15°10′E
- Basin countries: Sweden
- Surface area: 28 km^{2} (11 sq mi)
- Max. depth: 14 m (46 ft)
- Surface elevation: 73 m (240 ft)

Boren (Swedish pronunciation: [ˈbûːrɛn]) is a lake in Östergötland, east of Motala, 73 m above sea level. It covers an area of 28 km² and is at most 14 meters deep. It forms a part of the Göta Canal and has given its name to Borensberg.
