= Borensberg =

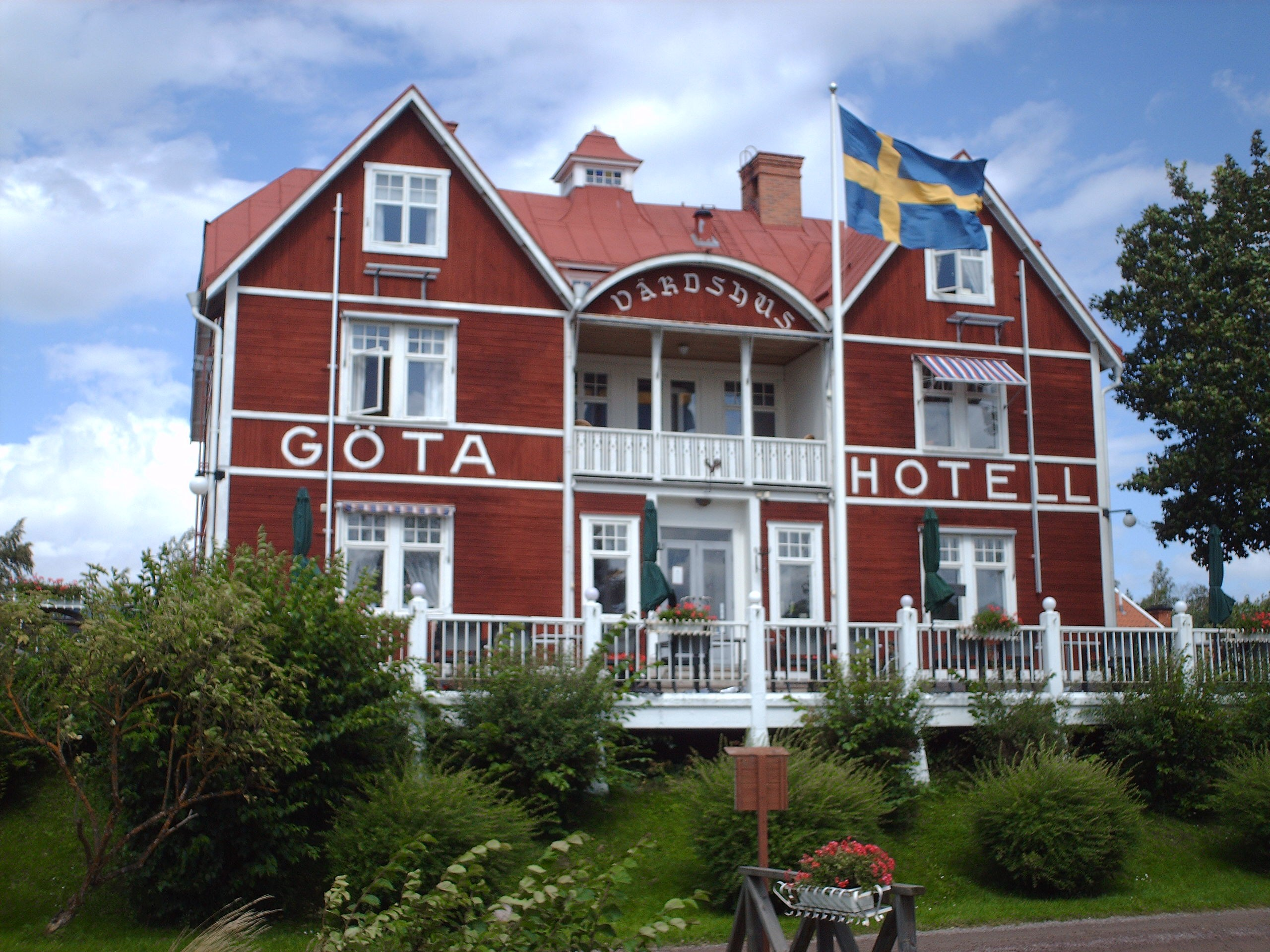
- Göta hotell

- Location within Östergötland Location within Sweden
- Coordinates: 58°34′N 15°17′E
- Country: Sweden
- Province: Östergötland
- County: Östergötland County
- Municipality: Motala Municipality

Area
  - Total: 2.40 km^{2} (0.93 sq mi)

Population (31 December 2010)
  - Total: 2,886
  - Density: 1,201/km^{2} (3,110/sq mi)
- Time zone: UTC+1 (CET)
  - Summer (DST): UTC+2 (CEST)

Borensberg (Swedish pronunciation: [bʊrɛnsˈbærj]) is a locality situated in Motala Municipality, Östergötland County, Sweden with 2,886 inhabitants in 2010. It is located 15 km east of Motala next to the Göta kanal and lake Boren, and has some factories including the plastic sheet manufacturer Arla Plast.

== History ==
The original name of the town was Husbyfjöl, as which it was first mentioned 17 April 1307. It is known to have been the place of a bridge on the Skänninge-Örebro road since former times. It is known to have hosted a pub during the reign of queen Christina of Sweden.

The building of Göta Canal had a major impact on the town.

Borensberg municipality was formed in 1952 through a merger of Brunneby, Klockrike och Kristberg municipalities. This area has been part of Motala municipality since 1971.

== Events ==
Husbyfjöl market is held annually, on the first Saturday of September.

== Transportation ==
Busses to and from Borensberg include Östgötatrafiken's line 520, 52, 53 (Linköping - Motala) and 51 (Linköping - Borensberg). Linköping/Saab Airport is the closest commercial airport, roughly 35 minutes away.

== Sports ==
The following sports clubs are located in Borensberg:

- Kristbergs IF
- Borensbergs IF
- Tjällmo-Godegårds OK
- Borensbergs IBC
