= Göta Canal =

Waterway in southern Sweden

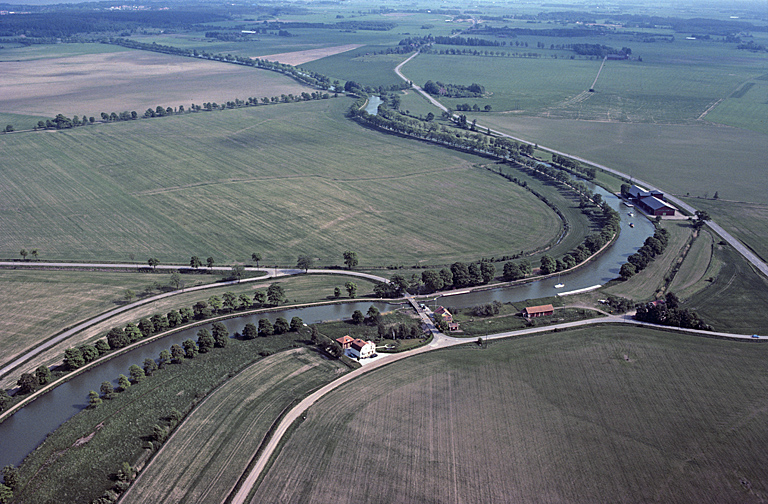
- Interactive map of Göta Canal
- Location: Götaland
- Country: Sweden

Specifications
- Maximum boat length: 30 m (98 ft)
- Maximum boat beam: 7 m (23 ft)
- Maximum boat draft: 2.82 m (9.3 ft)
- Maximum boat air draft: 22 m (72 ft)
- Locks: 58
- Maximum height AMSL: 91.8 m

History
- Date of first use: 26 September 1832

Geography
- Beginning coordinates: 58.837423°N 13.973451°E
- Ending coordinates: 58.479130°N 16.419368°E

The Göta Canal (Swedish: Göta kanal) is a Swedish canal constructed in the early 19th century. The canal is 190 km (120 mi) long, of which 87 km (54 mi) were dug or blasted, with a width varying between 7–14 m (23–46 ft) and a maximum depth of about 3 m (9.8 ft). Traffic is limited to 5 knots in the canal.

The Göta Canal is a part of a waterway 390 km (240 mi) long, linking a number of lakes and rivers to provide a route from Gothenburg (Göteborg) on the west coast to Söderköping on the Baltic Sea via the Trollhätte kanal and Göta älv river, through the large lakes Vänern and Vättern. This waterway was dubbed as Sweden's Blue Ribbon (Swedish: Sveriges blå band). Contrary to the popular belief it is not correct to consider this waterway as a sort of greater Göta Canal: the Trollhätte Canal and the Göta Canal are completely separate entities.

== History ==
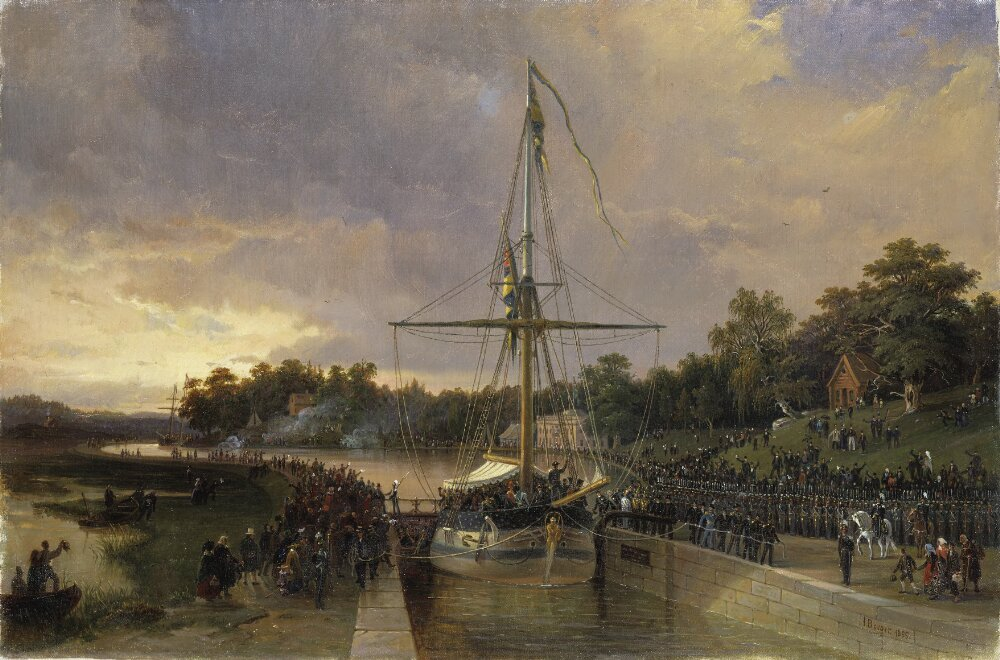
The opening of the Göta Canal at Mem in 1832, Johan Christian Berger, 1855

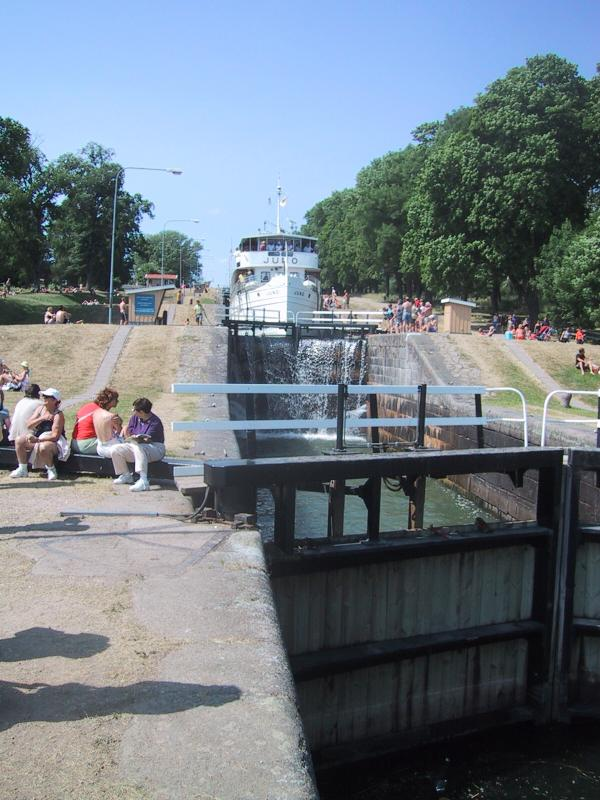
Locks at Berg, near Linköping, canal cruise ship M/S Juno descending to Lake Roxen

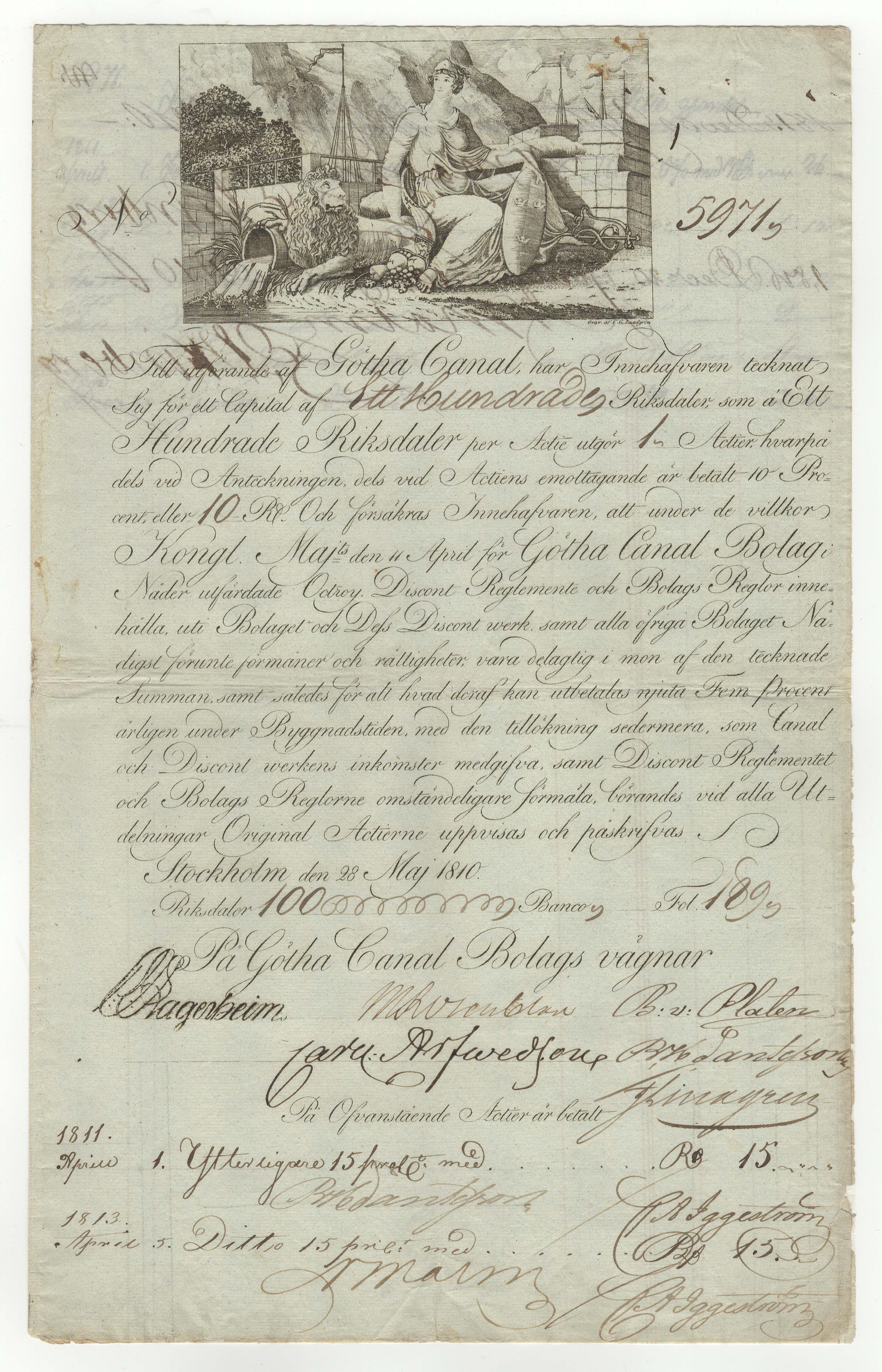
Share of the Göta Canal, issued 28 May 1810

The idea of a canal across southern Sweden was first put forward as early as 1516, by Hans Brask, the bishop of Linköping. However, it was not until the start of the 19th century that Brask's proposals were put into action by Baltzar von Platen, a German-born former officer in the Swedish Navy. He organised the project and obtained the necessary financial and political backing. His plans attracted the enthusiastic backing of the government and the new king, Charles XIII, who saw the canal as a way of kick-starting the modernisation of Sweden. Von Platen himself extolled the modernising virtues of the canal in 1806, claiming that mining, agriculture and other industries would benefit from "a navigation way through the country."

The project was inaugurated on 11 April 1810 with a budget of 24 million Swedish riksdalers. It was by far the greatest civil engineering project ever undertaken in Sweden up to that time, taking 22 years of effort by more than 58,000 workers. Much of the expertise and equipment had to be acquired from abroad, notably from Britain, whose canal system was the most advanced in the world at that time. The Scottish civil engineer Thomas Telford, renowned for his design of the Caledonian Canal in Scotland, developed the initial plans for the canal and travelled to Sweden in 1810 to oversee some of the early work on the route. Many other British engineers and craftsmen were imported to assist with the project, along with significant quantities of equipment - even apparently mundane items such as pickaxes, spades and wheelbarrows.

The Göta Canal was officially opened on 26 September 1832. Von Platen himself did not live to see the completion of the canal, having died shortly before its opening. However, the return on investment for the canal didn't live up to the hopes of the government. Bishop Hans Brask's original justifications for the canal's construction were the onerous Sound Dues imposed by Denmark–Norway on all vessels passing through the narrow Øresund channel between Sweden and Denmark and the trouble with the Hanseatic League. The canal enabled vessels travelling to or from the Baltic Sea to bypass the Øresund and so evade the Danish toll. In 1851, the tycoon André Oscar Wallenberg founded the Company for Swedish Canal Steamboat Transit Traffic to carry goods from England to Russia via the canal. However, it only ran two trips between St Petersburg and Hull via Motala before the Crimean War halted Anglo-Russian trade. After the war ended, the great powers pressured Denmark into ending the four-hundred-year-old tradition of the Sound Dues, thus eliminating at a stroke the canal's usefulness as an alternative to the Øresund.

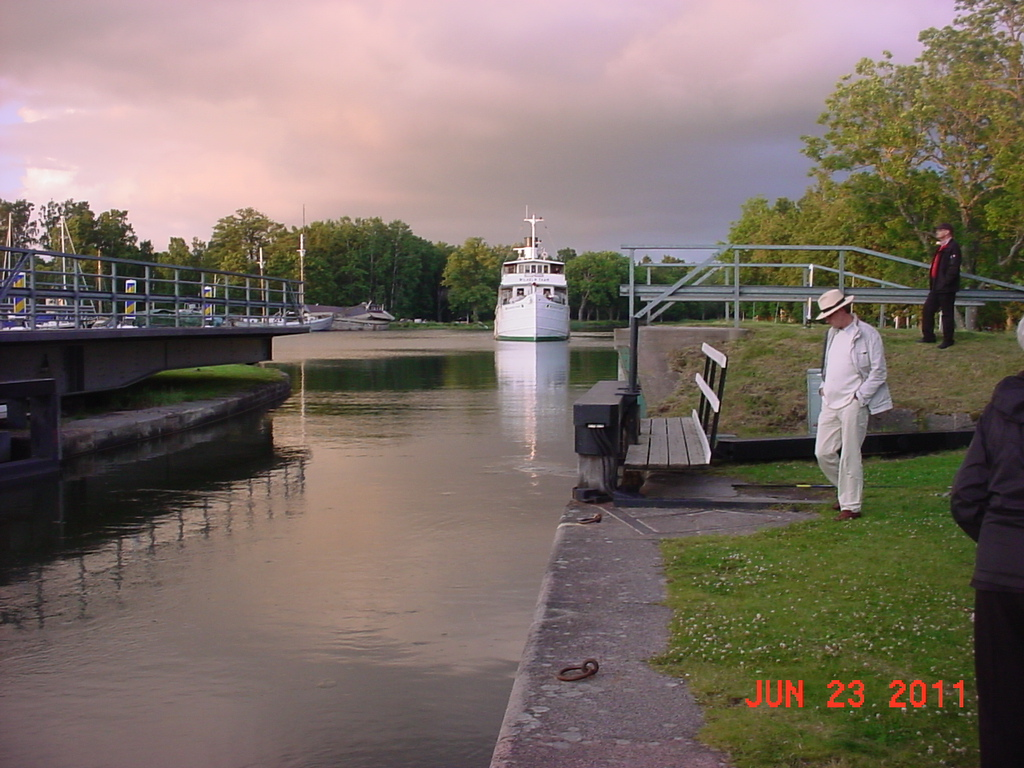
Lock at Lilla Edet, built in 1916, and the last lock on a westward journey. The original lock was opened in 1607 and was the first lock in Sweden.

The arrival of the railways in 1855 quickly made the canal redundant, as trains could carry passengers and goods far more rapidly and did not have to shut down with the arrival of winter, which made the canal impassable for five months of the year. By the 1870s, the canal's goods traffic had dwindled to just three major types of bulk goods - forest products, coal and ore, none of which required rapid transportation. Traffic volumes stagnated after that and never recovered.

The canal had one major industrial legacy in the shape of Motala Verkstad - a factory established in Motala to produce the machines such as cranes and steam dredgers that were needed to build the canal. This facility has sometimes been referred to as the "cradle of the Swedish engineering industry". After the canal was opened, Motala Verkstad focused on producing equipment, locomotives and rolling stock for the newly constructed railways, beginning a tradition of railway engineering that continues to this day in the form of AB Svenska Järnvägsverkstädernas Aeroplanavdelning (ASJA) that was bought by the aeroplane manufacturer SAAB in Linköping.

== Description ==
These days the canal is primarily used as a tourist and recreational attraction. Around two million people visit the canal each year on pleasure cruises - either on their own boats or on one of the many cruise ships - and related activities. The canal sometimes is ironically called the "divorce ditch" (Swedish: skilsmässodiket) because of the troubles that inexperienced couples have to endure while trying to navigate the narrow canal and the many locks by themselves.

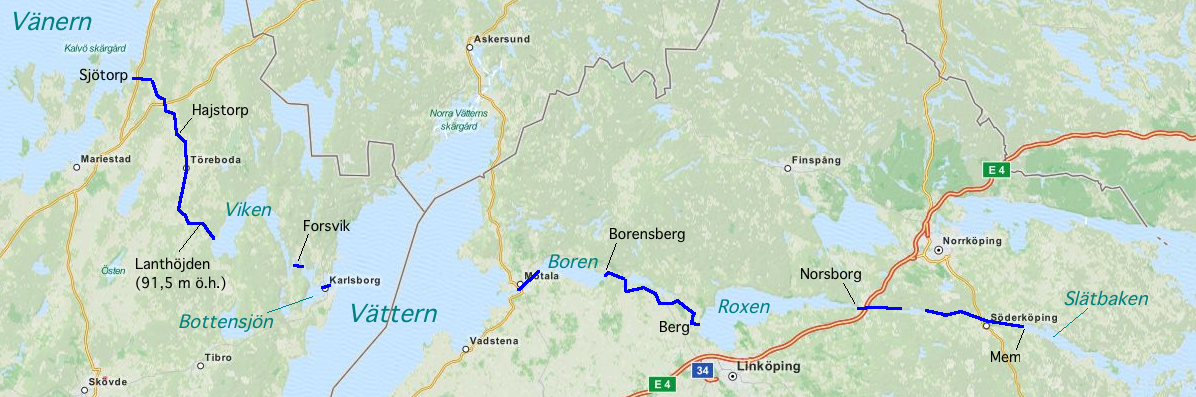
The route of the Göta Canal (in blue)

=== Locks ===
The canal has 58 locks and can accommodate vessels up to 30 m (98 ft) long, 7 m (23 ft) wide and 2.8 m (9.2 ft) in draft.

From the east-coast of Sweden to Lake Vänern the locks are as follows (with meters of height difference per lock):

- Mem, 3
- Tegelbruket, 2.3
- Söderköping, 2.4
- Duvkullen nedre, 2.3
- Duvkullen övre, 2.4
- Mariehov nedre, 2.1
- Mariehov övre, 2.6
- Carlsborg nedre, 5.1
- Carlsborg övre, 4.7
- Klämman, open
- Hulta, 3.2
- Bråttom, 2.3
- Norsholm, 0.8
- Carl Johans slussar (seven locks), 18.8
- Oskars slussar, 4.8
- Karl Ludvig Eugéns slussar, 5.5
- Brunnby, 5.3
- Heda, 5.2
- Borensberg, 0.2
- Borenshult, 15.3
- Motala, 0.1

Lake Vättern (88 m above sea level)

- Forsvik, 3.5

Lake Viken (92 m above sea level – canal's highest point)

- Tåtorp, 0.2
- Hajstorp övre, 5.0
- Hajstorp nedre, 5.1
- Riksberg, 7.5
- Godhögen, 5.1
- Norrkvarn övre, 2.9
- Norrkvarn nedre, 2.9
- Sjötorp 7-8, 4.6
- Sjötorp 6, 2.4
- Sjötorp 4-5, 4.8
- Sjötorp 2-3, 4.8
- Sjötorp 1, 2.9

After Lake Vänern (44 m above sea level) Trollhätte kanal to Gothenburg and the west-coast of Sweden.

== See also ==
- Caledonian Canal - Sister canal in Scotland
- Kiel Canal
- Øresund
- List of government enterprises of Sweden

== Bibliography and references ==
- Eric de Maré, Swedish Cross Cut, Sweden, 1965. (In English)
- Åkesson, Gert; Brusewitz, Gunnar; Linders, Anders; Skeat, Anthony (1987). Sweden's wonderful waterway: Gothenburg-Stockholm by canal steamer. Malmö: Stenvall. SELIBR 7630199.
