= List of museums in Sweden =

This is a list of museums in Sweden.

== By county ==
=== Blekinge ===
- Marinmuseum
- Ropewalk (Karlskrona)

=== Dalarna ===
- Great Copper Mountain
- Zorn Collections

=== Gävleborg ===
- Prison Museum of Sweden
- Swedish Railway Museum

=== Gotland ===
- Gotland Museum

=== Halland ===
- Bexell Cottage
- Ekomuseum nedre Ätradalen
- Göran Karlsson's Motor Museum
- Halland Museum of Cultural History
- HSwMS Najaden (1897)
- Mjellby Art Museum
- Tjolöholm Castle

=== Jämtland ===
- Jamtli
- Optand Teknikland

=== Jönköping ===
- Match Museum
- Gladiators – Heroes of the Colosseum
- Jönköpings läns museum
- Husqvarna Factory Museum

=== Kalmar ===
- Borgholm Castle
- Döderhultarn Museum
- Eketorp
- Kalmar Castle
- Kingdom of Crystal

=== Kronoberg ===
- IKEA Museum
- Kingdom of Crystal
- Swedish Emigrant Institute

=== Norrbotten ===
- Gammelstad Church Town
- Norrbottens Museum
- Piteå Wall of Fame
- Teknikens Hus

=== Skåne ===
- Galerie St. Petri
- Glimmingehus
- Kulturen
- Landskrona Citadel
- Malmö Konsthall
- Malmö Castle
- Museum of Failure
- Museum of Sketches for Public Art
- Rooseum
- Sofiero Castle
- Sövdeborg Castle
- Svaneholm Castle
- Teknik på farfars tid
- Wanås Castle

=== Södermanland ===
- Femöre battery
- Gripsholm Castle
- Östra Södermanlands Järnväg
- Sörmland Museum
- Tullgarn Palace

=== Uppsala ===
- Bror Hjorths Hus
- Geijersgården
- Gustavianum
- Museum of Evolution of Uppsala University (formerly the Paleontological Museum of Uppsala University)
- Upplandsmuseet
- Uppsala Castle
- Uppsala University Coin Cabinet
- Upsala-Lenna Jernväg

=== Värmland ===
- Mårbacka
- Ransäters bruksherrgård

=== Västerbotten ===
- Bildmuseet

=== Västernorrland ===
- Gene fornby

=== Västmanland ===
- Engelsberg
- Engelsberg-Norberg Railway
- Strömsholm Palace
- Tidö Castle

=== Västra Götaland ===
- Gothenburg Museum of Art
- Bohus Fortress
- City Museum of Gothenburg
- Ekomuseum nedre Ätradalen
- Fladen
- Göteborgs Konsthall
- Gunnebo House
- Karlsborg Fortress
- Läckö Castle
- Nordic Watercolour Museum
- Röhsska Museum
- Skansen Kronan
- HSwMS Småland (J19)
- HSwMS Sölve
- Textile Museum of Borås
- Torpa stenhus
- Universeum
- Viking (barque)
- Volvo Museum
- Museum of World Culture

=== Örebro ===
- Cookbook museum

=== Östergötland ===
- Charlottenborg Castle
- Ekenäs Castle
- Löfstad Castle
- Motala longwave transmitter
- Motala Motor Museum
- Övralid
- Swedish Air Force Museum
- Vadstena Castle
- Museum of Work

== Other ==
- Internetmuseum, an online museum

== See also ==
- List of museums
- Tourism in Sweden
- Culture of Sweden
