= Ropewalk =

Long narrow lane or building for making rope

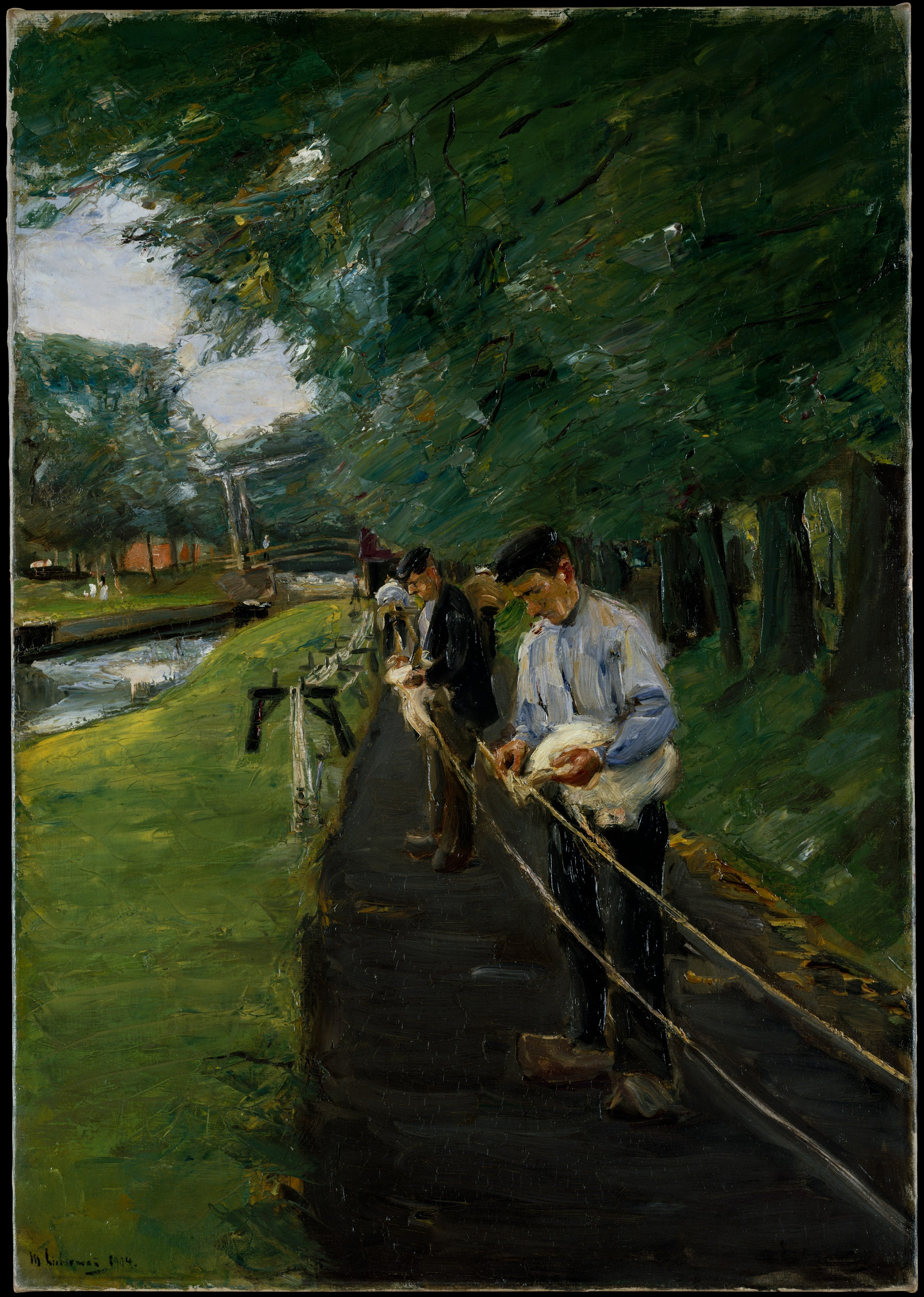
"The Ropewalk in Edam" by Max Liebermann

A ropewalk is a long straight narrow lane, or a covered pathway, where long strands of material are laid before being twisted into rope. Due to the length of some ropewalks, workers may use bicycles to get from one end to the other.

Many ropewalks were in the open air, while others were covered only by roofs. Ropewalks historically frequently caught fire, as hemp dust ignites easily and burns fiercely. Rope was essential in sailing ships and the standard length for a British Naval Rope was 1,000 feet (300 m). A sailing ship such as HMS Victory required 31 miles (50 km) of rope.

== Rope-making technology ==
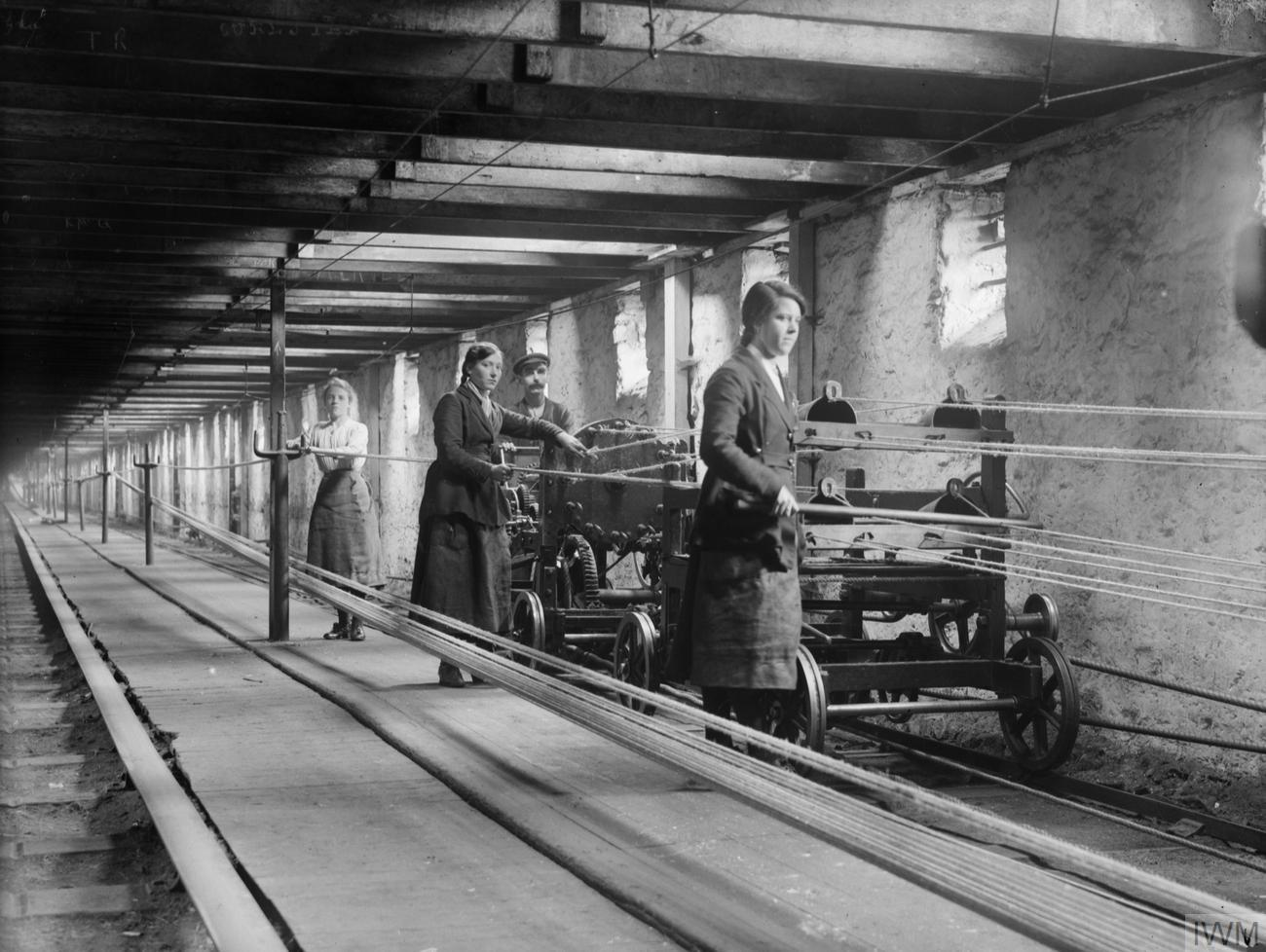
Workers operating machines in a rope walk, 170 fathoms (1,020 ft; 310 m) long, in a Scottish rope factory, November 1918

Natural fibres are short in length, and so have to be twisted together into different fibres, starting at different points along the construction, to hold each other together. From a single strand, much like wool, which can easily be torn apart, putting several together forms a line, which is far stronger. That can similarly be repeated time and again, producing a very strong rope, at the cost of weight and size. More modern fibres are likewise spun together for the same reasons, but because they are inherently stronger, similar strength is often achieved at much lower weight and size.

The essence of a ropewalk, where this spinning is achieved, is a drive mechanism at one end of the walk, a "donkey" guide or "runner" in the middle, which helps the ropemaker bring the strands together, and a fixing point at the far end. One end or the other is mobile, because the twisting shortens the constituent parts of the rope, and the runner in the middle is always mobile, because the rope, when sufficiently twisted, starts to form at one end and the guide then has to run back towards the drive end, guiding the twist into place: this can be a very fast action, once sufficient twist is in place.

The runner is in general somewhat melon-shaped, with grooves in it designed to guide the strands of the rope into place as they form, and sometimes a hollow centre to allow the feed of a central core into the rope: the central core is not normally twisted. When a twisted rope or cord is used as a strand, it is spun in the opposite direction to the "handedness" of the strand (i.e. a strand which has been spun together anti-clockwise is twisted in a clockwise direction when it is spun into a larger rope, and vice versa).

Because of the very great weight of such lengths of natural fibre, other support trestles are also sometimes used to keep the weight off the ground, where the friction might overcome the strength of the equipment. Other lubrication has sometimes been used to assist the process.

Very long cables, such as those used for long-distance undersea communications, have more complex structures, but nonetheless start with similar elements. Because the distances involved are far greater, a more continuous flow process replaces the standard ropewalk, shortening the length of the walk as the runner becomes static, and the feed end becomes far more complex as it has to spin in one direction whilst laying the rope in the other. Although further waterproofing and armoured coatings are normal, the core of the rope is similar to the description.

== Examples ==
Downtown Liverpool's bohemian Ropewalks district takes its name from this practice and consists of the lanes where this work once took place.

Cable Street in London started as a straight path along which hemp ropes were twisted into ships' cables (i.e. ropes).

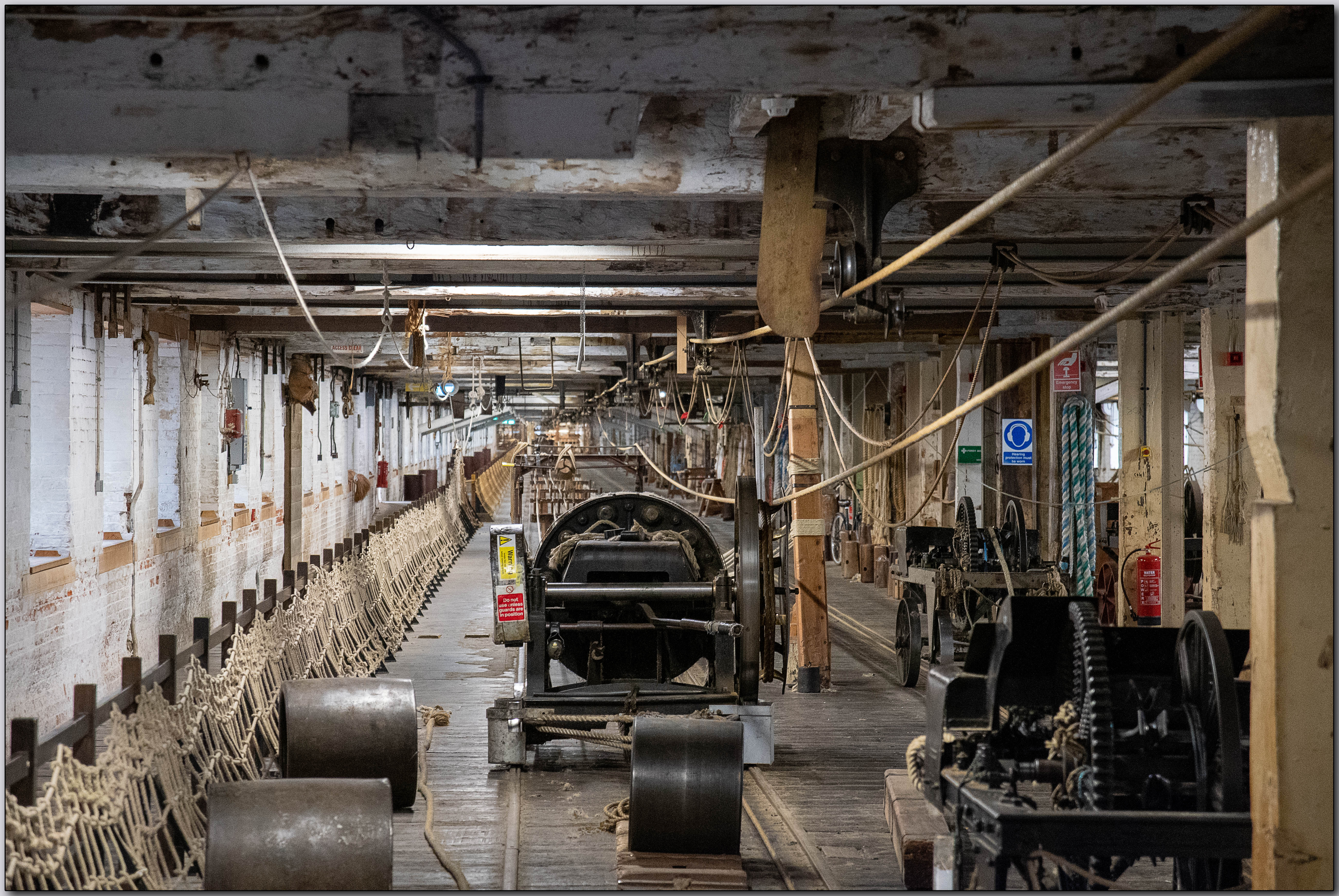
The ropewalk at Chatham Dockyard

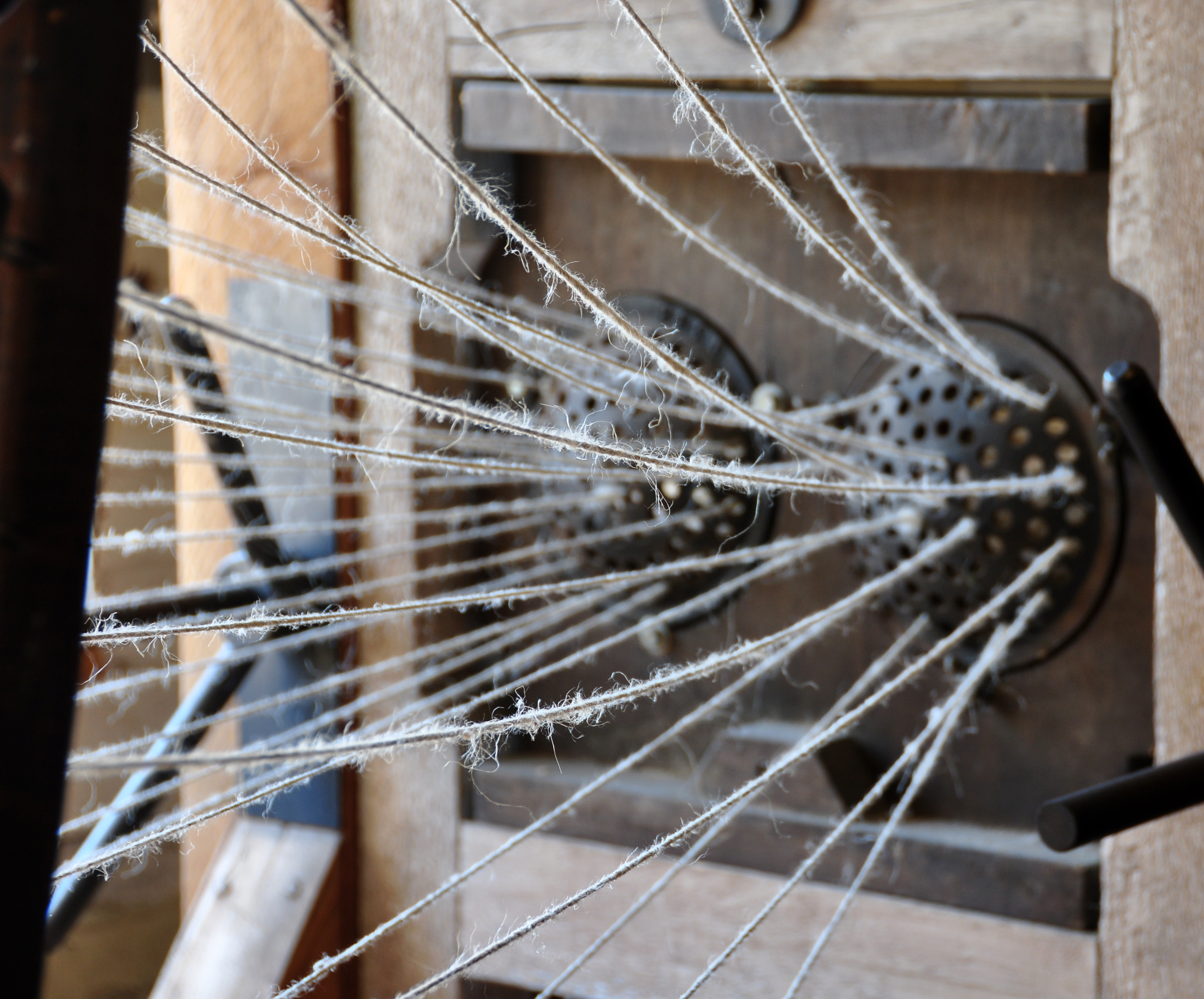
Rope being made by machinery at the Chatham Dockyard

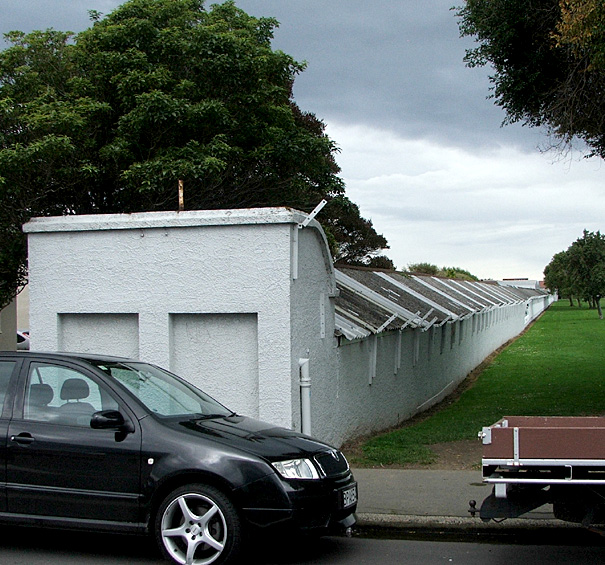
Donaghy's ropewalk in Caversham, New Zealand is less than 4 metres (13 ft) wide yet some 380 metres (1,250 ft) in length.

The ropewalk at Chatham Dockyard (as part of the Ropery or Ropehouse) is still producing rope commercially and has an internal length of 1,135 feet (346 m). When it was constructed in 1790, it was the longest brick building in Europe. Before steam power was introduced in 1836, it took over 200 men to form and close a cable laid rope of 20 inches (51 cm) circumference. The rope walk is used to form and close the rope, these being the final stages in rope making. Before this the raw hemp, manila hemp or sisal has to be hatchelled, spun into yarn, and tarred.

In the early 17th century, Peter Appleby constructed a 980-foot-long (300 m) ropewalk (for the dockyard) in the Christianshavn neighbourhood of Copenhagen, Denmark.

From the late 17th century, the ropewalk on the Swedish island of Lindholmen was a key component of the Karlskrona Naval Base producing rope up to 300 metres in length for the cordage of warships. Although production ceased in 1960, the elaborately designed facility is now open to the public with exhibitions and demonstrations of ropemaking. A similarly scaled facility in Rochefort, Charente-Maritime, France, called the Corderie Royale, is also maintained as a museum within the Centre International de la Mer.

In the 18th century, Malta and Mahón, on the island of Menorca, both had open-air ropewalks.

In Boston in the Massachusetts Colony, some early rope making businesses were called 'ropewalks'. An important industry in an active port city, documentation of many of their locations can be found on maps of the period. A granite structure formerly used for US Navy lines remains in the Charlestown Navy Yard, but has been converted to housing. The Charlestown Ropewalk is claimed to be the only standing ropewalk in the United States. A relocated partial ropewalk originally from Plymouth is on display at the Mystic Seaport Museum.

Jalan Pintal Tali, which is in one of the older, central parts of George Town, Penang, Malaysia, literally means "rope-twisting street".

In Toronto, a ropewalk appears on municipal maps from as early as the 1860s and operated for at least 40 years. The ropewalk ran to the east of Lansdowne Avenue (formerly Jameson Avenue, then North Lansdowne Avenue). An 1884 Insurance Plan shows the factory going from lot 42 at the south end to lot 35 at the north.

The Reeperbahn (English: "ropewalk") in Hamburg is now the center of the famous amusement and red-light district St. Pauli.

The Ropewalk in Nottingham passes over Park Tunnel.

== See also ==
- Reeperbahn
