= Polhem dry dock =

Dry dock in Sweden

Coordinates: 56.15314°N 15.58236°E

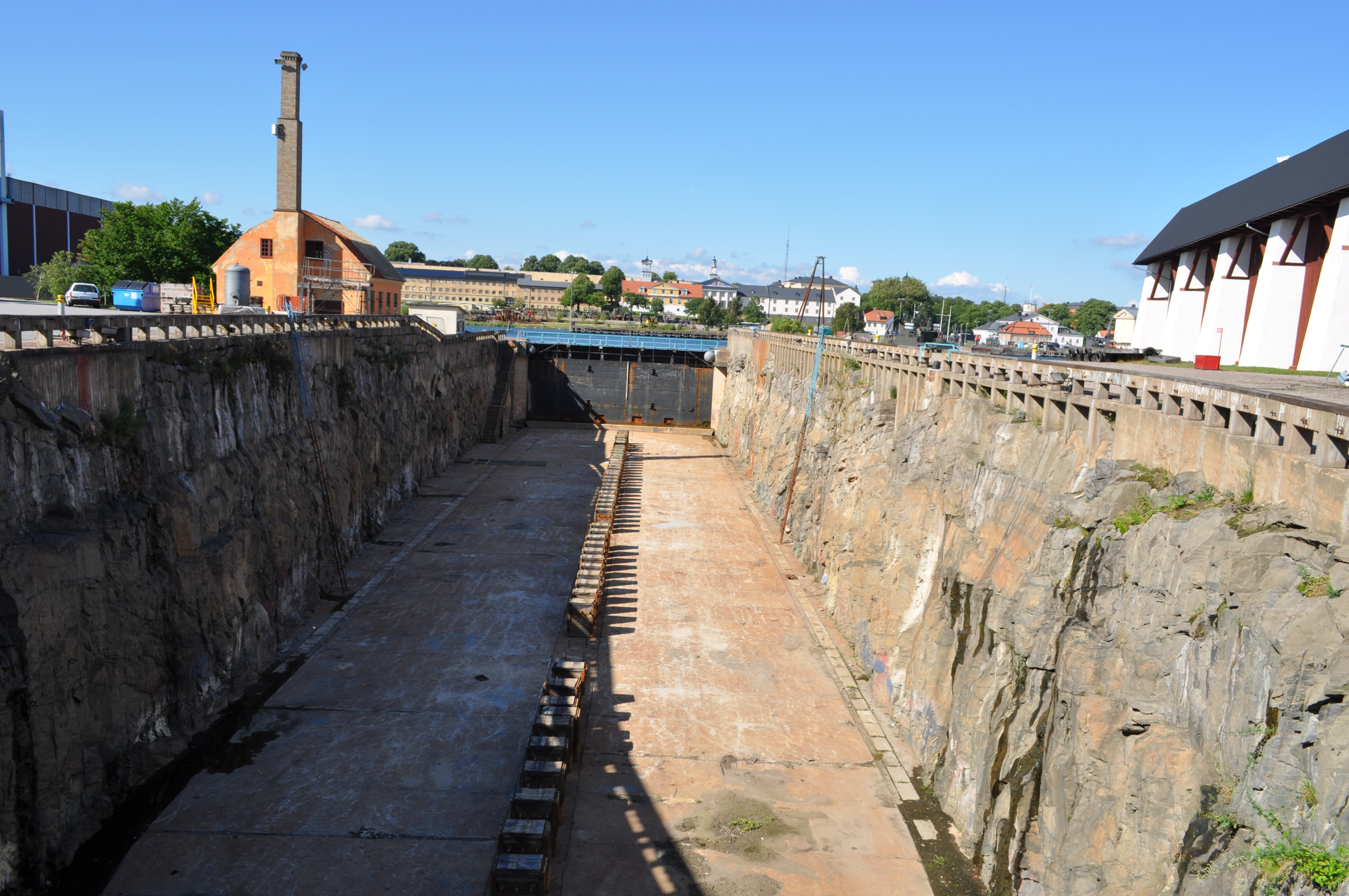
Polhemsdockan in 2010

Polhemsdockan, the Polhem dry dock, is situated in the World heritage Örlogsstaden Karlskrona, was built in 1717–1724 and was the first dry dock in Sweden. It is cut out in the cliff on Lindholmen island and catered for shipping including the largest warships of its day.

While dry docks in other countries were emptied by the tidal water going out, in this dock water pumps are used, as the Baltic Sea doesn't have any significant tide. The dry dock was built by 600 men and was an international sensation for its advanced design. The drydock has its name from Christopher Polhem, who constructed it. It is described as the Eighth Wonder of the World by the Karlskrona shipyard history association. The water pumps were created by the shipbuilding master Charles Sheldon, they were of a kind already used in Swedish mines. Before converting to steam power in the 19th century around 100 men were required to power the pumps.
