= Hagbard and Signy =

Pair of lovers in Scandinavian mythology

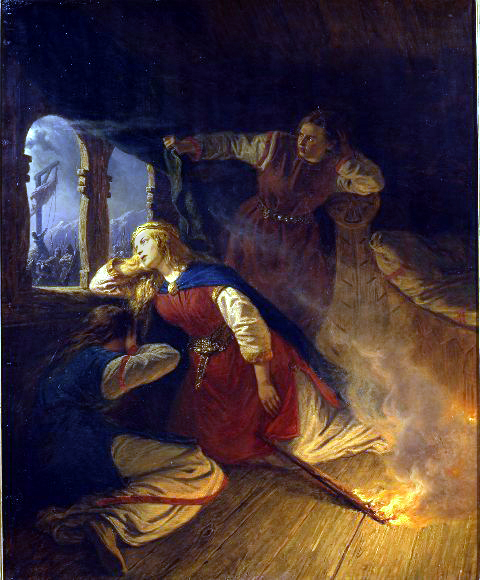
"Signhild" (1861) by Josef Wilhelm Wallander.

Hagbard and Signe (Signy) (the Viking Age) or Habor and Sign(h)ild (the Middle Ages and later) were a pair of lovers in Scandinavian mythology and folklore whose legend was widely popular. The heroes' connections with other legendary characters place the events in the 5th century AD. Hagbard and his brother Haki were famous sea-kings (see Haki for his battles over the throne of Sweden). Like the name Hagbard (Hagbarðr), the legend is believed to have continental Germanic origins.

== Storyline ==
During the centuries of popularity the story changed. This is the most comprehensive version from Gesta Danorum (book 7).

Hagbard was the son of Haamund while Signy was the daughter of Sigar. Once, when Hagbard and his brothers were pillaging, they started to fight with Signy's brothers. The battle was even and they finally decided to have peace. Hagbard followed Signy's brothers and managed to be alone with Signy in secret. She promised him her love, in spite of being more interested in Haki, the more famous brother.

When a German nobleman proposed to Signy, it became apparent that she was more interested in Hagbard. The German, then, started intriguing and created an animosity between the two groups of brothers. There was a battle and Hagbard's brothers were killed, after which honour obliged Hagbard to slay Signy's brothers and the German suitor.

In order to meet Signy, Hagbard dressed up as a woman and claimed to be his brother Haki's shieldmaiden. Haki had not been involved in the battles with Signy's brothers, and he was the one whom Signy really had wanted. Hagbard, however, trusted in Signy's promise to him.

Since he was dressed as a woman, Hagbard was offered to sleep among Signy's handmaidens. When the handmaidens washed his legs, they asked him why they were so furry and why his hands were so calloused. Because of this, he invented a clever verse to explain his strange appearance. Signy, however, understanding that it was Hagbard who had come to see her, explained to the maidens that his verse was truthful.

During the night, they exchanged promises of eternal love and faithfulness. These promises filled Hagbard with such pleasure that he did not fear meeting her father and brothers if he were discovered leaving her chamber.

Hagbard was deceived by the handmaidens and he was arrested by Sigar's men. He defended himself well and slew many of the men. He was, however, defeated and taken to the thing, where the people had different opinions. Some claimed that he should be killed, whereas others claimed that it would be a shame to lose such a brave warrior. It was decided that the king's honour had to be protected and Hagbard killed.

The gallows were constructed, while the queen gave him a drink to quench his thirst. She mocked him, but Hagbard answered, "I will drink a last toast, and I take the horn of death with the same hand as with the one I sent your two sons to the goddess Hel. I will not die without revenge". Then, he threw the horn onto her head so that the mead ran over her face.

During this time, Signy was amongst her crying maidens, asking them if they were willing to follow her wherever she would go. Crying, she told them that she would die with the only man she had embraced in life. Then she asked them to set her chamber on fire as soon as the watchman signalled the execution. They all vowed to die with her.

Hagbard was brought to a hill, which is named after him, to be hanged. In order to test his fiancée's fidelity, he asked the hangmen to first hang his coat. He explained that it would please him to get an impression of how he would look when dead.

His last wish was granted, and the watchman, who thought it was Hagbard who was hanging, signalled so to the maidens who were gathered around Signy in the hill fort. The maidens set the house on fire and hanged themselves in the flames.

When Hagbard saw that the king's hill fort was aflame, he felt more joy about his loved one's faithfulness than sorrow about his own impending death. He exclaimed poetically his happiness, whereupon he was immediately hanged.

== Folk songs ==
The song of Habor and Signhild (TSB D 430) was very popular and it was sung all over Scandinavia for centuries. It has also been subjected to scholarly analysis in many ways. It has been claimed that it was sung as early as the 13th century, and in Sweden it exists in many versions ranging from handwritten ditties from the early 17th century to eighteen chapbooks from the period 1638–1839. In the 17th century, it seems to have been Sweden's most popular folk song. There were also many versions in Denmark and Norway.

The folk song is still known among non-scholars.

== Locations ==
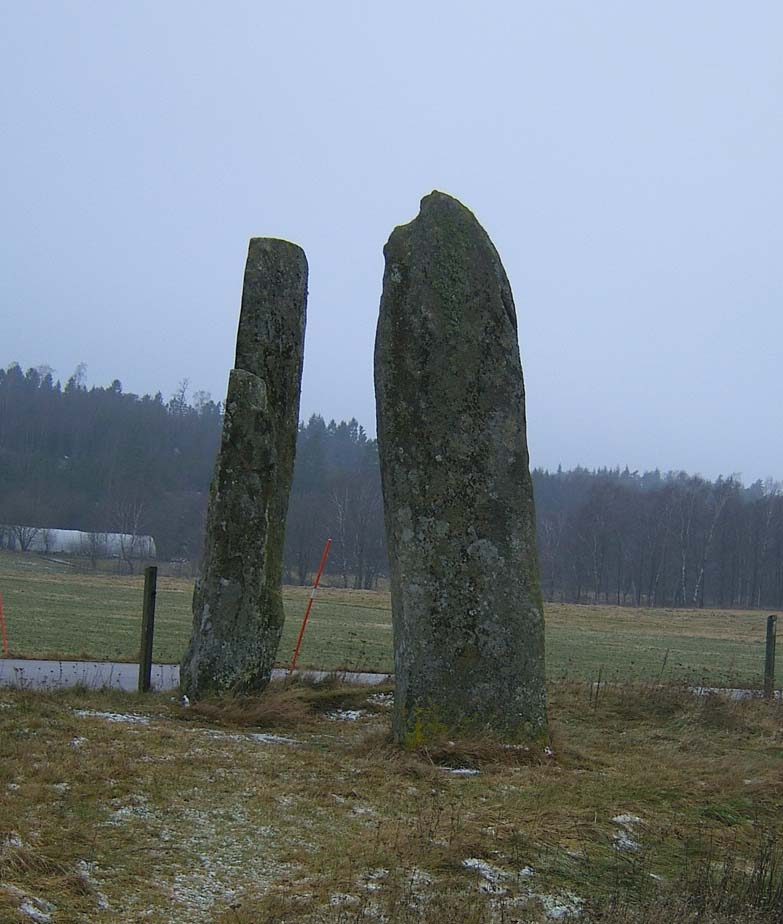
Hagbard's gallows, a megalithic monument in Halland, Sweden.

The Danes claimed very early that the name "Sigari oppidum" (Sigar's hill fort) referred to the Swedish Sigerstad in Halland between Halmstad and Falkenberg, where there are many monuments about the legend, such as Hagbard's gallows, Hagbard's stones, Siger's hill, Signy's chamber, Signy's well and Hagbard's mound. These monuments are all mentioned in Tuneld, Geografie Ofver Konungariket Swerige (1793).

A second Dane wrote in 1779 that the most likely location was in Blekinge, where there are a Hagbard's oak and a Signy's chamber. There is also a location in Närke named Segersjö (Sigar's lake) which has two cairns called Hagbard's cairn and Signy's cairn. There are also locations in Norway.

Laurentius Petri wrote in the Svenska Krönikan (Swedish chronicle) in 1559 that there were many traditions about Habardh and Signill. According to the songs, Hagbard was not Swedish, but the son of a Norwegian king, and Signy was a Swedish princess. The songs also related that Hagbard was hanged not far from Sigtuna in Uppland, where there was a plain called Hagbard's plain in Håtuna Parish.

This placed the events in Old Sigtuna, a version that Johannes Messenius wanted to confirm in Sveopentaprotopolis (1611). He argued that the names in the area of Old Sigtuna contradicted the Danish claims of a Danish location. Later in Scondia illustrata, he contradicted his claims and said that Signill was rather a Danish princess and Habor a Norwegian. However, in 1612, he reasserted that Signy was a Swedish princess, in Old Sigtuna.

In 1678, Old Sigtuna was renamed Sighildsberg in honour of Signy. The interest continued unabated for centuries.
