= Hendrik Mäkeler =

German numismatist

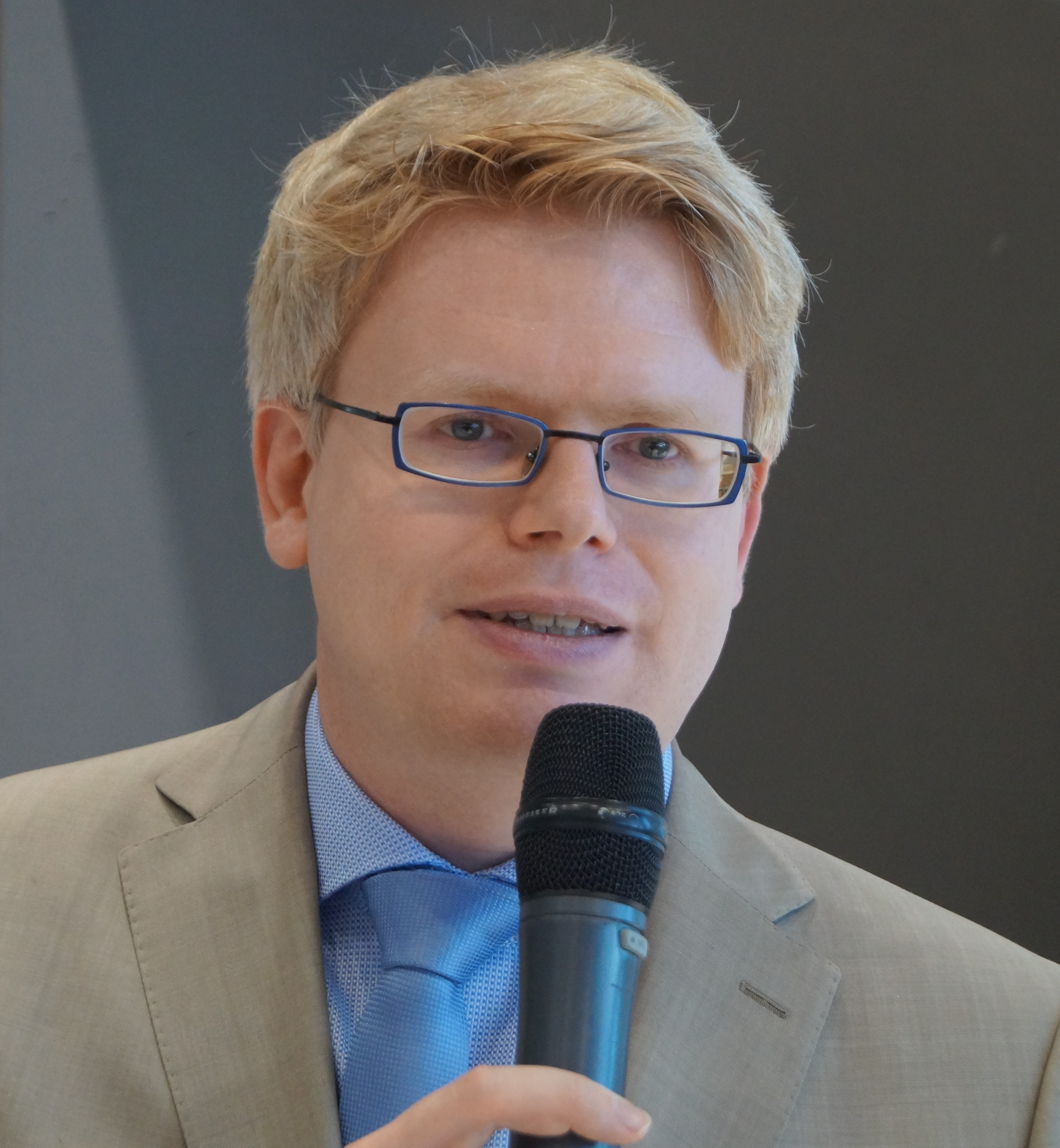
Hendrik Mäkeler, 2018

Hendrik Mäkeler (born 1979 in Rinteln) is a German numismatist.

== Life and work ==
Hendrik Mäkeler studied from 1999 to 2004 Pre- and Protohistory and Medieval and Modern History as well as Nordic Philology at the Christian Albrechts University in Kiel. From 2002 to 2004 he obtained a scholarship of the Studienstiftung des Deutschen Volkes.

He wrote his master's thesis in 2004 on the topic "The accounting book of the Speyer printer Peter Drach (around 1450-1504)" and obtained his doctorate in 2008 with his dissertation "Imperial coinage in the late middle ages".

From 2008 to 2017 he was director of the Uppsala University Coin Cabinet. Since November 2017, he is Head of Numismatics and Monetary History in the Deutsche Bundesbank. Furthermore, he was a guest lecturer at the Historical Institute of the University of Mannheim in November 2012.

Since 2007 he is a corresponding member of the Swedish Numismatic Society.

== Awards ==
- 1995: Eligius Youth Prize of the German Numismatic Society
- 2011: Honorary Award of the Society for International Monetary History
