= Hagbard's gallow =

Coordinates: 56°53′01″N 12°44′16″E

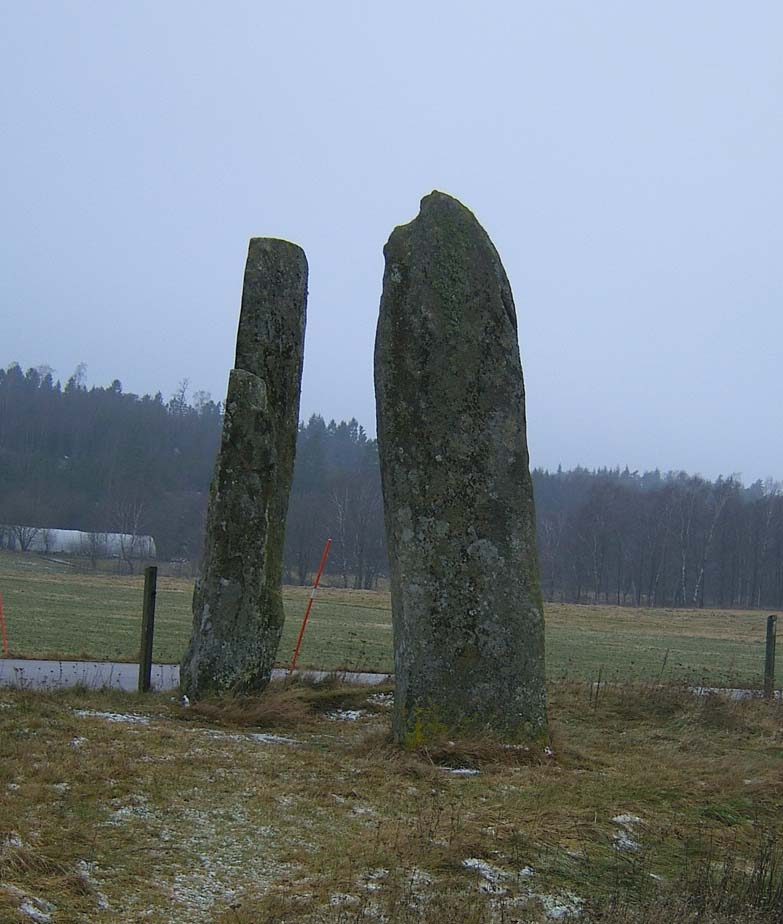
"Hagbard's gallows", a megalithic monument in Asige, Halland, Sweden.

Hagbard's Gallow consists of two pair of menhirs, located in Asige, Sweden. The monument was probably constructed during the Bronze Age. The stone has engravings, some discovered in the 18th century and some in modern times.

The name is related to the legend of Hagbard and Signy, with which several other nearby remains are related as well.

It is part of Ekomuseum nedre Ätradalen.
