= Teknik på farfars tid =

Museum in Helsingborg, Sweden

Coordinates: 56.0749°N 12.7194°E

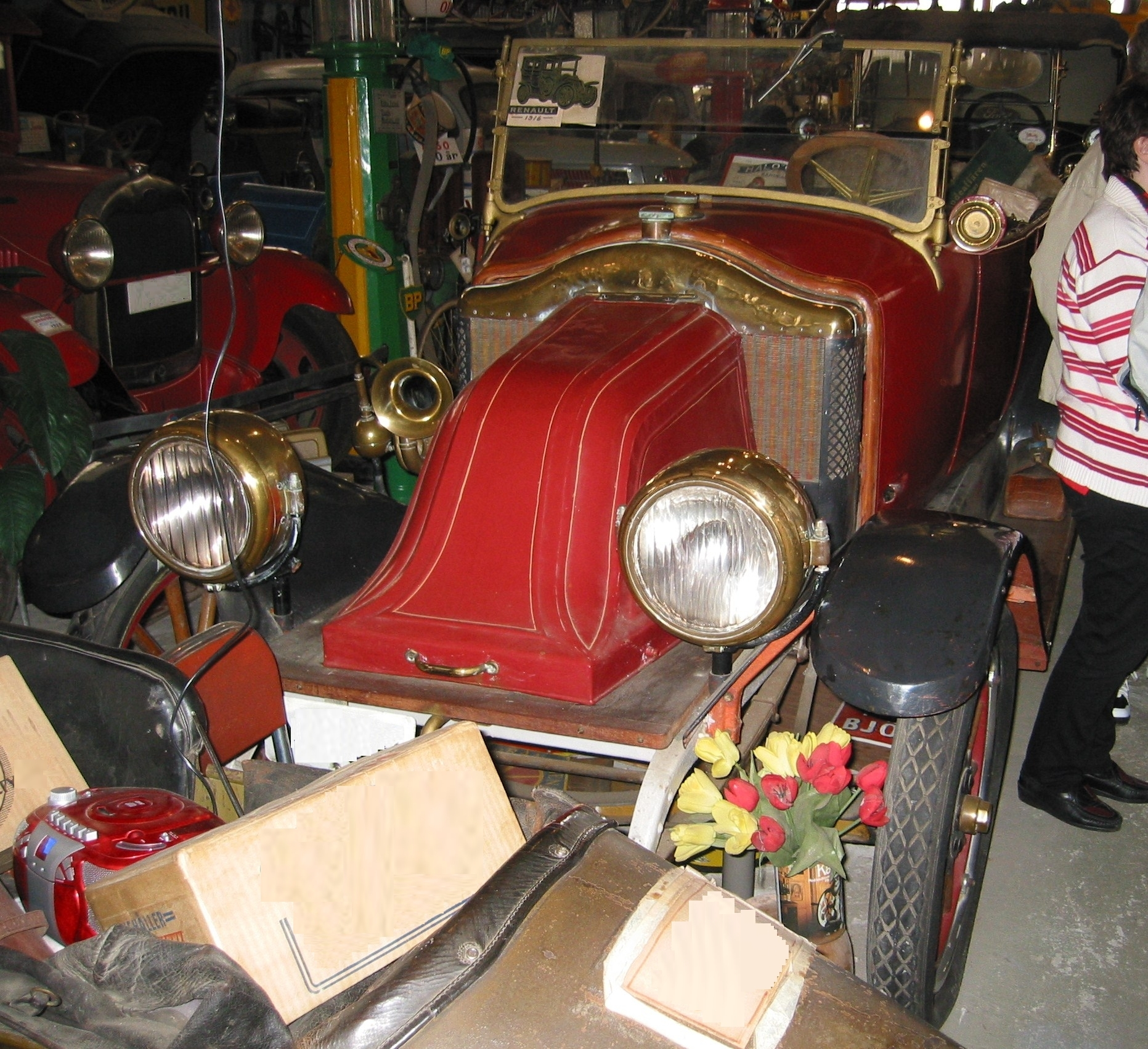
Renault Torpedo 1920, one of the items at the museum.

Teknik på farfars tid is a privately owned museum dedicated to technology of the early 20th century in Helsingborg, Sweden. The museum was founded by Bengt Strand in 1970, and contains thousands of items: from veteran cars and motorcycles, to radios and toys. Bengt Strand received the Cultural Award of Helsingborg in 1989.
