= Uppsala University Coin Cabinet =

Numismatic museum in Sweden

Coordinates: 59°51′27″N 17°37′46″E

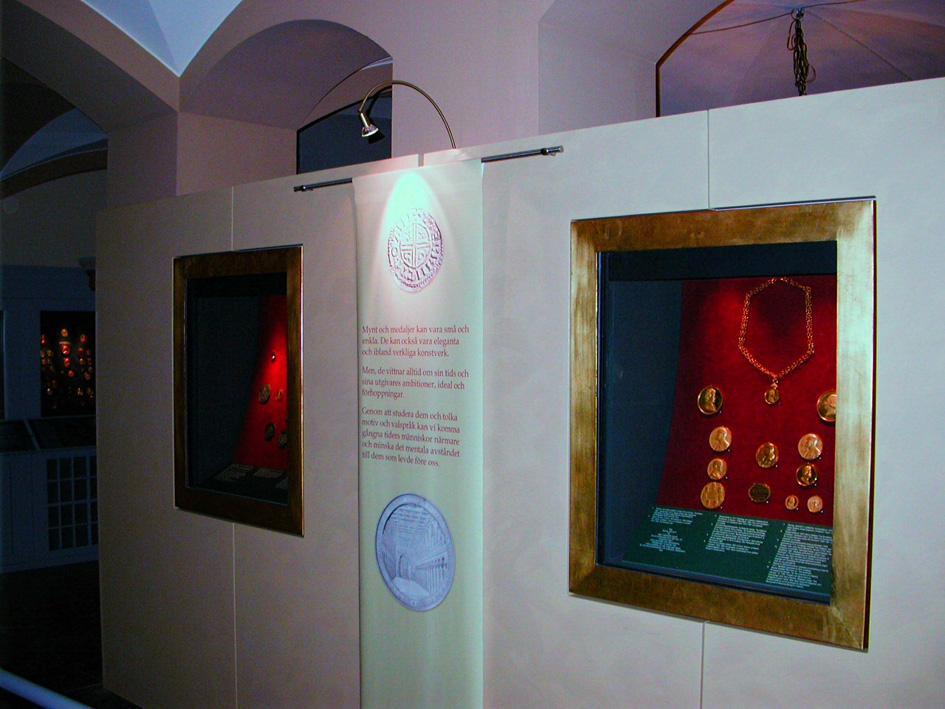
Uppsala University Coin Cabinet

The Uppsala University Coin Cabinet (Swedish: Uppsala universitets myntkabinett) is one of Sweden's most important public coin and medal collections. It is housed in the main building of Uppsala University.

== History ==
The history of the collection goes back to the 17th century. In total, it comprises close to 40,000 objects. Archives items include coin dating back to the sixth century BC to modern digital currencies. The collections of older Swedish coins and medals are especially important, together with the collections of coins from the Viking age, early modern European coins and Islamic coins. The coin cabinet is principally focused on supporting research and education at Uppsala University. Therefore, only a very representative fraction of the collections can be viewed in exhibitions. The main exhibition of coins and medals from the Middle Ages. The first numismatic thesis at Uppsala University was published in 1679. Since then, various dissertations have been written in numismatics and monetary history.

== See also ==
- History of money
- History of coins

== Other sources ==
- Elsa Lindberger (2006) Anglo-Saxon and later British Coins (Oxford University Press) ISBN 9780197263396
- Peter Berghaus, Hendrik Mäkeler (2006) Deutsche Münzen der Wikingerzeit sowie des hohen und späten Mittelalters (Uppsala: Studia Numismatica Upsaliensia) ISBN 9155466036
