= Ropewalk (Karlskrona) =

Historical rope making factory

- Repslagarbanan
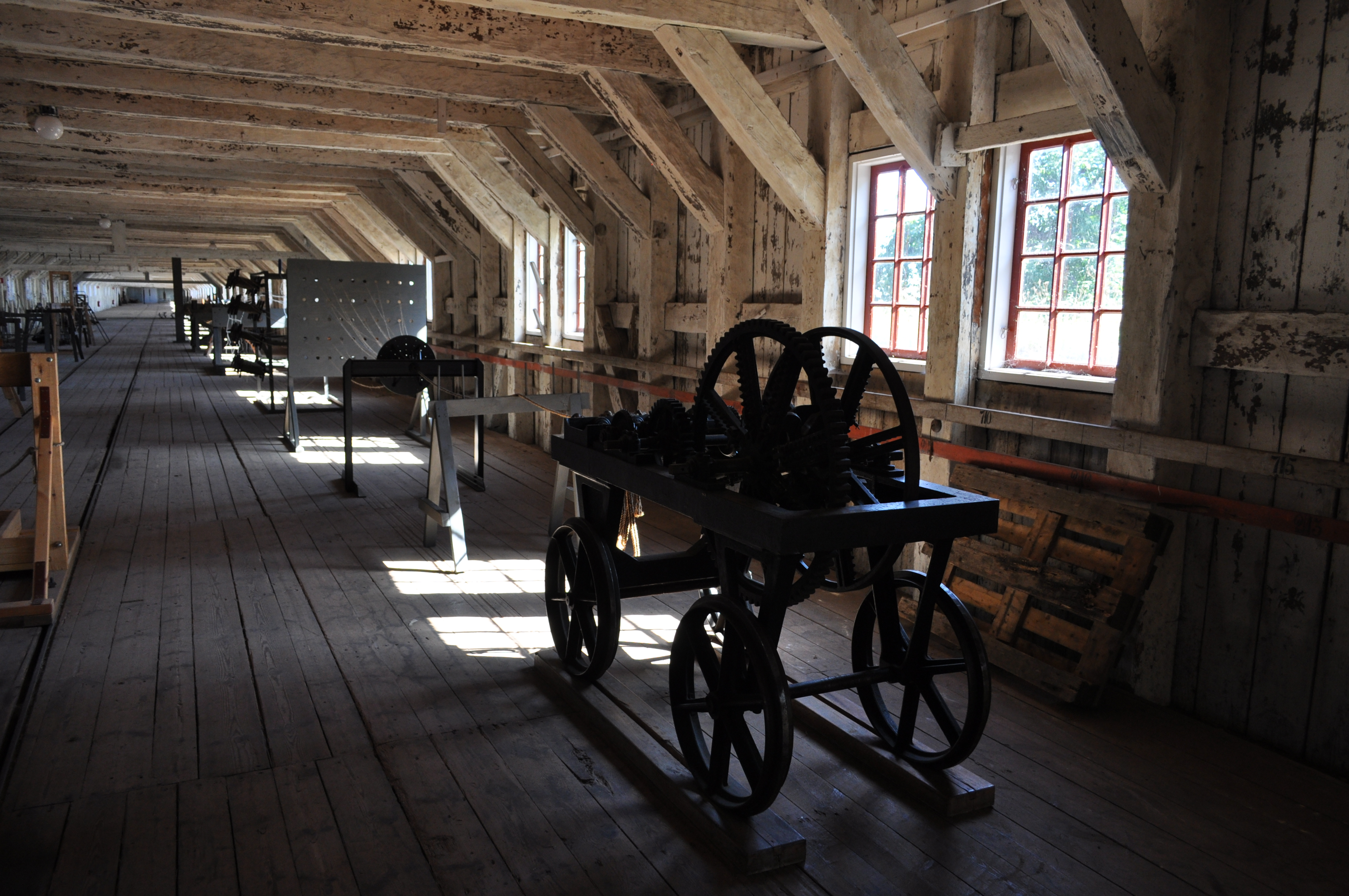
- The Ropewalk at Karlskrona

- Location within Sweden

General information
- Type: Ropewalk
- Location: Lindholmen Island, Karlskrona Naval Base, Karlskrona, Sweden
- Coordinates: 56.1513°N 15.5847°E
- Construction started: 1692
- Completed: 1693
- Renovated: 2006

Dimensions
- Diameter: (length 300 m (980 ft))

Technical details
- Structural system: Wood, brick, and granite
- Floor count: Two-story

The Ropewalk (Swedish: Repslagarbanan) is a building on the island of Lindholmen in southeastern Sweden. It is located within the naval base in Karlskrona. Dating from 1692, the rope factory terminated production in 1960 but in 2006, after renovation, it was opened to the public with exhibitions and demonstrations of ropemaking. With a length of some 300 metres (980 ft), the Ropewalk is Sweden's longest wooden building.

== History ==
Construction of the two-storey ropewalk began in November 1692 leading to the start of production the following year and reaching full capacity in 1696. As Stockholm's rope factory had burnt down in 1676, the Lindholmen factory was the country's only royal rope factory. By 1726, there were 75 employees at the works, assisted each day by up to 250 hands from the naval base. From 1793, thanks to Joseph Huddart's patented approach, it was possible to produce much stronger rope. But despite attempts by former naval officer Fredrik Henrik af Chapman to adopt the system in Karlskrona, the machine designed by one of his engineers proved a failure and it was not until 1832 that the Huddart approach was finally successful in Sweden. That same year, a steam engine was purchased to drive Lindholmen's equipment. Later in the 19th century, rails were laid for a traction engine and windows were added. In 1928, electricity was introduced allowing new machinery to be installed. New tar houses were built in brick, and ropeway walls were built on the eastern and northern sides. Between 1946 and 1957, all the machinery was replaced with a resulting increase in production enabled by the introduction of synthetic materials. Staffing was reduced until the final team consisted of just seven men. The last stretch of rope was produced on 30 December 1960. Until 1960, when production ceased, it was the only factory producing mooring ropes and cordage for the navy's warships although its products were also sold on the civilian market.

== Architecture and fittings ==
Constructed in 1692–93, the Ropewalk is one of the oldest surviving buildings in Karlskrona and the longest wooden building in Sweden. Its length of some 300 metres (980 ft) is explained by the need to manufacture long stretches of rope. Apart from the rendered brick and granite buildings housing the ropewalk machinery at either end of the two-storey structure, the facility is constructed of heavy timber with wooden panelling along the outer walls. The elaborately designed premises were also used for storing hemp and other raw materials.

== Restoration ==
The naval city of Karlskrona became a World Heritage Site in December 1998 as an exceptionally complete and well-preserved example of the naval bases of Europe which, with the navies they supported, played such an important political role over the centuries. Ropemaking was a thriving industry in Sweden at the beginning of the 20th century with some 100 ropewalks across the country. Only Westerberg in Norrköping still produces rope commercially. The Karlskrona Dockyard Society, VHFK, therefore considered it important to restore the Lindholmen ropewalk as a fully operative enterprise, functioning as it did during the first half of the 19th century. After renovations in the mid-2000s, the Ropewalk re-opened to the public as a visitor attraction. It is open from May to October. Access to the site (which is still part of the naval base) is only possible in the form of guided tours, details of which can be obtained from the Tourist Information Centre. In addition to demonstrations of the art of ropemaking, there is a rope equipment exhibition, dating from the 18th, 19th and 20th centuries.

== Gallery ==
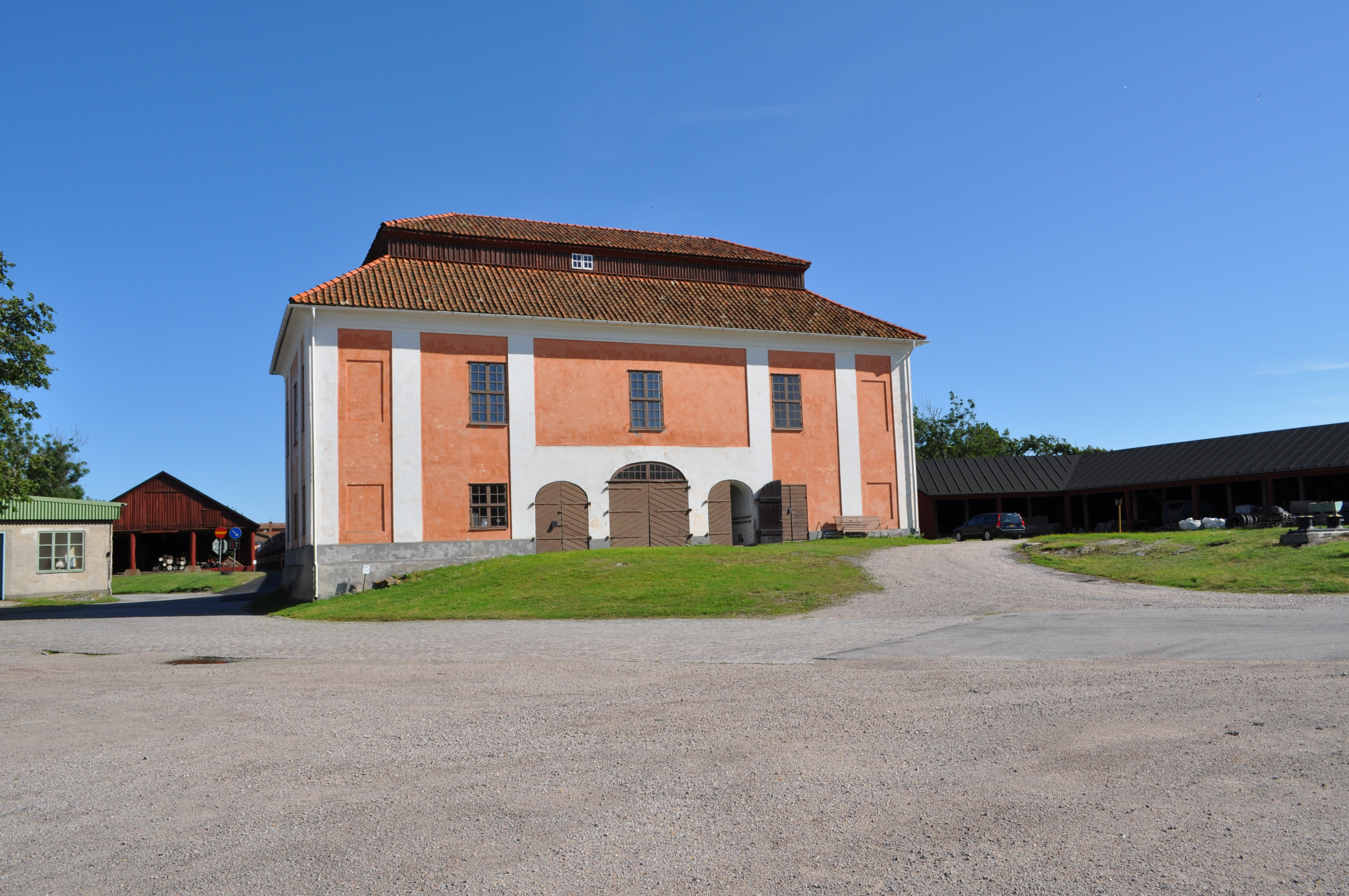
Stone buildings at either end of the wooden ropewalk

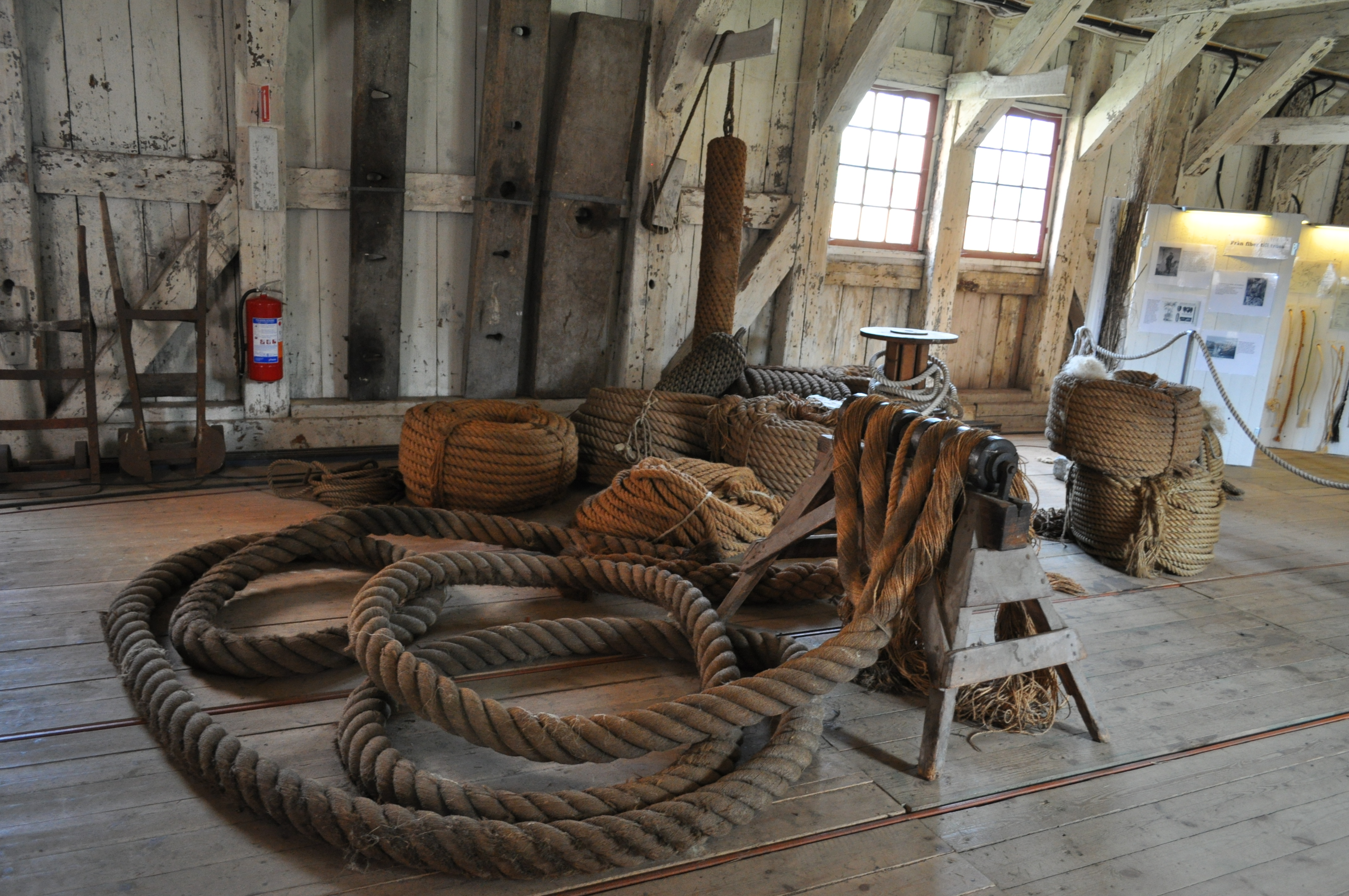
Rope samples on display

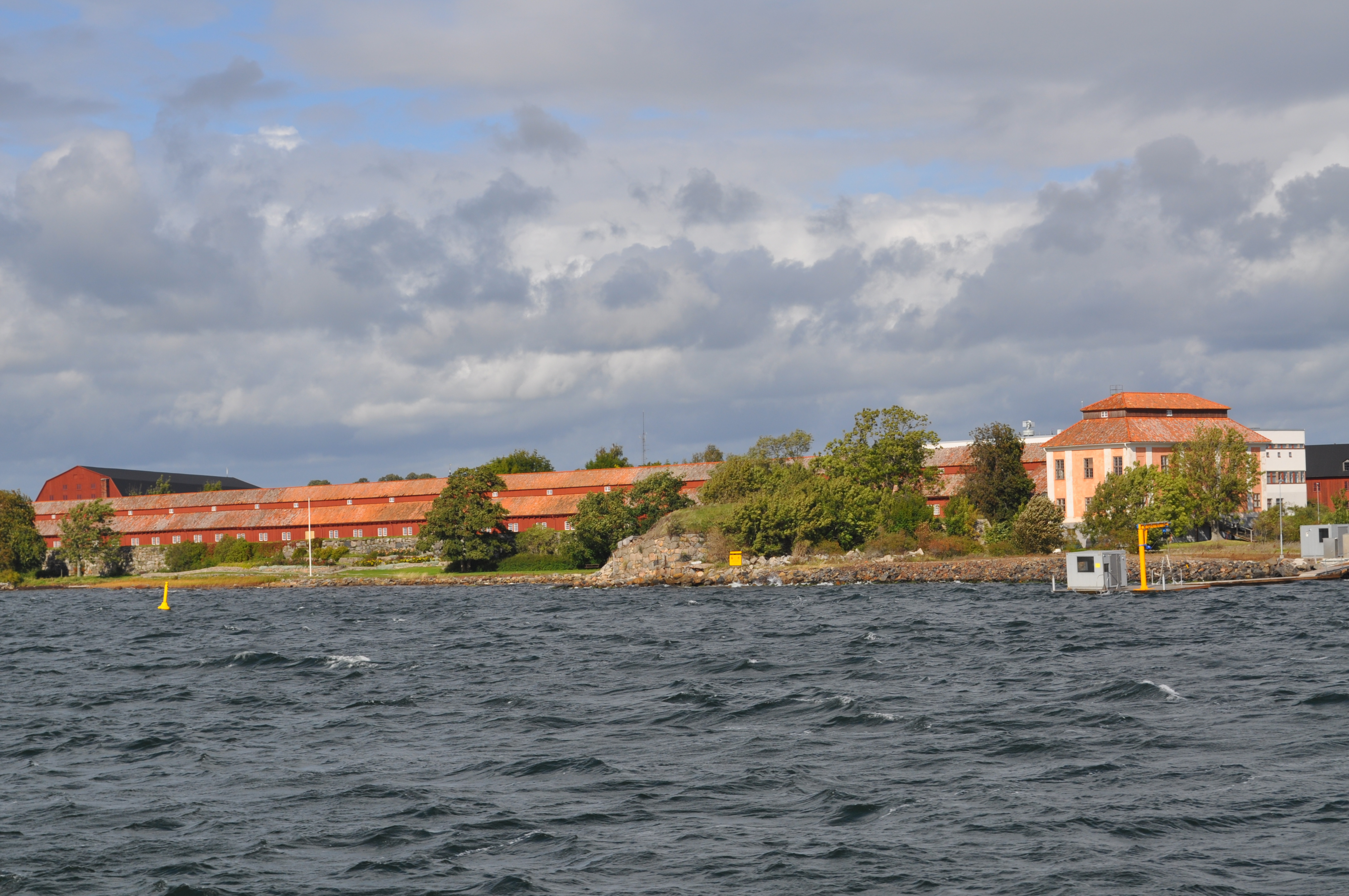
Seen from the sea to the south

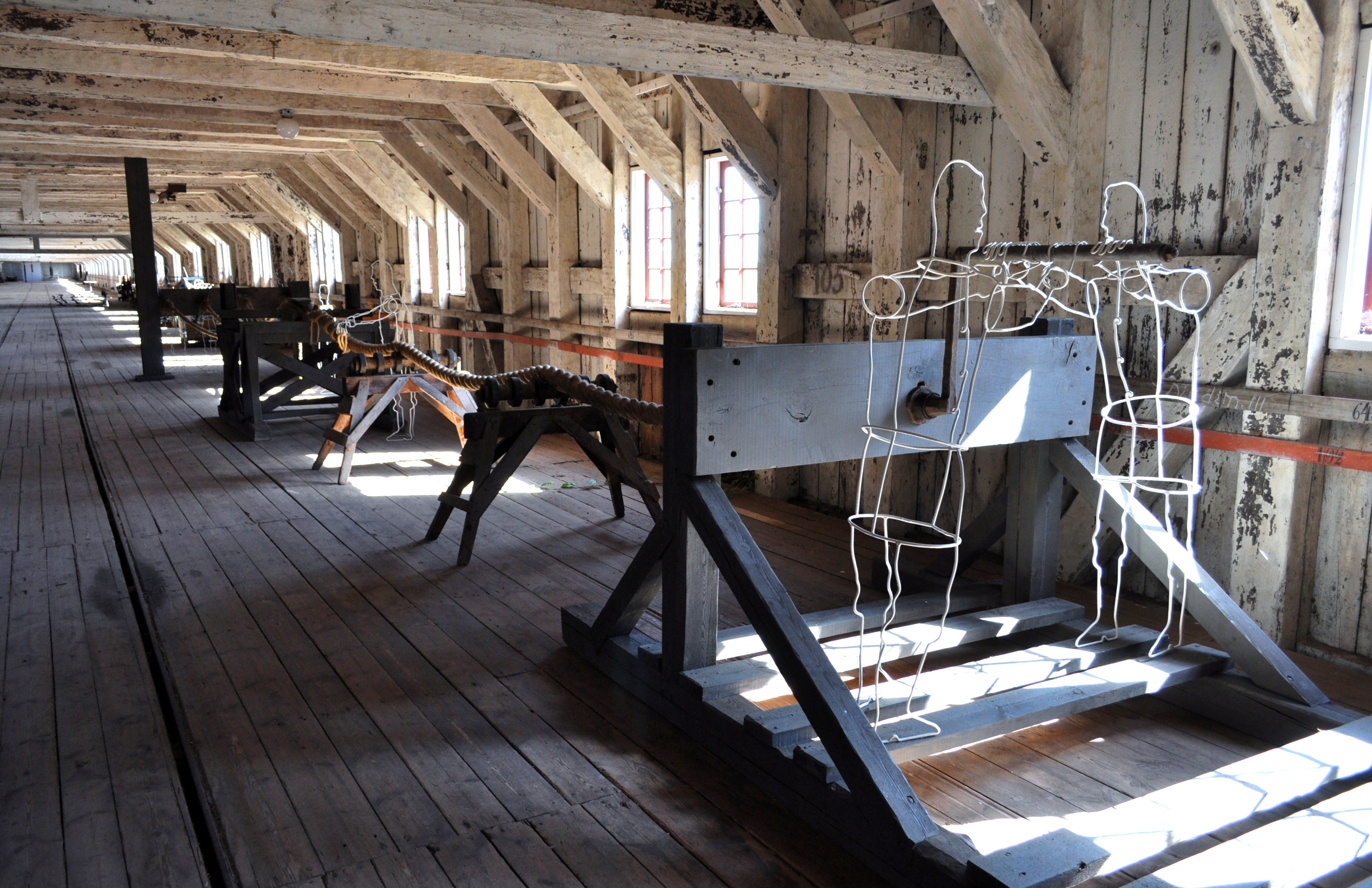
The rope-manufacturing line

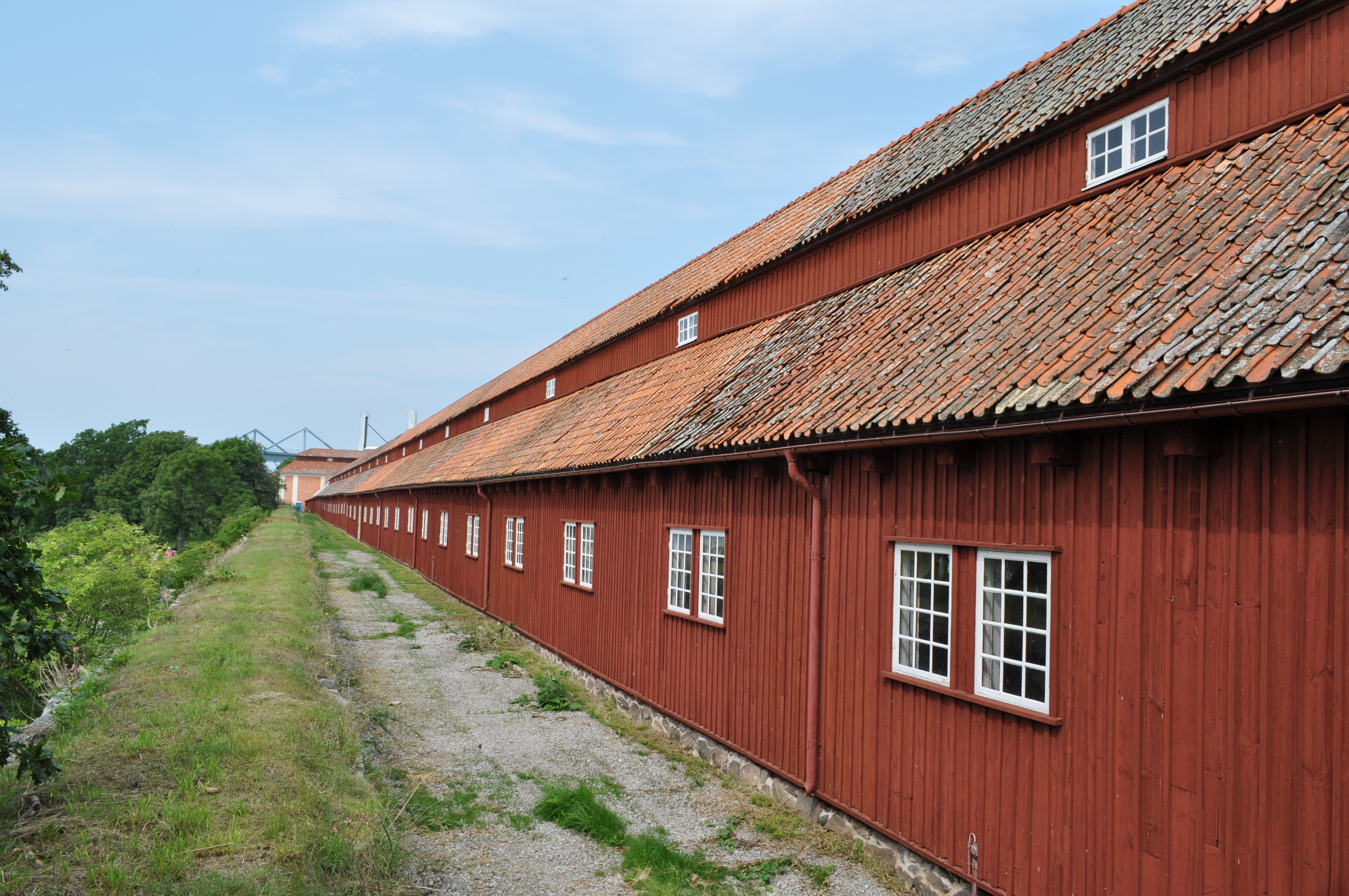
The wooden ropewalk structure, 300 metres (980 ft) in length
