= Ransäters bruksherrgård =

Coordinates: 59°45′58″N 13°26′31″E

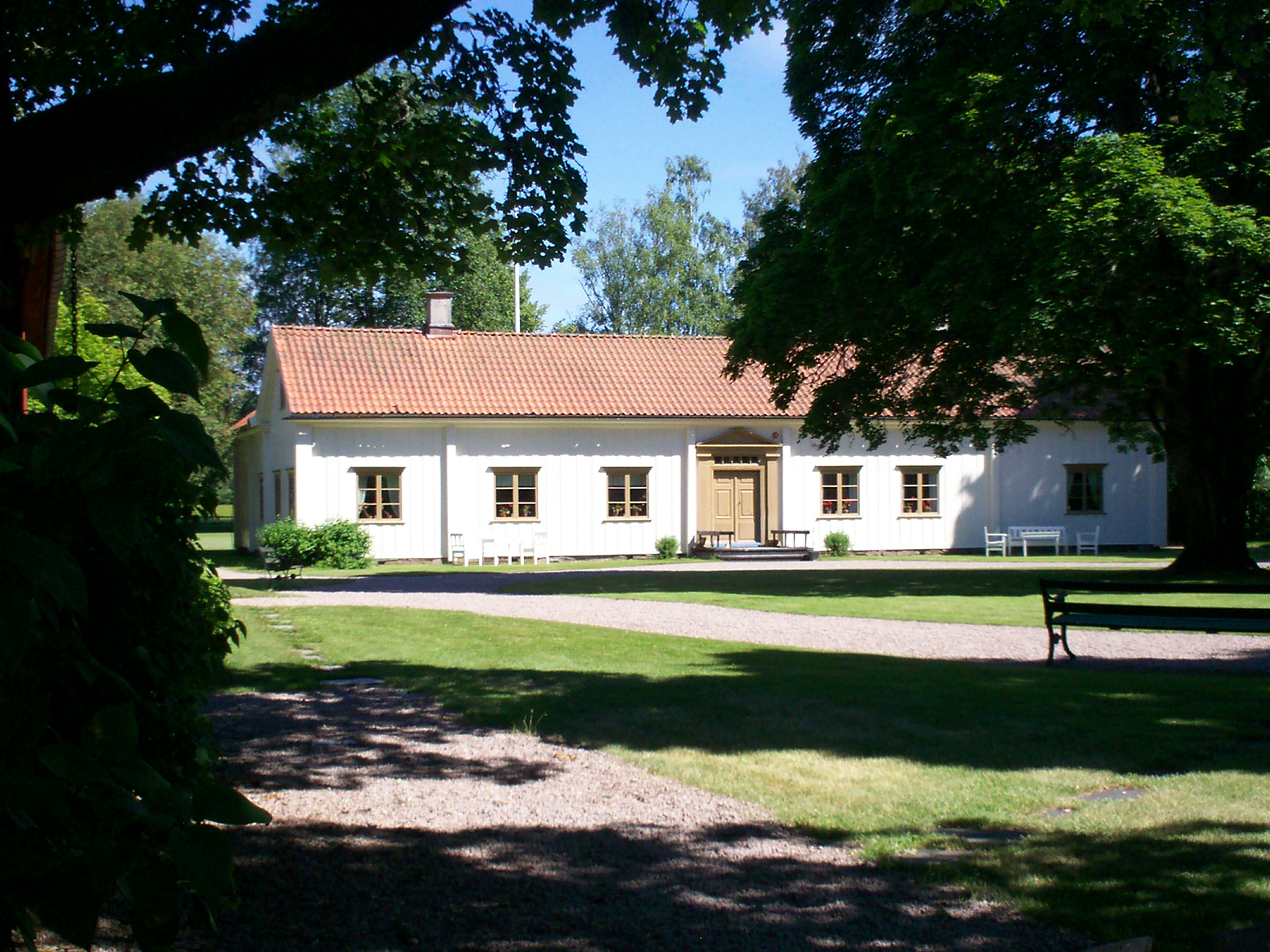
- Ransäters bruksherrgård in 2008.
- Location: Ransäter, Sweden

Ransäters bruksherrgård, also called Geijersgården i Ransäter, is located in Ransäter in Värmland, Sweden. There is a currently a museum in the main building of the former estate. It is owned and managed by the Geijerska Family Association (Geijerska släktföreningen).

== History ==
Ransäter was first an ironworks. It was built in the 17th century by mayor Johan Börjesson, who later also built Munkfors work. The ironworks had three bar iron hammers, which were closed in the end of the 19th century.

Ransäters bruksherrgård is the family estate where writer, historian, poet, philosopher, and composer Erik Gustaf Geijer (1783–1847) was born and spent his childhood. It was bought by Erik Gustaf Geijer's grandfather, and later it was sold by his younger brother Emanuel in 1817 to Barthold Dahlgren, the father of the author Fredrik August Dahlgren (1816–1895). Later, Fredrik August Dahlgren was married to a niece of Erik Gustaf Geijer.

Geijersgården was sold to Forshaga sulfit AB, but in 1907 members of the Geijer family bought it. The farm had a long, white, wooden, one-floor building. The building was demolished and in the summer of 1914 a new building was built using parts of the old building. Today, Geijersgården i Ransäter is a museum devoted to Erik Gustaf Geijer, Fredrik August Dahlgren and the painter Uno Troili (1815-1875) who was the nephew of Erik Gustaf Geijer.

Sveriges Television's Luciamorgon program aired from here in 1999.

== External libnks ==
- Nordisk familjebok (Read "Ransäter")
- Geijersgården i Ransäter Official website
