= Ekomuseum nedre Ätradalen =

Ecomuseum with several locations in Sweden

- Established: 1986
- Location: Various locations in Sweden
- Type: Ecomuseum
- Website: ekomuseum.com

Ekomuseum nedre Ätradalen ("Lower Ätran Valley Ecomuseum") is a Swedish ecomuseum founded in 1986. It consists of 80 locations in the valleys of Ätran and Suseån. Among the locations are Hagbard's Gallow, Larsagården, and Bocksten Bog. The museum is run by Intresseföreningen Ekomuseum nedre Ätradalen, with subsidies from the County Administrative Board, Falkenberg and Svenljunga Municipalities.
