= Optand Teknikland =

Museum in Östersund Municipality, Sweden

Coordinates: 63°7′35″N 14°47′55″E

Teknikland is a military history and technology museum which is located at the Östersund-Optand airfield southwest of Östersund. Teknikland has one of Sweden's largest collections of civilian and military aircraft. On the grounds howitzers, Bofors guns and armoured personnel carriers are also displayed.

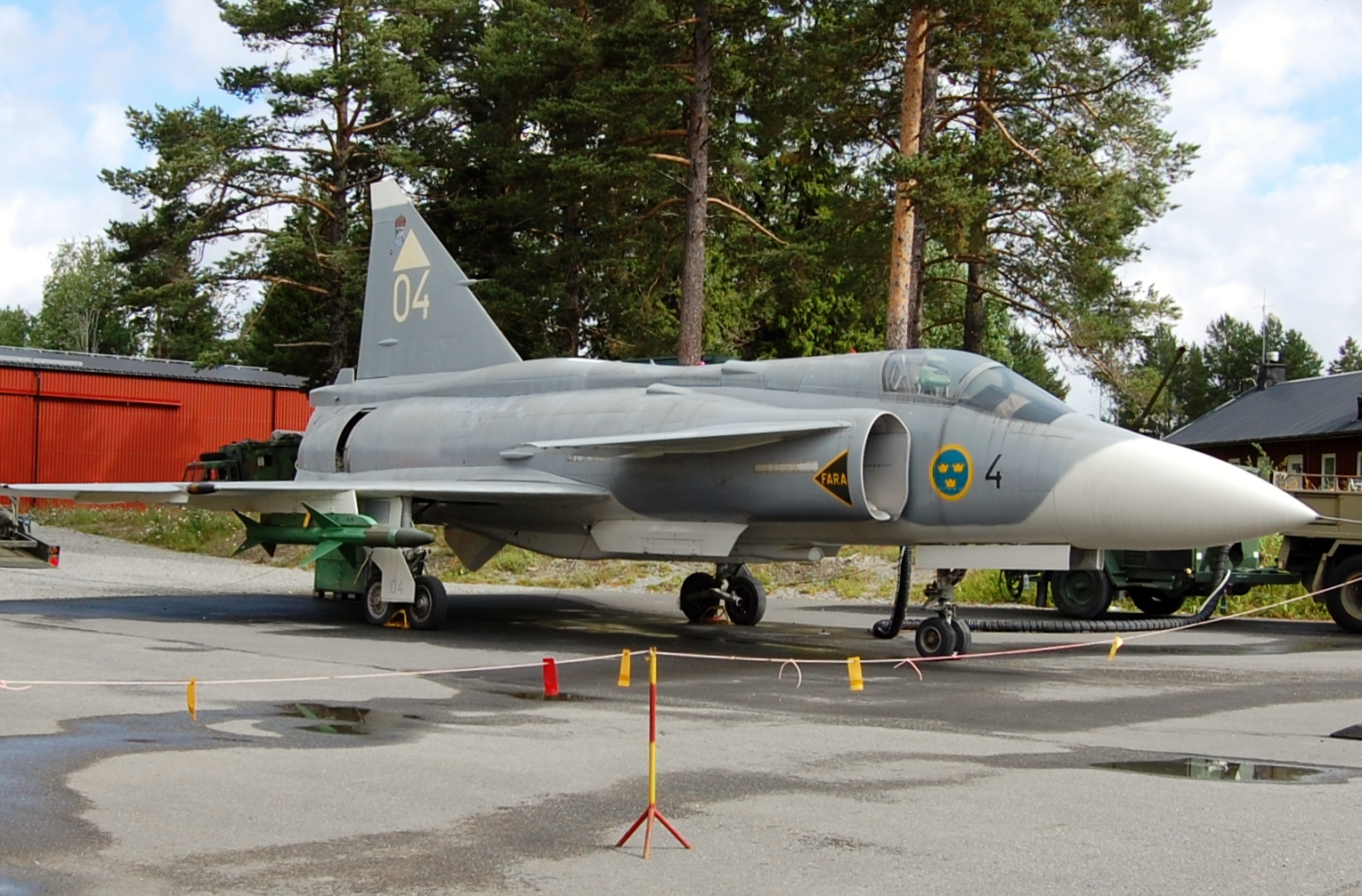
SAAB JA37 Viggen

== History ==
Teknikland was opened on 5 June 2010. The basis for the museum was the Jämtlands Flyg- och Lottamuseum which opened in 1994. The museum is run by the Aktiebolag Jämtland Teknikland AB. Shareholders are Jamtli and a number of nonprofit organizations. The museum is funded by Statens Försvarshistoriska museer, the European Regional Development Fund, and private donors.

The museum consists of three permanent and a number of temporary exhibitions. One of the permanent exhibitions is called the Garage (Garaget) and consists of antique cars and buses. This building also hosts a workshop for kids based on the educational concept KomTek. The permanent aircraft exhibition Flyg- och Lottamuseum contains all the jet-aircraft that have previously been deployed by Jämtland Wing.

There is also an exhibition dedicated to the Swedish Women's Voluntary Defence Organization which operated a canteen on the airfield during the 1930s–1940s (when the airfield was a secret military airbase in preparation for a German attack).

The third permanent exhibition is the Garrison (Garnisonen) containing weapons, uniforms and other artifacts of Swedish Army history, mostly from the former Östersund regiments I 5 and A 4. The visitor is able to learn about the Carolean Death March; a disastrous retreat by a Swedish Carolean army under the command of Lieutenant-general Carl Gustaf Armfeldt (1666–1736) across the mountain range by the Tydalen valley in Norway around the new year 1718–1719.

== See also ==
- Swedish Air Force Museum
- Västerås Flygmuseum
- List of aerospace museums
