= Lindholmen, Karlskrona =

Lindholmen
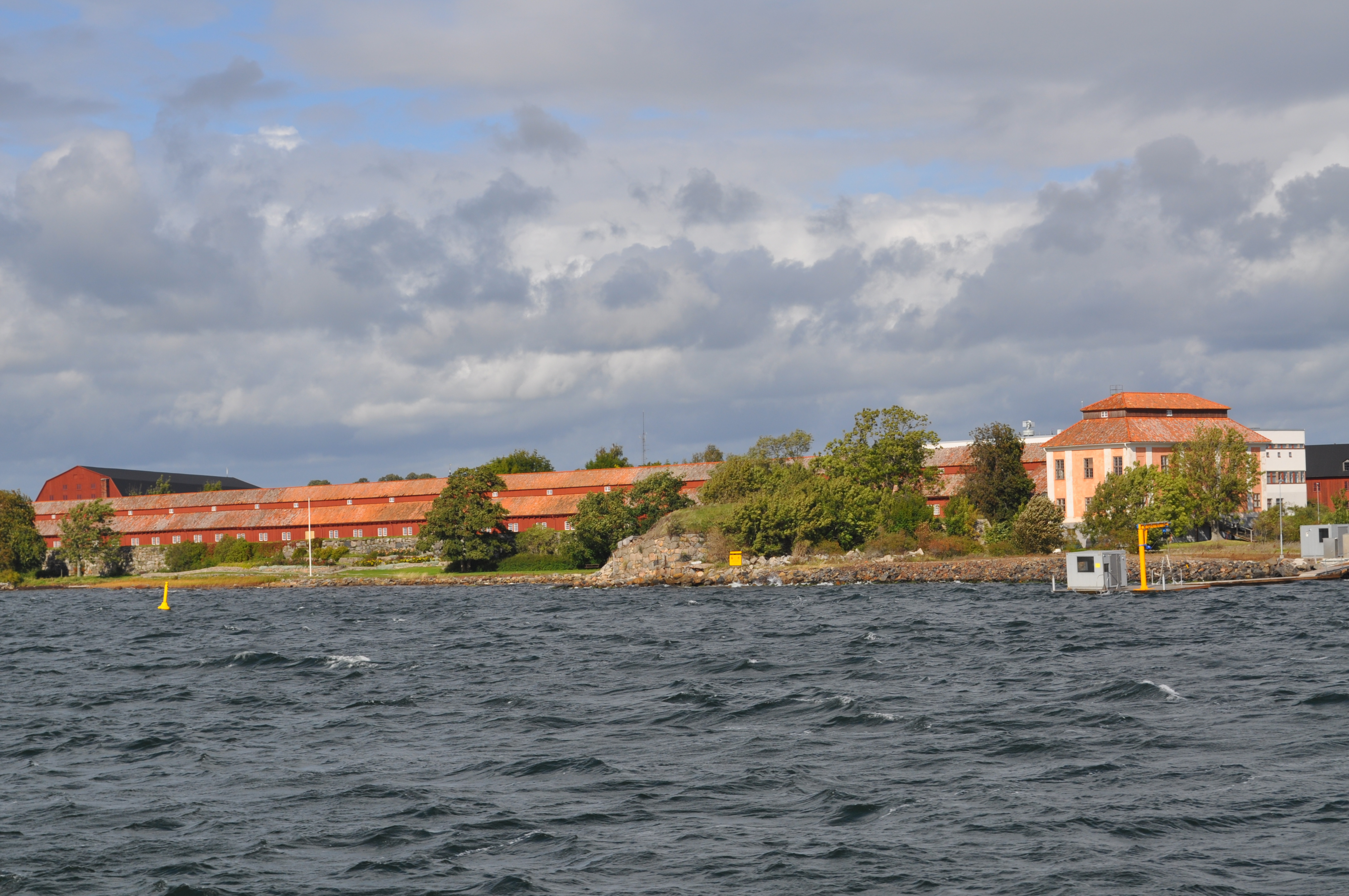
- Lindholmen from the south

- Location within Sweden
- Coordinates: 56°09′06″N 15°35′06″E
- Country: Sweden
- Province: Blekinge
- County: Blekinge County
- Municipality: Karlskrona Municipality
- Time zone: UTC+1 (CET)
  - Summer (DST): UTC+2 (CEST)

Lindholmen is a small island to the immediate south of the city of Karlskrona in the south east of Sweden. Since the end of the 17th century, it has formed part of the Karlskrona Naval Base. It contains a number of facilities for the base including the Polhem Dock (Pohlhemsdockan) and the Ropewalk (Repslagarebanan).
